= February 1983 North American blizzard =

North American blizzard in 1983

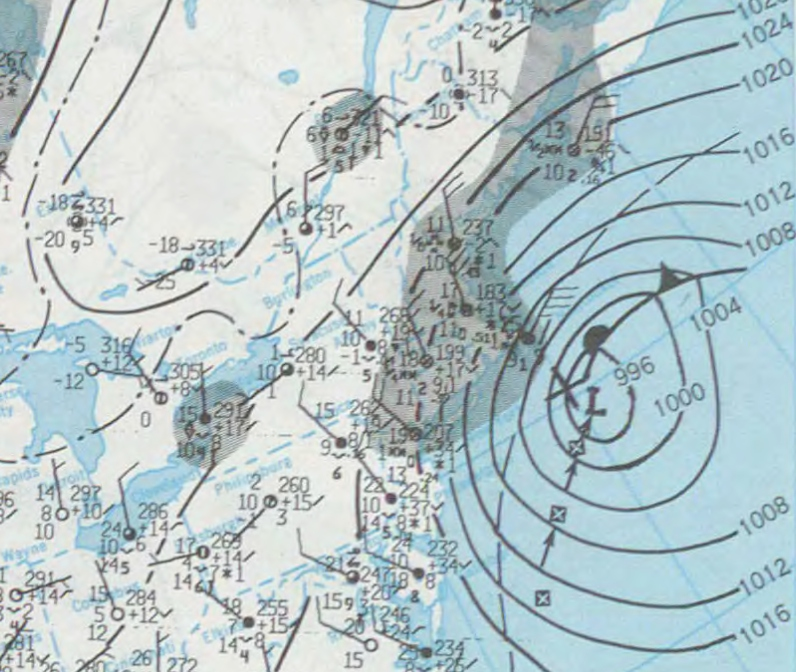
- The low-pressure area causing blizzard conditions across portions of the Northeast on February 12

Meteorological history
- Formed: February 9, 1983
- Exited land: February 12, 1983
- Dissipated: February 15, 1983

Category 4 "Crippling" blizzard
- Regional snowfall index: 14.78 (NOAA)
- Lowest pressure: <1002 mbar (hPa); <29.59 inHg
- Max. snowfall: 35 in (89 cm) in Glengary, West Virginia

Tornado outbreak
- Tornadoes: 12
- Max. rating: F3 tornado
- Duration: February 9–10, 1983
- Highest winds: 76 mph (122 km/h) (highest convective wind)
- Largest hail: 3 in (7.6 cm)

Overall effects
- Fatalities: 46
- Injuries: 10
- Areas affected: Mid-Atlantic, Northeastern United States, and New England
- Part of the 1982–83 North American winter and tornadoes and tornado outbreaks of 1983

A blizzard in February 1983, nicknamed the "Megalopolitan Blizzard", impacted the Mid-Atlantic, Northeast, and New England regions of the United States. First developing as a low-pressure area on February 9 while a El Niño event ensued, the low then moved eastward across the Gulf of Mexico. While the low progressed across the Gulf, several tornadoes associated with the system touched down across Texas, Louisiana, and Florida, ultimately resulting in ten injuries. The low then emerged over the Atlantic Ocean near the Georgia–South Carolina border, later developing and intensifying into a cyclone as it moved parallel along the East Coast of the United States. The cyclone then moved northward while producing blizzard conditions and heavy snowfall across portions of the Mid-Atlantic on February 11, including across Maryland and northern Virginia. Continuing to intensify and moving northward, the cyclone then brought heavy snow and blizzard conditions to parts of the Northeast and New England. Overall, the blizzard caused 46 deaths and set multiple weather records in terms of snowfall.

== Meteorological synopsis ==
In 1982 and 1983, a strong El Niño occurred, including on the dates during the blizzard's occurrence, which led to above-average temperatures across the northern United States and a cooler and wetter weather pattern across the South. On February 9, a low-pressure area formed, centered over eastern Texas and along the Texas-Gulf of Mexico coastline. It then progressed eastward across the Gulf the next day before moving across the Southeastern United States and emerging in the Atlantic Ocean off the Georgia-Florida coast. The low-pressure system then intensified and fully developed into a cyclone as it approached Cape Hatteras, North Carolina. As the cyclone moved northward along the East Coast of the United States, snow fell across the Mid-Atlantic beginning on February 11, with some areas experiencing blizzard conditions. The cyclone then produced snow and blizzard conditions across portions of the Northeastern United States and New England regions, continuing to intensify as its pressure dropped to 1003 millibars by February 12. The low's pressure continued to drop on that day while reaching portions of southern New England before tracking offshore northward off the New England coast. The blizzard was nicknamed the "Megalopolitan Blizzard" after the system hit numerous metropolitan areas along the East Coast of the United States with 30–75 centimeters (12–30 in) of snow.

== Preparations and impact ==
=== Mid-Atlantic ===
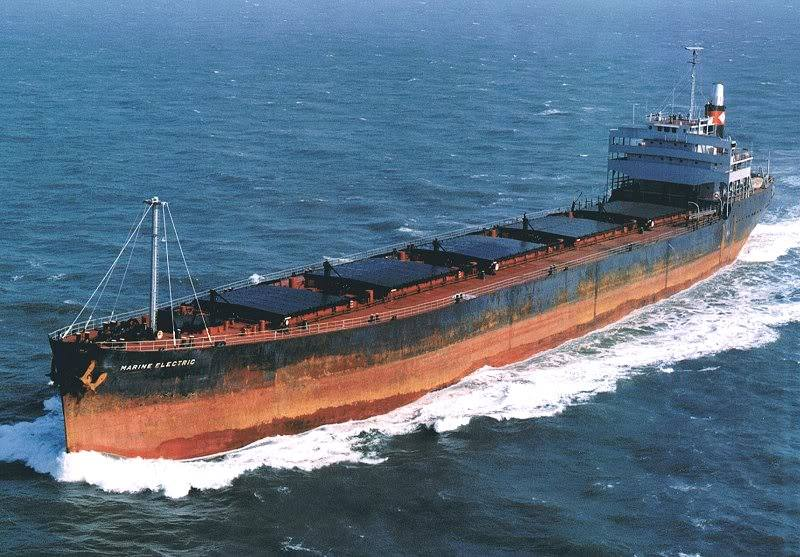
The SS Marine Electric pictured before its sinking. The cyclone caused the merchant ship to capsize on February 12, causing at least 31 deaths.

In preparation of the blizzard in Virginia, Eastern Mennonite University and James Madison University were closed, with the latter cancelling its classes for the first time since the Ash Wednesday Storm of 1962. At Richmond International Airport in Richmond, 17.7 inches (45 cm) of snow fell, which was the third-highest snow accumulation in the city on record. Daily snowfall records were set in Lynchburg and Roanoke, where 14.6 inches (37 cm) and 18.4 inches (47 cm) of snow fell in 24 hours, respectively. The heaviest snow fell in Woodstock, where 32 inches (81 cm) of snow accumulated. The cyclone caused the SS Marine Electric, a merchant ship, to capsize, killing 31 of the 34 onboard and prompting an investigation into the incident and the ship's design itself by the United States Coast Guard's board of inquiry. As a result of the sinking, the Coast Guard's inspection procedures were modified and new additions and requirements were introduced to the maritime law enforcement's marine safety guideline.

In Maryland, 22.8 inches (58 cm) of snow fell in Baltimore, which was the second-highest snowfall after the Knickerbocker storm in 1922. Some areas in Frederick and Montgomery counties in Maryland had their heaviest snowfall on record. In Washington, D.C., 16.4 inches (42 cm) of snow fell, closing Baltimore/Washington International Airport, Dulles International Airport, and Washington National Airport (renamed Ronald Reagan Washington National Airport in 1998) and shutting down the Washington Metro. Numerous vehicle accidents occurred in West Virginia, as there were more than 34,000 homes without power across Charleston and Pineville. Among the highest snow accumulations from the blizzard occurred in Glengary, West Virginia, where 35 inches (89 cm) of snow accumulated. In Windsor Locks, Connecticut, a record 19 inches (48 cm) of snow fell in 12 hours.

=== Northeastern United States ===
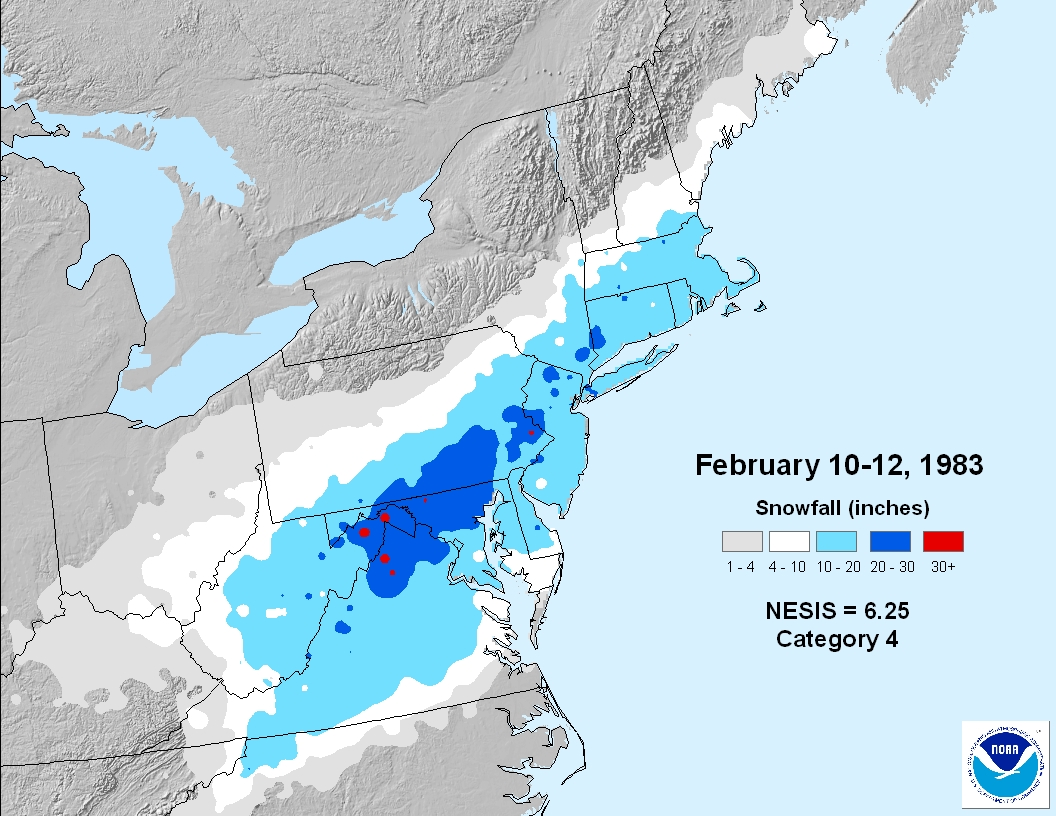
Snowfall totals across the Mid-Atlantic and Northeastern United States from the blizzard

In Lancaster, Pennsylvania, the snow prompted firefighters and emergency management to sleep in the fire department's halls to prepare for emergencies. On February 11, the heavy snowfall also cancelled Ronald and Nancy Reagan's trip to Camp David, causing Secretary of State George Shultz to be invited for dinner and marking the beginning of the shift towards ending the Cold War. The blizzard also produced 21 inches (53 cm) in Springfield, Massachusetts, the third-highest snowfall total there since 1905 as of 2013, and resulted in thousands of people being stranded at an Aerosmith concert. The concert itself was delayed by more than an hour after the band's lead singer, Steven Tyler, arrived late because of the blizzard. The blizzard produced the same snowfall total in Springfield, Massachusetts, as at Bradley International Airport in Hartford, Connecticut, which is recorded as the fourth-highest snowfall total there as of 2015. Hundreds of vehicles were abandoned on the Staten Island Expressway as heavy snowfall rates occurred and up to 22 inches (56 cm) of snow fell. In Central Park, 17.6 inches (45 cm) of snow fell, which is the thirteenth-highest snowfall accumulation there since 1869 as of 2021. Twenty-four-hour snowfall records were set in Allentown, Harrisburg, and Philadelphia, with all three cities receiving more than 20 inches (51 cm) of snow. In Allentown and Bethlehem, 5 inches (13 cm) of snow fell in one hour. At Harrisburg International Airport, 25 inches (64 cm) of snow fell, which is the second-highest snow accumulation across the Susquehanna Valley. Lightning also occurred during the blizzard in some areas across the Northeast.

Several airports were closed as a result of near-zero visibility caused by the heavy snowfall, including LaGuardia Airport, Newark Liberty International Airport, and John F. Kennedy International Airport across the New York metropolitan area, as well as Philadelphia International Airport in Philadelphia. Multiple departing flights from Wilkes-Barre/Scranton International Airport were cancelled, and the Pennsylvania State Police noted that Interstate 80 "closed itself". Businesses and schools across Pennsylvania were closed, and Interstate 95 in Philadelphia was closed. A snow emergency was declared in New York City, as well as a state of emergency for several areas in New Jersey, including Trenton.

== Tornado outbreak ==
Confirmed tornadoes by Fujita rating
FU	F0	F1	F2	F3	F4	F5	Total
0	3	5	3	1	0	0	12

Color/symbol key
Color / symbol	Description
†	Data from Grazulis 1990/1993/2001b
¶	Data from a local National Weather Service office
※	Data from the 1983 Storm Data publication
‡	Data from the NCEI database
♯	Maximum width of tornado
±	Tornado was rated below F2 intensity by Grazulis but a specific rating is unavailable.

Prior to 1990, there is a likely undercount of tornadoes, particularly E/F0–1, with reports of weaker tornadoes becoming more common as population increased. A sharp increase in the annual average E/F0–1 count by approximately 200 tornadoes was noted upon the implementation of NEXRAD Doppler weather radar in 1990–1991. (Note: Historically, the number of tornadoes globally and in the United States was and is likely underrepresented: research by Grazulis on annual tornado activity suggests that, as of 2001, only 53% of yearly U.S. tornadoes were officially recorded. Documentation of tornadoes outside the United States was historically less exhaustive, owing to the lack of monitors in many nations and, in some cases, to internal political controls on public information. Most countries only recorded tornadoes that produced severe damage or loss of life. Significant low biases in U.S. tornado counts likely occurred through the early 1990s, when advanced NEXRAD was first installed and the National Weather Service began comprehensively verifying tornado occurrences.) 1974 marked the first year where significant tornado (E/F2+) counts became homogenous with contemporary values, attributed to the consistent implementation of Fujita scale assessments. (Note: The Fujita scale was devised under the aegis of scientist T. Theodore Fujita in the early 1970s. Prior to the advent of the scale in 1971, tornadoes in the United States were officially unrated. Tornado ratings were retroactively applied to events prior to the formal adoption of the F-scale by the National Weather Service. While the Fujita scale has been superseded by the Enhanced Fujita scale in the U.S. since February 1, 2007, Canada used the old scale until April 1, 2013; nations elsewhere, like the United Kingdom, apply other classifications such as the TORRO scale.) Numerous discrepancies on the details of tornadoes in this outbreak exist between sources. The total count of tornadoes and ratings differs from various agencies accordingly. The list below documents information from the most contemporary official sources alongside assessments from tornado historian Thomas P. Grazulis.

=== February 9 event ===
List of confirmed tornadoes — Wednesday, February 9, 1983 (Note: All dates are based on the local time zone where the tornado touched down; however, all times are in Coordinated Universal Time for consistency.)
F#	Location	County / Parish	State	Start Coord. (Note: All starting coordinates are based on the NCEI database and may not reflect contemporary analyses)	Time (UTC)	Path length	Width (Note: The listed width values are primarily the average/mean width of the tornadoes, with those having known maximum widths denoted by ♯. From 1952 to 1994, reports largely list mean width whereas contemporary years list maximum width. Values provided by Grazulis are the average width, with estimates being rounded down (i.e. 0.5 mi (0.80 km) is rounded down from 880 yards to 800 yards.)	Damage (Note: The National Oceanic and Atmospheric Administration's Storm Data publication does not list exact damage totals for every event, instead giving damage categories. As such, damage for individual tornadoes is not comprehensive.)
F1	New Waverly	Walker	TX	30.53°N 95.50°W	18:30–?	2 mi (3.2 km)	40 yd (37 m)	$250,000
F1	A hay-filled barn was uplifted, bits of which were thrown 200 yd (180 m).							
F2±	Southwestern Houston	Harris	TX	29.65°N 95.45°W	19:30–?	1.5 mi (2.4 km)	50 yd (46 m)	$250,000
F2±	A carport was damaged, along with four warehouses, three of which were unroofed. Three injuries were reported.							
F1	Pasadena※	Harris	TX	29.70°N 95.03°W	19:50–?	1 mi (1.6 km)	20 yd (18 m)	$250,000
F1	A few trailers, fences, roofs, traffic lights, and a utility pole were damaged.							
F1	Northern Houston※	Harris	TX	29.70°N 95.27°W	20:10–?	1 mi (1.6 km)	20 yd (18 m)	$25,000
F1	This tornado flattened a carport and damaged a garage.							
F0	Western Huntsville	Walker	TX	30.72°N 95.62°W	20:15–?	0.5 mi (0.80 km)	20 yd (18 m)	Unknown
F0	A tornado developed over agricultural land, doing no known structural damage.							
F1	Coldspring	San Jacinto	TX	30.60°N 95.12°W	20:20–?	0.5 mi (0.80 km)	30 yd (27 m)	$250,000
F1	This tornado caused fallen utility poles and trees to land on a house. Billboards were shredded as well, and the tornado also traversed Texas State Highway 156.							
F2±	N of Manvel to near Pearland※	Brazoria	TX	29.48°N 95.35°W	20:25–?	8 mi (13 km)	50 yd (46 m)	$25,000
F2±	Trees and a few carports were torn apart.							
F2†	SE of Eunice	Acadia	LA	30.43°N 92.33°W	23:30–?	3 mi (4.8 km)	150 yd (140 m)	$250,000
F2†	This tornado affected the Richard–Hundley area, almost leveling a small home.							
F3	E of Church Point to NNE of Courtableau	Acadia, St. Landry	LA	30.40°N 92.18°W	23:45–?	21 mi (34 km)	150 yd (140 m)	$2,500,000※
F3	This was a multiple-vortex tornado. A church, a grain elevator, and at least seven homes were demolished. Seven people were injured.							

=== February 10 event ===
List of confirmed tornadoes — Thursday, February 10, 1983
F#	Location	County / Parish	State	Start Coord.	Time (UTC)	Path length	Width	Damage
F0	Southwestern Miami	Dade	FL	25.65°N 80.43°W	21:45–?	0.5 mi (0.80 km)	20 yd (18 m)	$30
F0	This tornado caused window damage, felled trees, and downed power lines.							
F0	Western Hollywood※	Broward	FL	26.13°N 80.13°W	22:00–?	0.5 mi (0.80 km)	20 yd (18 m)	$25,000
F0	Coincident with golf ball-sized hail, this tornado damaged roofing and trees.							
F1	West Palm Beach※	Palm Beach	FL	26.68°N 80.13°W	22:42–?	2 mi (3.2 km)	40 yd (37 m)	$2,500
F1	Power lines, fencing, and screened pool enclosures were knocked down. Trees were felled as well.							

== Sources ==
- Agee, Ernest M.; Childs, Samuel (June 1, 2014). "Adjustments in Tornado Counts, F-Scale Intensity, and Path Width for Assessing Significant Tornado Destruction". Journal of Applied Meteorology and Climatology. 53 (6). American Meteorological Society: 1494–1505. Bibcode:2014JApMC..53.1494A. doi:10.1175/JAMC-D-13-0235.1.
- Brooks, Harold E. (April 2004). "On the Relationship of Tornado Path Length and Width to Intensity". Weather and Forecasting. 19 (2): 310–19. Bibcode:2004WtFor..19..310B. doi:10.1175/1520-0434(2004)019<0310:OTROTP>2.0.CO;2.
- Cook, A. R.; Schaefer, J. T. (August 2008). "The Relation of El Niño–Southern Oscillation (ENSO) to Winter Tornado Outbreaks". Monthly Weather Review. 136 (8): 3121–3137. Bibcode:2008MWRv..136.3121C. doi:10.1175/2007MWR2171.1.
- Edwards, Roger; LaDue, James G.; Ferree, John T.; Scharfenberg, Kevin; Maier, Chris; Coulbourne, William L. (May 1, 2013). "Tornado Intensity Estimation: Past, Present, and Future". Bulletin of the American Meteorological Society. 94 (5). American Meteorological Society: 641–653. Bibcode:2013BAMS...94..641E. doi:10.1175/BAMS-D-11-00006.1.
- Grazulis, Thomas P. (May 1984). Violent Tornado Climatography, 1880–1982. OSTI (Technical report). NUREG. Washington, D.C.: Nuclear Regulatory Commission. OSTI 7099491. CR-3670.
  - — (November 1990). Significant Tornadoes 1880–1989. Vol. 2. St. Johnsbury, Vermont: The Tornado Project of Environmental Films. ISBN 1-879362-02-3.
  - — (July 1993). Significant Tornadoes 1680–1991: A Chronology and Analysis of Events. St. Johnsbury, Vermont: The Tornado Project of Environmental Films. ISBN 1-879362-03-1.
  - — (2001a). The Tornado: Nature's Ultimate Windstorm. Norman: University of Oklahoma Press. ISBN 978-0-8061-3538-0.
  - — (2001b). F5-F6 Tornadoes. St. Johnsbury, Vermont: The Tornado Project of Environmental Films.
- National Weather Service (February 1983). Storm Data Publication (Report). National Centers for Environmental Information – via Storm Events Database.
- National Weather Service (February 1983). "Storm Data and Unusual Weather Phenomena". Storm Data. 25 (2). Asheville, North Carolina: National Climatic Data Center.
