= Texas State Highway 150 =

State highway in Texas

State Highway 150
- SH 150 highlighted in red

Route information
- Maintained by TxDOT
- Length: 35.937 mi (Note: The certified mileage given is shorter than the actual mileage as TxDOT considers SH 150 to be discontinuous at rather than concurrent with SH 75.) (57.835 km)
- Existed: 1930–present

Major junctions
- West end: I-45 / FM 1374 near New Waverly
- East end: Future I-69 / US 59 in Shepherd

Location
- Country: United States
- State: Texas

Highway system
- Highways in Texas; Interstate; US; State; Former; Toll; Loops; Spurs; FM/RM; Park; Rec
← SH 149	→ SH 151

State Highway 150 (SH 150) is an east–west highway in southeastern Texas beginning in New Waverly, starting at Interstate 45 and proceeds east going through Coldspring, where it turns southeast to Shepherd and terminates at Future Interstate 69/US 59.

== Route description ==
SH 150 begins at an intersection with Interstate 45/FM 1374 just outside the city limits of New Waverly. The highway then enters New Waverly and intersects SH 75, with the two highways sharing a brief overlap, with SH 150 leaving SH 75 and turning east onto Gibbs Street near the town square, running concurrent with FM 1375 from SH 75 to Elmore Street. The highway leaves New Waverly near the intersection with Rogers Road. SH 150 travels through wooded areas and farmland of the Sam Houston National Forest and serves the unincorporated town of Old Waverly before reaching Coldspring near the southwestern shore of Lake Livingston.

The highway enters Coldspring at an intersection with FM 2025, where SH 150 also turns to the northeast, then turns east at SH 156 before turning south-southeast at FM 1514 in the town square. Leaving Coldspring, SH 150 turns in a more southeastern direction and continues to run through the Sam Houston National Forest. The highway turns back into a more eastern direction at FM 2666 then enters the town of Shepherd. In Shepherd, SH 150 is known locally as Main Street and intersects FM 222 and Loop 424 before ending at the southbound frontage road for US 59 (future Interstate 69).

== History ==
SH 150 was designated on March 19, 1930 from US 75 (now SH 75) near New Waverly to Shepherd, replacing SH 45A and part of a branch of SH 45. On October 26, 1962, SH 150 was extended from US 75 to I-45.

== Major intersections ==
County	Location	mi	km	Destinations	Notes
Walker		0.0	0.0	I-45 / FM 1374 west	Western terminus; I-45 exit 102
Walker	New Waverly	1.2	1.9	SH 75 north	West end of SH 75 overlap
Walker	New Waverly	1.4	2.3	SH 75 south / FM 1375 west	East end of SH 75 overlap; west end of FM 1375 overlap
Walker	New Waverly	1.5	2.4	FM 1375 east	East end of FM 1375 overlap
Walker		6.2	10.0	FM 2693 east	
Walker		8.1	13.0	FM 1097 west – Willis	
San Jacinto		10.4	16.7	FM 1725 south	
San Jacinto	Punkin	14.2	22.9	FM 2693 west	
San Jacinto	Evergreen	16.9	27.2	FM 945 north	West end of FM 945 overlap
San Jacinto	Evergreen	17.0	27.4	FM 945 south – Cleveland	East end of FM 945 overlap
San Jacinto		22.7	36.5	FM 2025 south – Cleveland, Double Lake Recreation Area	
San Jacinto	Coldspring	24.3	39.1	SH 156 north – Point Blank	
San Jacinto	Coldspring	24.6	39.6	FM 1514 north (Byrd Avenue)	
San Jacinto		26.6	42.8	FM 222 north – Lake Livingston Dam, Camilla, Livingston	
San Jacinto		34.0	54.7	FM 2666 west	
San Jacinto	Shepherd	35.4	57.0	FM 222 north – Lake Livingston Dam, Camilla, Livingston	
San Jacinto	Shepherd	35.7	57.5	Loop 424 to US 59 north – Livingston, Cleveland	
San Jacinto	Shepherd	36.1	58.1	Future I-69 south / US 59 south – Cleveland	Eastern terminus at south frontage road; US 59 exit 451; US 59 is the future Interstate 69
1.000 mi = 1.609 km; 1.000 km = 0.621 mi: Concurrency terminus
