= Hurricane Rita =

Category 5 Atlantic hurricane in 2005

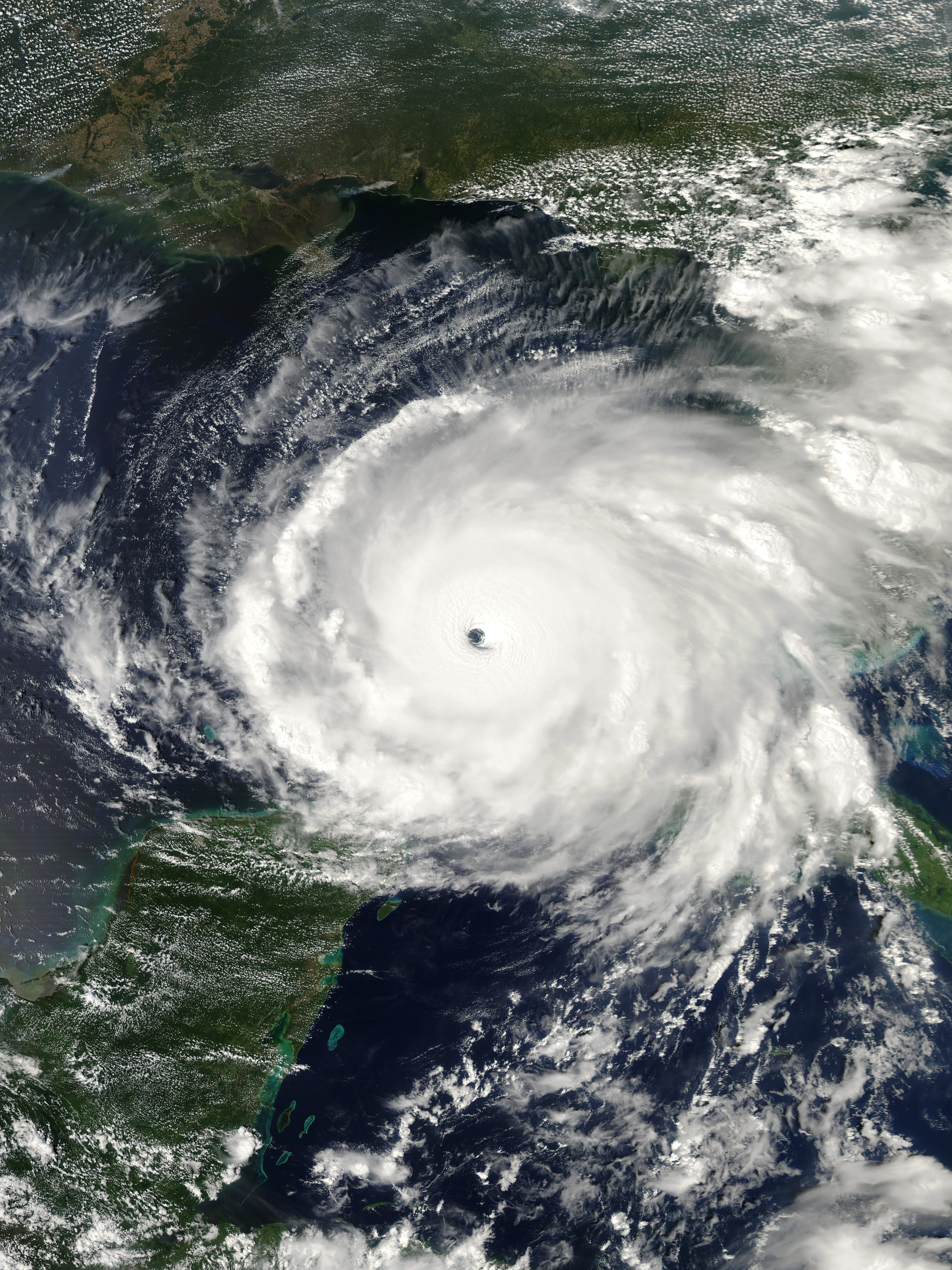
- Hurricane Rita near its peak intensity on September 21

Meteorological history
- Formed: September 18, 2005
- Dissipated: September 26, 2005

Category 5 major hurricane
- 1-minute sustained (SSHWS/NWS)
- Highest winds: 180 mph (285 km/h)
- Lowest pressure: 895 mbar (hPa); 26.43 inHg (Tied for lowest recorded in the Gulf of Mexico)

Overall effects
- Fatalities: 120 (7 direct)
- Damage: $18.5 billion (2005 USD)
- Areas affected: Hispaniola, Lucayan Archipelago, Cuba, Southern United States, Midwestern United States, Great Lakes region
- IBTrACS
- Part of the 2005 Atlantic hurricane season

Hurricane Rita was the most intense tropical cyclone on record in the Gulf of Mexico, tied with Hurricane Milton of 2024, as well as being one of the most intense Atlantic hurricanes on record overall. Part of the record-breaking 2005 Atlantic hurricane season, which included three of the ten most intense Atlantic hurricanes in terms of barometric pressure ever recorded (along with Wilma and Katrina), Rita was the seventeenth named storm, tenth hurricane, fifth major hurricane, (Note: A major hurricane is one that ranks at Category 3 or higher on the Saffir–Simpson scale.) and third Category 5 hurricane of the 2005 season. It was also the earliest-forming 17th named storm in the Atlantic until Tropical Storm Rene in 2020. Rita formed near The Bahamas from a tropical wave on September 18, 2005, that originally developed off the coast of West Africa. It moved westward, and after passing through the Florida Straits, Rita entered an environment of abnormally warm waters. Moving west-northwest, it rapidly intensified to reach peak winds of 180 mph (285 km/h), (Note: All values for sustained wind estimates are sustained over 1 minute, unless otherwise specified.) achieving Category 5 status on September 21. However, it weakened to a Category 3 hurricane before making landfall in Johnson's Bayou, Louisiana, between Sabine Pass, Texas, and Holly Beach, Louisiana, with winds of 115 mph (185 km/h). Rapidly weakening over land, Rita degenerated into a large low-pressure area over the lower Mississippi Valley by September 26.

In Louisiana, Rita's storm surge inundated low-lying communities along the entire coast, worsening effects caused by Hurricane Katrina less than a month prior, such as topping the hurriedly-repaired Katrina-damaged levees at New Orleans. Parishes in Southwest Louisiana and counties in Southeast Texas where Rita made landfall suffered from severe to catastrophic flooding and wind damage. In all, nine Texas counties and five Louisiana Parishes were declared disaster areas after the storm. Electric service was disrupted in some areas of both Texas and Louisiana for several weeks. Texas reported the most deaths from the hurricane, where 113 deaths were reported, 107 of which were associated with the evacuation of the Houston metropolitan area.

Moderate to severe damage was reported across the lower Mississippi Valley. Rainfall from the storm and its associated remnants extended from Louisiana to Michigan. Rainfall peaked at 16.00 in (406 mm) in Central Louisiana. Several tornadoes were also associated with the hurricane and its subsequent remnants. Throughout the path of Rita, damage totaled about $18.5 billion (2005 USD). As many as 120 deaths in four U.S. states were directly related to the hurricane.

== Meteorological history ==
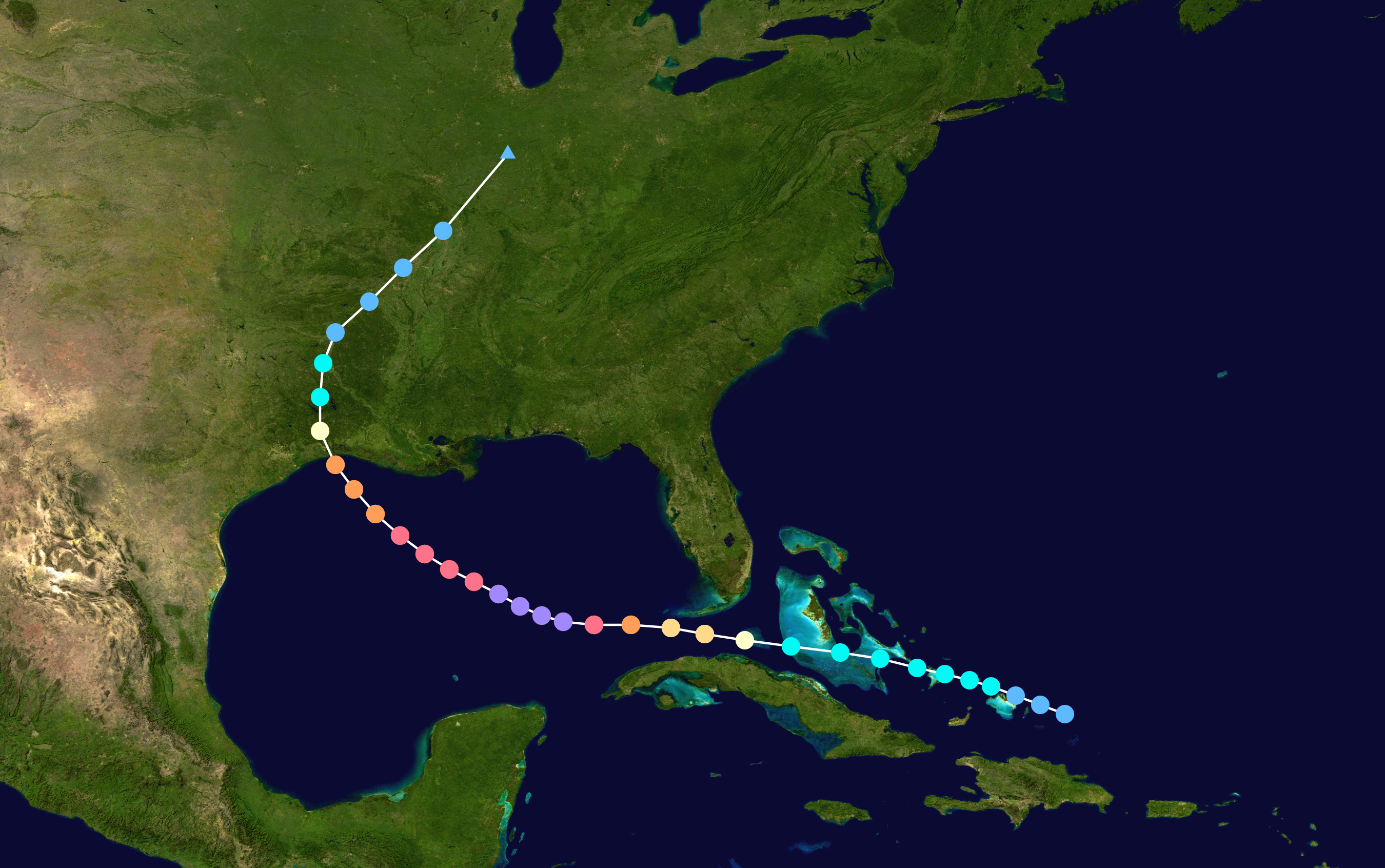
Map plotting the storm's track and intensity, according to the Saffir–Simpson scale Map key Saffir–Simpson scale Tropical depression (≤38 mph, ≤62 km/h) Tropical storm (39–73 mph, 63–118 km/h) Category 1 (74–95 mph, 119–153 km/h) Category 2 (96–110 mph, 154–177 km/h) Category 3 (111–129 mph, 178–208 km/h) Category 4 (130–156 mph, 209–251 km/h) Category 5 (≥157 mph, ≥252 km/h) Unknown Storm type Tropical cyclone Subtropical cyclone Extratropical cyclone, remnant low, tropical disturbance, or monsoon depression

On September 7, 2005, a tropical wave emerged off the west coast of Africa and moved westward into the Atlantic Ocean. Failing to produce organized, deep atmospheric convection, the disturbance was not monitored by the National Hurricane Center (NHC) for tropical cyclogenesis. Convection associated with the system increased briefly late on September 13 before dissipating shortly thereafter. At roughly the same time, a remnant surface trough had developed from a dissipating stationary front and began to drift westward north of the Lesser Antilles. Meanwhile, the tropical wave slowly became better organized and was first noted in the NHC's Tropical Weather Outlooks on September 15 while northeast of Puerto Rico. The wave merged with the surface trough two days later, triggering an increase in convective activity and organization. A subsequent decrease in wind shear enabled additional organization, and at 00:00 UTC on September 18, the NHC estimated that the storm system had organized enough to be classified as a tropical depression, the eighteenth disturbance during the hurricane season to do so. At the time, the disturbance, classified as Tropical Depression Eighteen, was roughly 80 mi (130 km) east of Grand Turk Island in the Turks and Caicos and had developed banding features.

In generally favorable conditions for tropical development, the depression quickly organized and attained tropical storm strength at 18:00 UTC that day based on data from reconnaissance flights, nearby ships, and weather buoys. As a result, the tropical storm was named Rita. However, an increase in moderate southerly vertical wind shear as the result of a nearby upper-level low subdued continued intensification and displaced convective activity to the north of Rita's center of circulation. Once the upper-level low weakened, Rita's center of circulation reformed to the north, compensating for the disorganization that resulted from the wind shear. Consequently, the tropical storm resumed its previous strengthening trend as it was steered westward across The Bahamas along the south periphery of a ridge. Upon entering the Straits of Florida on September 20, Rita strengthened into a Category 1 hurricane by 12:00 UTC, while maintaining a minimum barometric pressure of 985 mbar (hPa; 29.09 inHg). Six hours later, Rita intensified further into Category 2 before subsequently passing approximately 45 mi (72 km) south of Key West, Florida. Aided by favorable outflow and anomalously warm sea surface temperatures (SSTs), the trend of rapid deepening continued, and Rita reached Category 3 status upon entering the Gulf of Mexico by 06:00 UTC on September 21, making it a major hurricane.

Most intense Atlantic hurricanes
Rank	Hurricane	Season	Pressure	
Rank	Hurricane	Season	hPa	inHg
1	Wilma	2005	882	26.05
2	Gilbert	1988	888	26.23
3	"Labor Day"	1935	892	26.34
3	Melissa	2025	892	26.34
5	Rita	2005	895	26.43
5	Milton	2024	895	26.43
7	Allen	1980	899	26.55
8	Camille	1969	900	26.58
9	Katrina	2005	902	26.64
10	Mitch	1998	905	26.73
10	Dean	2007	905	26.73
Source: HURDAT

Once in the Gulf of Mexico, Rita passed over the extremely warm Loop Current during the midday hours of September 21, enabling continued strengthening. As a result, the hurricane's wind field significantly expanded and the storm's barometric pressure quickly fell. By 18:00 UTC that day, Rita attained Category 5 hurricane intensity, the highest category on the Saffir–Simpson hurricane wind scale. Rita's intensification phase was accompanied by an unprecedentedly abundant outbreak of lightning within the storm's eyewall. Favorable conditions allowed for additional strengthening, and at 0300 UTC on September 22, Rita reached its peak intensity with maximum sustained winds of 180 mph (285 km/h) and a minimum barometric pressure of 895 mbar (hPa; 26.43 inHg), making it the strongest tropical cyclone ever recorded in the Gulf of Mexico and up until that point the third strongest hurricane in Atlantic history. At the time, it was located 310 mi (500 km) south of the Mississippi River Delta.

Rita maintained Category 5 hurricane intensity for 18 hours before an eyewall replacement cycle took place, weakening the hurricane to Category 4 intensity by 18:00 UTC on September 22. As a result of the cycle, a new, larger eyewall consolidated, resulting in Rita's wind field expanding. At the same time, the tropical cyclone began to curve northwestward around the southwestern periphery of a ridge of high pressure over the Southeastern United States. Due to wind shear and cooler continental shelf waters, the hurricane continued to weaken. Rita weakened to Category 3 strength before making landfall at 07:40 UTC on September 24 in extreme southwestern Louisiana between Johnson Bayou and Sabine Pass. At the time of landfall, Rita was a Category 3 hurricane with winds of 115 mph (185 km/h) and a barometric pressure of 937 mbar (hPa; 27.67 inHg).

Once inland on September 24, Rita began to rapidly weaken. The tropical cyclone had been downgraded to tropical storm intensity nearly 12 hours after landfall. Proceeding northward roughly parallel to the state border between Louisiana and Texas, radar imagery indicated that the storm soon lacked winds of tropical storm-force. Therefore, the NHC classified the system as a tropical depression while it was over Arkansas by 06:00 UTC on September 25, shortly before it turned northeastward ahead of an approaching frontal boundary. Early the next day, the depression lost much of its convection over southeastern Illinois, and degenerated into a remnant low by 06:00 UTC that day. The frontal boundary subsequently absorbed the remaining system six hours later over the southern Great Lakes region.

== Preparations ==
=== Bahamas ===
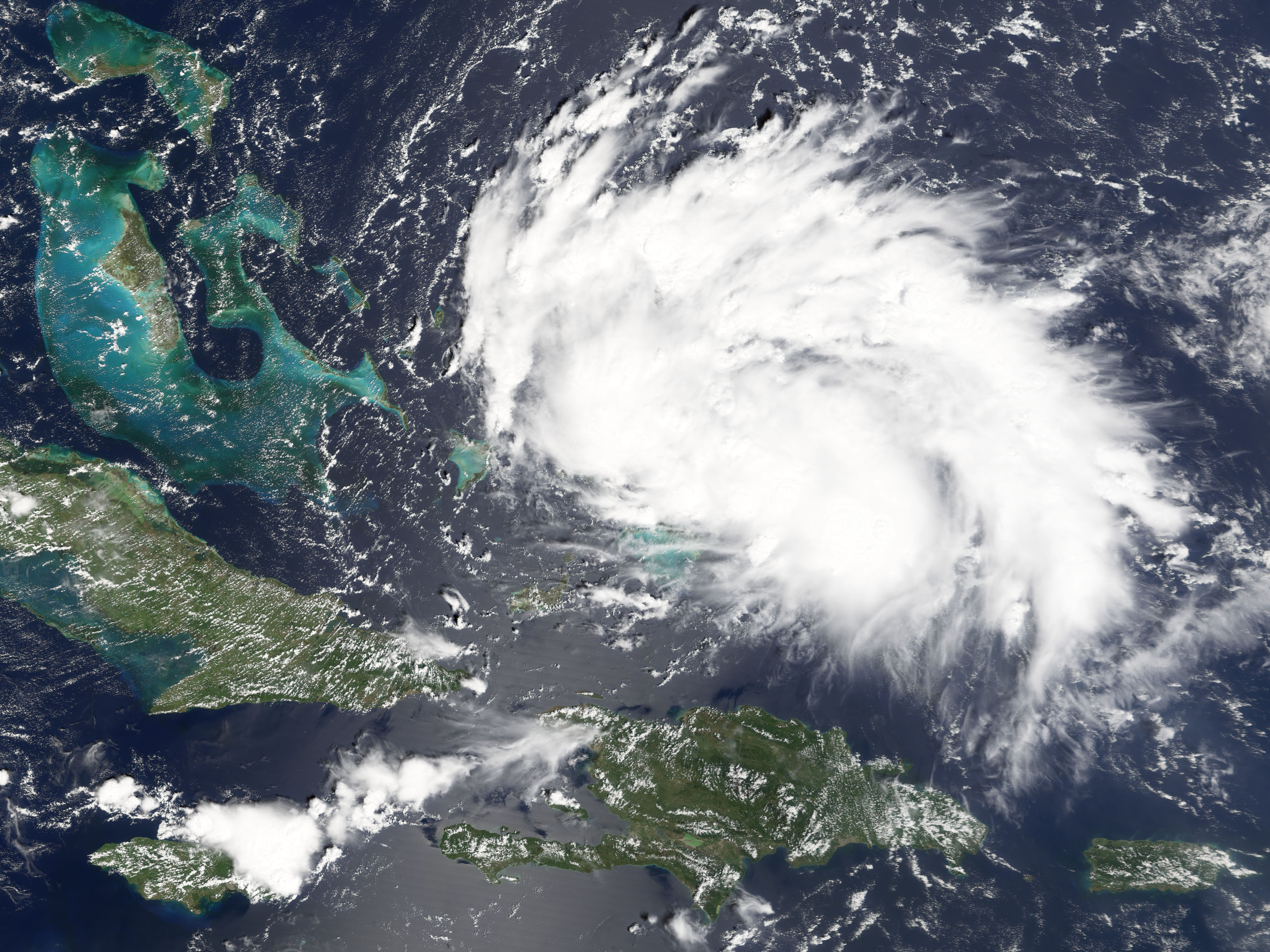
Tropical Storm Rita over the eastern Bahamas on September 18

At 0300 UTC on September 18, a tropical storm warning was issued for the Turks and Caicos and the Southeast and Central Bahamas. At the same time, a hurricane watch was also issued for the northwest Bahamas. By 0600 UTC the following day, the hurricane watch was upgraded to a hurricane warning for the northwest Bahamas excluding Grand Bahama and the Abaco Islands which were later put under a tropical storm warning. Several hours later, a hurricane warning was issued for Exuma and Andros Island. At 1800 UTC, the tropical storm warning for the Turks and Caicos was discontinued as the threat from Rita diminished. This discontinuation later included the southeast Bahamas. By 1500 UTC on September 20, all watches and warnings for the islands were discontinued as Rita moved into the Gulf of Mexico. Residents in the Bahamas were urged to board up their homes and stock up on emergency supplies. At least one shelter was opened and schools throughout the country were closed. The Nassau International Airport was also closed due to the storm on September 19 and would remain closed until the evening of September 20.

=== Cuba ===
Officials in Cuba warned residents of possible impacts from Rita and closed public facilities in northern areas. Some evacuations took place in villages near the northern coastline and several shelters were opened. An estimated 150,000 people were evacuated in northern Cuba ahead of the storm. About 600 shelters were opened in Havana which could house a total of 120,000 people. In western Cuba, more than 42,000 were given shelter in Matanzas, 31,000 in Villa Claro and 6,300 in Sancti Spiritus. In Havana, power was turned off at noon on September 19 to protect transformers, this also led to the disruption of natural gas lines. A large-scale preparation was put in place by the Ministry of Health in Cuba. A total of 14,859 medical personnel were mobilized to quickly assist residents impacted by Rita. The personnel consisted of 3,767 doctors, 5,143 nurses, 2,139 specialists, 1,072 health officials, and 2,738 other staff members. A total of 519 vehicles were also mobilized; it included 241 ambulances, 36 trucks, 21 panels, and 221 other vehicles. Throughout northern Cuba, a total of 1,486 shelters were opened, most of which were filled during the evacuation.

=== Florida ===
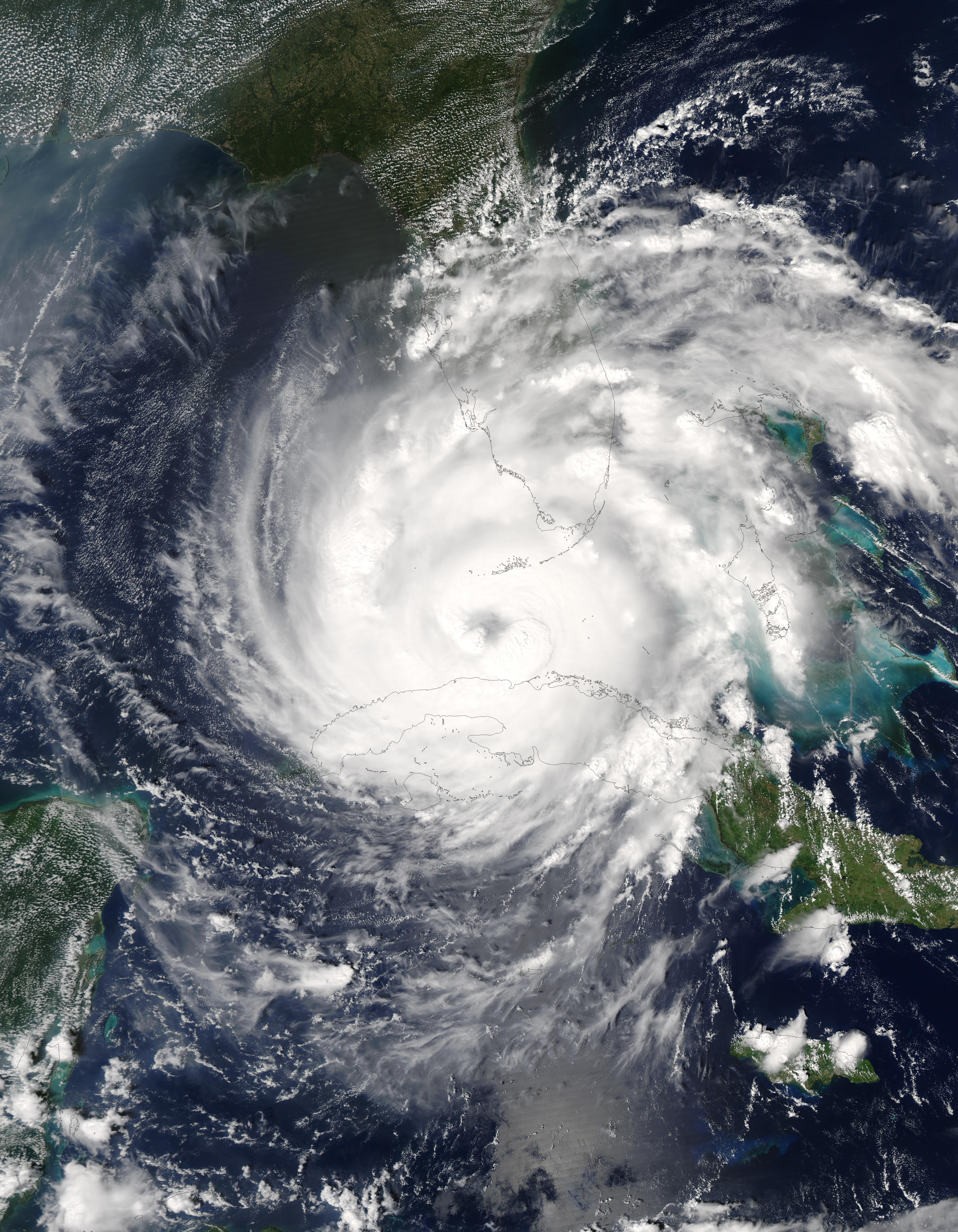
Hurricane Rita as a Category 2 hurricane crossing the Florida Straits

On September 18, when Rita was declared a tropical storm, phased evacuations began in the Florida Keys. All tourists were told to evacuate the Lower Keys immediately and residents in mobile homes were told to prepare to evacuate. By September 20, mandatory evacuations were in place for the 80,000 residents of the Keys. Both lanes on Route 1 were directed northbound to speed up evacuations. City busses picked up those who did not have transportation out of the Keys. An estimated 2.3 million people in Miami-Dade County were warned about the possibility of a direct hit on Miami and told to prepare to evacuate. A State of Emergency was declared ahead of Rita later that day by President George W. Bush. This would allow federal assistance to aid the affected areas in the wake of the storm. Throughout Florida, a total of 340,000 people were placed under mandatory or voluntary evacuation orders.

Five shelters were opened in southern Florida with a total capacity of 4,335 people. Tolls on northbound roads were lifted in Monroe County. A total of four hospitals, three assisted living facilities, and two nursing homes were evacuated. Military support in the form of 7,000 soldiers, eight Black Hawk helicopters, two Chinook helicopters, three Kiowa helicopters, one Huron aircraft, one Short 360 aircraft, one Hercules aircraft, and one Metroliner aircraft was provided. A task force was put on standby in Homestead Air Reserve Base to quickly deploy in affected areas.

The United States Department of Agriculture prepared food to deliver to affected areas after Rita. The United States Department of Defense deployed personnel to coordinate evacuations. The United States Department of Health and Human Services sent fully equipped medical teams and supplies if needed. The United States Department of Homeland Security pre-positioned over 100 trucks of ice and packed food to deliver following Rita. Two helicopters and one Cheyenne aircraft were also provided to assist with recovery efforts. The United States Department of the Interior shut down all national parks in Florida and evacuated workers in low-lying areas. Military cargo planes evacuated hospital patients from three acute-care hospitals in the Keys.

=== Offshore Gulf of Mexico ===
Ahead of the storm, oil companies evacuated workers on offshore platforms by helicopter and boat beginning on September 21. The hurricane threatened a large amount of oil infrastructure that was left undamaged by Katrina. Rita's passage closed 16 oil refineries, after the ports of Houston, Freeport, Port Arthur, and Corpus Christi were all closed. Including four facilities still damaged from Hurricane Katrina, the 20 closed refineries represented about one-third of the United States' refining capacity. The temporary closures caused the price of gas to rise about 10 cents per gallon. To conserve fuel for school buses, Georgia Governor Sonny Perdue declared what he termed "snow days", requesting that all schools close for two days; all but four districts agreed.

=== Louisiana ===
On Tuesday, Sep 20, Louisiana Governor Kathleen Blanco issued a state of emergency for all parishes in the southwestern region of Louisiana and requested in writing of President George W. Bush that he issue a federal state of emergency for the entire state. Refugees still at the New Orleans Convention Center and Superdome were being evacuated as a precaution, and national guard troops and other emergency personnel in for the Hurricane Katrina aftermath were being mobilized to evacuate. Select military personnel stayed in New Orleans for Hurricane Rita including Task Force California (2-185 Armor and 1-184 Infantry).

By the morning of Wednesday, Sep 21, as Rita's strength, course and speed became clearer, officials of Cameron Parish, Calcasieu Parish, and parts of Jefferson Davis Parish, Acadia Parish, Iberia Parish, Beauregard Parish, and Vermillion Parish began to strongly encourage residents to evacuate ahead of the storm, with a 6:00 p.m. Thursday deadline set. Most residents followed the recommendations of their respective officials, hitting the road by the deadline, though many returned home and waited until early the next morning after encountering severe traffic delays. Southern Cameron Parish residents, used to frequent evacuations, were gone by noon on Thursday; when parish officials returned to the Hwy. 27 "Gibbstown Bridge" that crosses the Intracoastal Canal into Lower Cameron Parish two days later in preparation of damage inspection and rescue of any stranded or injured residents, no one was known to have remained.

=== Texas ===
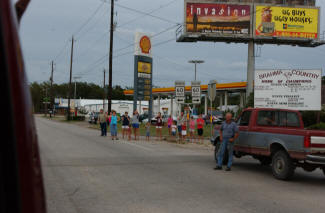
Motorists stranded on Highway 60 during Hurricane Rita evacuation.

Texas Governor Rick Perry recalled all emergency personnel, including almost 1,200 Texas National Guard, 1,100 Texas State Guard, and several hundred Texas Game Wardens from Katrina recovery efforts in anticipation of Hurricane Rita's arrival. In addition, the Federal Government deployed 11 Disaster Medical Assistance Teams (DMATs), staging them in mobile field hospitals across eastern Texas. The teams treated 7,500 patients during the response. On September 22, Governor Perry and the Texas Department of Transportation implemented a contraflow lane reversal on Interstate 45 north towards Dallas, on Interstate 10 west towards San Antonio, U.S. Highway 290 northwest to Austin.

As part of the evacuation, Johnson Space Center in Houston handed off control of the International Space Station to their Russian counterparts.

==== Mass evacuation ====
Just three weeks after Hurricane Katrina devastated the northern Gulf Coast, the threat of yet another major hurricane prompted mass evacuations in coastal Texas. An estimated 2.5 – 3.7 million people fled prior to Rita's landfall, making it the largest evacuation in United States' history.

Officials in Galveston County (which includes the city of Galveston) ordered mandatory evacuations, effective September 21 at 6 p.m., in a staggered sequence. Officials designated geographical zones in the area to facilitate an orderly evacuation. People were scheduled to leave at different times over a 24-hour period depending on the zone in which the people were located. The scheduled times were set well in advance of the storm's possible landfall later in the week, but not soon enough to ensure that all residents could evacuate safely in advance of the storm. Nonetheless, many residents remained in the county because they were either unaware of the danger of the storm or believed that it was more important to protect their belongings, particularly in the wake of looting following Hurricane Katrina. The evacuation included transfer of all inpatients from the University of Texas Medical Branch hospital to other regional hospitals. 400 patients were prisoners under the ward of the Texas Department of Criminal Justice. These patients were systematically transferred to the University of Texas Health Center at Tyler.

Officials of Harris County hoped that the designation of zones A, B, and C would help prevent bottlenecks in traffic leaving the area similar to those seen at New Orleans prior to Katrina and Hurricane Dennis earlier that year. Also, people in certain zones were to be forced to go to certain cities in Texas and were not allowed to exit their designated routes except for food and gas – another feature of the evacuation plan which officials hoped would keep traffic flow orderly.

The evacuation-destination cities included Austin, College Station, San Antonio, Dallas, Huntsville, and Lufkin, Texas. Evacuees were asked to try hotels in the Midland/Odessa area when hotels began to sell out in other areas.

On Wednesday, Houston mayor Bill White urged residents to evacuate the city, telling residents, "Don't wait; the time for waiting is over," reminding residents of the disaster in New Orleans. After heavy traffic snarled roads leading out of town and gas shortages left numerous vehicles stranded, Mayor White backed off his earlier statement with, "If you're not in the evacuation zone, follow the news," advising people to use common sense. However, by 3:00 p.m. that afternoon, the freeway system in Houston was at a standstill.

To the east of Houston, officials had set up evacuation routes in response to the slow evacuation of residents prior to Hurricane Lili. During the Rita evacuation, these preparations and their execution were overwhelmed by the enormous and unprecedented number of people fleeing from the Houston area prior to the departure of local residents. By the time Jefferson County began their mandatory evacuation, local roads were already full of Houstonians. Traffic on designated evacuation routes was forced to go far slower than the speeds experienced with any previous hurricane.

By late Thursday (22nd) morning, the contraflow lanes had been ordered opened after officials determined that the state's highway system had become gridlocked. The Texas Department of Transportation was unprepared to execute such a large-scale evacuation. Coordination and implementation of the contraflow plan took 8 to 10 hours as inbound traffic was forced to exit. Police were stationed to assist with traffic flow. Evacuees fought traffic Wednesday afternoon through mid-day Friday, moving only a fraction of the normal distance expected. Average travel times to Dallas were 24–36 hours, travel times to Austin were 12–18 hours and travel times to San Antonio were 10–16 hours, depending on the point of departure in Houston. Many motorists ran out of gas or experienced breakdowns in temperatures that neared 100 °F (38 °C). Traffic volumes did not ease for nearly 48 hours as more than three million residents evacuated the area in advance of the storm.

==== Evacuation deaths ====
As an estimated 2.5 – 3.7 million people evacuated the Texas coastline, a significant heat wave affected the region. The combination of severe gridlock and excessive heat led to between 90 and 118 deaths even before the storm arrived. Reports from the Houston Chronicle indicated 107 evacuation-related fatalities. Texas Representative Garnet Coleman criticized the downplay of the deaths in the evacuation and questioned whether the storm would be deadlier than the preparations. According to local officials, the traffic reached a point where residents felt safer riding out the storm at home rather than being stuck in traffic when Rita struck. Many evacuees periodically turned off their air conditioning to reduce fuel consumption as well as drank less water to limit the number of restroom stops. According to a post-storm study, which reported 90 evacuation-related deaths, nine people perished solely as a result of hyperthermia. However, it was suspected that most of the 67 deaths attributed to heat stress were a combination of hyperthermia and chronic health conditions. In addition to the heat-related deaths, 23 nursing home evacuees were killed after a bus caught fire on Interstate 45 near Wilmer. The bus erupted into flames after the vehicle's rear axle overheated due to insufficient lubrication. According to a resident near the site of the accident, there were three explosions. Many of the passengers were mobility-impaired making escape difficult or impossible. In June 2009, nearly four years after the fire, families of those who died in the accident won an $80 million settlement against the manufacturer of the bus and the company that provided the nursing home with it.

== Impact ==
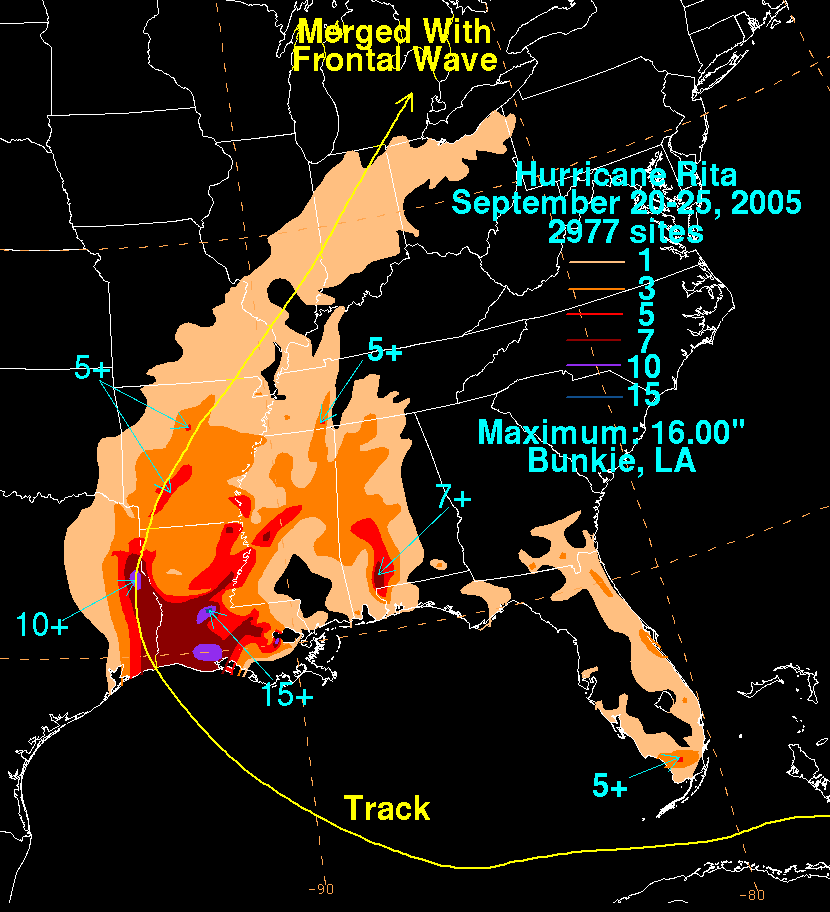
Hurricane Rita Rainfall

In some areas, the effects of Hurricane Rita were not nearly as severe as anticipated. The storm surge feared in Galveston and Houston struck farther east as the storm's center came ashore at the Louisiana border. Rain in New Orleans was lighter than expected. Still, a storm surge of up to 18 feet (5.5 m) struck southwestern Louisiana, and coastal parishes experienced extensive damage. In Cameron Parish, the communities of Holly Beach, Hackberry, Cameron, Creole and Grand Chenier were essentially destroyed. There were also severe impacts, mainly due to wind, in inland parishes and counties across Southwest Louisiana and Southeast Texas, respectively. Cities such as Beaumont, Texas and Lake Charles, Louisiana, as well as surrounding communities, suffered extensive wind damage.

An estimated two million people lost electricity.

In the Gulf of Mexico, the hurricane destroyed 66 oil platforms and four drilling rigs, while also causing severe damage to 32 platforms and 10 rigs. The hurricane halted the entirety of the country's gulf oil production, along with 80% of its natural gas production.

=== Deaths ===
The reported death toll for Hurricane Rita was 120. Only seven were direct deaths (Note: Direct deaths are those that occur as a direct result of the physical force of the storm, such as drownings in storm surge flooding and deaths in collapsing structures due to wind. Indirect deaths are those occurring due to things such as heart attacks, electrocution from downed powerlines, and carbon monoxide poisoning due to improper generator use.). One was caused by a tornado spawned in the storm's outer bands, one was due to storm surge flooding and three others were caused by trees blown down in the storm. The two Florida deaths both occurred in rip currents caused by Rita's distant waves.

State	State total	County/Parish	Reported deaths	Direct deaths
Florida	2	Escambia	1	1
Florida	2	Walton	1	1
Louisiana	1	Calcasieu	1	1
Mississippi	4	Humphreys	1	1
Mississippi	4	Pike	3	0
Texas	113	Angelina	2	1
Texas	113	Dallas	23	0
Texas	113	Galveston	36	0
Texas	113	Harris	35	0
Texas	113	Jefferson	6	0
Texas	113	Liberty	2	2
Texas	113	Montgomery	2	0
Texas	113	Shelby	1	0
Texas	113	Walker	3	0
Totals	120		117	7
Because of differing sources, totals may not match.

=== Caribbean ===
As Rita developed near the Turks and Caicos Islands, it dropped up to 5 in (130 mm) of rain but caused little damage. Throughout the Bahamas, swells produced by Rita reached 10 ft (3.0 m) and storm surge was estimated at 3 to 5 ft (0.91 to 1.52 m). Strong winds were reported across the islands, but no damage resulted from the storm.

The eye of the hurricane tracked 54 mi (87 km) north of Havana at around 4 p.m. local time on September 20. Heavy rains and strong winds associated with the outer rainbands of Hurricane Rita buffeted the northern coast of Cuba, with sustained winds potentially reaching as high as 60 mph (100 km/h). In a two-hour span, more than 8.2 in (210 mm) of rain fell in Bauta. Tropical storm-force winds were primarily limited to the northern coasts of Cuba's western provinces, with heavy rainfall extending into interior portions of the country. Rita's effects produced widespread damage both in northern and southern parts of Cuba, but did not cause fatalities. Most affected were the provinces of La Habana, Havana, and Matanzas. Slight damage was wrought to the Cuban power grid, resulting as many as 400,000 people losing power in Havana. High waves from Rita inundated 20 low-lying city blocks in the Vedado neighborhood of Havana between noon September 19 and the morning of September 20. Flash flooding also impacted parts of downtown Havana after roughly 5 in (130 mm) of rain fell over the city. The torrential rains led to the collapse of 34 homes in the city. Storm surge along the southern coast of La Habana advanced 1 mi (1.6 km) onshore at Guanímar, prompting evacuations. No casualties were reported by Agencia de Información Nacional (AIN), the state news agency.

=== United States ===
Throughout the United States, Hurricane Rita caused about $18.5 billion in damage.

==== Florida ====
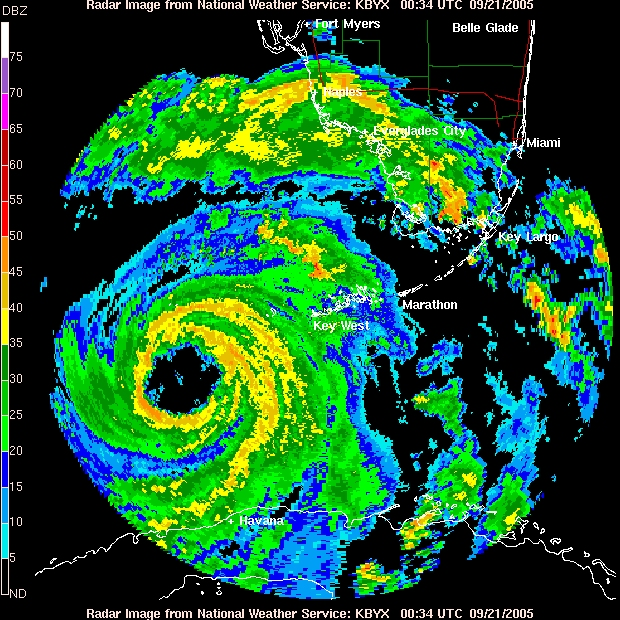
Weather radar image of Rita as viewed from Key West on the evening of September 20

While passing south of the Florida Keys, Rita may have briefly produced hurricane-force winds along the southernmost parts of the islands. Sustained tropical storm-force winds affected much of the Keys, with peak sustained winds of 62 mph (100 km/h recorded at Key West International Airport, punctuated by a gust of 76 mph (122 km/h). A Coastal-Marine Automated Network station on Sand Key measured winds of 72 mph (117 km/h) from an elevated position, sustained over 10 minutes, and a peak gust of 92 mph (150 km/h). Tropical storm-force gusts extended farther into the southern Florida Peninsula south of Lake Okeechobee on September 20. On the Florida mainland, gusts peaked at 55 mph (89 km/h) at Fort Lauderdale–Hollywood International Airport, while sustained winds topped out at 39 mph (63 km/h) at Miami Beach. The passing hurricane generated a 3–5 ft (0.91–1.52 m) storm surge along the Florida Keys, with the highest storm surge occurring along the southern shores of the Lower Keys. In the Everglades National Park, a station called Tenraw recorded 5.32 in (135 mm), which was the highest rainfall total in the state. Accumulations were estimated by radar to have exceeded 10 in (250 mm) within a 20 mi (32 km) wide swath over the everglades in southwestern Miami-Dade County and Monroe County, Florida.

Homes and businesses were damaged by storm surge in the Florida Keys. The storm surge in Key West advanced four blocks inland, flooding streets to a depth of 3 ft (0.91 m) and inundating the runway at Key West International Airport. As many as 200 residential properties were damaged by the surge in the city. One bicyclist was seriously injured by the high waves in Key West. High waters also advanced over U.S. Route 1 at Islamorada. Wind damage from the hurricane in the Keys was limited to roofing and trees, with the bulk of wind damage occurring in Key West. About 7,000 electricity customers were without power on the Florida Keys on the night of September 18. Damage was relatively light on the Florida mainland, where no casualties were reported. Flooding was also generally minor on the mainland, though the hardest-hit areas were affected by Hurricane Katrina a month prior. Power outages affected around 126,000 electricity customers in primarily Broward and Miami-Dade counties.

Rough surf generated by Rita later caused minor to moderate beach erosion along the coast of the Florida Panhandle on September 22, including Franklin, Taylor, Walton, and Wakulla counties. Rita's effects exacerbated the erosion caused by a string of several other nearby storms beginning with Hurricane Ivan in 2004. The damage from coastal erosion amounted to roughly $200,000. Over a dozen people were rescued after venturing into the rough seas generated by Rita off Pensacola Beach. Two were hospitalized and one person died after collapsing offshore, though it was unclear whether the fatality was directly attributable to the hurricane. Another person drowned in a rip current off Miramar Beach.

==== Louisiana ====
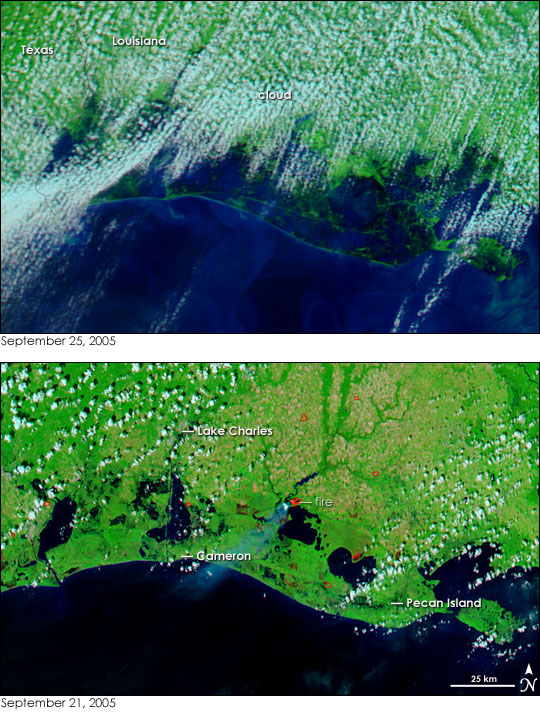
Two satellite images showing the extent of flooding caused by Rita in Louisiana and Texas.

Although Rita weakened before it made landfall in Louisiana, it still produced a significant storm surge, which reached 16.2 ft (4.9 m) in Cameron. The city also recorded sustained winds of 77 mph (124 km/h), with gusts to 112 mph (180 km/h), before the anemometer failed. As the eyewall moved ashore, Rita produced Category 3 winds in a very small area, although tropical storm-force winds extended as far east as Baton Rouge. Farther inland, Lake Charles recorded gusts to 96 mph (154 km/h). Shreveport recorded a wind gust of 53 mph (85 km/h) and a minimum pressure of 984 millibars (29.1 inHg), their second-lowest on record. Much of the state's coastline had above normal tides, reaching 4 to 7 ft (1.2 to 2.1 m) above normal in southeastern Louisiana. The floodwaters adding to the devastation caused by Hurricane Katrina a month earlier, damaging levees in Jefferson and Terrebonne parishes, as well as levees that had been repaired near New Orleans. The city, still flooded since Katrina, remained flooded until October 11. The hurricane also dropped heavy rainfall in Louisiana, reaching 16.00 in (406 mm) in Bunkie. In the Green Canyon offshore southern Louisiana, strong waves from Rita broke a tension-leg platform from its moorings. It was decommissioned and turned into a reef site.

Hurricane Rita left $4 billion in damage across southwestern Louisiana. The hurricane's impacts were varied across the state. One man drowned in Lake Charles near a sunken shrimp boat. After its passage, more than 1 million people were without power in the state, including residents still without power after Katrina.

In Cameron Parish in extreme southwestern Louisiana, the damage was estimated at $2.75 billion. More than 90% of the buildings in the parish were destroyed or severely damaged, including more than 5,000 houses. The storm surge and high waves destroyed nearly every building destroyed between Cameron and Creole, including many that were washed away. Floodwaters leveled the community of Holly Beach, leaving behind only roads, power lines, and the concrete slabs. The city also lost about 58.7 ft (17.9 m) of beach through erosion. When assessing the hurricane's effects in its post-season report, the NHC noted that "since so many structures were completely destroyed, and because many gauges failed up to several hours before the center of the hurricane crossed the coast... measuring the storm surge [was] a daunting task." The peak storm surge was determined based on high water marks in Cameron reaching the second story of a courthouse and at the hospital. Also across the parish, strong winds knocked down trees and power lines.

Storm surge flooding reached as far inland as Lake Charles, after moving up the Calcasieu River. In the city, the floodwaters reached 6 ft (1.8 m) deep in the downtown area. The waters pushed boats onto a railroad bridge. Farther inland, tropical storm-force wind gusts affected northwestern Louisiana, strong enough to knock down trees and power lines, which damaged homes and vehicles. Other areas of Lake Charles also experienced severe flooding, with reports of water rising 6–8 feet, at one point inundating the lower floors of the Lake Charles Civic Center. At a hotel on a section of the Contraband Bayou near Interstate 210 and Prien Lake Road, water reportedly rose as high as the second floor. There was extensive minor-to-major structural wind damage across the entire area, including the near-devastation of the Lake Charles Regional Airport south of the city. Damage to the entire region's electrical and communications infrastructure was severe, and authorities warned returning residents that restoration of services to some areas would take weeks to months.

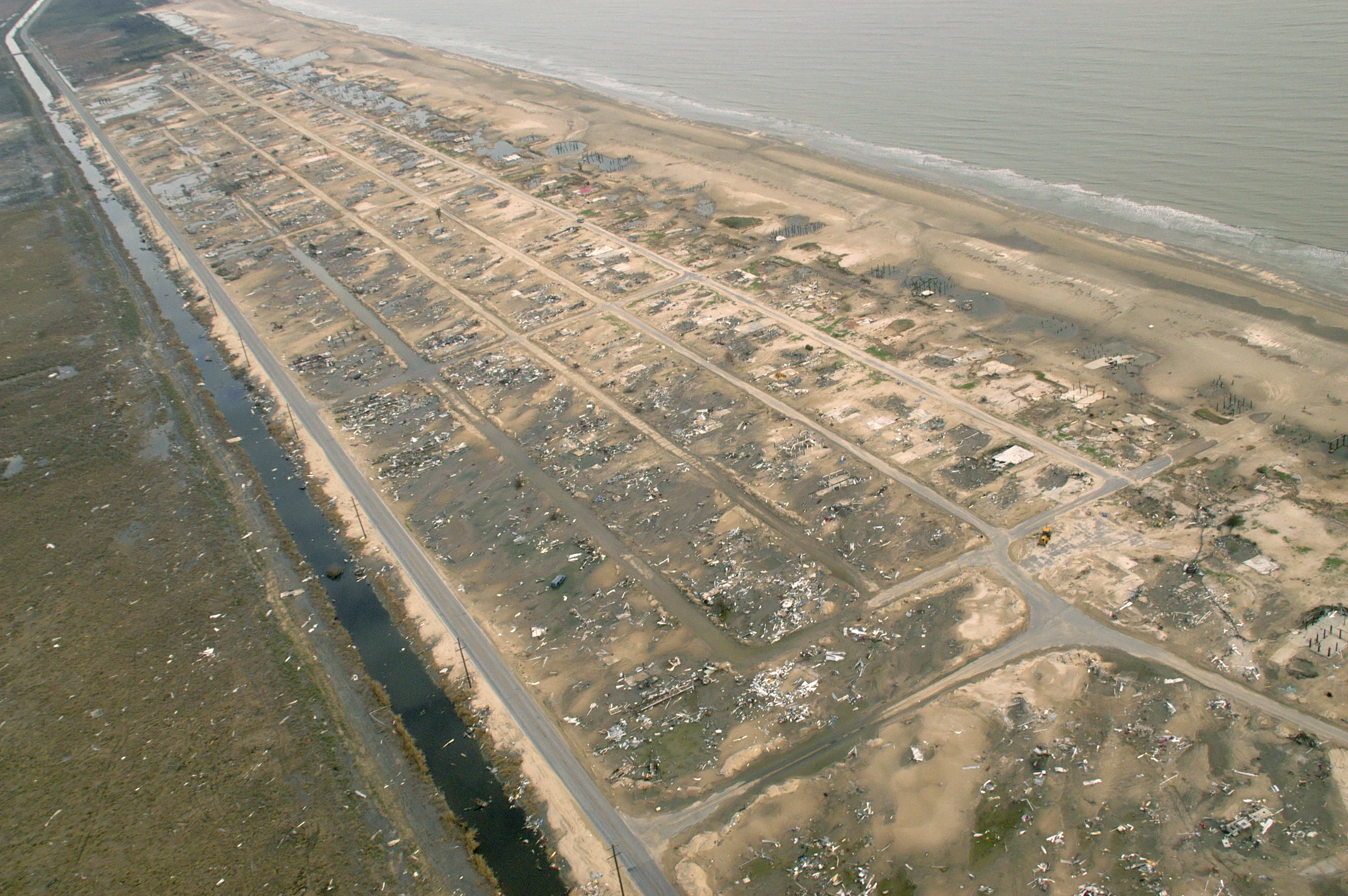
Holly Beach was almost completely leveled by Rita's storm surge

In Vermilion Parish east of its landfall location, Rita's storm surge damaged dozens of homes and businesses, including most of the structures on Pecan Island. The floodwaters damaged a driveway to a lock and dam in Intracoastal City, and also damaged shrimp boats. The floodwaters inundated parts of U.S. Route 90 in St. Mary Parish. Rescue efforts were undertaken for up to 1,000 people stranded by local flooding. On Saturday, September 24 alone, 250 people were rescued.

In southeast Louisiana's Terrebonne Parish, storm surge reached 7 ft (2.1 m) flooding an estimated 10,000 homes. Virtually every levee was breached. Some people were stranded in flooded communities and had to be rescued by boat. At least 100 people were reported rescued from rooftops. Along Lake Pontchartrain, flooding entered homes and businesses in Slidell and Mandeville. In New Orleans, the storm pushed water over gravel berms serving as temporary flood barriers in the Lower Ninth Ward.

Much of northwest Louisiana experienced tropical storm force winds, causing damage mainly from falling trees. In Shreveport, heavy rainfall caused flash flooding on several streets, including a portion of I-20.

==== Texas ====
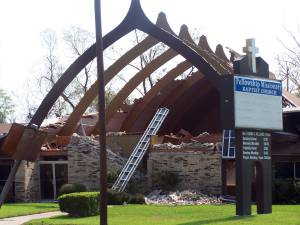
Church in Beaumont with roof ripped off by Hurricane Rita.

Making landfall in extreme southwestern Louisiana, Rita also produced widespread effects across southeastern Texas, with a significant inundation of at least 10 ft (3.0 m) at Sabine Pass. Most of the flooding occurred before Rita moved ashore. After it moved ashore however, northerly winds pushed the waters of Galveston Bay southward, causing flooding on Galveston Island and the Bolivar Peninsula. Isolated parts of southeastern Texas experienced Category 2 sustained winds. The highest recorded sustained wind in the state was 94 mph (151 km/h), recorded at Port Arthur. Wind gusts reached 105 mph (169 km/h) in Beaumont. An anemometer at Lake Livingston Dam recorded a wind gust of 117 mph (189 km/h). Elsewhere, there was also an unofficial wind gust of 116 mph (187 km/h) at Port Arthur. Rainfall in the state reached 10.48 in (266 mm) in the city of Center. There was an unofficial precipitation total of 12.50 in (318 mm) recorded at Silsbee. The hurricane caused beach erosion along Texas's coast as far south as South Padre Island. Along western Galveston, the erosion left houses on top of the beach in front of the dunes.

In addition to the deaths caused by the hurricane's evacuation, Rita caused several other fatalities in Texas. A fallen tree killed a couple in Hardin in Liberty County, and another fallen tree killed a three year-old in Point Blank in San Jacinto County. In Jasper County, a man was killed when a tree hit his mobile home. There were two deaths in Angelina County – one from a fallen tree, and one from an electrocution. In Montgomery County, three people died of carbon monoxide poisoning. Thirty-one deaths in Harris County were attributed to Rita, mostly related to the evacuation and cleanup. At an apartment complex in Beaumont, six people died from carbon monoxide poisoning.

Statewide, the hurricane left 1,122,892 people without power, which lasted as long as six weeks in Jasper and Newton counties. Damage was heaviest in southeastern Texas near where Rita moved ashore. Across the region, the strong winds knocked down trees and power lines, causing damage to more than 125,000 buildings. At Sabine Pass in Jefferson County, the floodwaters wrecked 90% of the homes. The powerful storm surge backed up the Sabine River, which flooded the downtown of Orange to a depth of 5 ft (1.5 m).

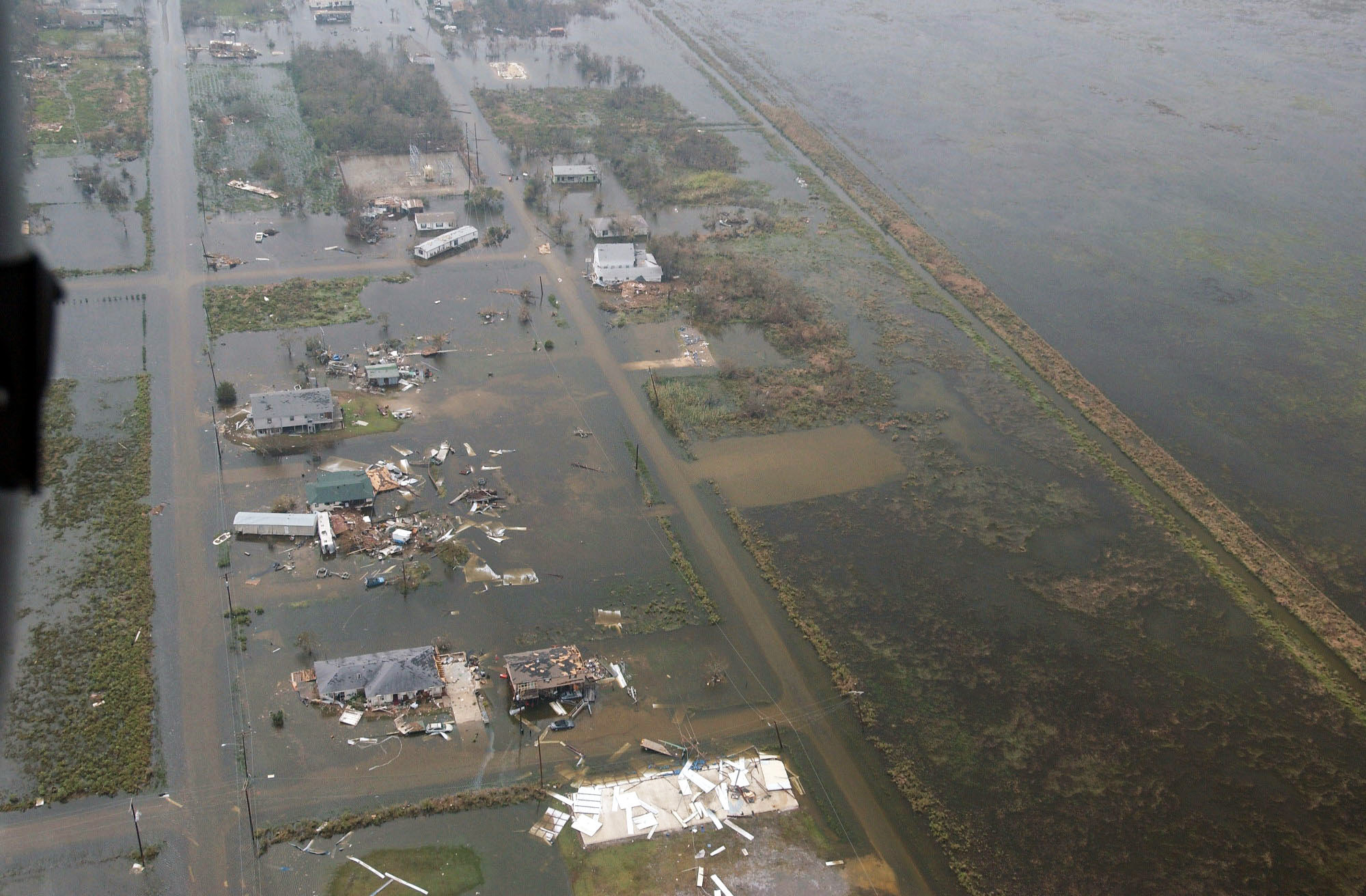
Floodwaters and destruction left in the aftermath of Hurricane Rita, in an area located near Galveston Bay, Texas.

Farther west of the immediate landfall area, tropical storm-force winds extended into the Greater Houston area, with $90 million worth of roof, fence, sign, and glass damage in Harris County. The power outages also caused significant loss of food inventory in grocery stores. For the most part, Houston escaped major damage, apart from extensive power interruptions. A few windows blew out of some downtown skyscrapers, and some trees and traffic signals were downed or damaged.

On Galveston Island, a fire broke out during the hurricane, destroying three buildings and causing three injuries – a woman sustained severe burns, and two firefighters had minor injuries. Most homes on the island had roof damage, and a three-story building collapsed.

Hurricane-force winds extended inland across eastern Texas, causing damage to an estimated 771,000 acres of timber. Cities in the "Golden Triangle" formed by Beaumont, Port Arthur, and Orange, sustained extensive wind damage. The water treatment plant in Port Neches was heavily damaged. According to an October 25, 2005, Disaster Center report, 4,526 single-family dwellings were destroyed in Orange and Jefferson counties. Major damage was sustained by 14,256 additional single-family dwellings, and another 26,211 single-family dwellings received minor damage. Mobile homes and apartments also sustained significant damage or total destruction.

Coastal areas farther south in Texas were flooded, including low-lying roadways in Corpus Christi. High tides occurred as far south as South Padre Island. There, the high waves and tides breached the dunes, closing beaches and inundating parts of Texas State Highway 100. The sand entered beachside condominiums, although there was little damage in the region. Farther inland in the Dallas–Fort Worth metroplex, the winds caused minor tree and roof damage.

North of Houston, the 2.5-mile-wide (4.0 km) Lake Livingston dam sustained substantial damage from powerful waves driven by wind gusts of up to 117 mph (188 km/h). The strong winds produced high waves and a 1.5 ft (0.46 m) storm surge along the dam, which caused $20 million worth of damage to the riprap, or support structure. Operators released water levels by 4 ft (1.2 m) to stabilize the structure. After water levels were lowered and an inspection was conducted by national and local experts, the dam was declared stable late on Monday, September 26, 2005.

==== Alabama and Mississippi ====
The effects of Rita extended into southern Alabama. Atmore recorded 8.67 in (220 mm) due to the hurricane, which was the state's highest precipitation from Rita.

In Alabama, the storm produced 22 weak tornadoes, mainly rated F0, causing minor isolated damage amounting to roughly $1.2 million. Heavy rains also fell in association with Rita in the state. Most of the western portions of Alabama received more than 3 inches (76 mm), with south-central portions peaking around 7 inches (180 mm).

Despite passing far west of the state, Rita produced gale-force winds in Mississippi, with sustained winds of 44 mph (70 km/h) observed in Gulfport. The same city recorded gusts to 52 mph (82 km/h). Rainfall in the state reached 8.44 in (214 mm) in Greenville. In Mississippi, Rita produced widespread rainfall upon its landfall in Louisiana; however, most of the rain fell early on September 25 as a band of heavy rain developed over parts of western Mississippi, northeast Louisiana and southern Arkansas, resulting in up to l10 in (250 mm) of rain around the Big Black River The heavy rainfall caused significant flooding in Yazoo and Warren Counties. In Yazoo, numerous homes had water inside and countywide damage amounted to $6 million. Damage in Warren County was less than Yazoo, amounting to $2.7 million. Holmes, Hinds and Madison Counties also had flooding, with damage in all three counties amounting to $2 million. Several roads were also flooded in Monroe County after 6 inches (150 mm) of rain fell. Winds up to 70 mph (110 km/h) downed numerous trees throughout the state. In Adams County, winds caused several trees to fall on homes in Natchez, leaving $270,000 in damage. In Warren County, a mobile home was destroyed after a tree was downed by high winds.

An unusually large amount of tornadoes touched down in the state due to Rita, with 49 confirmed in Mississippi alone. The size of the tornado outbreak ranked it as the largest recorded by the National Weather Service office in Jackson. Damage from tornadoes alone in the state amounted to $14.5 million. An F1 tornado killed one person after tossing a mobile home into the air and destroying it. Two other occupants sustained serious injuries. Another F1 tornado struck a mobile home park, destroying eleven homes, injuring seven people and leaving $2 million in damages. Six F2 tornadoes touched down in Mississippi. One of these tracked for nearly 18 miles (29 km) and grew to a width of 800 yd (730 m). The tornado caused $2.5 million in damage and injured three people after destroying one building and severely damaging several homes and farms. Throughout the state, 2,127 residences lost power due to high winds.

==== Elsewhere ====
Moving across Arkansas as a tropical depression, Rita dropped heavy rainfall in the state, reaching 5.98 in (152 mm) at Cane Creek State Park. There were 15 tornadoes across the state. Rita's passage left 60,000 people without power in Arkansas. Three F2 tornadoes touched down in the state, the first injured five people in Lonoke County, the second was a low-end F2 tornado that completely destroyed a double-wide mobile home. The third was rated as a high-end F2 with winds near 155 mph (249 km/h); it destroyed three structures and severely damaged several others. Throughout the state, winds gusted up to 50 mph (80 km/h), leaving 2,976 residences without power. Damage in Arkansas amounted to roughly $1 million.

Light rainfall occurred in neighboring Oklahoma, reaching 2.86 in (73 mm) at a station near Idabel. The outskirts of the storm produced rainfall that extended into Georgia and Tennessee.The outskirts of the storm produced rainfall that extended into Georgia and Tennessee.

As a tropical depression, Rita also moved through southeastern Missouri, producing wind gusts of 41 mph (66 km/h) at Cape Girardeau Regional Airport. The storm also dropped 3.23 in (82 mm) worth of precipitation in Hornersville. The storm's passage knocked down trees, including a few that fell onto power lines, leaving more than 5,400 people without electricity. The disorganized low associated with Rita moved through eastern Illinois before dissipating. The system dropped light rainfall, reaching 2.66 in (68 mm) in Lebanon. The rains were beneficial due to drought conditions. Light rainfall of 1 to 3 in (25 to 76 mm) occurred elsewhere throughout the Great Lakes and the Ohio Valley.

== Aftermath ==
On September 24, president George W. Bush declared a federal disaster area for all counties in Texas and all parishes in Louisiana. This included 22 counties and 24 parishes eligible for individual assistance. FEMA set up 8 Disaster Recovery Centers (DRCs) in southwest Louisiana and another 5 DRCs in Texas. By March 2006, FEMA had issued more than $900 million in housing assistance to victims of Hurricane Rita in Louisiana and Texas. The combined effect of Hurricanes Katrina and Rita was the destruction of an estimated 562 square kilometres (217 sq mi) of coastal wetlands in Louisiana.

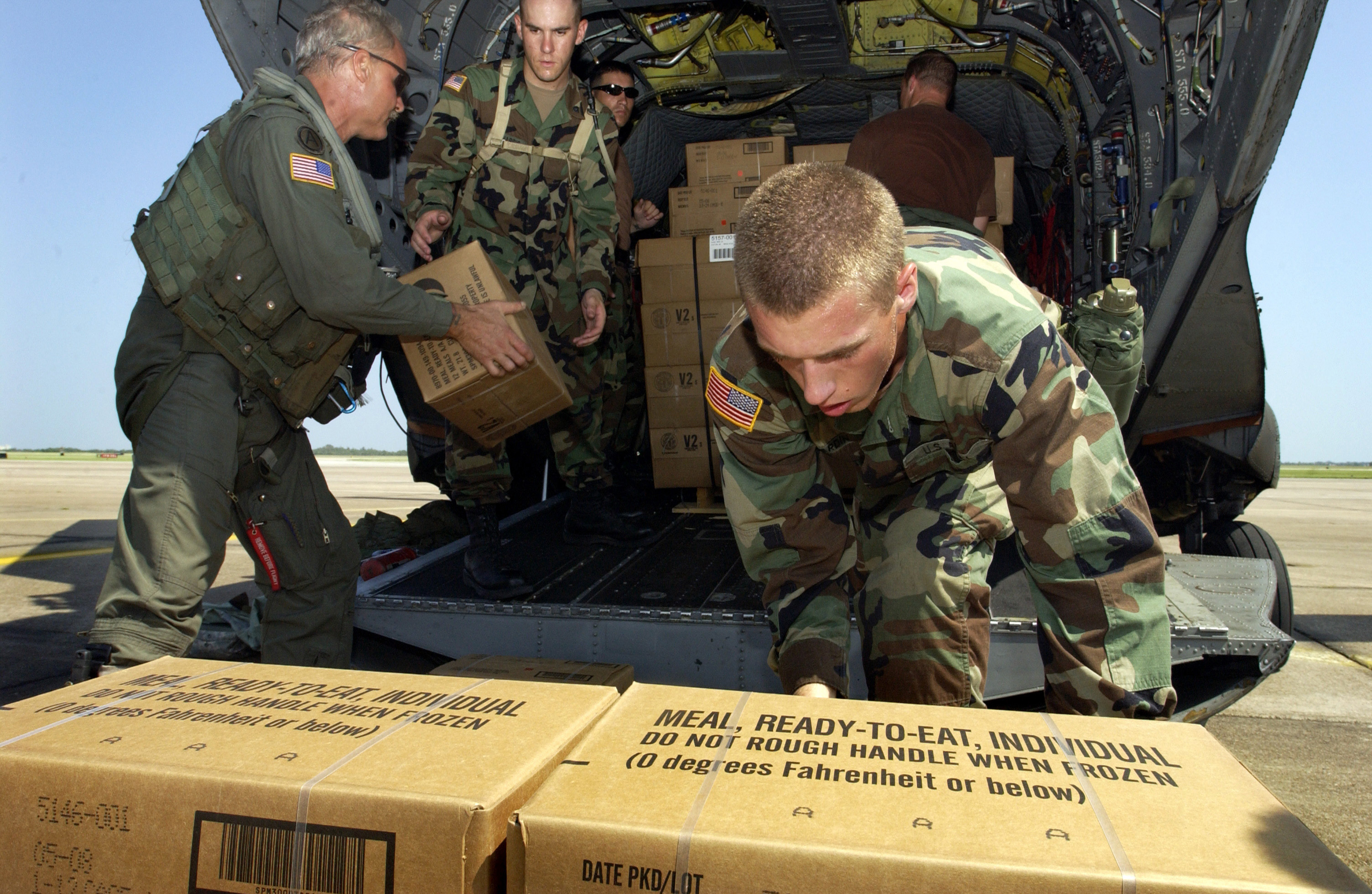
Soldiers load hundreds of Meals, Ready-to-Eat and water onto a CH-47 Chinook helicopter at Ellington Field, Texas

On September 24, 2005, following the havoc caused by Hurricanes Katrina and Rita, the National Guard named Brig. Gen. Douglas Pritt of the 41st Brigade Combat Team, Oregon Army National Guard, head of Joint Task Force Rita (formally called JTF Ponchartrain). The 1,400 Oregonian soldiers and airmen, including the 1st Battalion of the 186th Infantry which is designated a quick response unit, are joined by engineers and military police from Louisiana, the 56th Stryker brigade from Pennsylvania, and an engineering battalion from Missouri.

By September 28, The American Red Cross extended its financial assistance and housing programs to victims of Hurricane Rita. AmeriCorps also extended aid to victims of Rita, with more than 2900 members assisting with recovery on the gulf coast from Katrina and Rita.

In January 2006, contractors started repairing the damaged Lake Livingston Dam, at a cost of $9.6 million. FEMA provided 75% of the funds, and the other 25% came from the city of Houston. To restore the damaged riprap, 50 trucks each day hauled material to the site, and the restoration was finished on April 26, 2006.

Hurricane Rita contributed to a decline in populations in coastal areas of Louisiana. A 2007 survey found that Cameron Parish saw a 26% decline from its pre-storm population. By September 2025, 20 years after Rita, the parish still had not recovered to its pre-Rita population, in part due to additional damage from later hurricanes.

=== Retirement ===
Because of the widespread property destruction along the U.S. Gulf Coast, the name Rita was retired from the Atlantic hurricane naming lists in April 2006 by the World Meteorological Organization. The name will never again be used for another tropical cyclone in the Atlantic basin. It was replaced with Rina for the 2011 Atlantic hurricane season.

== See also ==
- Tropical cyclones in 2005
- List of Category 5 Atlantic hurricanes
- List of Florida hurricanes (2000–present)
- List of Texas hurricanes (1980-present)
- List of Louisiana hurricanes
- Hurricane Laura (2020) – A Category 4 hurricane that devastated similar areas
- Timeline of the 2005 Atlantic hurricane season
