= National Register of Historic Places listings in San Jacinto County, Texas =

Location of San Jacinto County in Texas

This is a list of the National Register of Historic Places listings in San Jacinto County, Texas.

This is intended to be a complete list of properties listed on the National Register of Historic Places in San Jacinto County, Texas. There are two properties listed on the National Register in the county. Both properties are also designated Recorded Texas Historic Landmarks.

This National Park Service list is complete through NPS recent listings posted March 21, 2025.

== Current listings ==
The locations of National Register properties may be seen in a mapping service provided.

	Name on the Register	Image	Date listed	Location	City or town	Description
1	San Jacinto County Courthouse	San Jacinto County Courthouse	May 1, 2003 (#03000332)	#1 TX 150 at Byrd Ave. 30°35′32″N 95°07′42″W	Coldspring	Recorded Texas Historic Landmark
2	San Jacinto County Jail	San Jacinto County Jail	July 15, 1980 (#80004148)	Slade and Loyd St. 30°35′46″N 95°07′42″W	Coldspring	Recorded Texas Historic Landmark

== See also ==
- National Register of Historic Places listings in Texas
- Recorded Texas Historic Landmarks in San Jacinto County
