= Old Waverly =

Old Waverly may refer to:

- Old Waverly Golf Club, in West Point, Mississippi
- Old Waverly, Texas, an unincorporated community in Walker County, Texas
