= Texas State Highway 156 =

State highway in Texas

State Highway 156
- SH 156 highlighted in red

Route information
- Maintained by TxDOT
- Length: 14.233 mi (22.906 km)
- Existed: 1930–present

Major junctions
- South end: SH 150 in Coldspring
- North end: US 190 in Point Blank

Location
- Country: United States
- State: Texas
- Counties: San Jacinto

Highway system
- Highways in Texas; Interstate; US; State; Former; Toll; Loops; Spurs; FM/RM; Park; Rec
← SH 155	→ SH 157

State Highway 156 (SH 156) is a short Texas state highway running between Coldspring and Point Blank. This route runs along the western side of Lake Livingston and mostly is within the Sam Houston National Forest. The route was designated on March 19, 1930 along its current route, replacing part of a branch of SH 45.

== Junction list ==
The entire highway is in San Jacinto County.

Location	mi	km	Destinations	Notes
Coldspring	0.0	0.0	SH 150 (Byrd Avenue) – Shepherd, New Waverly	
Sam Houston National Forest	1.0	1.6	FM 224 north – Wolf Creek Park	Southern terminus of FM 224
Sam Houston National Forest	1.4	2.3	FM 945 south	Northern terminus of FM 945
Sam Houston National Forest	5.2	8.4	FM 946 north – Oakhurst	Southern terminus of FM 946
Stephen Creek	8.9	14.3	FM 224 south – Wolf Creek Park	Northern terminus of FM 224
Point Blank	14.3	23.0	US 190 – Huntsville, Livingston	
1.000 mi = 1.609 km; 1.000 km = 0.621 mi
