= Old Waverly, Texas =

Unincorporated community in Texas, United States

Coordinates: 30°31′45″N 95°21′10″W

Waverly or Old Waverly is an unincorporated community in Walker County, Texas, United States. It is located at the intersection of Texas State Highway 150 and Farm to Market Road 1725. Its population was 200 as of 2000.

== History ==
James Winters settled in Waverly in 1835. By 1852, 300 people, including some slaves, were in the area. The town was incorporated in 1858. A post office operated there from 1855 to 1872. Around that same time, Methodist, Presbyterian, and Episcopalian churches were started in the town. The town diminished around 1870. By 1896, the population was up to 400, but dwindled to 100 by 1925. By the 1980s, all that was left of Waverly was a cemetery, a Presbyterian church, and a subdivision.

== Education ==
Old Waverly is served in part by the Coldspring-Oakhurst Consolidated Independent School District, with the New Waverly Independent School District splitting at Browder Loop & Prescott Drive.
