= Coldspring, Texas =

- City
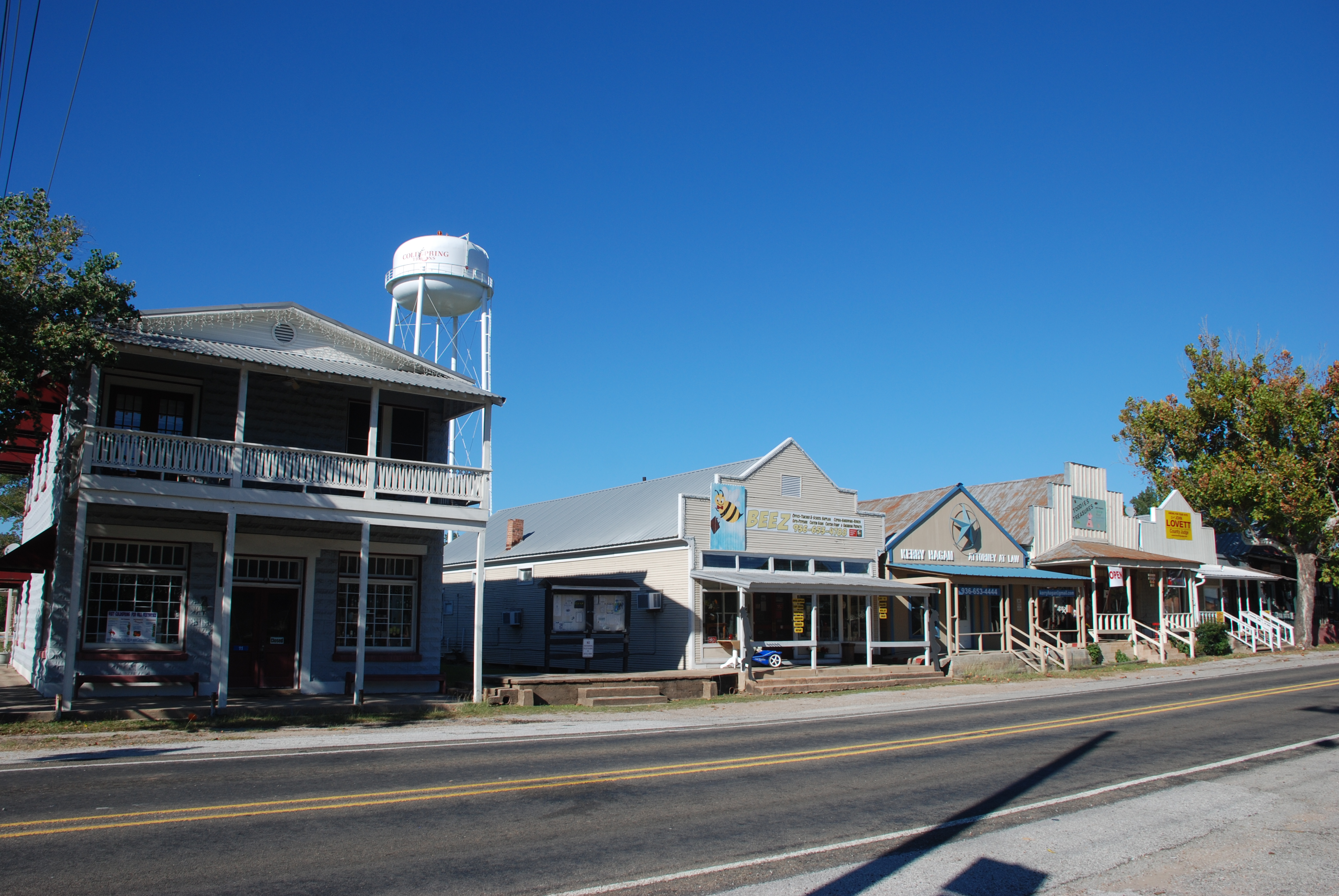
- Byrd Ave, Coldspring, Texas

- Location of Coldspring within San Jacinto County, Texas

- Location within Texas Location within the United States
- Coordinates: 30°35′17″N 95°8′0″W
- Country: United States
- State: Texas
- County: San Jacinto

Area
  - Total: 1.86 sq mi (4.82 km^{2})
  - Land: 1.86 sq mi (4.81 km^{2})
  - Water: 0.0039 sq mi (0.01 km^{2})
- Elevation: 360 ft (110 m)

Population (2020)
  - Total: 819
  - Density: 500/sq mi (194/km^{2})
- Time zone: UTC-6 (Central (CST))
  - Summer (DST): UTC-5 (CDT)
- ZIP code: 77331
- Area code: 936
- FIPS code: 48-15892
- GNIS feature ID: 1384227
- Website: https://cityofcoldspring.com/

Coldspring is a city in San Jacinto County, Texas, United States. It is the county seat of San Jacinto County, which is named after the river that traverses it and shares its name with the battle that gave Texas its independence. Its population was 819 at the 2020 census.

== History ==
The history of Coldspring is linked to Stephen F. Austin's first colony in Texas, which established, among other locales, San Jacinto County. Austin's original colony extended to the Trinity River watershed (roughly along Texas 156 toward Point Blank). After receiving a commission from the Mexican government to settle the town, Joseph Vehlein, a German immigrant to Mexico, deeded 640 acres (2.6 km^{2}) to Robert Rankin, an American Revolutionary officer. This acreage included the site of Coldspring.

The settlement of Cold Springs (old spelling) began around 1850. In 1848, the only building was a nearby trading post called "Coonskin" (later, "Fireman's Hill").

Coldspring had developed into a bustling county-seat town by 1915, but disaster struck on March 30, 1915, when the wooden courthouse burned, thus removing the economic foundation of the town. Plans for a new courthouse were made, and the present building was completed in 1918. The townspeople then moved their buildings to be closer to the new courthouse.

In 1983, San Jacinto County Sheriff James Cecil "Humpy" Parker was convicted of six civil rights abuses of suspects using the form of torture called waterboarding and was sentenced to 10 years in federal prison. However, he served fewer than five before his medical release due to brain cancer; he died in 1994. Parker's son and deputy, Gary, was convicted in 1984 of conspiracy to violate suspects' rights. These incidents were incorporated into a novel by Steven Sellers, Terror on Highway 59 in 1984, which in turn was made into a made-for-television movie, Terror on Highway 91 (1989), starring Ricky Schroder.

== Geography ==
Coldspring is located at 30°35′17″N 95°8′0″W (30.588194, –95.133262). Houston, the fifth-largest metropolitan center in the United States, is about 55 miles (89 km) to Coldspring's south.

According to the United States Census Bureau, the city has a total area of 1.8 square miles (4.7 km^{2}), all land.

== Demographics ==
Historical population
Census	Pop.	Note	%±
1890	439		—
1970	488		—
1980	569		16.6%
1990	538		−5.4%
2000	691		28.4%
2010	853		23.4%
2020	819		−4.0%
U.S. Decennial Census

=== 2020 census ===
As of the 2020 census, Coldspring had a population of 819. The median age was 39.0 years, 22.6% of residents were under 18, and 20.0% of residents were 65 or older. For every 100 females, there were 64.8 males, and for every 100 females 18 and over, there were 55.4 males 18 and over.

According to the 2020 census data, none of the residents lived in urban areas, while 100.0% lived in rural areas.

Of the 291 households in Coldspring, 34.0% had children under 18 living in them, 39.5% were married-couple households, 17.5% were households with a male householder and no spouse or partner present, and 39.2% were households with a female householder and no spouse or partner present. About 29.5% of all households were made up of individuals, and 15.4% had someone living alone who was 65 or older.

The 339 housing units had a 14.2% vacancy rate. Among occupied housing units, 62.2% were owner-occupied and 37.8% were renter-occupied. The homeowner vacancy rate was 6.0% and the rental vacancy rate was 6.8%.

Racial composition as of the 2020 census
Race	Number	Percent
White	526	64.2%
Black or African American	211	25.8%
American Indian and Alaska Native	4	0.5%
Asian	6	0.7%
Native Hawaiian and other Pacific Islander	1	0.1%
Some other race	19	2.3%
Two or more races	52	6.3%
Hispanic or Latino (of any race)	61	7.4%

=== 2000 census ===
As of the 2000 census, 691 people, 263 households, and 180 families were living in the city. The population density was 375 inhabitants per square mile (145/km^{2}). The 313 housing units averaged 170 per square mile (65.7/km^{2}). The racial makeup of the city was 66.28% White, 31.40% African American, 0.43% Native American, 0.58% Asian, and 1.30% from two or more races. Hispanics or Latinos of any race were 3.18% of the population.

Of the 263 households, 34.6% had children under 18 living with them, 44.1% were married couples living together, 20.5% had a female householder with no husband present, and 31.2% were not families. About 28.1% of all households were made up of individuals, and 12.5% had someone living alone who was 65 or older. The average household size was 2.44, and the average family size was 2.91.

In the city, the age distribution was 27.8% under 18, 10.6% from 18 to 24, 26.8% from 25 to 44, 20.1% from 45 to 64, and 14.8% who were 65 or older. The median age was 34 years. For every 100 females, there were 95.8 males. For every 100 females 18 and over, there were 86.9 males.

In the city, the median income for a household was $27,083 and for a family was $30,729. Males had a median income of $31,667 versus $23,750 for females. The per capita income for the city was $16,777. About 19.7% of families and 19.6% of the population were below the poverty line, including 18.9% of those under 18 and 13.6% of those 65 or over.

== Culture ==
The town square hosts antique stores, art studios, and restaurants. More than 35 historical markers are placed throughout the town. Also of historical significance are the Historic Heritage Center, Old Town Coldspring, the 1887 Jail Museum, and the oldest continuously active Methodist Church in Texas, which had been established in 1848.

About 25 golf courses are within a 50-mile (80 km) radius of Coldspring. Nearby, Lake Livingston and Sam Houston National Forest's Double Lake Recreational Area offer opportunities for camping, hiking, fishing, and water skiing.

== Education ==
The City of Coldspring is served by the Coldspring-Oakhurst Consolidated Independent School District.
