= Lake Livingston =

Reservoir in eastern Texas, United States

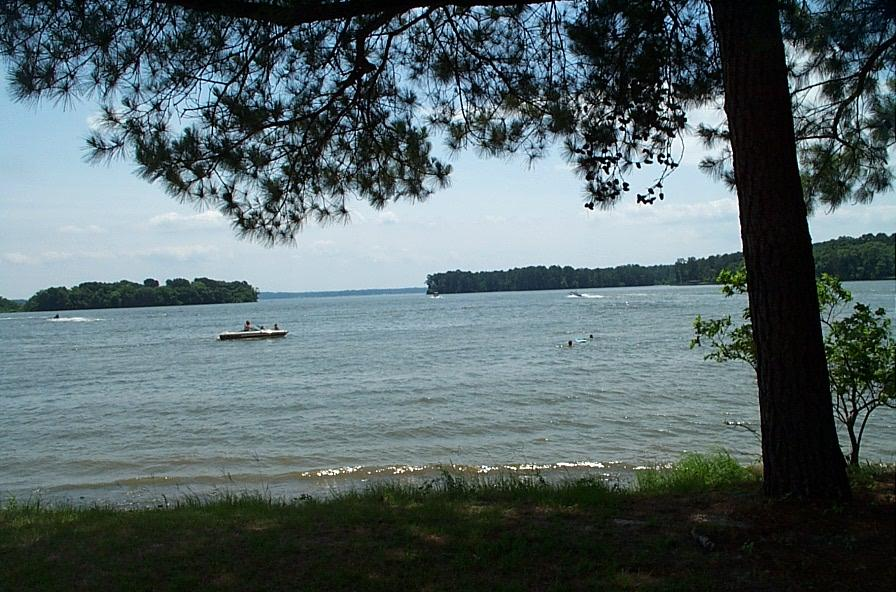

- Location within Texas Location within the United States
- Location: Houston, Madison, Polk, San Jacinto, Trinity and Walker counties in Texas
- Coordinates: 30°44′N 95°09′W
- Type: reservoir
- Primary inflows: Trinity River
- Primary outflows: Trinity River
- Catchment area: 16,616 sq mi (43,040 km^{2})
- Basin countries: United States
- Max. length: 31 mi (50 km)
- Max. width: 9 mi (14 km)
- Surface area: 130 sq mi (336 km^{2})
- Average depth: 23 ft (7.0 m)
- Max. depth: 90 ft (27 m)
- Water volume: 1,750,000 acre⋅ft (2.16 km^{3})
- Shore length^{1}: over 450 mi (720 km)
- Surface elevation: 131 ft (40 m)
- Islands: Alligator Island; Pine Island
- Settlements: Trinity; Onalaska; Point Blank; Riverside; Sebastopol
- ^{1} Shore length is not a well-defined measure.

Lake Livingston is a reservoir located in Piney Woods in Houston, Madison, Polk, San Jacinto, Trinity, and Walker Counties in East Texas, United States. Lake Livingston was built and is owned and operated by the Trinity River Authority (TRA) of Texas under contract with the City of Houston for water-supply purposes. The USCG Auxiliary Flotilla 6-9 is also stationed on the lake. The lake is the third-largest lake located in Texas (only the Sam Rayburn Reservoir and Toledo Bend Reservoir are larger). The Livingston Dam, constructed across the Trinity River about 7 miles (11 km) southwest of the city of Livingston is 2.5 miles (4 km) long and has an average depth of 55 feet (17 m).

== Construction ==
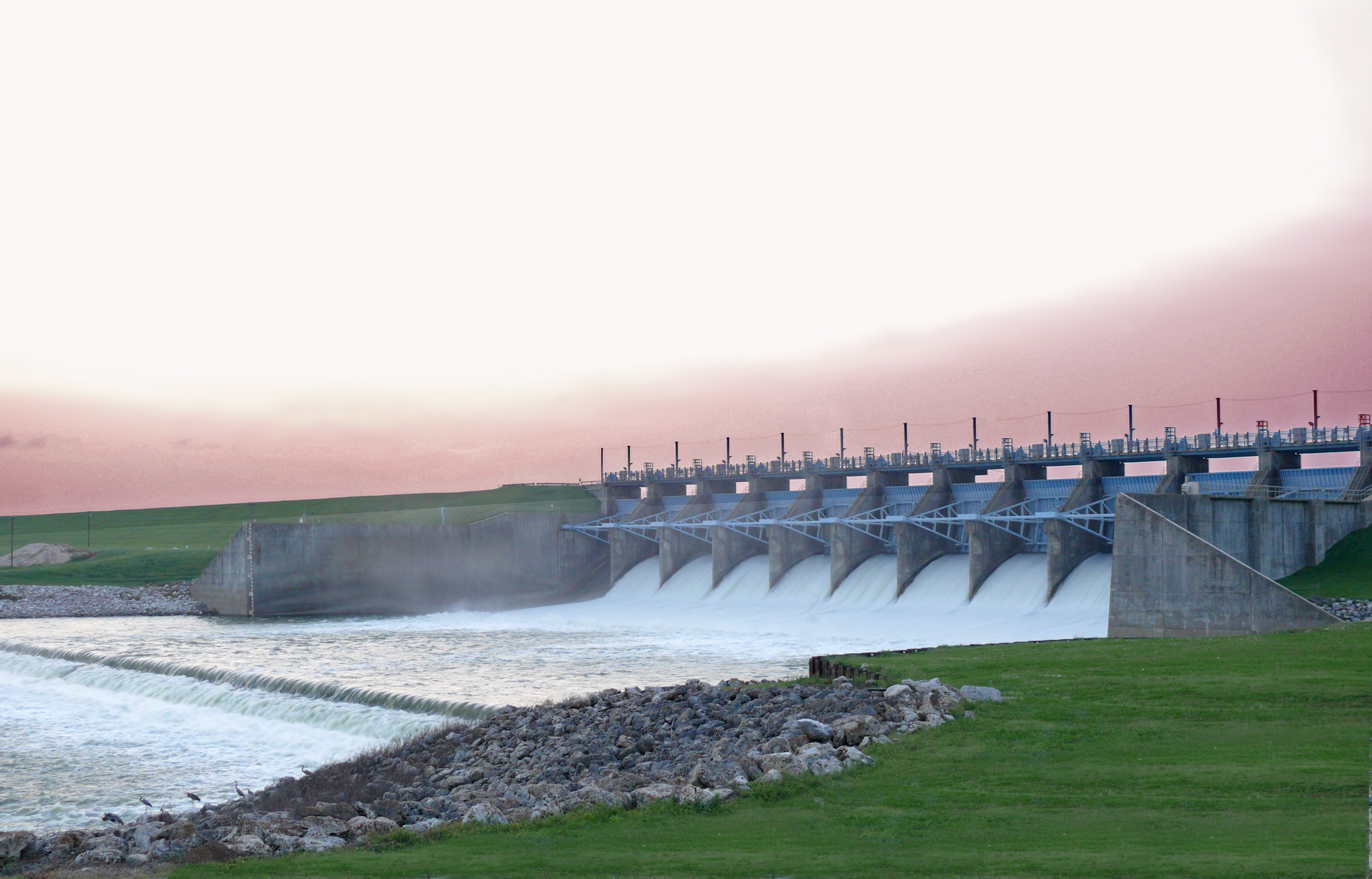
Downstream side of Lake Livingston Dam near sundown

The lake's construction was paid for by the sale of revenue bonds, to be redeemed with income from the sale of water. The dam construction began in 1966 and was completed in 1969 by Forrest and Cotton, Incorporated. The cost to build the earthen dam was US$83,996,957 ($721,267,181 in 2023 dollars).

In January 2026, The Washington Post reported that the National Inventory of Dams listed the condition of the dam as "unsatisfactory".

== Use ==
Water stored in the lake supplies industrial, municipal, and agricultural needs in the lower Trinity River Basin and the Houston/Galveston metropolitan area. Its significance in the face of the extraordinary growth experienced by this region of the upper Texas Gulf Coast is tremendous. Many public and commercial recreation facilities, including full-service marinas, camping, and motel accommodations, are located along the shoreline. The City of Houston owns two-thirds of the lake's water rights, with the remaining third under the control of the TRA.

Lake Livingston provides numerous opportunities for fishing, particularly white bass and catfish. Specifics are available from Texas Parks and Wildlife.

== Hydroelectric power ==
In 2021, the East Texas Electric Cooperative, the TRA, and the City of Houston officially dedicated the R.C. Thomas Hydroelectric Project, which generates electricity using the power of water flowing from Lake Livingston to the Trinity River below the dam. According to the Sam Houston Electric Cooperative, the project generates enough clean energy to serve about 12,000 households in East Texas and has the potential to offset roughly 64,000 tons of carbon dioxide emissions from fossil-fuel power-generating plants each year.

== The lake ==
The earthfill dam has a concrete spillway and was designed by Brown and Root, Incorporated (now KBR, Inc). The dam has a spillway crest elevation of 99 feet (30 m) above mean sea level. The average base width of the dam's earthen embankment is 310 feet (94 m) wide. The spillway is designed and constructed to pass flows of three times the maximum recorded flow of the river at this site.

Lake Livingston has a surface area of 83,000 acres (360 km^{2}) and impounds 1,750,000 acre-feet (2.16 km^{3}) of water at its normal pool elevation of 131 feet (40 m) above mean sea level. The average depth of the lake is 23 feet (7 m) with a maximum depth of 90 feet (27 m). Lake Livingston has more than 450 miles (700 km) of shoreline extending into San Jacinto, Polk, Walker, and Trinity Counties.

== Flood control ==
Lake Livingston was built with no flood control or flood-storage capabilities, and because of this, all water entering the lake, whether from rainfall or inflow, must exit as intake increases. Flow through the dam is controlled by 12 tainter gates in a concrete-and-steel spillway with an average depth of 55 feet (17 m). Operations of the spillway mirror river flow, so within a relatively short period of time, an increase in river flow results in increased discharge, and vice versa.

== Hurricane Rita ==
On September 23, 2005, rain and winds from Hurricane Rita caused waves up to 4 feet (1.2 m) in height to pound against the Lake Livingston dam. As a result, 11,000 feet (3.4 km) of large protective stones, or riprap, were stripped from the upstream face of the dam. To repair the damage, the TRA lowered the lake's pool level by 4 feet (1.2 m) to 127 feet (39 m), preventing any further erosion of the exposed earthen embankment. The Federal Emergency Management Agency and the City of Houston covered the $9.6 million repair bill and awarded the contract to Archer Western Contractors. Over the course of the repair, 72,215 tons of 32-inch rock in 3,183 truckloads and 15,808 tons of 8-inch (200 mm) bedding rock in 687 truckloads were moved. The rock was mined from a quarry in Navarro County near Corsicana. Work was largely completed by April 28, 2006, but due to severe drought, the lake's regular pool level was not reached until November, 2006.

During the 2017 Hurricane Harvey, Lake Livingston reached a level of 133.52 feet (40.70 m) above mean sea level and released 110,600 cu ft (3,130 m^{3}) of water per second.

== Entertainment references ==
Joe McKinney and Michael McCarty's "Lost Girl of the Lake" is a 2012 Bram Stoker Award Finalist from the Horror Writers Association, that takes place at Lake Livingston in the 1960s. Lake Livingston was featured on the third episode of the first season of the television show River Monsters, which airs on Animal Planet. The host, Jeremy Wade, was searching for alligator gar.

== See also ==
- List of dams and reservoirs in Texas
