= San Jacinto County, Texas =

County in Texas, United States

- County
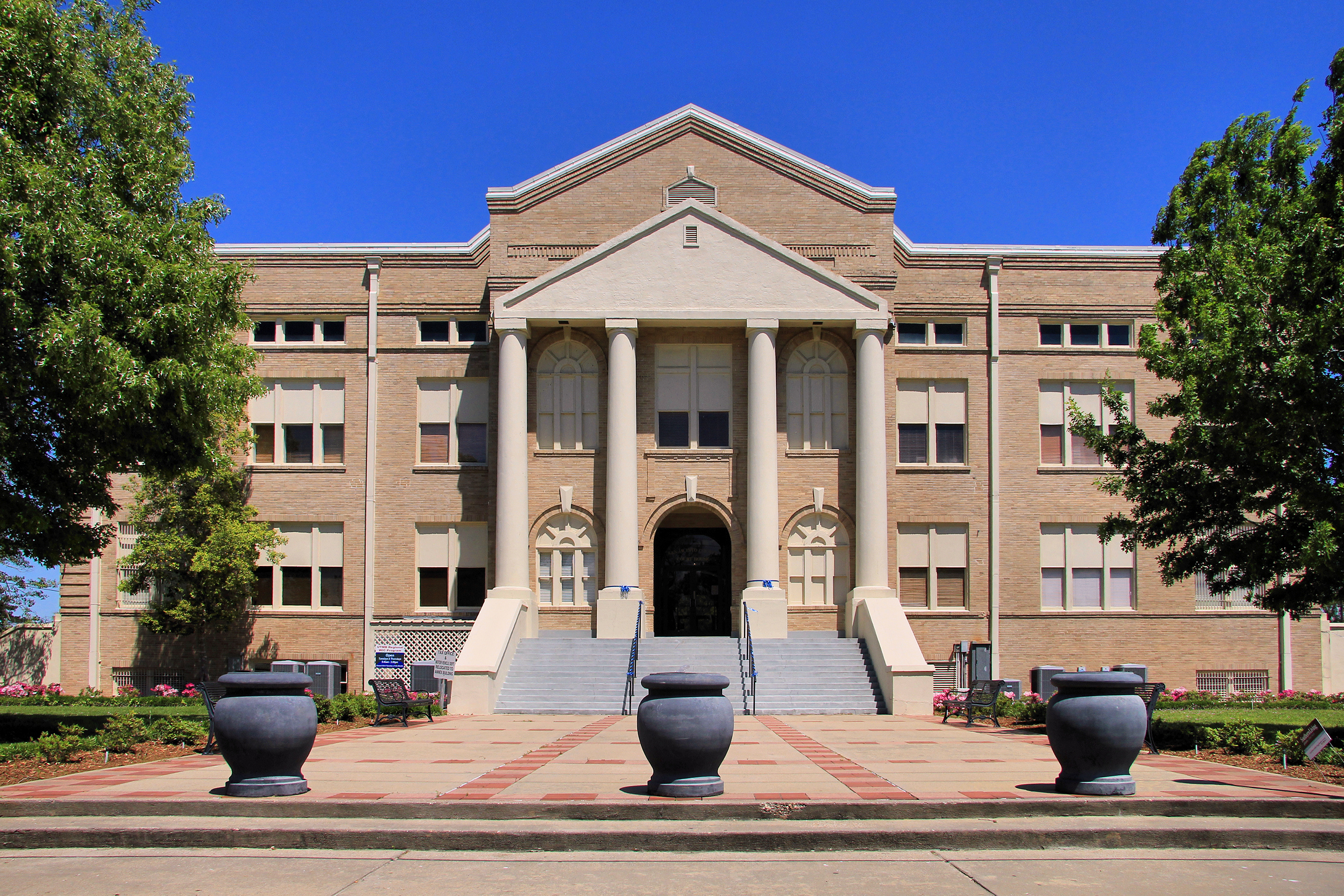
- The San Jacinto County Courthouse in Coldspring

- Location within the U.S. state of Texas
- Coordinates: 30°35′N 95°10′W
- Country: United States
- State: Texas
- Founded: 1870
- Named for: Battle of San Jacinto
- Seat: Coldspring
- Largest city: Shepherd

Area
  - Total: 628 sq mi (1,630 km^{2})
  - Land: 569 sq mi (1,470 km^{2})
  - Water: 59 sq mi (150 km^{2}) 9.3%

Population (2020)
  - Total: 27,402
  - Estimate (2025): 29,488 ▲
  - Density: 48.2/sq mi (18.6/km^{2})
- Time zone: UTC−6 (Central)
  - Summer (DST): UTC−5 (CDT)
- Congressional district: 8th
- Website: www.co.san-jacinto.tx.us

San Jacinto County (/ˌsæn dʒəˈsɪntoʊ/ SAN jə-SIN-toh) is a county in the U.S. state of Texas. As of the 2020 census, its population was 27,402. Its county seat is Coldspring. The county's name comes from the Battle of San Jacinto, which secured Texas' independence from Mexico and established a republic in 1836.

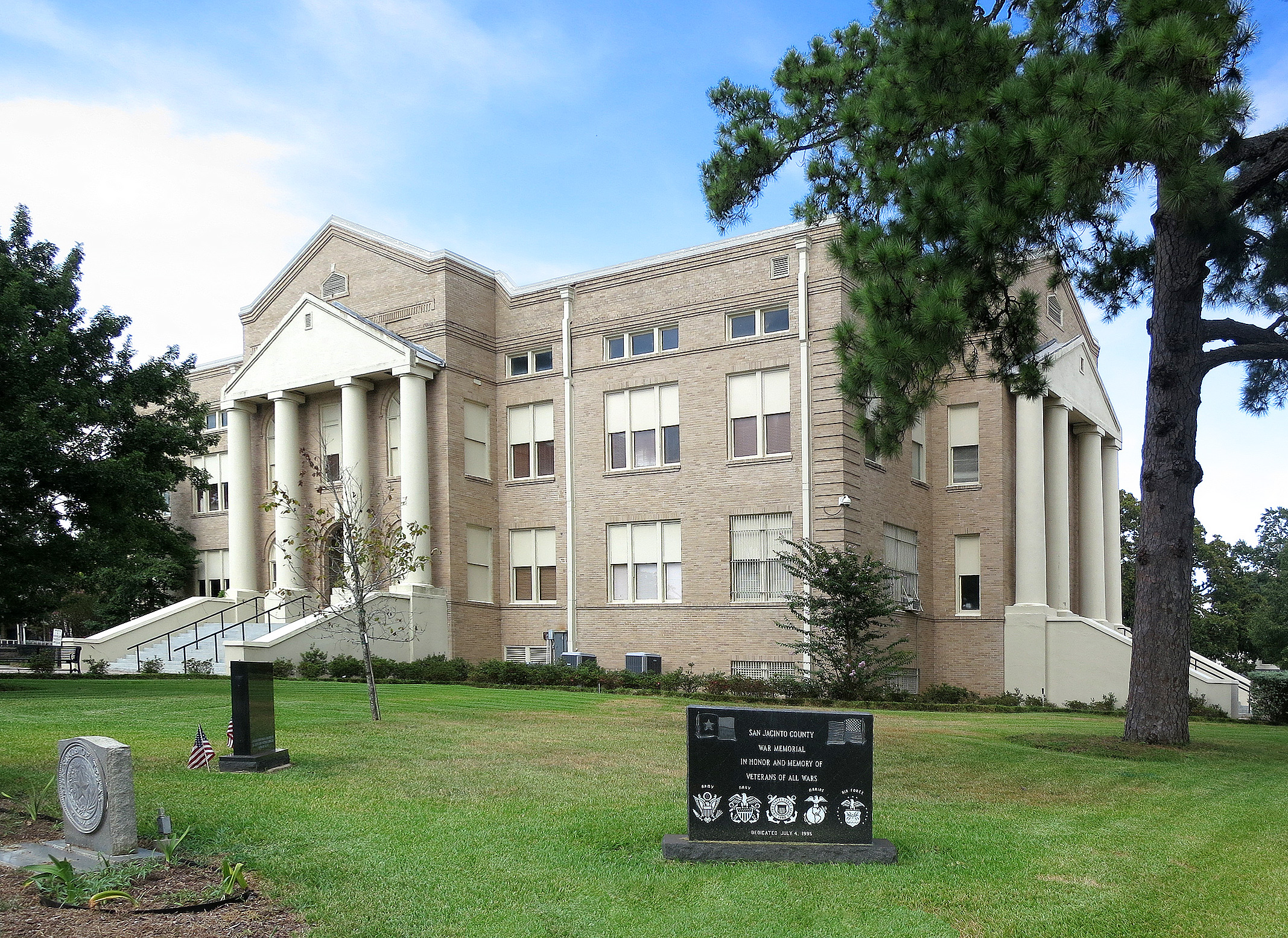
San Jacinto County Courthouse, located in Coldspring

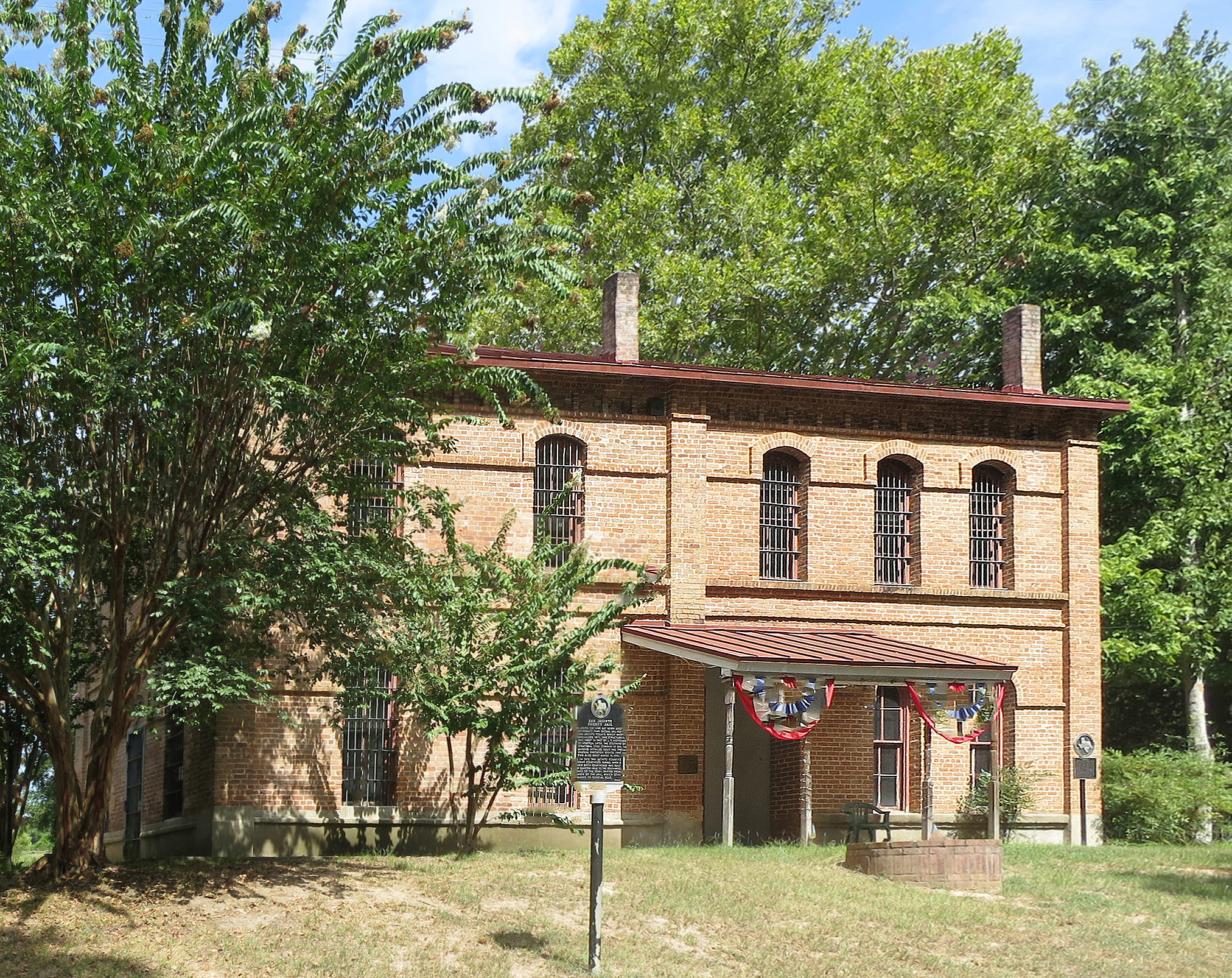
Old San Jacinto County Jail

== Geography ==
According to the U.S. Census Bureau, the county has a total area of 628 square miles (1,630 km^{2}), of which 569 square miles (1,470 km^{2}) are land and 59 square miles (150 km^{2}) (9.3%) are covered by water.

=== Major highways ===
- U.S. Highway 59
  - Interstate 69 is currently under construction and will follow the current route of U.S. 59 in most places.
- U.S. Highway 190
- State Highway 105
- State Highway 150
- State Highway 156
- Loop 424

The TTC-69 component (recommended preferred) of the once-planned Trans-Texas Corridor went through San Jacinto County.

=== Adjacent counties ===
- Trinity County (north)
- Polk County (east)
- Liberty County (southeast)
- Montgomery County (southwest)
- Walker County (west)

=== National protected area ===
- Sam Houston National Forest (part)

== Demographics ==
Historical population
Census	Pop.	Note	%±
1880	6,186		—
1890	7,360		19.0%
1900	10,277		39.6%
1910	9,542		−7.2%
1920	9,867		3.4%
1930	9,711		−1.6%
1940	9,056		−6.7%
1950	7,172		−20.8%
1960	6,153		−14.2%
1970	6,702		8.9%
1980	11,434		70.6%
1990	16,372		43.2%
2000	22,246		35.9%
2010	26,384		18.6%
2020	27,402		3.9%
2025 (est.)	29,488	▲	7.6%
U.S. Decennial Census; 1850–2010 2010 2020

=== Racial and ethnic composition ===
San Jacinto County, Texas – Racial and ethnic composition Note: the US Census treats Hispanic/Latino as an ethnic category. This table excludes Latinos from the racial categories and assigns them to a separate category. Hispanics/Latinos may be of any race.
Race / Ethnicity (NH = Non-Hispanic)	Pop 1980	Pop 1990	Pop 2000	Pop 2010	Pop 2020	% 1980	% 1990	% 2000	% 2010	% 2020
White alone (NH)	8,883	13,319	17,972	20,204	19,170	77.69%	81.35%	80.79%	76.58%	69.96%
Black or African American alone (NH)	2,391	2,534	2,796	2,662	2,083	20.91%	15.48%	12.57%	10.09%	7.60%
Native American or Alaska Native alone (NH)	41	71	81	120	123	0.36%	0.43%	0.36%	0.45%	0.45%
Asian alone (NH)	5	14	63	120	86	0.04%	0.09%	0.28%	0.45%	0.31%
Native Hawaiian or Pacific Islander alone (NH)	x	x	15	9	15	x	x	0.07%	0.03%	0.05%
Other race alone (NH)	3	3	11	12	74	0.03%	0.02%	0.05%	0.05%	0.27%
Mixed race or Multiracial (NH)	x	x	224	377	1,029	x	x	1.01%	1.43%	3.76%
Hispanic or Latino (any race)	111	431	1,084	2,880	4,822	0.97%	2.63%	4.87%	10.92%	17.60%
Total	11,434	16,372	22,246	26,384	27,402	100.00%	100.00%	100.00%	100.00%	100.00%

=== 2020 census ===
As of the 2020 census, the county had a population of 27,402. The median age was 44.9 years; 21.7% of residents were under the age of 18 and 21.6% of residents were 65 years of age or older. For every 100 females there were 100.9 males, and for every 100 females age 18 and over there were 99.3 males.

The racial makeup of the county was 74.0% White, 7.8% Black or African American, 0.8% American Indian and Alaska Native, 0.3% Asian, 0.1% Native Hawaiian and Pacific Islander, 8.2% from some other race, and 8.8% from two or more races. Hispanic or Latino residents of any race comprised 17.6% of the population.

Less than 0.1% of residents lived in urban areas, while 100.0% lived in rural areas.

There were 10,546 households in the county, of which 28.0% had children under the age of 18 living in them. Of all households, 51.4% were married-couple households, 20.1% were households with a male householder and no spouse or partner present, and 23.0% were households with a female householder and no spouse or partner present. About 25.8% of all households were made up of individuals and 13.0% had someone living alone who was 65 years of age or older.

There were 13,778 housing units, of which 23.5% were vacant. Among occupied housing units, 84.4% were owner-occupied and 15.6% were renter-occupied. The homeowner vacancy rate was 2.8% and the rental vacancy rate was 10.5%.

=== 2000 census ===
As of the census of 2000, there were 22,246 people, 8,651 households, and 6,401 families residing in the county. The population density was 39 people per square mile (15 people/km^{2}). There were 11,520 housing units at an average density of 20 units per square mile (7.7/km^{2}). The racial makeup of the county was 83.64% White, 12.64% Black or African American, 0.46% Native American, 0.28% Asian, 0.07% Pacific Islander, 1.63% from other races, and 1.28% from two or more races. 4.87% of the population were Hispanic or Latino of any race.

There were 8,651 households, out of which 30.00% had children under the age of 18 living with them, 60.20% were married couples living together, 9.70% had a female householder with no husband present, and 26.00% were non-families. 22.60% of all households were made up of individuals, and 10.10% had someone living alone who was 65 years of age or older. The average household size was 2.55 and the average family size was 2.98.

In the county, the population was spread out, with 25.20% under the age of 18, 7.40% from 18 to 24, 24.90% from 25 to 44, 26.60% from 45 to 64, and 15.90% who were 65 years of age or older. The median age was 40 years. For every 100 females there were 100.50 males. For every 100 females age 18 and over, there were 97.40 males.

The median income for a household in the county was $32,220, and the median income for a family was $37,781. Males had a median income of $34,614 versus $22,313 for females. The per capita income for the county was $16,144. About 15.10% of families and 18.80% of the population were below the poverty line, including 22.80% of those under age 18 and 17.60% of those age 65 or over.

== Politics ==
=== United States Congress ===
Senators	Name	Party	First Elected	Level
Senate Class 1	Ted Cruz	Republican	2012	Junior Senator
Senate Class 2	John Cornyn	Republican	2002	Senior Senator
Representatives	Name	Party	First Elected	Area(s) of San Jacinto County Represented
District 8	Morgan Luttrell	Republican	2023	Entire county

United States presidential election results for San Jacinto County, Texas
Year	Republican		Democratic		Third party(ies)	
Year	No.	%	No.	%	No.	%
1912	196	30.39%	377	58.45%	72	11.16%
1916	255	36.48%	442	63.23%	2	0.29%
1920	7	1.01%	320	46.31%	364	52.68%
1924	104	14.86%	585	83.57%	11	1.57%
1928	296	37.00%	503	62.88%	1	0.13%
1932	16	1.89%	828	97.64%	4	0.47%
1936	67	10.62%	564	89.38%	0	0.00%
1940	119	13.46%	764	86.43%	1	0.11%
1944	53	7.36%	522	72.50%	145	20.14%
1948	106	13.70%	509	65.76%	159	20.54%
1952	494	32.06%	1,043	67.68%	4	0.26%
1956	565	42.51%	755	56.81%	9	0.68%
1960	448	28.54%	1,115	71.02%	7	0.45%
1964	343	16.93%	1,680	82.92%	3	0.15%
1968	381	16.50%	1,235	53.49%	693	30.01%
1972	1,296	55.81%	1,020	43.93%	6	0.26%
1976	1,094	31.00%	2,406	68.18%	29	0.82%
1980	1,726	41.16%	2,376	56.67%	91	2.17%
1984	3,174	56.09%	2,466	43.58%	19	0.34%
1988	2,691	47.31%	2,972	52.25%	25	0.44%
1992	2,494	35.57%	2,846	40.59%	1,671	23.83%
1996	2,878	44.38%	2,771	42.73%	836	12.89%
2000	4,623	59.93%	2,946	38.19%	145	1.88%
2004	5,394	66.39%	2,688	33.08%	43	0.53%
2008	6,151	68.66%	2,721	30.38%	86	0.96%
2012	7,107	73.91%	2,410	25.06%	99	1.03%
2016	8,059	77.92%	2,038	19.70%	246	2.38%
2020	10,161	80.39%	2,337	18.49%	142	1.12%
2024	10,524	82.29%	2,175	17.01%	90	0.70%

United States Senate election results for San Jacinto County, Texas1
Year	Republican		Democratic		Third party(ies)	
Year	No.	%	No.	%	No.	%
2024	10,118	79.61%	2,338	18.39%	254	2.00%

United States Senate election results for San Jacinto County, Texas2
Year	Republican		Democratic		Third party(ies)	
Year	No.	%	No.	%	No.	%
2020	9,808	79.33%	2,268	18.35%	287	2.32%
2026	7,666	73.66%	2,477	23.80%	264	2.54%

Texas Gubernatorial election results for San Jacinto County
Year	Republican		Democratic		Third party(ies)	
Year	No.	%	No.	%	No.	%
2022	7,882	82.54%	1,540	16.13%	127	1.33%
2026	7,887	75.80%	2,354	22.62%	164	1.58%

=== Texas Legislature ===
==== Texas Senate ====
District 3: Robert Nichols (R) – first elected in 2006.

==== Texas House of Representatives ====
District 18: Ernest Bailes (R) – first elected in 2016

== Education ==
School districts include

- Coldspring-Oakhurst Consolidated Independent School District
- Shepherd Independent School District
- Cleveland Independent School District (partial)
- Willis Independent School District (partial)

Areas of San Jacinto County in Coldspring-Oakhurst CISD and Shepherd ISD are assigned to Angelina College. Areas in Cleveland ISD and Willis ISD are assigned to Lone Star College.

== Communities ==
=== Cities ===
- Cleveland (mostly in Liberty County)
- Coldspring (county seat)
- Point Blank
- Shepherd

=== Census-designated places ===
- Cape Royale
- Oakhurst

== See also ==
- List of museums in the Texas Gulf Coast
- National Register of Historic Places listings in San Jacinto County, Texas
- Recorded Texas Historic Landmarks in San Jacinto County
- Pine Island (Lake Livingston)
