= Point Blank, Texas =

- City
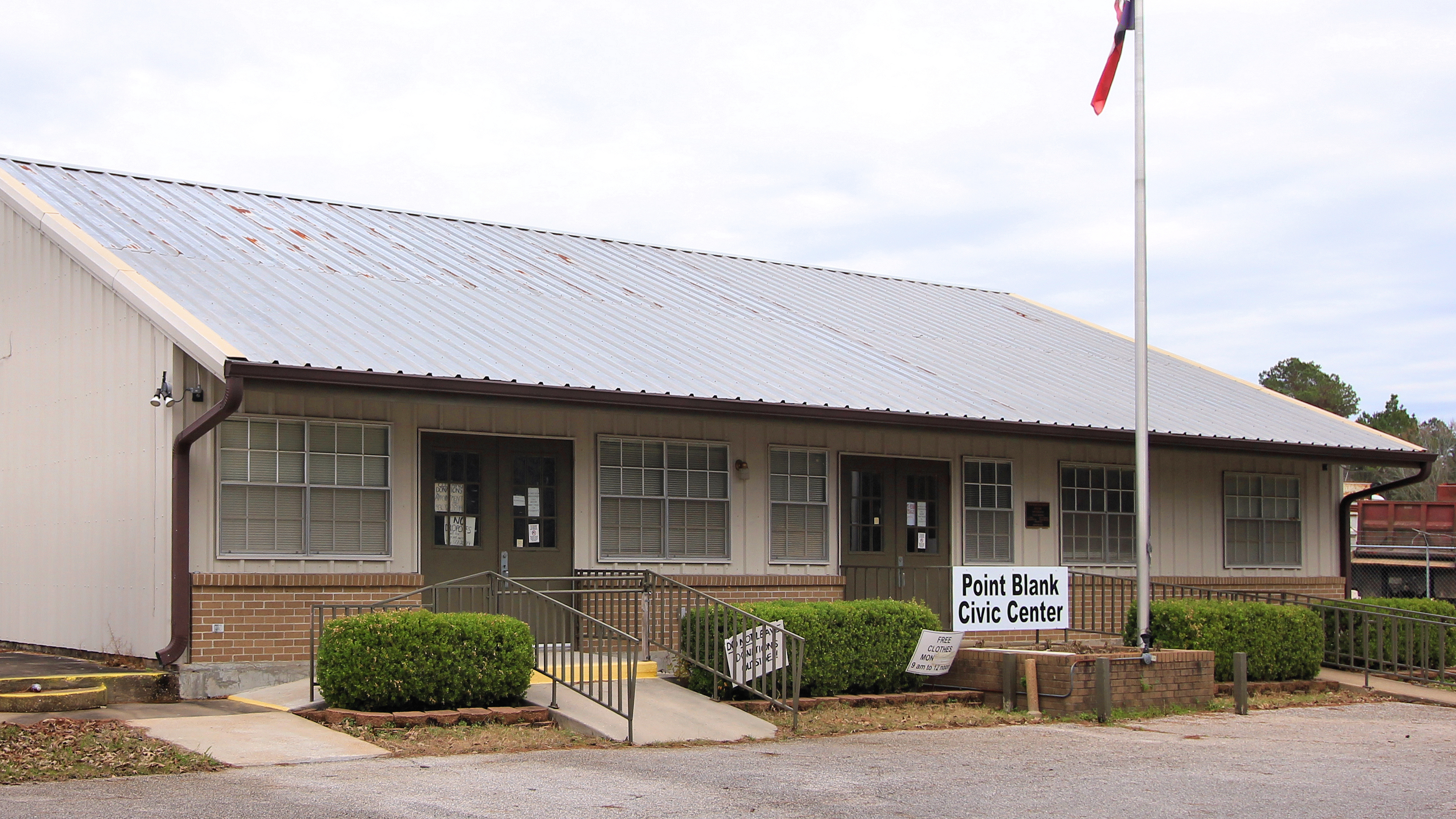
- Point Blank Civic Center

- Location of Point Blank within San Jacinto County, Texas

- Location within Texas Location within the United States
- Coordinates: 30°44′50″N 95°12′40″W
- Country: United States
- State: Texas
- County: San Jacinto

Area
  - Total: 2.08 sq mi (5.40 km^{2})
  - Land: 2.02 sq mi (5.24 km^{2})
  - Water: 0.062 sq mi (0.16 km^{2})

Population (2020)
  - Total: 643
  - Density: 371.7/sq mi (143.53/km^{2})
- Time zone: UTC-6 (Central (CST))
  - Summer (DST): UTC-5 (CDT)
- ZIP code: 77364
- Area code: 936
- FIPS code: 48-58556

Point Blank is a city in San Jacinto County, Texas, United States. Its population was 643 at the 2020 census.

== History ==
Florence Dissiway, a French woman from Alabama, who worked as a governess for a local family, gave the community the name Blanc Point c. 1850, which was later changed to Point Blank.

== Geography ==
Point Blank is located at 30°44′50″N 95°12′40″W (30.747241, –95.211138) along the banks of Lake Livingston.

According to the United States Census Bureau, the city has a total area of 2.2 square miles (5.7 km^{2}), of which 0.3 sq mi (0.78 km^{2}) (13.7%) is covered by water.

== Demographics ==
Historical population
| Census | Pop. | Note | %± |
|---|---|---|---|
| 1980 | 325 | | — |
| 1990 | 443 | | 36.3% |
| 2000 | 559 | | 26.2% |
| 2010 | 688 | | 23.1% |
| 2020 | 643 | | −6.5% |
U.S. Decennial Census

=== 2020 census ===
As of the 2020 census, Point Blank had a population of 643 and a median age of 57.2 years; 12.1% of residents were under 18 and 31.4% were 65 or older. For every 100 females, there were 103.5 males, and for every 100 females 18 and over, there were 100.4 males 18 and over.

Of the 305 households in Point Blank, 19.3% had children under 18 living in them, 48.9% were married-couple households, 23.3% were households with a male householder and no spouse or partner present, and 22.6% were households with a female householder and no spouse or partner present. About 29.5% of all households were made up of individuals, and 14.8% had someone living alone who was 65 or older.

The 461 housing units had a 33.8% vacancy rate. The homeowner vacancy rate was 4.2% and the rental vacancy rate was 0.0%.

None of the residents lived in urban areas, while 100.0% lived in rural areas.

Racial composition as of the 2020 census
| Race | Number | Percent |
|---|---|---|
| White | 515 | 80.1% |
| Black or African American | 61 | 9.5% |
| American Indian and Alaska Native | 4 | 0.6% |
| Asian | 2 | 0.3% |
| Native Hawaiian and other Pacific Islander | 0 | 0.0% |
| Some other race | 12 | 1.9% |
| Two or more races | 49 | 7.6% |
| Hispanic or Latino (of any race) | 29 | 4.5% |

=== 2000 census ===
As of the 2000 census, 559 people, 267 households, and 181 families were residing in the city. The population density was 296.9 inhabitants per square mile (114.6/km^{2}). The 403 housing units had an average density of 214.1 per square mile (82.7/km^{2}). The racial makeup of the city was 82.47% White, 13.95% African American, 0.54% Native American, 0.36% Asian, 1.07% from other races, and 1.61% from two or more races. Hispanics or Latinos of any race were 3.76% of the population.

Of the 267 households, 13.5% had children under 18 living with them, 58.1% were married couples living together, 6.0% had a female householder with no husband present, and 32.2% were not families. About 25.8% of all households were made up of individuals, and 12.0% had someone living alone who was 65 or older. The average household size was 2.09, and the average family size was 2.48.

In the city, the age distribution was 13.8% under 18, 5.0% from 18 to 24, 17.7% from 25 to 44, 32.9% from 45 to 64, and 30.6% who were 65 or older. The median age was 56 years. For every 100 females, there were 94.8 males. For every 100 females 18 and over, there were 95.1 males.

The median income in the city for a household was $31,875 and for a family was $38,036. Males had a median income of $39,000 versus $23,125 for females. The per capita income for the city was $21,804. About 10.3% of families and 18.3% of the population were below the poverty line, including 40.0% of those under 18 and 22.9% of those 65 or over.

== Education ==
The city is served by the Coldspring-Oakhurst Consolidated Independent School District.

== Notable person ==
George Tyler Wood, second governor of Texas
