= List of Recorded Texas Historic Landmarks (Sabine-Travis) =

The following is a partial list of Recorded Texas Historic Landmarks (RTHLs) arranged by county as designated by the Texas Historical Commission and local county historical commissions in Texas. This page includes RTHLs in the following counties: Sabine, San Augustine, San Jacinto, San Patricio, San Saba, Schleicher, Scurry, Shackelford, Shelby, Sherman, Smith, Somervell, Starr, Stephens, Sterling, Stonewall, Sutton, Swisher, Tarrant, Taylor, Terrell, Terry, Throckmorton, Titus, Tom Green, and Travis.

Recorded Texas Historic Landmarks listed by county
Anderson-Callahan • Cameron-Duval • Eastland-Gray • Grayson-Hudspeth • Hunt-Martin • Mason-Rusk • Sabine-Travis • Trinity-Zavala

KEY

Landmarks with multiple historic designations are colored according to their highest designation within the following hierarchy.

⁕ Listed individually on the National Register of Historic Places (NRHP) as a National Historic Landmark
⁂ Listed on the NRHP as a contributing property of a National Historic Landmark District
† Listed individually on the NRHP
‡ Listed as a contributing property of an NRHP Historic District
§ Listed individually as or as part of a State Historic Site
# Listed individually as or as part of a State Antiquities Landmark

== Sabine County ==
Registered Texas Historic Landmark	Image	Marker number	Physical address	Nearest city	Year designated	Location description
C. A. Nethery & Sons General Merchandise		15813	SH 21 W of SH 87 31°25′56″N 93°50′58″W	Milam	2009	
Cedar Grove Baptist Church		17881	3675 Cedar Grove Rd. 31°29′10″N 93°48′3″W	Milam	2014	
Clark-James House		17568	377 Bowie Trl. 31°12′47″N 93°45′43″W	Hemphill	2013	
Goodrich, William F. and Bertha Sutor, House		14533		Hemphill	2003	
Harper Chapel Church		13791	Harpers Chapel Dr. at FM 83 31°22′44″N 93°43′0″W	Hemphill	2005	8 mi. E on FM 83 to Harper Chapel Drive on left
Sabine County Jail		7578	SW corner courthouse square at 201 Main St. 31°20′31″N 93°50′59″W	Hemphill	1981	SH 87

== San Augustine County ==
Registered Texas Historic Landmark	Image	Marker number	Physical address	Nearest city	Year designated	Location description
Anderson House‡		7585	End of N. Congress St. 31°31′57″N 94°6′29″W	San Augustine	1962	
Augus Theatre‡		12176	110 E. Columbia St. 31°31′51″N 94°6′36″W	San Augustine	1998	
Bland-Fisher Home		7588	FM 3230 S of CR 110 31°35′26″N 94°6′45″W	San Augustine	1981	5 mi. north of San Augustine off 1279 next to BNSF rail line
Bodine Place		7591		San Augustine	1962	private property
Captain T. W. Blount House†	More images	7589	SH 21 W of Spur 85 31°31′56″N 94°10′3″W	San Augustine	1962	private property
China Grove - Dr. B. F. Sharp House		7595		San Augustine	1962	not located
Christ Church‡		7596	201 S. Ayish St. 31°31′42″N 94°6′21″W	San Augustine	1965	Ayish St. between Main and Market St.
Col. Sexton House		7641		San Augustine	1962	8 mi NW; private property
Columbus-Cartwright House		7593	End of S. Clark St. 31°31′25″N 94°5′57″W	San Augustine	1962	off SH 21 on Craft St.
Crocket House		7597		San Augustine	1962	burned
Cullen House†‡	More images	7598	205 S. Congress St. 31°31′35″N 94°6′28″W	San Augustine	1962	
Harring House - Straddle Fork		7615	FM 705 S of SH 103 31°23′21″N 94°9′32″W	San Augustine	1965	
Hillcrest		7616	1002 E. Main St. 31°31′37″N 94°5′53″W	San Augustine	1965	
Horatio Hanks House		7612		San Augustine	1962	West Walter Street, San Augustine
Inlow Lee Mathews House		7622		San Augustine	1962	
Ketchum Place		7620		San Augustine	1962	
Lewis Hotel		17066	500 W. Columbia St. 31°31′53″N 94°6′55″W	San Augustine	2011	
Mathews, Inlow and Jeanette, House		14786		San Augustine	2004	
Mathew Cartright Home†‡	More images	7594	503 E. Main St. 31°31′44″N 94°6′19″W	San Augustine	1962	
McCauley House		7623		San Augustine	1962	private property, no access
McRae Church		7625	CR 220 W of CR 277 31°31′56″N 94°11′10″W	San Augustine	1962	4 mi. west of San Augustine via SH 21, then .25 mi. north on McRae Cemetery Rd.
Memorial Presbyterian Church‡		17388	205 E. Livingston St. 31°31′54″N 94°6′29″W	San Augustine	1962	Spur 85 btwn FM 1277 and SH 21
Newt Whitton House (DEMOLISHED)		7649			1962	structure gone - no access
Norwood House		7630	SH 103 and SH 147	San Augustine	1962	private property - no access
Old Brookeland Depot		7592		San Augustine	1966	private property - no access
Old Garrett House		7606	SH 21 W of CR 271 31°30′19″N 94°17′4″W	San Augustine	1962	SH 21 about 11 mi. west of San Augustine
Old Greer House		7609	FM 1277 near US 96	San Augustine	1962	southwestern edge of San Augustine off FM 1277
Old Mott House		7628		San Augustine	1962	
Old Polk-Sharp House		7632	2 mi. E of FM 1277 W of town 9 mi.	San Augustine	1962	private property - no access
Old Union School		15560	1462 CR 278 31°30′40″N 94°11′5″W	San Augustine	1962	
Old Wade Place		7648	CR 313 E of FM 705 31°21′12″N 94°8′47″W	San Augustine	1962	FM 705 about 9.5 mi. south of San Augustine
"Pet" Sharp House‡		7642	105 N. Congress St. 31°31′51″N 94°6′30″W	San Augustine	1962	
Polk House†	More images	7631	717 W. Columbia St. 31°31′54″N 94°7′13″W	San Augustine	1962	SH 21 about 2 blocks west of junction Loop 547 and SH 21, south side of road
San Augustine County Courthouse†‡#	More images	12729	100 W. Columbia St. 31°31′49″N 94°6′41″W	San Augustine	2001	Courthouse square, Columbia at Broadway (SH 147) streets
San Augustine County Jail†‡#		18848	110 S. Harrison St. 31°31′48″N 94°6′40″W	San Augustine	2017	San Augustine County Courthouse grounds, east side facing Harrison Street
Simp Miller House		7626		San Augustine	1962	private property - no access
Stephen W. Blount Home‡		7590	503 E. Columbia St. 31°31′49″N 94°6′19″W	San Augustine	1962	
Straddle Fork		7643	FM 705 S of SH 103 31°23′21″N 94°9′32″W	San Augustine	1965	FM 705 about 8 mi. south of San Augustine
Sublett House	More images	7645	2419 SH 21 E 31°31′9″N 94°3′30″W	San Augustine	1962	SH 21, 4 mi. east of San Augustine
The Gatling House‡		7608	850 S. Liberty St. 31°31′9″N 94°6′43″W	San Augustine	1967	1 mi. south of San Augustine off FM 2213 (Liberty St.) in Gatling Manor
William Garrett House†	More images	7607	SH 21 W of CR 280 31°32′7″N 94°8′23″W	San Augustine	1962	1 mi. west of San Augustine via SH 21, north side of private road

== San Jacinto County ==
Registered Texas Historic Landmark	Image	Marker number	Physical address	Nearest city	Year designated	Location description
Coldspring Methodist Church		13848	1 Cemetery Rd. 30°35′33″N 95°7′49″W	Coldspring	1964	Coldspring United Methodist Church
J. M. Hansbro's Law Office		7656	11 Byrd Ave. 30°35′34″N 95°7′45″W	Coldspring	1967	across from Courthouse at SH 150 and FM 1514
San Jacinto County Courthouse†	More images	12481	1 Byrd Ave. 30°35′32″N 95°7′42″W	Coldspring	2000	Byrd Ave. at SH 150
San Jacinto County Jail†		7669	200 Slade St. 30°35′46″N 95°7′42″W	Coldspring	1982	just north of FM 1514 on Slade St. behind high school
Shepherd Methodist Church		7671	71 Spring Ave. 30°30′5″N 95°0′3″W	Shepherd	1970	just north of SH 150 on FM 222
The Robert Tod Robinson House		7667	500 SH 156 30°44′15″N 95°12′54″W	Point Blank	1975	SH 156, .75 mi. south of Point Blank

== San Patricio County ==
Registered Texas Historic Landmark	Image	Marker number	Physical address	Nearest city	Year designated	Location description
James McGloin Home†		14899	N end CR 899 at Round Lake 27°58′12″N 97°47′34″W	San Patricio	1963	private property off FM 666
Odem Building		3665	201 E. Sinton St. 28°2′13″N 97°30′33″W	Sinton	1994	Vineyard at Sinton Streets, Sinton

== San Saba County ==
Registered Texas Historic Landmark	Image	Marker number	Physical address	Nearest city	Year designated	Location description
Campbell House		686	505 W. Dry St. 31°11′38″N 98°43′31″W	San Saba	1994	505 Dry Street, San Saba.
Cedar Log Cabin Museum		772	271 S. Thomas Stewart Dr. 31°11′39″N 98°42′43″W	San Saba	1966	Mill Pend Park, E. city limits, Highway 190, San Saba.
Estep-Burleson Building		17736	120 S. Cherokee St. 31°11′43″N 98°43′4″W	San Saba	2013	interior of block west of courthouse, S. Cherokee Street
First Methodist Church		1743	204 W. Brown St. 31°11′49″N 98°43′22″W	San Saba	1965	204 West Brown Street, San Saba.
First State Bank Building		12496	SW corner Main Ave. at Center St. 31°16′26″N 98°56′42″W	Richland Springs	2001	corner of Main and Carter (FM 45)
Indian Signaling Grounds		2638	Rest area at US 190 about 4.5 mi. E of San Saba 31°12′18″N 98°38′22″W	San Saba	1967	From San Saba, take 190 east about 4.5 miles.
Mill Pond House		3379	E. Commerce St. at S. Mill St. 31°11′42″N 98°42′47″W	San Saba	1962	Mill Pond Park, 190, E. City Limits, San Saba (where E. Commerce meets S. Mill and Doug Sullivan).
San Saba County Courthouse†‡	More images	15199	500 E. Wallace St. 31°11′43″N 98°43′0″W	San Saba	2004	
San Saba County Jail		4555	104 S. Water St. 31°11′43″N 98°42′54″W	San Saba	1969	Corner of East Commerce and South Water, San Saba.
T. A. and Emma Sloan House		18220	8810 FM 2732	San Saba	2015	
Whitis-Moore House		14808	406 W. Commerce St. 31°11′43″N 98°43′28″W	San Saba	2005	406 W. Commerce

== Schleicher County ==
Registered Texas Historic Landmark	Image	Marker number	Physical address	Nearest city	Year designated	Location description
Colonel Black Ranch House		613	Ft. McKavett Cemetery Rd. 30°49′35″N 100°7′59″W	Fort McKavett	1962	From Ft. McKavett take FM 864 to Ft. McKavett Cemetery Road for 1.3 miles.
First National Bank Building		1532	109 S.W. Main St. 30°51′33″N 100°36′4″W	Eldorado	1993	109 S.W. Main Street
Old Courthouse and Jail		3639	1 W. Warner Ave. 30°51′38″N 100°35′54″W	Eldorado	1964	On Courthouse grounds at US 190 & 277 intersection, El Dorado
Schleicher County Courthouse		4406	164 E. Murchison Ave. 30°51′36″N 100°35′54″W	Eldorado	1991	
West Texas Woolen Mills		5683	409 S.W. Main St. 30°51′25″N 100°36′14″W	Eldorado	1994	409 SW Main St., Eldorado

== Scurry County ==
Registered Texas Historic Landmark	Image	Marker number	Physical address	Nearest city	Year designated	Location description
Dodson House		1239	900 E. Coliseum Dr. 32°42′22″N 100°53′24″W	Snyder	1965	Scurry County Heritage Village
E. W. Clark House, 1908		1315	2306 32nd St. 32°42′36″N 100°55′28″W	Snyder	1964	2306 32nd Street, Snyder.
F. J. Grayum Home		1524	2300 32nd St. 32°42′36″N 100°55′26″W	Snyder	1964	2300 32nd Street, Snyder.
First Presbyterian Church		1820	2706 Ave R. 32°42′52″N 100°55′1″W	Snyder	1969	2706 Avenue R, Snyder.
First State Bank Building		1870	2519 College Ave. 32°43′1″N 100°55′7″W	Snyder	1967	Corner College and 25th St., Snyder (northwest courthouse square)
Harrell Ranch House		14419	Ranch road near bend in FM 176 32°47′23″N 100°50′40″W	Snyder	1964	
Johnson House, 1910		2833	CR 1117 1.5 mi. N of CR 1116 32°50′48″N 100°50′31″W	Snyder	1964	From Snyder take Ennis Creek Road north about 10 miles. Turn east on county road 1116. Drive for about 1.6 miles, turn north on County Road 1117, 1.5 miles to house.
R. L. McMullan Home		4153	2311 Ave N. 32°43′6″N 100°54′45″W	Snyder	1966	2311 Avenue N, Snyder.
Stanfield House, 1910		5096	2400 32nd St. 32°42′36″N 100°55′32″W	Snyder	1964	2400 32nd Street, Snyder.
Towle House		16902	2911 Ave. U 32°42′46″N 100°55′18″W	Snyder	2011	NW corner of 30th & Ave. U

== Shackelford County ==
Registered Texas Historic Landmark	Image	Marker number	Physical address	Nearest city	Year designated	Location description
H. C. Jacobs House		2313	24 S. Jacobs St. 32°43′32″N 99°17′57″W	Albany	1974	Jacobs Street, Albany
Ledbetter Picket House		3059	112 S. Main St. 32°43′32″N 99°17′52″W	Albany	1962	Webb Park -112 Main Street -Albany
Matthews Memorial Presbyterian Church‡		3257	211 S. Jacobs St. 32°43′26″N 99°17′55″W	Albany	1962	Corner of Jacobs & S. 2nd Streets, Albany
Rye-Caperton House‡		4397	225 S. Walnut St. 32°43′22″N 99°17′44″W	Albany	1996	225 South Walnut, Albany
Shackelford County Courthouse‡#	More images	4649	225 S. Main St. 32°43′22″N 99°17′48″W	Albany	1962	Courthouse Square, intersection of SH 6 & Highway 180, Albany
Shackelford County's First Permanent Jail‡		4650	201 S. Second St. 32°43′24″N 99°17′41″W	Albany	1962	South 2nd Street, Albany
The Lynch Building‡		5373	340 S. Second St. 32°43′25″N 99°17′50″W	Albany	1975	Faces courthouse grounds, intersection of SH 6 & Highway 180, Albany
Trinity Episcopal Church		5559	325 N. Ave. B 32°43′48″N 99°17′58″W	Albany	1962	N. 2nd Street & Avenue B, Albany
Hartfield Building‡		12365	224 W. Main St. 32°43′22″N 99°17′51″W	Albany	2000	Courthouse Square
White Elephant Saloon‡		14887	232 S. Main St. 32°43′22″N 99°17′51″W	Albany	1998	S. Main St

== Shelby County ==
Registered Texas Historic Landmark	Image	Marker number	Physical address	Nearest city	Year designated	Location description
Eva Taylor Lane Home		7685	212 Houston St. 31°47′37″N 94°10′50″W	Center	1963	
First Methodist Church of Shelbyville		7683	252 FM 417 31°45′29″N 94°4′46″W	Shelbyville	1963	off SH 87 on Church St.
McClelland Community Church		7687	519 CR 2571 31°39′44″N 94°4′19″W	Shelbyville	1963	7 mi. south of Shelbyville, via SH 87 to SH 147 S to McClelland, then east on county road
Myrick's Ferry Log House		7689	Forest Service Road 100	Shelbyville	1963	14 mi. east of Shelbyville
Shelby County Courthouse†#		7695	124 Austin St. 31°47′41″N 94°10′53″W	Center	1969	
The Bickham House		7676	FM 2694 E of CR 2100 31°45′52″N 94°3′1″W	Shelbyville	1973	2 mi. east of Shelbyville via SH 147 to FM 2694

== Sherman County ==
Registered Texas Historic Landmark	Image	Marker number	Physical address	Nearest city	Year designated	Location description
Sherman County Courthouse		16130	701 N. 3rd St. 36°20′17″N 102°4′13″W	Stratford	2008	

== Smith County ==
Registered Texas Historic Landmark	Image	Marker number	Physical address	Nearest city	Year designated	Location description
Chilton-Lipstate-Taylor House‡		17993	727 S. Chilton Ave. 32°20′29″N 95°18′19″W	Tyler	2014	house sits at the south west corner of South Chilton Avenue and West PhillipsStreet
Dewberry Plantation House†	More images	7719	14007 FM 346 W 32°9′32″N 95°24′17″W	Teaselville	1962	4 miles west of Bullard on FM 344, then 0.5 mi. N of Teasleville on FM 346
Erasmus M. Hanna House		7731	118 N. Georgia St. 32°8′43″N 95°7′13″W	Troup	1968	
First Baptist Church of Tyler	More images	7724	301 W. Ferguson St. 32°21′7″N 95°18′11″W	Tyler	1987	
Frank Bell House		7704	17566 Beddingfield Rd. 32°13′27″N 95°19′56″W	Tyler	1978	
Goodman Home, 1857†#		7730	624 N. Broadway Ave. 32°21′24″N 95°18′5″W	Tyler	1962	
Henry Gary House		14546	0.3 mi. S on US 69 from CR 461 32°27′34″N 95°23′0″W	Starrville	1962	
John B. and Ketura Douglas House†		12193	318 S. Fannin Ave. 32°20′51″N 95°17′54″W	Tyler	1998	
Major John Dean House		7718	11810 CR 1141 32°18′36″N 95°24′26″W	Tyler	1972	take SH 31 west about 5 mi. to Spur 364, go south about .5 mi. to CR 1134, go west 1 mi. to CR 1141, go south on CR 1141 .6 mi. to house on west side of road
Marvin Methodist Church†	More images	7741	300 W. Erwin St. 32°21′1″N 95°18′11″W	Tyler	1968	
Ramey House†‡		12196	605 S. Broadway Ave. 32°20′37″N 95°18′4″W	Tyler	1997	
Smith County Jail, 1881†		7723	309 E. Erwin St. 32°21′2″N 95°17′53″W	Tyler	1993	
Starrville Community Center		17352	17936 FM 16 E 32°28′13″N 95°6′18″W	Winona	2012	17936 FM 16 E, South side of FM 16 E, 1 mile East of Starrville Well Historical Marker
The Connally Home‡		7715	700 S. Broadway Ave. 32°20′32″N 95°18′0″W	Tyler	1983	
The George R. Philips House		7750		Tyler	1978	
The Patterson Home		7749	1311 W. Oakwood St. 32°21′23″N 95°18′55″W	Tyler	1975	
Tyler Carnegie Library†#	More images	16531	125 S. College Ave. 32°21′0″N 95°18′7″W	Tyler	2010	northwest corner of East Elm St. and South College Ave.
Whisenhunt-Kinzie House		15545	205 S. Main St. 32°30′51″N 95°24′35″W	Lindale	2008	
Whitaker-McClendon House†		7767	806 W. Houston St. 32°20′36″N 95°18′34″W	Tyler	1988	
Woman's Building‡		7768	911 S. Broadway Ave. 32°20′19″N 95°18′4″W	Tyler	1990	

== Somervell County ==
Registered Texas Historic Landmark	Image	Marker number	Physical address	Nearest city	Year designated	Location description
A. J. Hart Home - 1884		13767	CR 404 at FM 199 32°13′51″N 97°40′2″W	Glen Rose	1965	From Somervell, US 67 E 8 mi., then SW on FM 199
Barnard's Mill†#	More images	304	307 SW Barnard St. 32°13′54″N 97°45′24″W	Glen Rose	1962	315 SW Barnard St.
Booker Home		13768	1396 W. US 67 32°14′7″N 97°45′21″W	Glen Rose	1963	US 67, 2 mi. W of Glen Rose
Campbell Building‡	More images	684	200-202 NE Barnard St. 32°14′7″N 97°45′17″W	Glen Rose	1971	
First National Bank‡	More images	1781	100 NE Bernard St. 32°14′5″N 97°45′19″W	Glen Rose	1964	
Marks-English Hospital†#	More images	15571	307 SW Barnard St. 32°13′55″N 97°45′25″W	Glen Rose	1962	
Old Somervell County Jail‡		3814	101 W. Cedar St. 32°14′4″N 97°45′23″W	Glen Rose	1962	Corner of Cedar and Vernon, Glen Rose
Parker-Davis House, 1890		13765	NE of CR 1008 near Hood County line 32°17′3″N 97°50′54″W	Glen Rose	1964	From Glen Rose, 9 mi. N on FM 201, 2 mi. W on CR.
Snyder Sanitarium‡		13766	205 SW Barnard St. 32°14′1″N 97°45′21″W	Glen Rose	1985	209 SW Barnard St.
Somervell County Courthouse†‡#	More images	4978	101 NE Barnard St. 32°14′7″N 97°45′21″W	Glen Rose	1963	Courthouse Square, Glen Rose

== Starr County ==
Registered Texas Historic Landmark	Image	Marker number	Physical address	Nearest city	Year designated	Location description
Decker House		6061	S. Britton Ave. and Water St. 26°22′42″N 98°49′15″W	Rio Grande City	1964	Corner of Britton and Water Streets, Rio Grande City. Not Located
Early Commercial Center⁕	More images	6062	Marker on W side Portsheller St. at Main Plaza 26°24′21″N 99°1′6″W	Roma	1973	Main Plaza and Hidalgo Street, Roma.
Early Commercial Center⁕	More images	14283	Marker on W side Portsheller St. at Main Plaza 26°24′21″N 99°1′6″W	Roma	1973	
First Chapel in Roma⁂		1697	708 Estrella St. 26°24′25″N 99°1′4″W	Roma	1973	(Estrella and Lincoln Street, Roma), 708 Estrella, Roma.
Fort Ringgold, C.S.A.		2013	Ringgold Ave. at Lee Cir. 26°22′39″N 98°48′35″W	Rio Grande City	1965	At Fort main entrance on school grounds, Rio Grande City.
Howard L. Bass Home‡		2584	100 Washington St. 26°22′41″N 98°49′4″W	Rio Grande City	1966	Corner of Main Street and Washington Street, Rio Grande City.
John Peter Kelsey Home		2798	E. Mirasoles St. near S. Britton Ave. 26°22′43″N 98°49′15″W	Rio Grande City	1966	Corner of Water Street and Mierisoles Street, Rio Grande City.
Knights of Columbus Hall⁂		6058	901 Estrella St. 26°24′28″N 99°1′7″W	Roma	1963	901 Estrella Street, Roma.
Lee House‡		6059	Lee Cir. across from Officers' Quarters 26°22′27″N 98°48′32″W	Rio Grande City	1965	Fort Ringgold, US 83, Rio Grande City.
Manuel Guerra Home and Store⁂#	More images	3200	702 Portsheller St. 26°24′22″N 99°1′6″W	Roma	1973	Main Plaza and Portsheller Street, Roma.
Memorial Hospital⁂	More images	3324	SW corner Estrella St. at Convent Ave. 26°24′22″N 99°1′4″W	Roma	1965	Estrella Street at Main Plaza, Roma.
Noah Cox House⁂		6055	101 Convent Ave. 26°24′21″N 99°1′8″W	Roma	1963	101 Main Plaza - overlooking Rio Grande, Roma.
Old Garcia Home⁂	More images	3734	102 Convent Ave. 26°24′19″N 99°1′8″W	Roma	1964	On Main Plaza overlooking Rio Grande River, Roma.
Old Ringgold Barracks Hospital‡		3794	Lee Cir. at Ringgold Ave. 26°22′36″N 98°48′37″W	Rio Grande City	1965	Highway 83, Fort Ringgold, Rio Grande City.
Old Roma Convent Building⁂		4342	NE corner Estrella St. at Convent Ave. 26°24′24″N 99°1′3″W	Roma	1964	Estrella Street at Main Plaza, Roma.
Our Lady of Refuge Catholic Church⁂	More images	3885	4 W. St. Eugene de Mazedon Ave. 26°24′23″N 99°1′2″W	Roma	1962	On Old Main Plaza, Roma.
Ramirez Hall⁂		4174	NE corner Portsheller St. and Convent Ave. 26°24′21″N 99°1′5″W	Roma	1973	Corner of Portscheller Street and Main Plaza, Roma.
Ramirez Memorial Hospital⁂	More images	15532	SW corner Estrella St. at Convent Ave. 26°24′22″N 99°1′4″W	Roma	1965	
Roma City Hall⁂		4341	101 Water St. 26°24′22″N 99°1′11″W	Roma	1963	Corner of Hidalgo and Gonzalez Avenues, Roma.

== Stephens County ==
Registered Texas Historic Landmark	Image	Marker number	Physical address	Nearest city	Year designated	Location description
B. T. Brown House		257	US 183 at Brown Branch Creek bridge 32°44′24″N 98°54′4″W	Breckenridge	1976	Just east of US 183 at the south edge of Breckenridge. Driveway is just south of Brown Branch Creek Bridge.
Breckenridge Stephens Walker Home		498	1000 E. Connell St. 32°45′35″N 98°53′25″W	Breckenridge	1984	1000 E. Connell, Breckenridge.
Old First National Bank Building		1784	116 W. Walker St. 32°45′21″N 98°54′12″W	Breckenridge	1984	116 W. Walker, Breckenridge.
Stephens County Courthouse†#		5111	200 W. Walker St. 32°45′21″N 98°54′15″W	Breckenridge	1997	SE corner of courthouse square, US 180, Breckenridge.

== Sterling County ==
Registered Texas Historic Landmark	Image	Marker number	Physical address	Nearest city	Year designated	Location description
Brown House		533	Labadie St. and 7th St. 31°50′23″N 100°58′21″W	Sterling City	1962	Corner of Labapie and 7th Street, Sterling City
Concho, San Saba & Llano Valley Railroad Station	More images	1019	410 Stadium St. 31°50′32″N 100°59′4″W	Sterling City	1981	Corner of Stadium Drive and north end of Washington Street, Sterling City
R. P. Brown Home		4154	705 5th St. 31°50′15″N 100°59′21″W	Sterling City	1962	705 5th Avenue, Sterling City
Sterling County Jail		5114	4th St. and Elm St., on Courthouse lawn 31°50′9″N 100°59′17″W	Sterling City	1981	Courthouse Square corner of 4th and Elm Streets, Sterling City

== Stonewall County ==
There are currently no Recorded Texas Historic Landmarks listed within the county.

== Sutton County ==
Registered Texas Historic Landmark	Image	Marker number	Physical address	Nearest city	Year designated	Location description
Fort Terrett Headquarters		2024	CR 307 off IH-10 via exit 429 30°27′47″N 100°11′9″W	Sonora	1962	From Sonora, take I-10 East about 30 miles to Exit 429 go under I-10 to FM 3130, go East on 3130 about 1 mile to CR 307, go down CR 307 about 1 mile to Ranch Headquarters *Private property*
Old Mercantile Building†		3765	232 E. Main St. 30°34′18″N 100°38′40″W	Sonora	1982	Corner of Water and Main Streets, Sonora
Old Rock Schoolhouse		3798	300 block of College St. 30°33′54″N 100°38′23″W	Sonora	1990	300 block of College Street, Sonora
Site of Fort Terrett		4799	CR 307 off IH-10 via exit 429 30°27′47″N 100°11′9″W	Sonora	1962	From Sonora, take I-10 East about 30 miles to Exit 429 go under I-10 to FM 3130, go east on 3130 about 1 mile to CR 307, go down CR 307 about 1 mile to marker
Sutton County Courthouse†#	More images	5157	300 E. Oak St. 30°34′20″N 100°38′37″W	Sonora	1962	Corner of Water and Main Streets, Sonora
Sutton County Jail		5158	300 E. Oak St. 30°34′24″N 100°38′39″W	Sonora	1975	Courthouse Square; Corner of Water and Main Streets, Sonora
The Ike Miers House		5357	307 E. Oak St. 30°34′15″N 100°38′55″W	Sonora	1970	309 Oak Street, Sonora

== Swisher County ==
Registered Texas Historic Landmark	Image	Marker number	Physical address	Nearest city	Year designated	Location description
Elm Tree Inn		1466	200 W. Broadway Ave. 34°32′15″N 101°45′58″W	Tulia	1962	200 West Broadway-Tulia, not located
Flynt Building		1932	136 S. Maxwell Ave. 34°32′11″N 101°45′53″W	Tulia	1969	136 South Maxwell-Tulia
JA Ranch Cabin		2689	E side 200 block Armstrong Ave. S of Tulia City Hall 34°32′6″N 101°45′56″W	Tulia	1969	127 S.W. Main Street at Swisher County Museum
Swisher County Courthouse		5170	119 S. Maxwell Ave. 34°32′12″N 101°45′50″W	Tulia	1962	Courthouse Square, Broadway & Briscoe, Tulia
Tulia Depot		16606	End of W. Broadway Ave. 34°32′14″N 101°46′40″W	Tulia	2010	Broadway at BNSF railroad tracks
Tulia First National Bank		5567	101 N. Maxwell Ave. 34°32′15″N 101°45′54″W	Tulia	1962	at intersection of West Broadway & Briscoe, Tulia

== Tarrant County ==
Registered Texas Historic Landmark	Image	Marker number	Physical address	Nearest city	Year designated	Location description
Administration Building		5986	1201 Wesleyan St. 32°43′57″N 97°16′49″W	Fort Worth	1962	Texas Wesleyan College
Alice E. Carlson Elementary School#		12202	3320 W. Cantey St. 32°42′44″N 97°21′52″W	Fort Worth	2000	
Allen Chapel A.M.E. Church†	More images	124	116 Elm St. 32°45′32″N 97°19′39″W	Fort Worth	1983	
Ann Waggoner Hall		169	1301 Wesleyan St. 32°43′53″N 97°16′50″W	Fort Worth	1967	Texas Wesleyan University, Ann Waggoner Fine Arts Building, northeast corner Wesleyan and E. Rosedale streets
Arlington Heights Lodge No. 1184, A.F. and A.M	More images	200	4600 Camp Bowie Blvd. 32°44′25″N 97°23′18″W	Fort Worth	1987	
Atelier Building		229	209 W. Eighth St. 32°45′5″N 97°19′50″W	Fort Worth	1980	
Baldridge House		286	5100 Crestline Rd. 32°44′25″N 97°23′51″W	Fort Worth	1978	
Benton House†‡	More images	375	1730 Sixth Ave. 32°43′31″N 97°20′24″W	Fort Worth	1971	
Bidault House		401	1416 Glade Rd. 32°52′55″N 97°8′43″W	Colleyville	1980	
Blackstone Hotel†	More images	12201	601-615 Main St. 32°45′13″N 97°19′48″W	Fort Worth	1998	
Bryce Building†	More images	550	909 Throckmorton St. 32°45′4″N 97°19′50″W	Fort Worth	1983	909 Throckmorton, Fort Worth
Cobb-Burney House		925	1598 Sunset Ter. 32°44′37″N 97°20′38″W	Fort Worth	1985	1598 Sunset Terrace, Ft. Worth.
Curzon Place		17337	3108 Winthrop Ave. 32°43′47″N 97°24′58″W	Fort Worth	2012	South side of Curzon Ave between Winthrop Ave and Westridge Ave
Dorris-Brock House		16322	805 N. Main St. 32°56′49″N 97°4′42″W	Grapevine	2010	Grapevine, 805 N. Main St.
Douglass-Potts House‡	More images	12204	206 W. North St. 32°44′25″N 97°6′32″W	Arlington	1999	
Dr. Clay Johnson House†‡	More images	1266	3 Chase Ct. 32°43′31″N 97°19′54″W	Fort Worth	1983	#3 Chase Ct., Fort Worth
Dr. George M. Munchus House‡	More images	1269	1130 E. Terrell Ave. 32°44′7″N 97°18′43″W	Fort Worth	1985	1130 E. Terrell Ave.
Eddleman-McFarland House†	More images	1385	1110 Penn St. 32°44′50″N 97°20′33″W	Fort Worth	1980	1110 Penn St., Fort Worth
Fairfield Gates Apartments		17336	3200 Fairfield Ave. 32°43′42″N 97°25′8″W	Fort Worth	2012	Southwest corner of Fairfield Ave and Greenway Ave
Fairview, William J. Bryce House†	More images	1556	4900 Bryce Ave. 32°44′23″N 97°23′35″W	Fort Worth	1983	4900 Bryce St., Fort Worth
Fielder House		1594	1616 W. Abram St. 32°44′7″N 97°7′52″W	Arlington	1979	1616 W. Abram, Arlington
First TV in Texas		14651	3900 Barnett St. 32°45′1″N 97°15′54″W	Fort Worth	1967	
Flatiron Building†	More images	1910	1000 Houston St. 32°45′1″N 97°19′46″W	Fort Worth	1970	1000 Houston St., Fort Worth
Florence Shuman Hall‡		1921	1300 Pennsylvania Ave. 32°44′20″N 97°20′22″W	Fort Worth	1967	1300 Pennsylvania Ave., Fort Worth
Former TSTA Building		1956	410 E. Weatherford St. 32°45′30″N 97°19′48″W	Fort Worth	1981	410 E. Weatherford, Fort Worth
Fort Worth Elks Lodge 124†	More images	2027	512 W. Fourth St. 32°45′10″N 97°20′5″W	Fort Worth	1986	512 W. 4th St., Fort Worth
Fort Worth Livestock Exchange‡	More images	2029	201 E. Exchange Ave. 32°47′20″N 97°20′48″W	Fort Worth	1967	201 E. Exchange St., Fort Worth
Fort Worth Main Post Office Building†	More images	2030	251 W. Lancaster Ave. 32°44′47″N 97°19′46″W	Fort Worth	1980	251 W. Lancaster, Ft. Worth
Fort Worth Public Market Building†	More images	2031	1400 Henderson St. 32°44′39″N 97°20′16″W	Fort Worth	1980	1400 Henderson, Fort Worth
Fort Worth Stock Yards Entrance‡#	More images	2033	100 blk. E. Exchange Ave. 32°47′20″N 97°20′55″W	Fort Worth	1985	100 block of E. Exchange St., Fort Worth (2 markers on portal columns on either side of street)
Friday House		12206	1906 Ambers Cir. 32°43′50″N 97°4′46″W	Arlington	1999	
Garvey-Veihl House		2105	769 Samuels Ave. 32°46′7″N 97°19′52″W	Fort Worth	1993	769 Samuels Ave, Fort Worth
General Thomas N. Waul, C.S.A.‡		2142	Oakwood Cemetery Section 31, 700 Grand Ave. 32°46′13″N 97°20′55″W	Fort Worth	1983	701 Grand Ave., Fort Worth; Oakwood Cemetery, Section 31
George B. Monnig House		2150	115 W. Broadway Ave. 32°44′27″N 97°19′36″W	Fort Worth	1985	115 W. Broadway, Fort Worth
Grammer-Pierce House‡		18100	2232 College Ave. 32°43′10″N 97°20′7″W	Fort Worth	2015	
Greater Saint James Baptist Church†	More images	2266	210 Harding St. 32°45′34″N 97°19′28″W	Fort Worth	1986	210 Harding St., Fort Worth
Gunhild Weber House‡		2305	1404 S. Adams St. 32°43′45″N 97°20′13″W	Fort Worth	1978	1404 S. Adams, Fort Worth
Hamilton House		15314	600 S. Collins St. 32°43′49″N 97°5′53″W	Arlington	2000	
Hemphill Presbyterian Church		2435	1701 Hemphill St. 32°43′33″N 97°19′52″W	Fort Worth	1984	1701 Hemphill St.
Henry M. Williams Home		2450	4926 Crestline Rd. 32°44′30″N 97°23′45″W	Fort Worth	1982	4926 Crestline Rd., Fort Worth
Hotel Texas†	More images	2574	815 Main St. 32°45′9″N 97°19′45″W	Fort Worth	1982	815 Main St., Fort Worth at main entrance, inside.
Hutcheson-Smith Home†‡	More images	2601	312 N. Oak St. 32°44′24″N 97°6′33″W	Arlington	1982	312 N. Oak St., Arlington
Ida Saunders Hall‡		2614	1320 Pennsylvania Ave. 32°44′20″N 97°20′25″W	Fort Worth	1966	1300 block of Pennsylvania Ave., Fort Worth
J. D. Cooper House		2671	211 Willis Ave. 32°44′5″N 97°5′33″W	Arlington	1965	211 Willis St., entrance to Meadowbrook Park. House damaged by fire 1999, possibly moved. RTHL marker may be in Fielder Museum.
James-Fujita House		2741	2530 College Ave. 32°42′52″N 97°20′8″W	Fort Worth	1986	2530 College Ave, Fort Worth
Kennedale Independent School District		18476	120 W. Kennedale Pkwy. 32°38′53″N 97°13′19″W	Kennedale	2016	
Knights of Pythias†	More images	2967	315 Main St. 32°45′19″N 97°19′52″W	Fort Worth	1962	110 East Third St., Fort Worth.
Land Title Building	More images	3030	155 E. Fourth St. 32°45′18″N 97°19′51″W	Fort Worth	1979	111 W. 4th, Fort Worth
Laneri House		3033	902 S. Jennings Ave. 32°44′7″N 97°19′49″W	Fort Worth	1982	902 S. Jennings Ave., Fort Worth
Lanius House		3035	2420 S. Adams St. 32°42′57″N 97°20′13″W	Fort Worth	1985	2420 W. Adams, Fort Worth
Margaret Meacham Hall‡		3210	1326 Pennsylvania Ave. 32°44′20″N 97°20′26″W	Fort Worth	1967	1326 Pennsylvania Avenue, Fort Worth
Marshall R. Sanguinet House†	More images	3224	4729 Collinwood Ave. 32°44′14″N 97°23′26″W	Fort Worth	1981	4729 Collinwood, Fort Worth
Masonic Temple Association of Fort Worth†	More images	3246	1100 Henderson St. 32°44′50″N 97°20′18″W	Fort Worth	1984	1100 Henderson, Fort Worth
Maxwell-Liston House		3265	712 May St. 32°44′12″N 97°19′46″W	Fort Worth	1985	712 May. St, Fort Worth
Mitchell-Schoonover Home‡	More images	3425	600 Eighth Ave. 32°44′18″N 97°20′39″W	Fort Worth	1979	600 S. 8th Ave, Ft.Worth
Nash Farm†	More images	17960	626 Ball St. 32°56′3″N 97°5′9″W	Grapevine	2014	The nominated property includes all land bounded by West College Street, Ball Street, and Homestead Lane in Grapevine, Tarrant County, Texas.
Neil P. Anderson Building†	More images	3569	411 W. Seventh St. 32°45′3″N 97°19′56″W	Fort Worth	1978	
Nugent-Hart House		3628	312 S. Waxahachie St. 32°33′37″N 97°8′13″W	Mansfield	1983	
Oakwood Cemetery†	More images	3659	701 Grand Ave. 32°46′10″N 97°20′52″W	Fort Worth	1966	Grand at Gould Avenue, Oakwood Cemetery, at gate, Fort Worth
Pioneer Cabin (STOLEN)		14084		Fort Worth	1962	
Pollock-Capps House†	More images	4066	1120 Penn St. 32°44′49″N 97°20′33″W	Fort Worth	1977	1120 Penn St., Fort Worth
Ponton, Dr. Arvel and Faye, House†	More images	15259	1208 Mistletoe Dr. 32°43′50″N 97°21′22″W	Fort Worth	2008	1208 Mistletoe Dr.
Ralph Man Homestead		54390		Mansfield	1977	604 W. Broad St.
Rogers-O'Daniel House†	More images	4339	2230 Warner Rd. 32°42′35″N 97°20′50″W	Fort Worth	1984	2230 Warner Rd., Fort Worth
Saint Ignatius Academy Building†	More images	4441	1206-12 Throckmorton St. 32°44′55″N 97°19′47″W	Fort Worth	1962	1206-12 Throckmorton, Fort Worth
Saint Mary of the Assumption Roman Catholic Church†	More images	4464	509 W. Magnolia Ave. 32°43′49″N 97°19′48″W	Fort Worth	1979	509 W. Magnolia Ave., Fort Worth
Saint Patrick's Cathedral†	More images	4475	1206 Throckmorton St. 32°44′57″N 97°19′48″W	Fort Worth	1962	1206 Throckmorton, Fort Worth
Sandidge-Walker House		4565	2420 College Ave. 32°42′57″N 97°20′8″W	Fort Worth	1986	2420 College Ave, Fort Worth
Santa Fe Depot†	More images	4577	1501 Jones St. 32°44′57″N 97°19′26″W	Fort Worth	1970	1501 Jones, Fort Worth
Sinclair Building†	More images	4709	512 Main St. 32°45′14″N 97°19′51″W	Fort Worth	1993	512 Main St., Fort Worth
Tarrant County Courthouse†#	More images	5195	100 W. Weatherford St. 32°45′26″N 97°19′58″W	Fort Worth	1969	Main at Weatherford Streets, Fort Worth
Tarrant County Criminal Courts Building		5196	200 W. Belknap St. 32°45′27″N 97°20′5″W	Fort Worth	1984	200 W. Belknap, Fort Worth
Tarrant County State Bank Building‡		5197	332 S. Main St. 32°56′17″N 97°4′43″W	Grapevine	1986	332 S. Main Street, Grapevine
Texas Garden Clubs, Inc., Headquarters†	More images	16969	3111 Old Garden Rd. 32°44′9″N 97°21′52″W	Fort Worth	2011	3111 Old Garden Road, Fort Worth
Texas & Pacific Railroad Passenger Terminal†	More images	5243	211 W. Lancaster Ave. 32°44′45″N 97°19′43″W	Fort Worth	1980	Lancaster & Throckmorton St., Fort Worth
Thannisch Block Building‡	More images	5278	101-109 E. Exchange Ave. 32°47′21″N 97°20′56″W	Fort Worth	1983	109 E. Exchange Avenue, Fort Worth
The Sanctuary - Gustavaus Adolphus Church		5423	400 Hemphill St. 32°44′27″N 97°19′55″W	Fort Worth	1984	400 Hemphill, Ft. Worth
Thistle Hill, The Cattle Baron's Mansion†	More images	5463	1509 Pennsylvania Ave. 32°44′16″N 97°20′32″W	Fort Worth	1977	1509 Pennsylvania Ave., Fort Worth
Thomas G. & Marjorie Shaw House†	More images	5469	2404 Medford Ct. E. 32°43′3″N 97°21′24″W	Fort Worth	1993	2404 Medford Ct., East, Fort Worth
Torian Log Cabin		5508	205 S. Main St. 32°56′22″N 97°4′41″W	Grapevine	1978	205 Main St. Grapevine
Van Zandt Cottage†	More images	5635	2900 Crestline Rd. 32°44′39″N 97°21′32″W	Fort Worth	1962	2900 Crestline Rd., Trinity Park. Marker reported missing Jul. 2006.
Newby, W.G., Memorial Building‡		14114	1316 Pennsylvania Ave. 32°44′20″N 97°20′24″W	Fort Worth	1967	
Watauga Presbyterian Church		5723	6209 Rusk St. 32°51′37″N 97°16′3″W	Haltom City	1972	6209 Rusk St., Haltom City
Westbrook Estate†	More images	15766	2232 Winton Terrace W. 32°43′15″N 97°21′35″W	Fort Worth	2009	
Westover Manor†	More images	5771	8 Westover Rd. 32°44′31″N 97°24′14″W	Westover Hills	1988	8 Westover Rd., Westover Hills
William Reeves House‡	More images	5845	2200 Hemphill St. 32°43′13″N 97°19′55″W	Fort Worth	1984	2200 Hemphill, Fort Worth

== Taylor County ==
Registered Texas Historic Landmark	Image	Marker number	Physical address	Nearest city	Year designated	Location description
Abilene Woman's Club Building		13446	3425 S. 14th St. 32°25′55″N 99°46′5″W	Abilene	2005	3425 South 14th
Butler, Dr. William & Beatrice, Home		14834	701 Mesquite St. 32°27′21″N 99°43′46″W	Abilene	2008	
Ernie Wilson Museum		1497	133 Williams St. 32°17′10″N 99°49′36″W	Buffalo Gap	1962	At Buffalo Gap Village, off Highway 89, Buffalo Gap
First Taylor County Jail - Courthouse†	More images	1597	133 Williams St. 32°17′10″N 99°49′36″W	Buffalo Gap	1962	Buffalo Gap Village, off Highway 89
Hardin-Simmons University	More images	2373	2200 Hickory St. 32°28′35″N 99°44′4″W	Abilene	1967	Hardin-Simmons University, corner of Ambler & Simmons Street, Abilene
Hattie and Henry Sayles Sr. House†‡	More images	2406	642 Sayles Blvd. 32°26′37″N 99°44′53″W	Abilene	1994	642 Sayles Blvd., Abilene
Hotel Wooten‡	More images	14423	1102 N. Third St. 32°27′7″N 99°44′4″W	Abilene	2008	1102 N. Third St.
Lawn Atlas ICBM Launch Facility		16131	1990 FM 604 32°8′26″N 99°42′13″W	Lawn	2008	
Lytle Gap-Potosi Methodist Church		3157	2832 Potosi Rd. 32°19′55″N 99°39′28″W	Abilene	1981	From Abilene, take FM 1750 southeast about 8 miles, then follow county road .25 mile north. Church reported destroyed by fire Sep. 2015.
Magee House†	More images	3292	1910 N. Third St. 32°27′11″N 99°44′33″W	Abilene	1971	1910 N. 3rd Street, Abilene
Miss Clara Bussell		3400	706 Cedar St. 32°27′22″N 99°44′6″W	Abilene	1967	706 N. Cedar Street, Abilene
Old Weather Bureau Building†	More images	3833	1482 N. First St. 32°27′0″N 99°44′20″W	Abilene	1981	1482 N. 1st Street, Abilene
Sacred Heart Catholic Church†	More images	4432	1633 S. Eighth St. 32°26′27″N 99°44′32″W	Abilene	1990	1633 S. 8th Street, Abilene
Site of Curfew by John J. Clinton		4766	S. First St. and Chestnut St. 32°26′54″N 99°44′1″W	Abilene	1967	S. 1st & Chestnut Streets, Abilene
Texas & Pacific Railroad Depot	More images	18416	1101 N. First St. 32°26′57″N 99°44′4″W	Abilene	2016	South Side of North First Street between Cypress Street and Cedar
William G. and Shirley Swenson Home†		16526	1726 Swenson St. 32°28′10″N 99°44′28″W	Abilene	2010	on block surrounded by N. 18th, Swenson, N. 17th & Merchant

== Terrell County ==
Registered Texas Historic Landmark	Image	Marker number	Physical address	Nearest city	Year designated	Location description
El Buen Pastor Methodist Church		1407	SW corner 3rd St. and E. Pine St. 30°8′26″N 102°33′39″W	Sanderson	1962	corner of 3rd and Pine St., Sanderson
Sanderson State Bank		4564	100 Persimmon Ave. 30°8′26″N 102°23′57″W	Sanderson	1962	Corner of Persimmon and Dawnie Sts., Sanderson

== Terry County ==
Registered Texas Historic Landmark	Image	Marker number	Physical address	Nearest city	Year designated	Location description
A. M. Brownfield Home		56	600 E. Cardwell St. 33°10′33″N 102°16′8″W	Brownfield	1985	600 East Cardwell, Brownfield
M. B. Sawyer Ranch House		3159	CR 480 0.25 mi. E of FM 403 33°7′24″N 102°17′17″W	Brownfield	1970	From Brownfield, take FM 403 South about 7.3 miles to county road; take county road 1/4 mile east.
Old Daugherty House		3718	1206 Tahoka Rd. 33°10′51″N 102°15′40″W	Brownfield	1969	1206 Tahoka Road, Brownfield.

== Throckmorton County ==
Registered Texas Historic Landmark	Image	Marker number	Physical address	Nearest city	Year designated	Location description
Throckmorton County Courthouse†#		15081	105 N. Minter Ave. 33°10′44″N 99°10′40″W	Throckmorton	2008	

== Titus County ==
Registered Texas Historic Landmark	Image	Marker number	Physical address	Nearest city	Year designated	Location description
Broadstreet Farmhouse		11170	2357 US 67 33°10′59″N 94°55′36″W	Mt. Pleasant	1972	3 mi. E on US 67
Center Grove Cemetery		11171	0.4 mi. E on CR 4340 from FM 1000 33°7′46″N 94°50′43″W	Mt. Pleasant	1983	About 7 mi E of Mt Pleasant via SH 49 to N FM 1993 then right on CR SE 39
Cooper's Chapel Church and Cemetery		11172	CR 3425 at FM 1993 33°16′17″N 94°51′28″W	Mt. Pleasant	1993	About 12 mi NE of Mt. Pleasant via US 30 to FM 1993, N about 1.5 mi
Florey Home		11176	702 S. Lide Ave. 33°9′4″N 94°57′44″W	Mt. Pleasant	1982	
Greenhill Presbyterian Church Building		11178	350 CR 1660 33°14′59″N 94°59′26″W	Mt. Pleasant	1963	Off FM 2152 on CR, in Green Hill Community
Home of William Augusta Old		11169		Mt. Pleasant	1964	
Monticello Missionary Baptist Church		13957	FM 127 at CR 2715 33°5′32″N 95°5′16″W	Mt. Pleasant	2007	8.5 mi SW on FM 127
Old, William August, Home		14352		Mt. Pleasant	1966	
The Lide House		11180	315 E. Third St. 33°9′29″N 94°57′56″W	Mt. Pleasant	1971	
W. A. Keith House		11179	US 67	Cookville	1970	US 67 in Cookville, About 7 mi E of Mt. Pleasant
W. R. M. Slaughter Home		11181	1 mi. N of Greenhill community	Mt. Pleasant	1965	

== Tom Green County ==
Registered Texas Historic Landmark	Image	Marker number	Physical address	Nearest city	Year designated	Location description
Administration Building of the Fort Concho Museum⁂#		87	Burgess St. between E. Ave. C and E. Ave. D at E. center line of parade ground 31°27′15″N 100°25′40″W	San Angelo	1962	Fort Concho on Center Green, N. End, between Avenues C & D, San Angelo
Chapel & Schoolhouse⁂#		15367	E. Ave. D and Burgess St. 31°27′11″N 100°25′43″W	San Angelo	1962	
Chapel and School House of Fort Concho⁂#		805	E. Ave. D and Burgess St. 31°27′11″N 100°25′43″W	San Angelo	1962	Located on southwest corner of intersection of E. Ave. D and Burgess Street. Fort Concho, San Angelo
Emanuel Episcopal Church†		15549	3 S. Randolph St. 31°27′44″N 100°26′27″W	San Angelo	1967	
Emmanuel Episcopal Church†		1478	3 S. Randolph St. 31°27′44″N 100°26′27″W	San Angelo	1967	Harris & Randolf St., San Angelo
Enlisted Men's Barracks #1⁂#		14716	630 S. Oakes St. 31°27′17″N 100°25′51″W	San Angelo	1962	
Enlisted Men's Barracks #2⁂#		15603	E. Ave. C between S. Oakes St. and Burgess St. 31°27′17″N 100°25′49″W	San Angelo	1962	
Enlisted Men's Barracks, # 5⁂#		1487	E. Ave. C between S. Oakes St. and Burgess St. 31°27′18″N 100°25′44″W	San Angelo	1962	Fort Concho, 2nd Building, West from corner of Burgess & Ave C, San Angelo
Enlisted Men's Barracks, # 6⁂#		1486	E. Ave. C at Burgess St. 31°27′18″N 100°25′42″W	San Angelo	1962	Corner of Ave C and Burgess St. San Angelo
Fred Beck Homestead†		2056	1231 Culberson St. 31°27′44″N 100°25′3″W	San Angelo	1989	1231 Culberson, San Angelo
Maier House, The		5375	Relocated to Arden, Irion Co.	San Angelo	1978	moved from 437 West Twohig, San Angelo after 1983
Municipal Swimming Pool†	More images	3536	18 E. Ave. A 31°27′24″N 100°25′59″W	San Angelo	1989	18 E. Avenue A, San Angelo
Officers' Quarters #2⁂#		15354	115 E. Ave. D 31°27′12″N 100°25′51″W	San Angelo	1962	
Officers' Quarters #4⁂#		14073	201 E. Ave. D 31°27′12″N 100°25′49″W	San Angelo	1963	
Officers' Quarters #8⁂#		14203	301 E. Ave D 31°27′12″N 100°25′45″W	San Angelo	1962	
Officers Quarters No. 2⁂#		3673	115 E. Ave. D 31°27′12″N 100°25′51″W	San Angelo	1962	115 East Avenue D, San Angelo 2nd building from West end of Officers Row.
Officers Quarters No. 4, Fort Concho, Texas (missing)⁂#		3676	201 E. Ave. D 31°27′12″N 100°25′49″W	San Angelo	1962	201 East Avenue D, San Angelo, Texas.
Officers Quarters No. 8, Fort Concho, Texas.⁂#		3675	301 E. Ave D 31°27′12″N 100°25′45″W	San Angelo	1962	Building on North one-half of Lot No. 8, Block 55, Fort Concho Addition, City of San Angelo
Orient-Santa Fe Depot†	More images	15218	700 S. Chadbourne St. 31°27′14″N 100°26′5″W	San Angelo	2008	
Schwartz & Raas and San Angelo National Bank Building†		4611	20-26 E. Concho Ave. 31°27′38″N 100°26′3″W	San Angelo	1981	20-26 East Concho Street, San Angelo

== Travis County ==
Recorded Texas Historic Landmark	Image	Marker number	Physical address	Nearest city	Year designated	Location description
Catherine Robinson House		6431	705 San Antonio St.	Austin	1962	
Walter Bremond Home		6432	711 San Antonio St.	Austin	1962	711 San Antonio (409 W. 8th Street) (Texas Classroom Teachers Association executive offices)
Pierre Bremond Home		6433	402 W 7th St.	Austin	1962	
Eugene Bremond House		6434	404 W. 7th St.	Austin	1962	
John Bremond Jr. House		6435	700 Guadalupe St.	Austin	1962	
Hale Houston Home		6436	706 Guadalupe Ave.	Austin	1962	
Hirshfeld House		6440	303 W 9th St.	Austin	1962	303 W. 9th St., Austin
Hirshfeld Cottage		6441	305 W 9th St.	Austin	1962	305 W 9th St., Austin
Mrs. Alfred Robinson, Sr. Home		4306	404 W. 7th	Austin	1962	
German Free School		12732	507 E. 10th Street	Austin	1962	507 E. 10th Street
Elisabet Ney Home†		13829	304 E 44th St	Austin	1962	Elisabet Ney Museum
The Governor's Mansion⁕		13932	1010 Colorado	Austin	1962	
Beriah Graham House		13926	2605 Salado	Austin	1962	
Jacob Leser Home		14254	3506 West Avenue	Austin	1962	
McNeal Home		14448	706 Rio Grande	Austin	1962	Medallion reported missing Mar. 2010.
Gethsemane Church†		14770	1510 N. Congress Ave.	Austin	1962	Texas Historical Commission offices
French Legation		14828	802 San Marcos St	Austin	1962	
Littlefield Home		14889		Austin	1962	24th at Whitis
TMI Castle		14935	1111 W. 11th	Austin	1962	
Sweetbrush (Swisher-Scott Home)		14936	2408 Sweetbrush Dr	Austin	1962	
Old Land Office Building		15288	108 E.11th	Austin	1962	
Woodlawn		15303	6 Niles Road	Austin	1962	
Wells-LaRue House		14592	4524 Ave F	Austin	1963	
Haynie Chapel Methodist Church		14127	16415 Greenwood Drive	Del Valle	1964	
Onion Creek Lodge 220, AF & AM		14905		Austin	1964	
Fortress Home		15352	1425 Fort Dessau Rd.	Austin	1964	
Millett Opera House		14910	111 E. 9th	Austin	1965	
R. K. Smoot Home		14518	1316 W. 6th	Austin	1965	
Texas State Capitol⁕		14150	1100 Congress Avenue	Austin	1965	Texas State Capitol grounds. 1964 Recorded Texas Historic Landmark as Texas State Capitol, 1976 Official Texas Historical Marker as The Texas Capitol.
Austin Woman's Club		6430	708 San Antonio Street	Austin	1965	708 San Antonio St., Austin
The Johnson Home		6448	404 Atlanta St.	Austin	1966	(American Legion Post No. 76)
Driskill Hotel†		13931	604 Brazos St	Austin	1966	6th and Brazos
Saint David's Episcopal Church†		14196	7th at San Jacinto	Austin	1966	
Swedish Log Cabin		14405		Austin	1966	Zilker Botanical Gardens, Zilker Park
Old Bakery		14949	1006 Congress	Austin	1966	1100 block Congress Ave. Medallion reported missing Nov. 2016.
Rocky Cliff		14979	802 Barton Blvd	Austin	1966	
Neill-Cochran Home		15134	2312 San Gabriel	Austin	1966	
Old Depot Hotel		15476	504 E. 5th	Austin	1966	(Carmelo's, formerly Mi Casa es Su Casa)
Austin State Hospital		15648	4110 Guadalupe	Austin	1966	
Scottish Rite Temple		15644	207 W. 18th	Austin	1967	
Las Ventanas		15110	602 Harthan	Austin	1967	
The Old Zimmerman Home		15021	1600 Peyton Gin Road	Austin	1967	
Seiders Oaks		15302		Austin	1967	Shoal Creek Trail, west of Seton Hospital, near W. 38th Street and Shoal Creek Blvd. -- Seider Springs Park, west side of low water crossing
Millbrook (Roy-Hardin House)		12979	1803 Evergreen Ave	Austin	1967	Austin, 1803 Evergreen Avenue
Scholz Garten		12245	1607 San Jacinto	Austin	1967	
B. J. Smith Property		6439	610 Guadalupe St.	Austin	1968	
I. V. Davis Homestead		14170	1610 Virginia Ave	Austin	1968	
Walnut Creek Baptist Church		15435	12062 N. Lamar	Austin	1969	
Goodman Building		6438	1300 Colorado St.	Austin	1969	
Christianson-Leberman Home		6437	1304 Colorado	Austin	1969	across from State Capitol, Austin (Old John Hancock House)
Old Rock Store		12244	6266 Hwy. 290W	Austin	1970	
St. Charles House‡		14909	316 E 6th	Austin	1971	Contributing property to Sixth Street Historic District
Wahrenberger House		6421	208 W. 14th St.	Austin	1972	
Carrington–Covert House		6423	1511 Colorado Street	Austin	1972	1511 Colorado Street, Austin
Saint Edward's University Main Building		14821	3001 S. Congress	Austin	1972	
Buen Retiro		15258	300 W. 27th	Austin	1972	(Phi Gamma Delta fraternity house)
The Governor Horton Place		15168	6706 Bluff Springs Road	Austin	1972	
West Hill		6458	1703 West Ave.	Austin	1974	
William Green Hill House		6415	910 Blanco St.	Austin	1974	
Brizendine House		6453	507 W 11th St.	Austin	1974	507 W 11th St., Austin
Dawson Stone House		14274	1105 S. Lamar	Austin	1974	
O. Henry Hall‡		15479	601 Colorado	Austin	1974	Contributing property to Sixth Street Historic District
Radkey House		15473	3706 Jefferson	Austin	1974	
Gerhard-Schoch House		15632	2212 Nueces	Austin	1974	
Claudia Taylor Johnson Hall‡		14916	210 W. 6th	Austin	1974	(1912 U. S. Post Office)
Esperanza School Building		14956		Austin	1974	Zilker Botanical Garden, Zilker Park
Hotel Provident & Heierman Bldg.		14733	115-117 E. 5th	Austin	1974	
Henry G. Madison Cabin		14700	2300 Rosewood Ave	Austin	1974	Rosewood Park
Donnan-Hill House		12326	2528 Tanglewood Trail	Austin	1975	
Smith-Clark-Smith House		6419	504 W. 14th St.	Austin	1975	
Emma West Flats		6451	511 West 7th	Austin	1976	511 West 7th, Austin
Green Pastures		6444	811 W Live Oak	Austin	1976	811 W. Live Oak, Austin
Paramount Theater		14684	713 N. Congress	Austin	1976	
West-Bremond Cottage		14858	607 Nueces	Austin	1976	
Paggi Carriage Shop‡		15638	421 E. 6th	Austin	1976	
Walter Tips House		13775	2336 S. Congress Ave.	Austin	1976	2336 S. Congress Ave.
Southwestern Telegraph & Telephone Bldg.		14090	410 Congress	Austin	1977	
Saint Mary's Cathedral		14676	201 E. 10th	Austin	1977	
Mary Street Stone House		6445	1001 W Mary St.	Austin	1978	
Denny-Holliday House		14668	1803 West Avenue	Austin	1978	
Thompson Home		14898	1171 San Bernard	Austin	1978	(Zeta Phi Beta sorority)
Jeremiah Hamilton House		14209	1101 Red River	Austin	1978	
Boardman-Webb House		14502	602 W. 9th	Austin	1979	
Moore's Crossing Bridge‡		14007		Austin	1980	Richard Moya Park, Burleson Road; Contributing structure to the Moore's Crossing Historic District
Michael Paggi House		14112	200 Lee Barton Drive	Austin	1980	
Walter Tips Company Building, The‡		13774	710-712 S. Congress Ave.	Austin	1980	Contributing property to Congress Avenue Historic District
Gilfillan House		14373	603 W. 8th	Austin	1981	
Brueggemann-Sandbo House		15080	200 E. 30th Street	Austin	1981	
Hugh B. Hancock House		6457	1717 West Ave.	Austin	1981	
Mauthe-Myrick Mansion		6420	408 W. 14th St.	Austin	1981	
Fischer House		6452	1008 West Ave.	Austin	1982	
George W. Sampson Home		2162	1003 Rio Grande St.	Austin	1982	
Bloor House		15114	10 Lexington St	Manor	1982	
Platt-Simpson Building‡		14334	310 E. 6th	Austin	1982	Contributing property to Sixth Street Historic District
The Shipe House		14361	3816 Avenue G	Austin	1982	
Jacob Larmour House		14246	1711 Rio Grande	Austin	1982	
Sampson Building		14087	618-622 Congress Ave	Austin	1982	
Openheimer-Montgomery Building		14111	105-109 W 8th	Austin	1983	
E. H. Carrington Grocery Store and Lyons Hall‡		14345	522 E. 6th	Austin	1983	Contributing property to Sixth Street Historic District
J. L. Buaas Building‡		14635	407 E. 6th St	Austin	1983	Contributing property to Sixth Street Historic District
Okewell		14748	1505 Windsor Road	Austin	1983	
Hofheintz-Reissig Store		14765	600 E 3rd St	Austin	1983	
Barr Mansion		15620	10463 Sprinkle Road	Austin	1983	
Laguna Gloria		6472	3809 W 35th Street	Austin	1983	just west of Loop 1
Daniel H. Caswell House		6454	1404 West Avenue	Austin	1984	
Moore-Flack House		12243	901 Rio Grande	Austin	1984	
John M. King Log House		14429		Austin	1984	Off FM 2769, Cypress Creek in Twin Creeks subdivision, overlooking the golf course. Limited public access
The Academy		14493	400 Academy Drive	Austin	1985	
William Pfluger Home		16221	1512 E Pflugerville Pkwy	Pflugerville	1985	N of E. Pflugerville Pkwy, between Mammoth Cave Blvd. and Dessau Rd.
The Texas Federation of Women's Clubs Headquarters		6460	2313 San Gabriel St.	Austin	1986	
Robinson–Macken House		4309	702 Rio Grande St.	Austin	1986	702 Rio Grande St., Austin
Reuter House		14457	806 Rosedale Terrace	Austin	1986	
Kuempel Home		15517	16900 Cameron Road	Pflugerville	1987	
Herblin - Shoe House		6459	712 W. 16th St.	Austin	1987	
Southgate–Lewis House		15230	1501 E. 12th	Austin	1988	
Kopperl House		13941	4212 Avenue F	Austin	1989	
Kappa Kappa Gamma House		14452	2001 University	Austin	1989	
Goodall Wooten House		6455	1900 Rio Grande	Austin	1990	1900 Rio Grande
Ashford McGill House (Zilker Park Refectory)		6442	2416 Barton Springs Rd.	Austin	1990	Austin Nature Center, Zilker Park
J. Frank Dobie House		14242	702 E. 26th	Austin	1991	
Moore-Hancock Farmstead		15032	4811 Sinclair Ave	Austin	1992	
1933 Austin Public Library		6425	810 Guadalupe St.	Austin	1993	810 Guadalupe St., Austin
Randerson-Lundell Building‡		13859	701 E 6th St	Austin	1994	
Elvira T. Manor Davis House		15042	4112 Avenue B	Austin	1994	
Keith House		14569	2400 Harris Blvd	Austin	1994	
Pemberton Castle (Fisher-Gideon House)		14290	1415 Woolridge	Austin	1996	
Hodnette House		12242	4300 Avenue F	Austin	1998	
Addcox House		12238	900 E 37th St	Austin	1999	NE corner of E 37th Street at Red River
Stanley and Emily Finch House		12239	3312 Duval St.	Austin	1999	
Joseph and Mary Robinson Martin House		12793	600 W. 7th St.	Austin	2001	600 W. 7th St.
Scarbrough Building‡		12733	101 E. 6th Street	Austin	2001	Contributing property to Sixth Street Historic District
Henry H. and Bertha Sterzing Ziller House		12736	1110 Blanco Street	Austin	2001	1110 Blanco Street
Robert S. Stanley House		15037	1811 Newton	Austin	2001	1811 Newton
Edmund and Emily Miller House		12592	910 Poplar St.	Austin	2001	
Williams-Weigl House		12887	4107 Avenue H	Austin	2002	4107 Avenue H
Stephen F. Austin Hotel		13141	701 N. Congress	Austin	2002	
Littlefield Building‡		12734	601 N. Congress	Austin	2002	Contributing property to Sixth Street Historic District
Penn and Nellie Wooldridge House		14313	3124 Wheeler St.	Austin	2003	3124 Wheeler St.
Philquist-Wood House		15196	4007 Avenue G	Austin	2003	
Buddington-Benedict-Sheffield Compound		13232	500-508 W 34th St	Austin	2004	500-508 W 34th St
King-Von Rosenberg House		13522	1500 Lorrain St	Austin	2004	1500 Lorrain St, at int. of Enfield Rd and Lorrain St., just W of N. Lamar Blvd.
Bohls House		13542	901 Old Austin Hutto Rd	Pflugerville	2005	901 Old Hutto Road
Norwood Tower†		13620	114 W 7th St	Austin	2006	114 W. 7th Street
Mathews School		13654	906 West Lynn	Austin	2006	906 West Lynn
Malcolm and Margaret Badger Reed Estate		13535	2407 Harris Blvd	Austin	2006	2407 Harris Blvd.
Seaholm Power Plant		13974	800 W Cesar Chavez St	Austin	2007	800 W. Cesar Chavez St.
Becker School		13992	906 W Milton	Austin	2007	906 West Milton
Walter and Mae Simms House		14486	906 Mariposa	Austin	2008	
Crusemann-Marsh-Bell House		15716	1509 Marshall Lane	Austin	2009	
J.W. & Cornelia Rice Scarbrough House		16289	1801 West Ave.	Austin	2010	1801 West Ave.
St. David's Rectory		16345	1603 Pearl Street	Austin	2010	
Granger House and The Perch		16353	805 West 16th Street	Austin	2010	805 West 16th Street
Zeta Tau Alpha House		16954	2711 Nueces	Austin	2010	
Matsen House		16803	1800 San Gabriel St.	Austin	2011	
Pease School Building		17181	1106 Rio Grande Street	Austin	2012	1106 Rio Grande Street, Austin
Westgate Tower†		17182	1122 Colorado Street	Austin	2012	
Edward Clark House Outbuilding and Possible Slave Quarters		17293	604 West 11th Street	Austin	2012	
Hezikiah Haskell House		17537	1703 Waterson	Austin	2012	1703 Waterson, Austin
William T. and Valerie Mansbendel Williams House		17589	3820 Avenue F	Austin	2013	in front of home at 3820 Avenue F
Splitrock (Burns-Klein House)		17636	2815 Wooldridge Drive	Austin	2013	
Peter and Clotilde Mansbendel House		17721	3824 Avenue F	Austin	2013	
Helena and Robert Ziller House		17746	800 Edgecliff Terrace	Austin	2013	
All Saints' Episcopal Church†		17873	209 W 27th Street	Austin	2013	
Brown Building		17512	710 Colorado Street	Austin	2013	
McClendon-Price House		17513	1606 Pearl Street	Austin	2013	Southwest corner of Pearl and 17th Streets
Ireland and Mary Graves House		17525	2 Green Lanes	Austin	2013	
Millett Opera House (REPLACEMENT)		14910	110 E. Ninth Street	Austin	2014	
Hancock Recreation Center		17925	811 East 41st Street	Austin	2014	
Cranfill Apartments	18279	18279	1909 Cliff Street, Building B	Austin	2015	
George A. Peterson House		18238	1012 E. 8th Street	Austin	2015	
Downs Field		17811	2816 East 12th Street	Austin	2015	
James M. and Leana B. Walsh House		18400	3701 Bonnie Road	Austin	2016	
Colored Teachers State Association of Texas Building		18401	1191 Navasota	Austin	2016	
Rainey House		18371	3941 Balcones Dr.	Austin	2016	
Sparks House		18370	1510 West Avenue	Austin	2016	
Whitley-Keltner House		18690	200 East 32nd Street	Austin	2017	
Snead-Rieck House		20055	2220 Parkway	Austin	2018	
Pennybacker - Alexander House		20054	811 East 38th Street	Austin	2018	
Carrington Bluff House		20053	1900 David Street	Austin	2018	
Willie Wells Home		23374	1705 Newton St.	Austin	2021	
Broken Spoke		23384	3201 S. Lamar Blvd.	Austin	2021	
Oswaldo A.B. Cantu/Pan American Recreation Center		23617	2100 E. 3rd St	Austin	2022	
Most Worshipful St. Joseph Grand Lodge Masonic Temple		23669	1017 E.11th St	Austin	2022	
Felts-Moss House		23806	2311 Woodlawn Blvd.	Austin	2023	
Johnson & Johnson Grocery and House		23908	1311 East Cesar Chavez St.	Austin	2023	
Elton and Lucy Perry House		24197	610 Baylor Street	Austin	2024	
Donley-Goode-Walton House and Walton's Beauty Shop and Salon		24259	1605 Leona St.	Austin	2024	
Most Worshipful Mount Carmel Grand Lodge A.F.& A.M.		24319	1704 E. 12th Street	Austin	2024	

== See also ==
Recorded Texas Historic Landmarks listed by county
Anderson-Callahan • Cameron-Duval • Eastland-Gray • Grayson-Hudspeth • Hunt-Martin • Mason-Rusk • Sabine-Travis • Trinity-Zavala
