= Pollock–Capps House =

Historic house in Texas, United States

- U.S. National Register of Historic Places
- Recorded Texas Historic Landmark
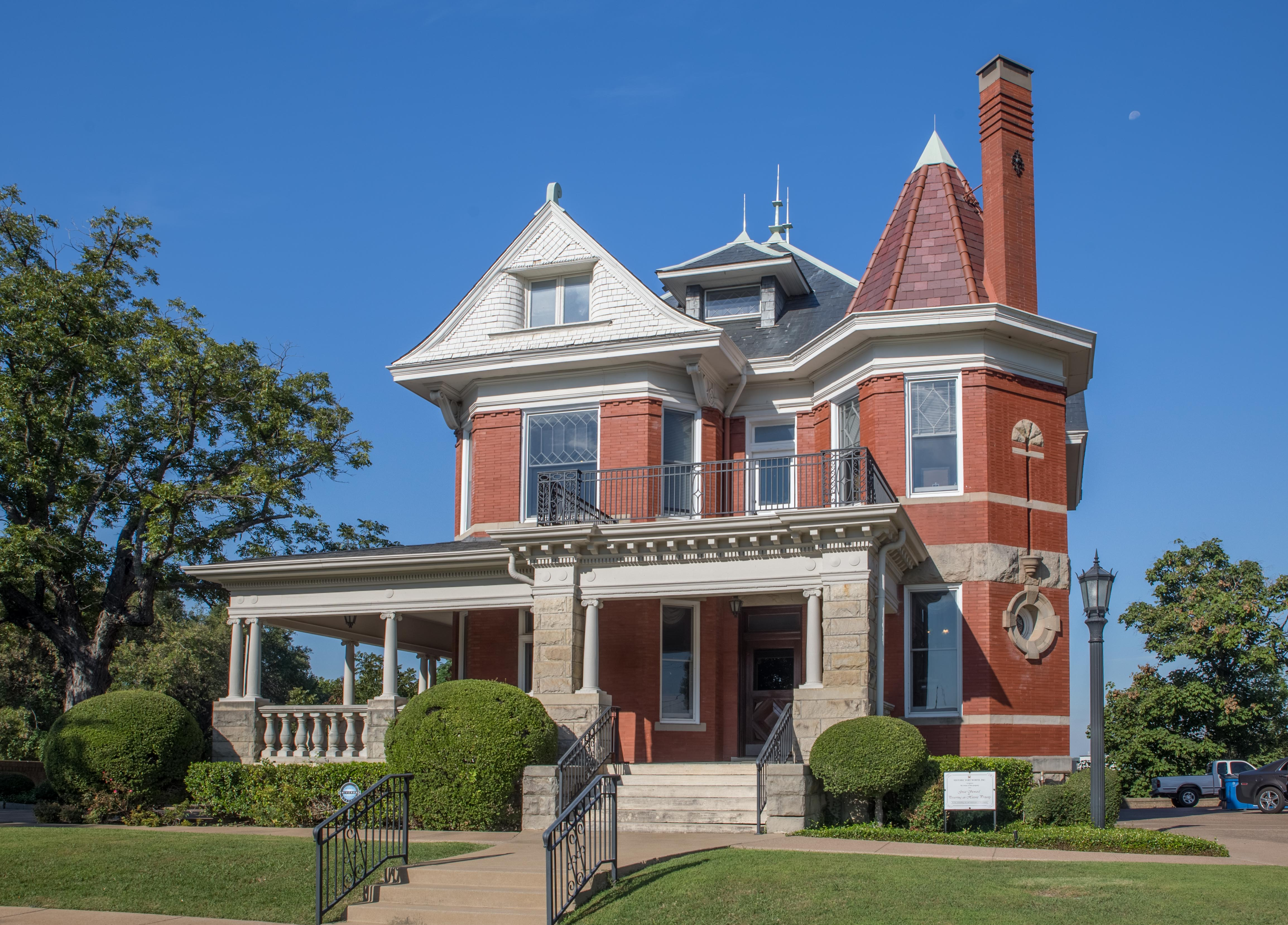
- Pollock–Capps House in 2022

- Location within Texas Location within the United States
- Location: 1120 Penn Street, Fort Worth, Texas
- Coordinates: 32°44′49″N 97°20′33″W
- Area: 0.2 acres (0.081 ha)
- Built: 1898
- Architect: Howard Messer
- Architectural style: Queen Anne
- NRHP reference No.: 72001372
- RTHL No.: 4066

Significant dates
- Added to NRHP: June 19, 1972
- Designated RTHL: 1977

Pollock–Capps House is located on 1320 Penn Street in Fort Worth, Texas, next door to the Eddleman-McFarland House. The Queen Anne Victorian style home, located atop a bluff overlooking the Trinity River, was possibly designed by Howard Messer, architect of the Eddleman-McFarland House, and was named after Joseph Robert Pollock, a physician who moved to Fort Worth in 1887. Pollack and his wife Phoebe sold the house to William and Sallie Capps in 1910. William Capps was a distinguished lawyer while his wife Sallie was president of the Fort Worth Kindergarten Association and a Regent at the College of Industrial Arts in Denton. Historic Fort Worth Inc. purchased the house in 1971. Three years later the organization sold the house to Architect Robert W. Chambers.

The house is built of red brick and limestone, and has a slate roof. The house features an octagonal tower on its northeast corner.

== See also ==
- National Register of Historic Places listings in Tarrant County, Texas
- Recorded Texas Historic Landmarks in Tarrant County
