= Blackstone Hotel (Fort Worth, Texas) =

Historic high-rise building in Fort Worth Texas

Courtyard Fort Worth Downtown/Blackstone
- Fort Worth/Blackstone
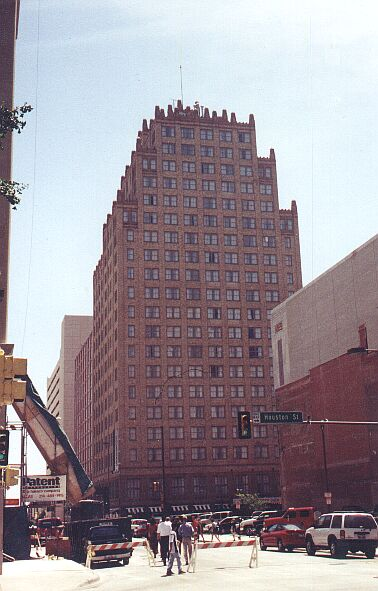
- Blackstone Hotel in 2000

- Location within Texas Location within the United States

General information
- Type: Hotel
- Architectural style: Art Deco, Terra Cotta, Modern Movement
- Location: 601 Main Street, Fort Worth, Texas, United States
- Coordinates: 32°45′13″N 97°19′48″W
- Construction started: 1929
- Renovated: 1952, 1999

Height
- Roof: 82 m (269 ft)

Technical details
- Floor count: 23
- Floor area: 1,262 sq ft (117.2 m^{2})
- Lifts/elevators: 3
- Grounds: less than one acre

Design and construction
- Architect: Mauran, Russell & Crowell

Other information
- Number of rooms: 188 rooms 15 suites 2 meeting rooms Corner Bakery Deli; Swimming Pool; Mini Gym
- Blackstone Hotel
- U.S. National Register of Historic Places
- Recorded Texas Historic Landmark
- NRHP reference No.: 84001961
- RTHL No.: 12201

Significant dates
- Added to NRHP: February 2, 1984
- Designated RTHL: 1998

The Blackstone Hotel is the tallest hotel in downtown Fort Worth, Texas, at 268 ft (82 m) tall. Located on the corner of Fifth and Main Streets, it is noted for its Art Deco design with terracotta ornamentation and setbacks on the top floors. The hotel was constructed in 1929 and operated for over 50 years before it sat vacant for nearly 20 years. The Blackstone Hotel guest list is full of notable people including Presidents of the United States: Harry S. Truman, Dwight D. Eisenhower, John F. Kennedy, Lyndon B. Johnson, and Richard M. Nixon. The hotel was also host for a few movie stars such as Bob Hope, Clark Gable, and Elvis Presley. It was added to the National Register of Historic Places (Building #84001961) on February 2, 1984. The building was restored in the late 1990s and is still in use today as the Courtyard Fort Worth Downtown/Blackstone, although it is still known as the "Blackstone Hotel" to those who live in or have ties to Fort Worth.

== History ==
=== Blackstone Hotel (1929-1952) ===
The 23-story, 284-room Blackstone Hotel had its official grand opening on October 10, 1929. The hotel was built by cattleman C.A. "Gus" O'Keefe and designed by architects Mauran, Russell & Crowell from St. Louis; the contractors were Bellows and Marclay. Famed Fort Worth resident Amon G. Carter was the first guest of the new Blackstone Hotel. Sid Richardson had a penthouse in the Blackstone for $750 a month from 1929 to 1932.

The Blackstone was the first skyscraper in Fort Worth to embrace Art Deco architectural elements. The structure was built with reinforced concrete, and the exterior boasted buff color brick with terracotta ornament throughout. The ground floor facade is faced with Minnesota granite. The setbacks on the top floors allowed private outdoor terraces for guests. The interior showcased a two-story lobby with a mezzanine, wide stairwells, a Venetian ballroom, and Italian marble placed on pillars and floors throughout.

Fort Worth's first radio station, WBAP, was based out of the Blackstone Hotel in the mid-1930s. Although initially leased to the Blue Bonnet Hotel Company, the building was initially managed by Wallace N. Robinson Hotels Company and taken over by H. Fuller Stevens, of Dallas, in 1946. It was in the Blackstone's Venetian Ballroom that the Texas Democratic Executive Committee met in September 1948 to determine if Lyndon B. Johnson's narrow victory over Coke Stevenson was valid.

=== Hilton Hotel (1952–1962) ===
In 1952, the Blackstone came under the ownership of Conrad Hilton. For the next 10 years, the building would be known as the Hilton Hotel. During that time, an addition was constructed to the south, adding additional ground level retail, a new ballroom, meeting rooms, and a rooftop swimming pool. Interior renovations were undertaken, including closing in the two-story lobby and converting the mezzanine into a second floor.

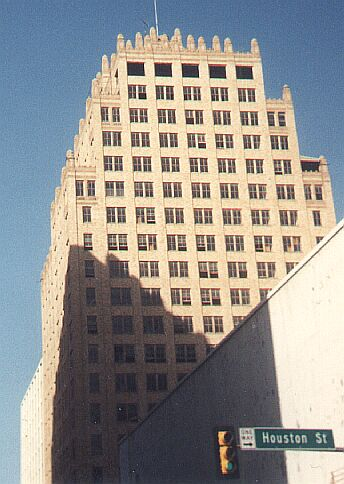
Abandoned Blackstone Hotel in 1990

=== Blackstone Hotel (1962–1982) ===
The Hilton Hotel was again sold, and the name reverted to the Blackstone Hotel. During the next twenty years, the building would fall into a dilapidated state. In the 1970s, the Venetian Ballroom served as a temporary pornographic cinema and Fort Worth police's vice squad made frequent arrests. In 1979 Olympic gymnast Nadia Comaneci described her team's stay at the Blackstone as "awful, terrible, mediocre, but what the hell." The steady decline in business finally forced the closing of the hotel due to bankruptcy of the owners, seeing its last guest at that time in 1982.

=== Vacant (1982–1997) ===
The hotel closed down in 1982, mothballed for almost twenty years. Ground level windows and doors were boarded up, covered by murals painted by local citizens. Many windows in upper floors were broken or opened, allowing rain and birds to enter the structure, causing further deterioration. Windows on the top floor were removed for unknown reasons, and the basement was flooded for many years.

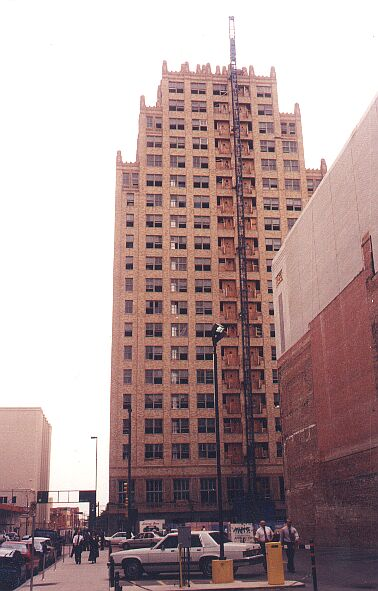
Restoration of the former Blackstone Hotel in 1998

=== Restoration (1997–1999) ===
The Blackstone Hotel building was purchased by Louisiana-based Historic Restoration, Inc. (HRI) for an estimated $2.2 million in 1997, and restoration commenced in 1998. An exterior elevator was installed, and workers converged on the building. The City of Fort Worth contributed 10 years of bed tax to Marriott Corp. in pursuit of restoration.

There are no known original drawings of the interior, so HRI documented every aspect of the building, including measurements of floor-to-ceiling heights and mechanical equipment. Original plaster ceilings found hidden behind suspended ceilings were discovered. The interior was gutted down to the floor plates, stairwells, and elevator shafts. This work included removal of escalators in the lobby and tearing out and replacing all electrical and plumbing. The guest room window frames, made of cypress wood, were restored, and broken glass replaced.

The annex, originally constructed when the hotel was part of the Hilton chain in the 1950s, was converted to an indoor valet parking garage while the top floor hosted additional guestrooms, a swimming pool, hot tub, and a workout room.

The original Italian marble in the lobby was removed during prior renovations, but marble from the vestibule of the Venetian Ballroom was used on the pillars and around the elevators. Moldings were cast of the terracotta above the first floor on the exterior and placed on the top of the columns in the lobby. The exterior was washed and restored to its original appearance. Very little was touched on the exterior due to the building's historical significance. A small set of original terrazzo steps that lead to nowhere remain in the lobby due to their historical significance.

The estimated cost of the restoration was $26 million. Ruth Carter Stevenson, daughter of famed Fort Worth resident Amon G. Carter (first guest of the Blackstone Hotel in 1929), was the first guest of the Courtyard by Marriott Fort Worth Downtown-Blackstone in 1999.

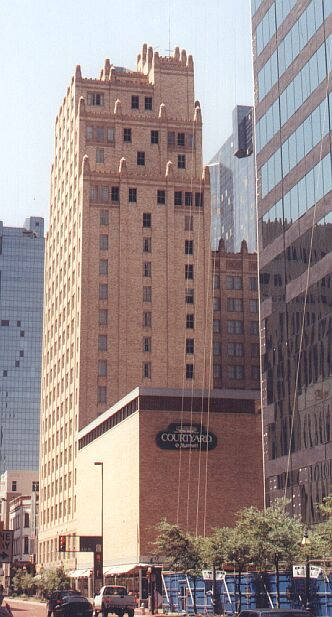
Courtyard by Marriott 2000/2001

=== Courtyard by Marriott Fort Worth/Blackstone (1999–present) ===
The Blackstone was officially branded the Courtyard by Marriott Fort Worth Downtown-Blackstone and reopened to the public on April 7, 1999, offering 203 guestrooms on 20 floors with a Corner Bakery Cafe on the ground floor. Artifacts from the hotel's 70-year history were displayed during its opening on April 6–7, 1999. The hotel also offers meeting rooms (1,262 sq feet), a lobby bar, room service, and internet access.

In 2004–2005, the Courtyard by Marriott-Blackstone received a $1.5 million renovation which included caulking and repainting the windows. Over 2,000 lbs of caulk was used. New furnishings, bedding, and draperies were put in. The hot tub overlooking the swimming pool on the roof of the annex was replaced with a gym.

The Blackstone Building was sold to Austin, Texas-based Summit Hotel Properties in 2017.

== Building owner ==
1929–1946(?) Wallace N. Robinson Hotels Company
1946–1952 H. Fuller Stevens of Dallas, Texas
1952–1962 Hilton Hotels
1997–2005(?) Historic Restoration, Inc. of New Orleans, Louisiana

2017 - Current - Summit

== Hotel managers ==
2018 - 2020 Brian Foose

2020 - Current Jed Wagenknecht

== Structure facts ==
- Address: 601 Main Street Fort Worth, Texas 76102
- Phone: (817) 885–8700
- Height: 268 ft / 82m
- Floors: 23
- Architectural style: Modern Movement
- Constructed with reinforced concrete, terra cotta ornament with Art Deco.
- The top two floors are not public space. They are primarily the crown of the building.
- Developer (1929): C.A. "Gus" O'Keefe
- Architect: Mauran, Russel & Crowell
- Contractor (1929): Bellows and Marclay
- Restoration developer (1997): Historic Restoration, Inc. of New Orleans, Louisiana
- Renovations (2005): Symmetric, LLC
- Constructions and renovations: 1929, 1952, 1997–1999
- Abandoned: 1982–1997
- Hotel names: Blackstone Hotel, Hilton Hotel, Blackstone Hotel, Courtyard by Marriott

== Photo gallery ==
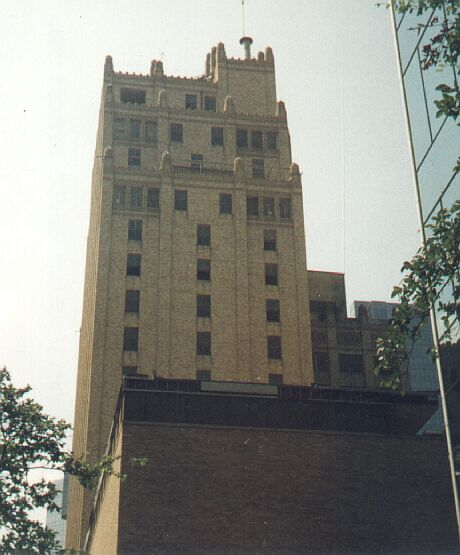
Abandoned (1990)

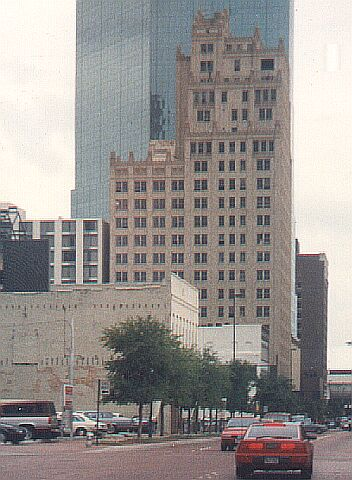
Abandoned (1990)

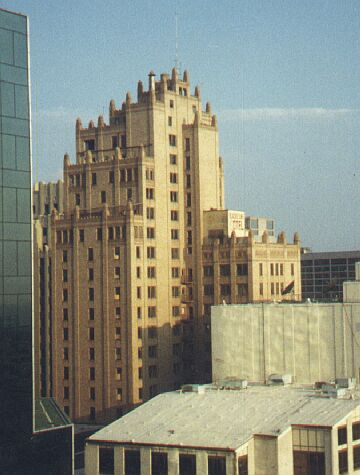
Abandoned (1995)

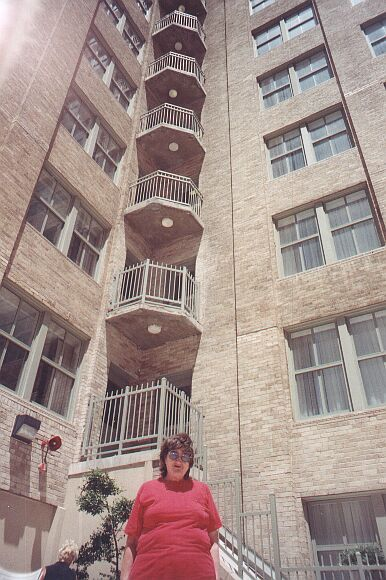
On Patio (2000)

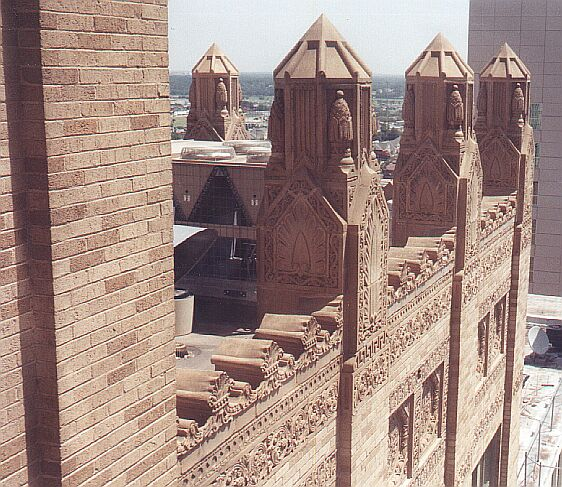
Art Deco on roof top (2000/2001)

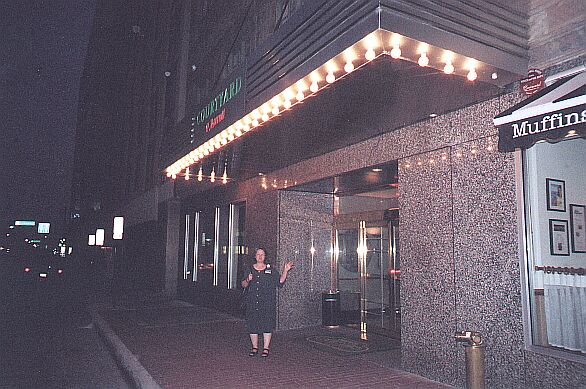
At restored entrance to the Courtyard (2003)

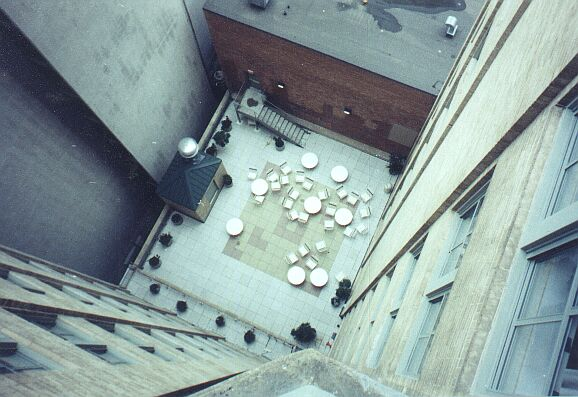
Looking down at patio (2000)

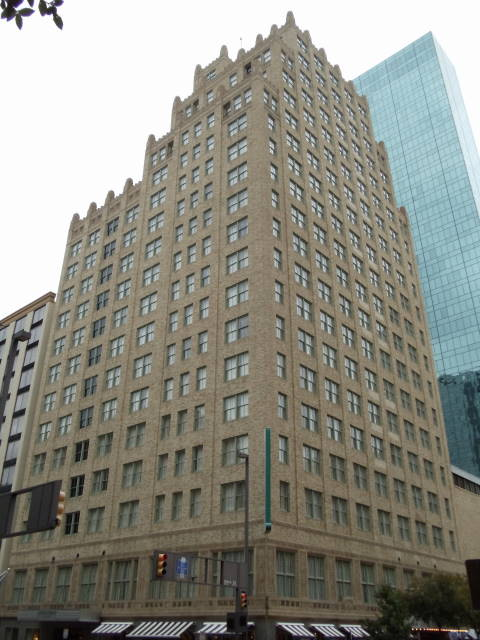
Blackstone (2011)

== See also ==
- National Register of Historic Places listings in Tarrant County, Texas
- Recorded Texas Historic Landmarks in Tarrant County
