= Goodall Wooten House =

Historic house in Texas, United States

- U.S. National Register of Historic Places
- Recorded Texas Historic Landmark
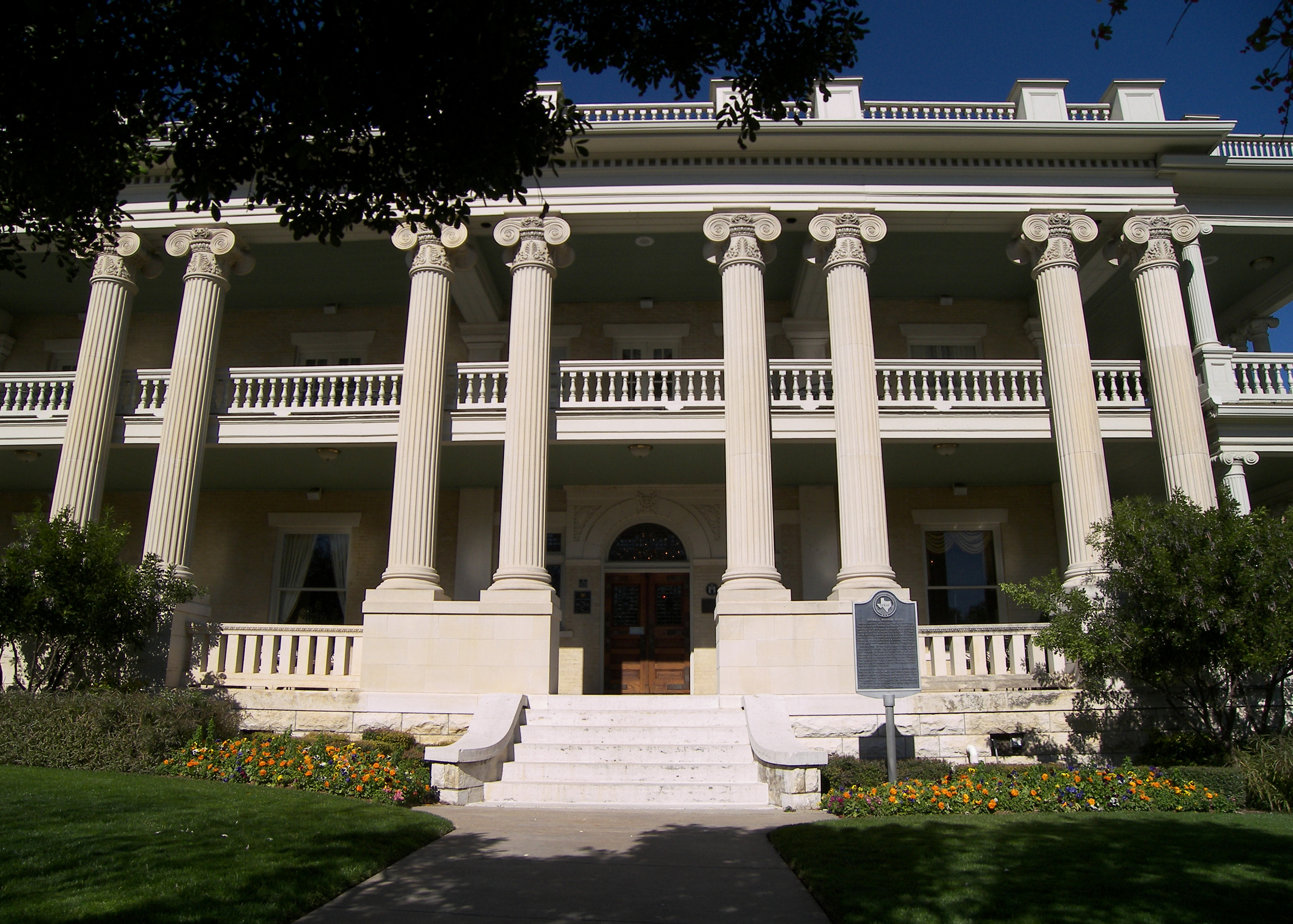
- The Goodall Wooten House in 2007
- Location: 1900 Rio Grande; Austin, Texas, USA
- Coordinates: 30°16′58.8″N 97°44′43.8″W
- Built: 1898-1900
- Architect: Charles O`Connell
- NRHP reference No.: 75002008
- RTHL No.: 6455

Significant dates
- Added to NRHP: April 3, 1975
- Designated RTHL: 1990

The Goodall Wooten House is a historic home built in 1898–1900 in Austin, Texas, USA. It was built by local doctor and benefactor Goodall H. Wooten and his wife Ella and was noted for its Classical Revival architecture and lush gardens. The building has served many purposes since passing out of the Wooten family in 1944, such as a student residence hall, a chemical dependency treatment center, a luxury hotel called "The Mansion at Judges' Hill" and currently, a boutique hotel called "Hotel Ella." The structure was added to the National Register of Historic Places on April 3, 1975.

== History ==
The couple had begun planning the house in 1897, when they were married, and on July 20, 1898, Dr. Wooten and his wife purchased the land where the house would sit from Wooten's father, Dr. Thomas D. Wooten. They lived with Wooten's father while the house was being built and their daughter Lucie was born in her grandfather's home. Construction was completed on January 20, 1900, and the family moved in.

The house has three stories and a basement. The basement had servant sleeping quarters, a game room and storage. The first floor boasted an impressive entry foyer, sitting room, music room, dining room and kitchen. The second floor had four bedrooms, another sitting room, a bathroom and a room for Wooten's extensive gun collection. There was room in the attic for more storage.

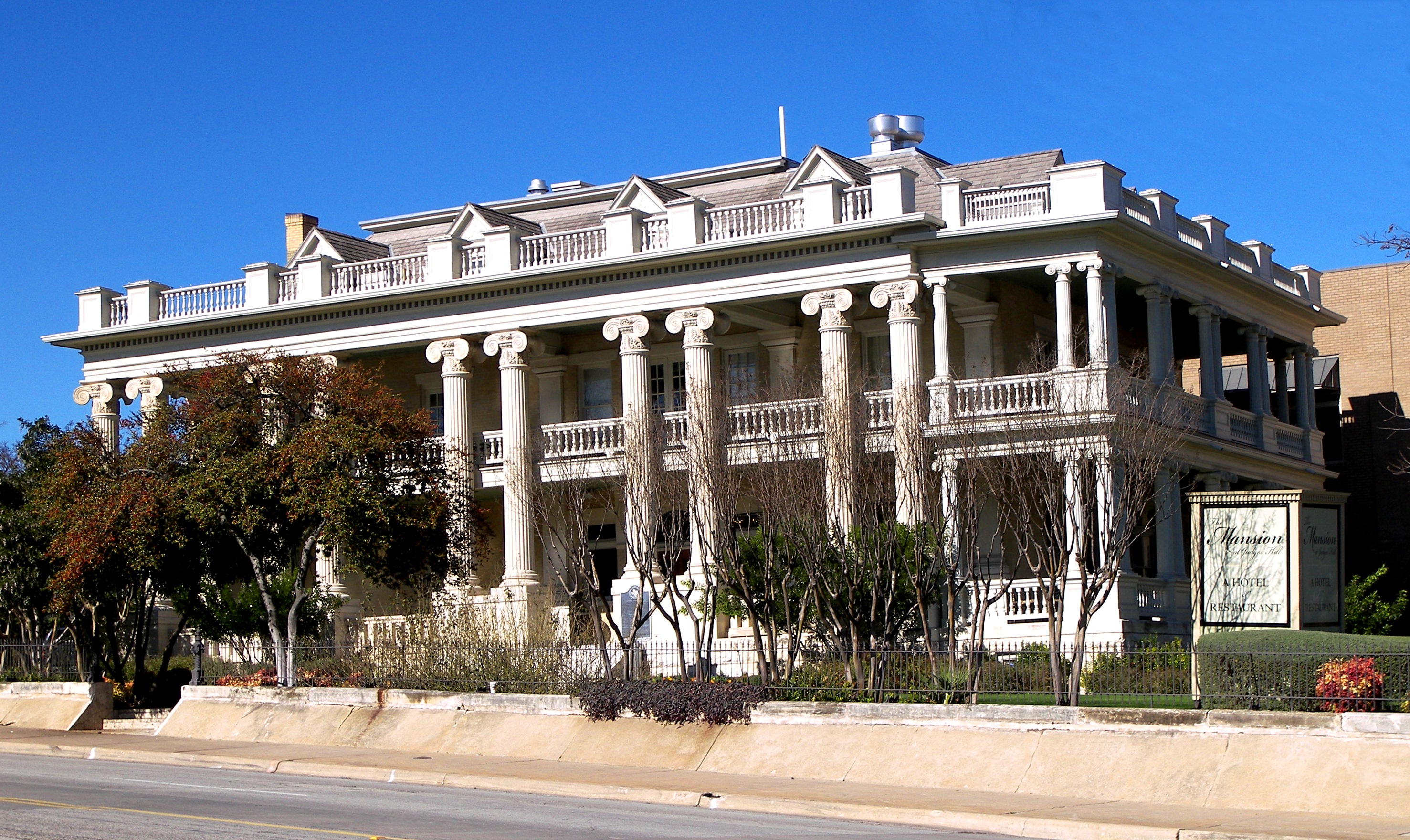
The Wooten house looks much as it did after its renovation in 1910.

In 1910, the house underwent a major renovation and went from a large house to a mansion. The west end of the house was expanded and the lower sitting room was merged into a new library and another bedroom was added. The plain hip roof was replaced and received new dormers. Ella hired Neiman-Marcus to redecorate the interior. It was the first house in Austin the Dallas-based company worked on.

Goodhall Wooten died on January 30, 1942, and Ella became the sole owner of the house. Ella sold the house on June 24, 1944. On October 20, 1953, the property was sold to Christian Faith and Life Community, who operated the house until 1972 as a student residence hall. The house was referred to as Lads House, Wooten House, Wooten Dormitory and Wooten Hall. The building remained a student residence until 1979 under another operator.

The mansion changed purposes on November 15, 1979, when James and Delois Coker bought it and opened the Chemical Dependency Treatment Center of Austin. It served as a drug and alcohol rehabilitation center for twenty years, although the name changed to the Faulkner Parkside Lodge of Austin and then the Austin Recovery Center.

Since 2003, the house was used under the name "The Mansion at Judges' Hill," although technically the structure does not sit in the old Judge's Hill neighborhood. In September 2013, it reopened as "Hotel Ella."

The original address of the house was 700 Magnolia Street. Magnolia Street was renamed 19th Street and then Martin Luther King Jr. Boulevard. The address of the house was reassigned to the cross street Rio Grande (originally called San Bernard) and the current address is listed as 1900 Rio Grande.
