= San Jacinto County Courthouse =

Historic county courthouse in Coldspring, Texas

- U.S. National Register of Historic Places
- Recorded Texas Historic Landmark
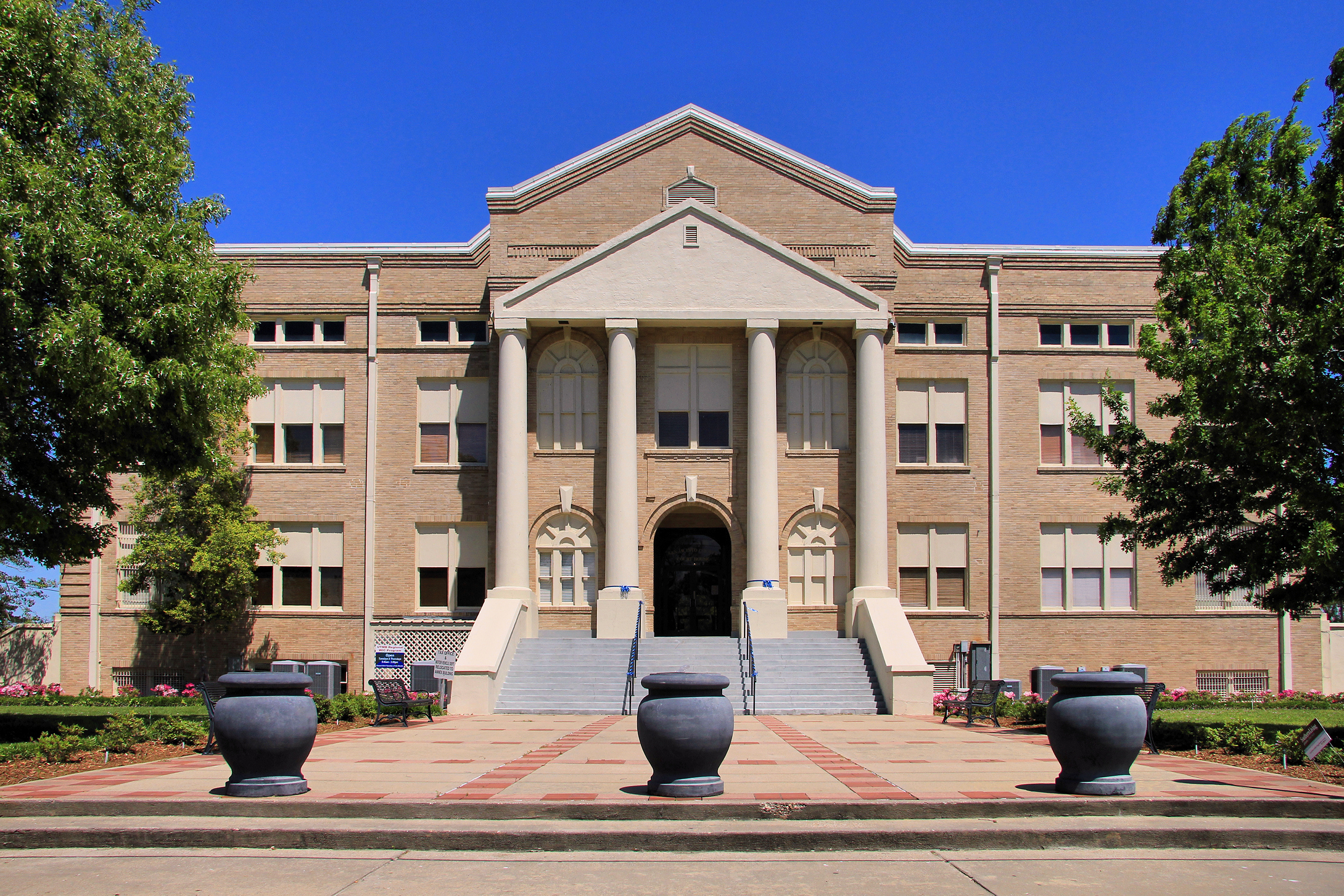

- Location within Texas Location within the United States
- Location: 1 TX 150 at Byrd Ave., Coldspring, Texas
- Coordinates: 30°35′31″N 95°07′42″W
- Area: less than one acre
- Built: 1917
- Architect: Lane, Roy E. & Dowdy, Wilkes A.; Price & Williamson
- Architectural style: Classical Revival
- Website: Website
- NRHP reference No.: 03000332
- RTHL No.: 12481

Significant dates
- Added to NRHP: May 1, 2003
- Designated RTHL: 2000

The San Jacinto County Courthouse is a historic county courthouse in the San Jacinto county seat of Coldspring, Texas. It was designated a Recorded Texas Historic Landmark in 2000 and listed on the National Register of Historic Places in 2003.

== History ==
Coldspring was chosen as the county seat in 1870, and the first courthouse was completed the following year. Built out of wood in a late Victorian style, it sat in the heart of the old Coldspring townsite. A jail was added next door in 1887. On March 30, 1915, a fire swept through Coldspring and destroyed several buildings, including the courthouse. However, all documents had been stored in a brick vault behind the building and survived the fire. The downtown district and buildings, as well as most residents, moved south of the original location. San Jacinto County contracted Houston architects Roy E. Lane and Wilkes A. Dowdy for the designs and Price and Williamson for the construction. Construction began in 1916 and finished in 1917. Bricks made from locally sourced clay were chosen as the primary material. The courthouse underwent a renovation in 1936 but largely remains unchanged from its 1917 appearance.

In 2000, the courthouse was recognized as a Recorded Texas Historic Landmark and received a historic marker. It was listed on the National Register of Historic Places on May 1, 2003.

== Architecture ==
The courthouse was heavily influenced by the Classical Revival architectural movement. A wide promenade and staircases lead up to the front entrance, sheltered by a large tetrastyle portico. The pediment is supported by four Doric columns. Above the front entryway hangs a large cross.

The courthouse building is surrounded by a large square plaza, with trees and pedestrian walkways. In 1976, a wooden gazebo was added to the northwest corner of the lawn, and a veteran's memorial was added to the southwest in 1995.
