= Eddleman–McFarland House =

Historic house in Texas, United States

- U.S. National Register of Historic Places
- Recorded Texas Historic Landmark
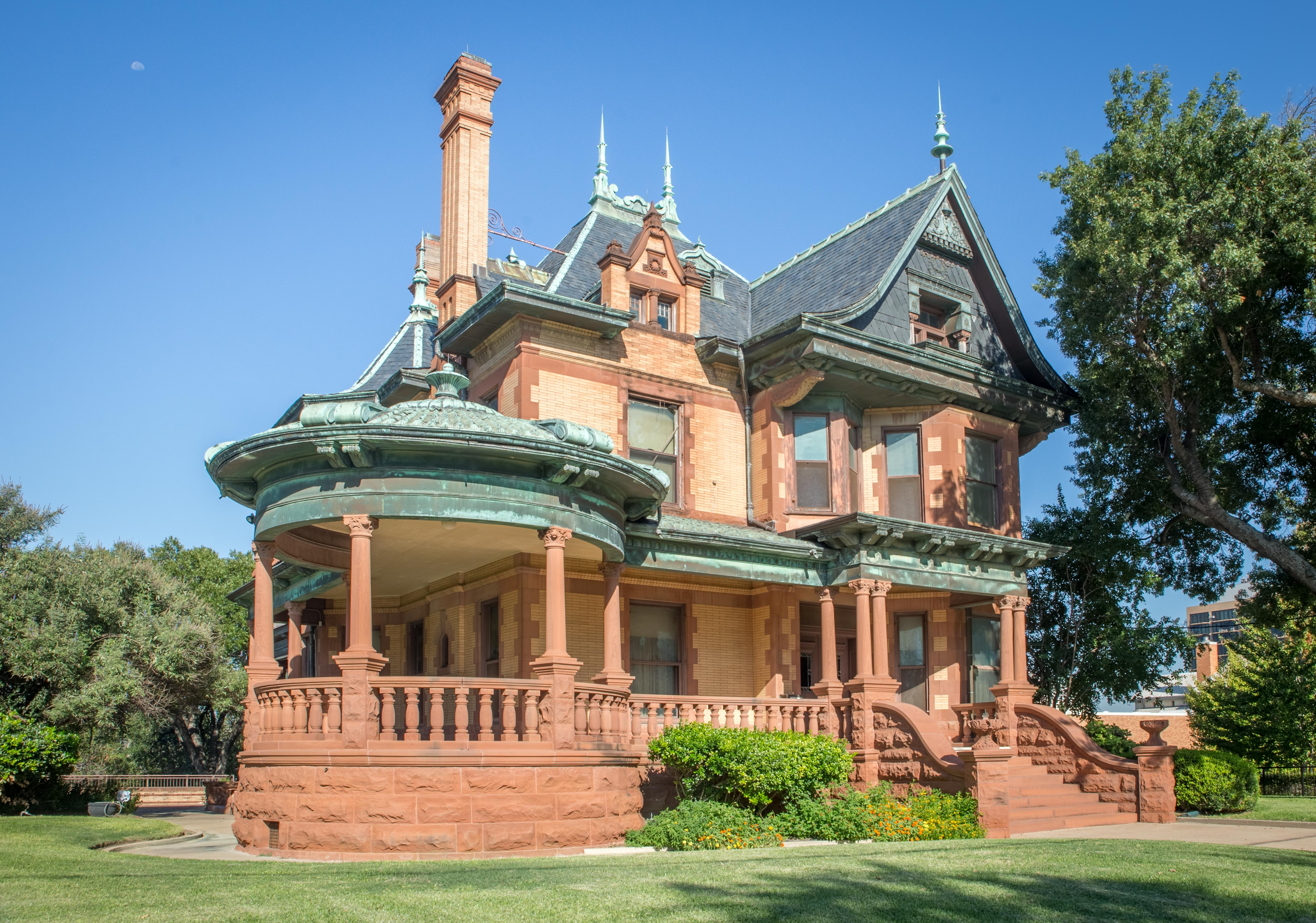
- Eddleman–McFarland House in 2022

- Location within Texas Location within the United States
- Interactive map showing the location of Eddleman-McFarland House
- Location: 1110 Penn St., Fort Worth, Texas
- Coordinates: 32°44′50″N 97°20′33″W
- Area: less than one acre
- Built: 1899
- Architect: Howard Messer
- Architectural style: Late Victorian, Jacobethan Revival
- NRHP reference No.: 79003009
- RTHL No.: 1385

Significant dates
- Added to NRHP: October 18, 1979
- Designated RTHL: 1980

The Eddleman–McFarland House, sometimes known as the Ball–Eddleman–McFarland House or just the McFarland House, is a historic residence built in 1899 in the Quality Hill section of Fort Worth, Texas.

== History ==
The house on the bluff above the Trinity River was built in 1899 in the area then known as Quality Hill. This neighborhood contained many of the large Victorian homes of the "Cattle Baron Families", few of which are still standing. Howard Messer designed the house for Sarah Ball, who died within five years of the house's construction. William Eddleman, founder of the Western National Bank, then bought the house. His daughter, Carrie McFarland, lived in the house until her death in 1978. Eddleman's bank was founded in 1906 and failed in 1913.

The Junior League of Fort Worth bought the house in 1979 and it was later acquired by Historic Fort Worth, Inc. It is open for tours and available for rentals.

== Architecture ==
The exterior of the house is constructed of brick, sandstone, and marble in the Victorian and Queen Anne styles. In the interior are mainly mahogany and oak mantles, cornices, coffered ceilings, paneling and parquet floors.

== See also ==
- National Register of Historic Places listings in Tarrant County, Texas
- Recorded Texas Historic Landmarks in Tarrant County
