= Cobb-Burney House =

Historic home in Fort Worth

Coordinates: 32°44′36″N 97°20′37″W

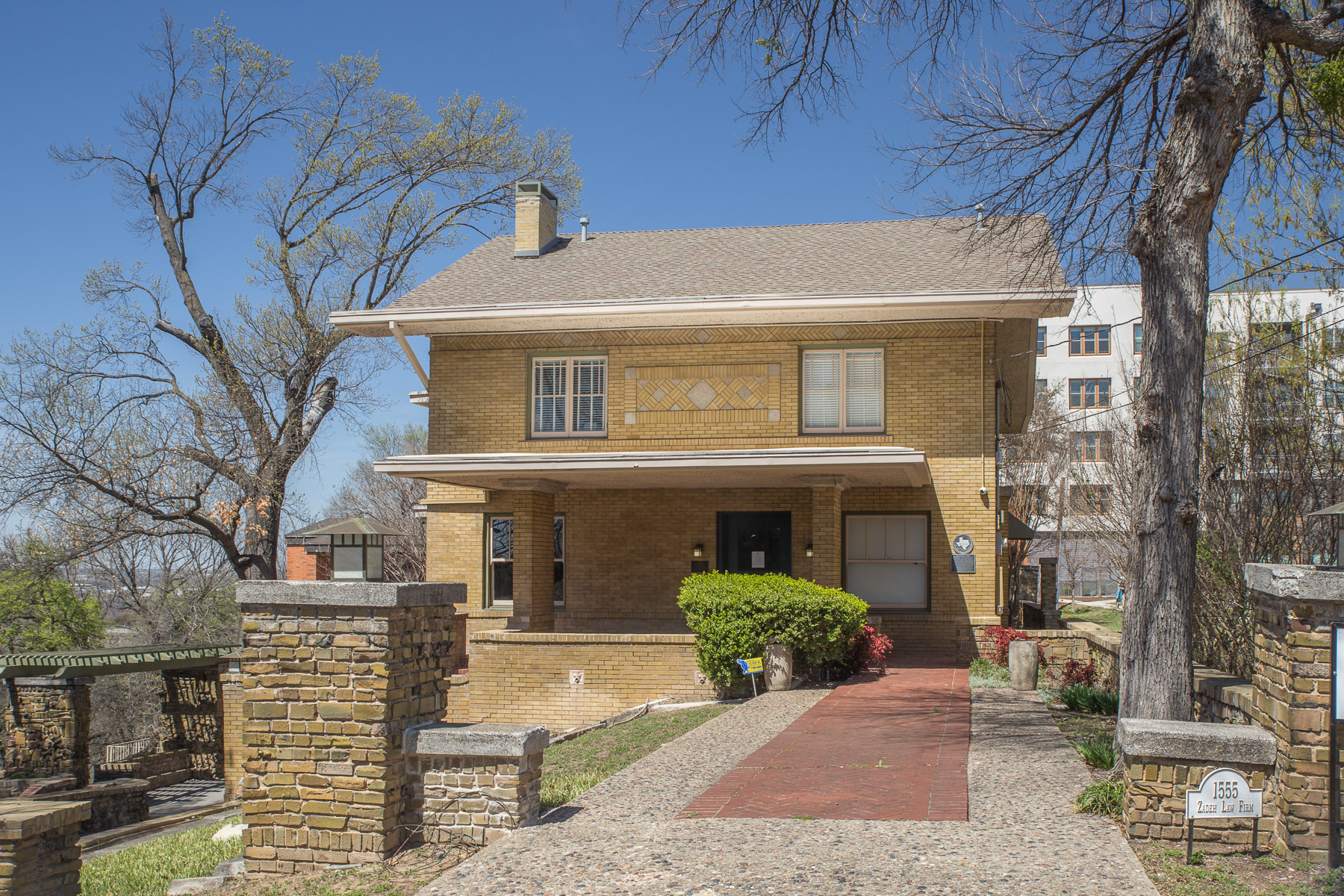
Cobb-Burney House pictured in March 2022

The Cobb-Burney House is a historic home in the Sunset Terrace neighborhood of Fort Worth, Texas.

Built in the Chicago prairie architectural style, the home features wide overhanging eaves, multiple casement window, and a low-pitched roof. The property features a terraced garden sloping towards the Clear Fork Trinity River and Fort Worth's West Side.

== History ==
The Cobb-Burney House was first built in 1904 for W.C. Belcher Land Mortgage Co. president Lyman D. Cobb and his wife, Emma. Lyman died in 1908, and his widow remained in the home until she sold it in 1919 to Judge Ivy Burney. Burney and his wife, Belle, lived there until their deaths in the 1940s and 50s, respectively. The house was again sold in 1956 after Burney and his wife's deaths to architect Milton M. Moseley and his wife Johnie. Ownership of the home was transferred in the late 1960s to the All Church Home, which operated next door. In 1985, the Cobb-Burney House was designated a Recorded Texas Historic Landmark.

After remaining vacant for over 20 years, the house was purchased by attorneys Jamshyd "Jim" Zadeh and Fransisco Hernandez and converted into offices for their law practices.

=== Restoration ===
Zadeh faced a massive restoration project, as both the interior and exterior of the home had significantly deteriorated. Hull Historical, a Fort Worth historical restoration company, used photographs to reconstruct the home's original features, including a pergola, gumwood beams, and windows. New millwork was added, inspired by turn-of-the-century catalogs, and the kitchen is similarly period appropriate, with a 1930s stove. In 2018, Zadeh and Hull Historical CEO Brent Hull were awarded the Preservation Project Award by Historic Fort Worth for "[reclaiming] a deserving historic residence and transformed it into commercial use".

=== Current use ===
The Cobb-Burney Home is currently occupied by The Zadeh Firm, a Fort Worth personal injury law firm specializing in traffic collision, wrongful death, and insurance denial claims. It also houses Texas Mexico Law, the firm owned by criminal law and immigration law attorney Fransisco Hernandez.
