= San Jacinto County Jail =

Historic jail museum in Coldspring, Texas

- U.S. National Register of Historic Places
- Recorded Texas Historic Landmark
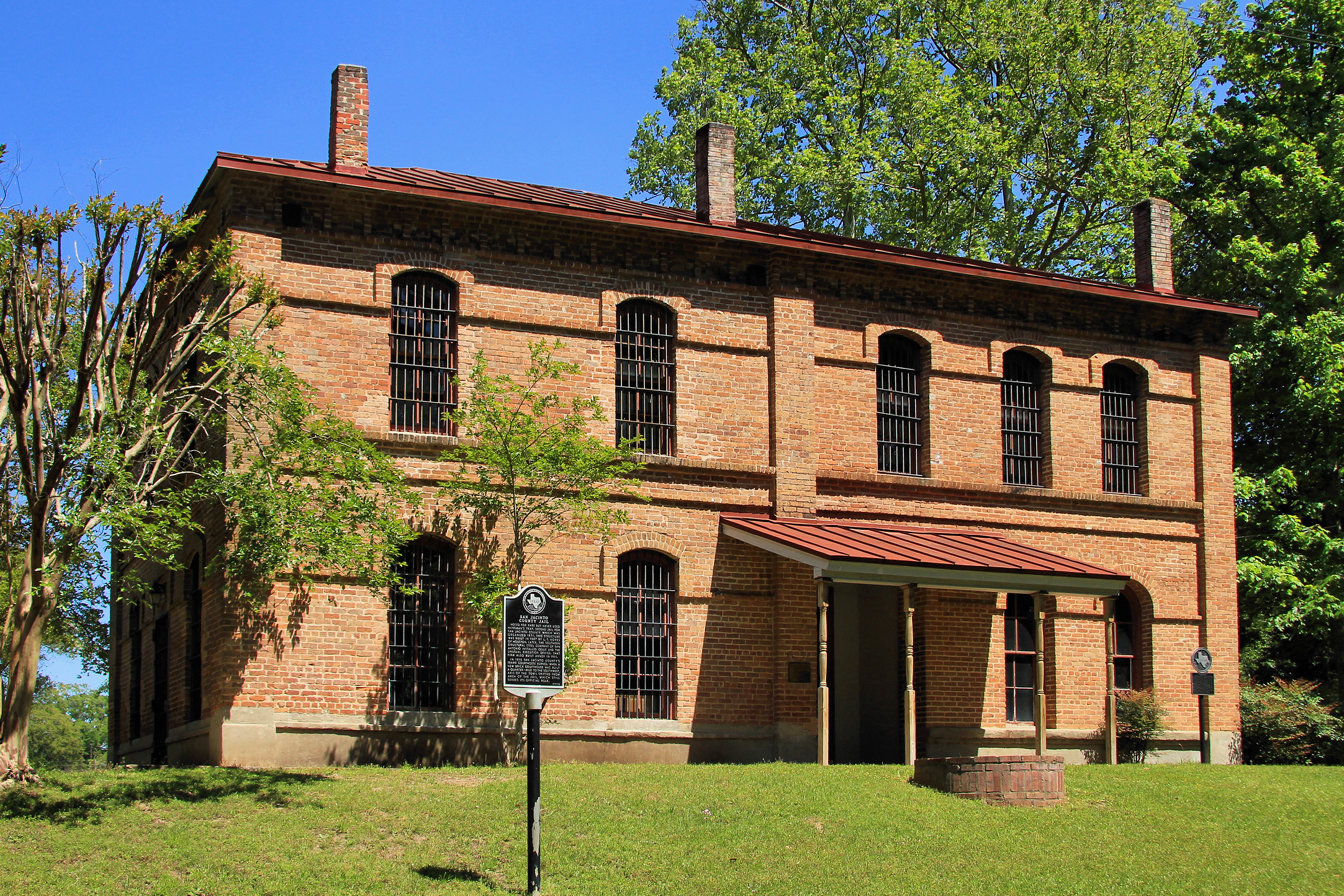
- San Jacinto County Jail, 2014

- Location within Texas Location within the United States
- Location: Commercial Avenue, Coldspring, Texas
- Coordinates: 30°35′46.4″N 95°07′42.1″W
- Built: 1887
- Architect: L. T. Noyes
- Architectural style: Late Victorian
- NRHP reference No.: 80004148
- RTHL No.: 5407007670

Significant dates
- Added to NRHP: July 15, 1980
- Designated RTHL: 1982

The San Jacinto County Jail, also known as the Coldspring Old Jail or San Jacinto County Old Jail Museum, is a historic jail and museum in Coldspring, Texas. Originally built in 1887 and expanded in 1911, it is one of the oldest buildings in Coldspring. It was added to the National Register of Historic Places in 1980 and was designated a Recorded Texas Historic Landmark in 1982. Today, it is the home of the San Jacinto County Historical Commission and is next to Old Town Coldspring, a recreation of some of the settlement's oldest buildings. It is periodically open for public tours.

== History ==
San Jacinto County's first jail was constructed in 1870 out of wood, but as the area grew, the need for a more permanent structure became apparent. The new jail was built in 1887 in the county seat of Coldspring, across from the courthouse in the original town square, at the southeastern corner of Loyd and Slade Streets. As Coldspring grew, it became necessary to expand the court buildings. A records vault was built behind the courthouse in 1895, modelled after the architecture of the jail, and the jail itself was expanded to its present size in 1911. Although the gallows were never used in any official capacity, there was reportedly one incident where a mob broke into the jail and lynched a prisoner.

In 1915, a fire destroyed the original courthouse and several other buildings in the town square; however, because the jail and the records vault were made of brick, they survived. The new courthouse, which still exists today, was built to the south, effectively moving the center of town to that location. By 1923, the old town square had been abandoned. The jail, however, remained and continued to operate until 1980, when it was deemed to have unsuitable conditions, and a new facility was built. The records building was demolished that year. Upon its retirement, the San Jacinto County Historical Commission moved its operations there, where they planned to open a museum and a "vanishing crafts teaching institute". In 1971, the first historical plaque was installed. The jail was added to the National Register of Historic Places on July 15, 1980, for its historic and architectural significance. It was further designated a Recorded Texas Historic Landmark in 1982.

== Architecture ==
The two-story jail was constructed out of yellow-pink brick and was initially a perfect square, measuring 28 by 28 feet (8.5 by 8.5 m) before a 1911 expansion doubled its size and shifted the building's footprint to a rectangular shape. The current front entrance faces west, although the original pre-1911 entrance was on the north side (which then faced the town square).

Its hipped roof is made of corrugated galvanised iron, and there is a matching awning above the front entrance. Just below the roof runs a horizontal row of brickwork cornices. All of the windows are sashed and lined with iron bars, and the tops are decorated by projecting brick arches that end in rowlock courses. These courses run the length of the building and are interrupted only by corner and central columns on the building's facades.

Plaster lined the interior walls and the first floor was made of wood, while the second story was mostly made of concrete. Reception, offices, and the kitchen were located on the first floor, while cells were housed on the second floor. Access to the cells was by a metal staircase. Two fireplaces heated the building, and these chimneys are still visible protruding from the roof.

The gallows and cells were all built by the Southern Structural Steel Company of San Antonio, which also oversaw the 1911 expansion.

== See also ==
- List of jail and prison museums
