= J. Frank Dobie House =

Historic house in Texas, United States

- U.S. National Register of Historic Places
- Recorded Texas Historic Landmark
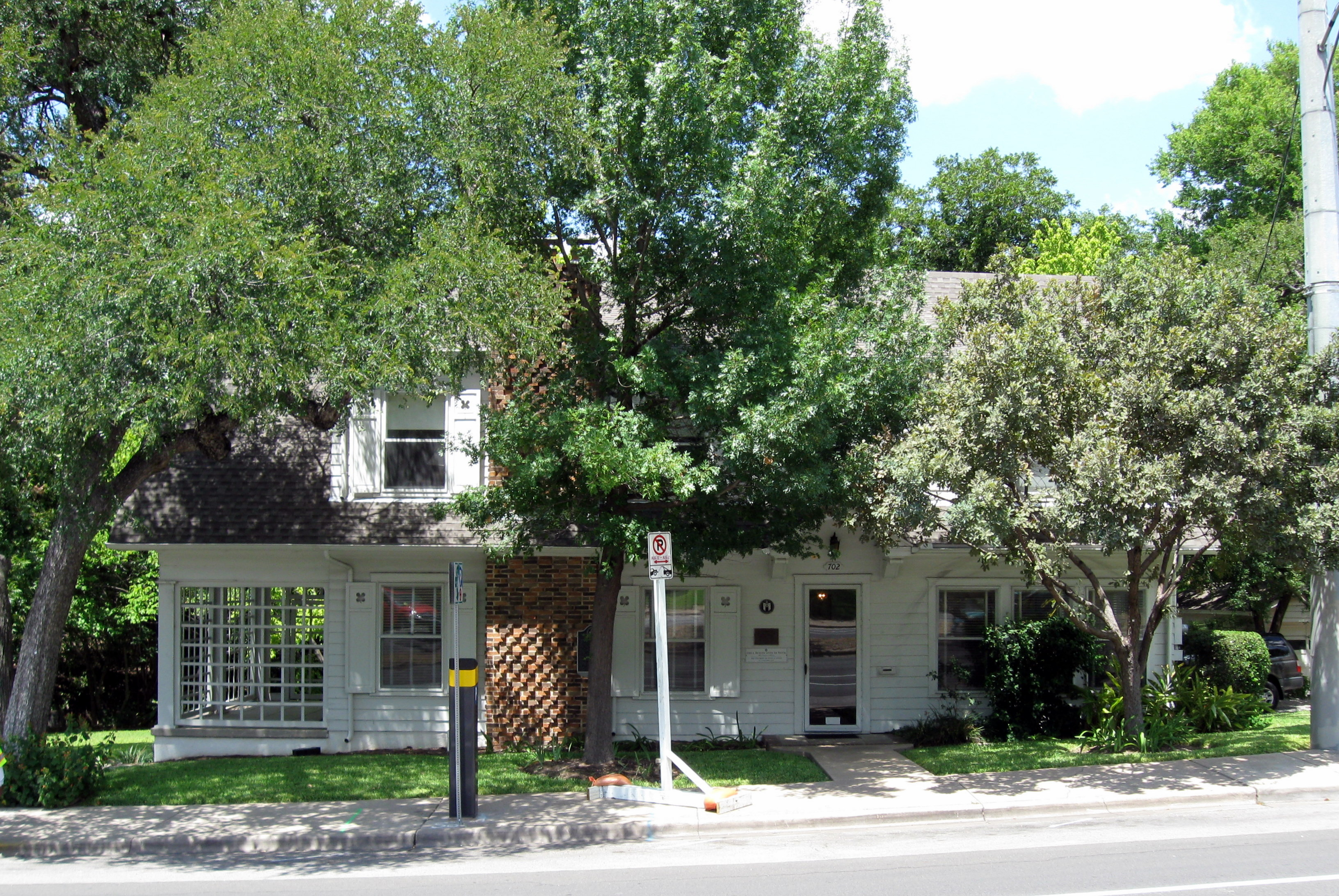

- Location within Texas
- Location: 702 East Dean Keeton Street, Austin, Texas, United States
- Coordinates: 30°17′21″N 97°43′56″W
- Area: 0.9 acres (0.36 ha)
- Built: 1926
- Architects: C.H. Tonngare and Carlton Brush
- Architectural style: Colonial Revival
- NRHP reference No.: 91000575
- RTHL No.: 14242

Significant dates
- Added to NRHP: May 20, 1991
- Designated RTHL: 1991

The J. Frank Dobie House is a historic house in Austin, Texas built in the Colonial Revival style in 1925–26. The house was bought by J. Frank Dobie in 1926, and it contained the library and office where he did much of his writing. Until his death in 1964, Dobie used the house for informal entertaining with colleagues and students. It was acquired by the University of Texas at Austin in 1995, and currently houses the Michener Center for Writers.
