= Robinson–Macken House =

Historic house in Texas, United States

- U.S. National Register of Historic Places
- Recorded Texas Historic Landmark
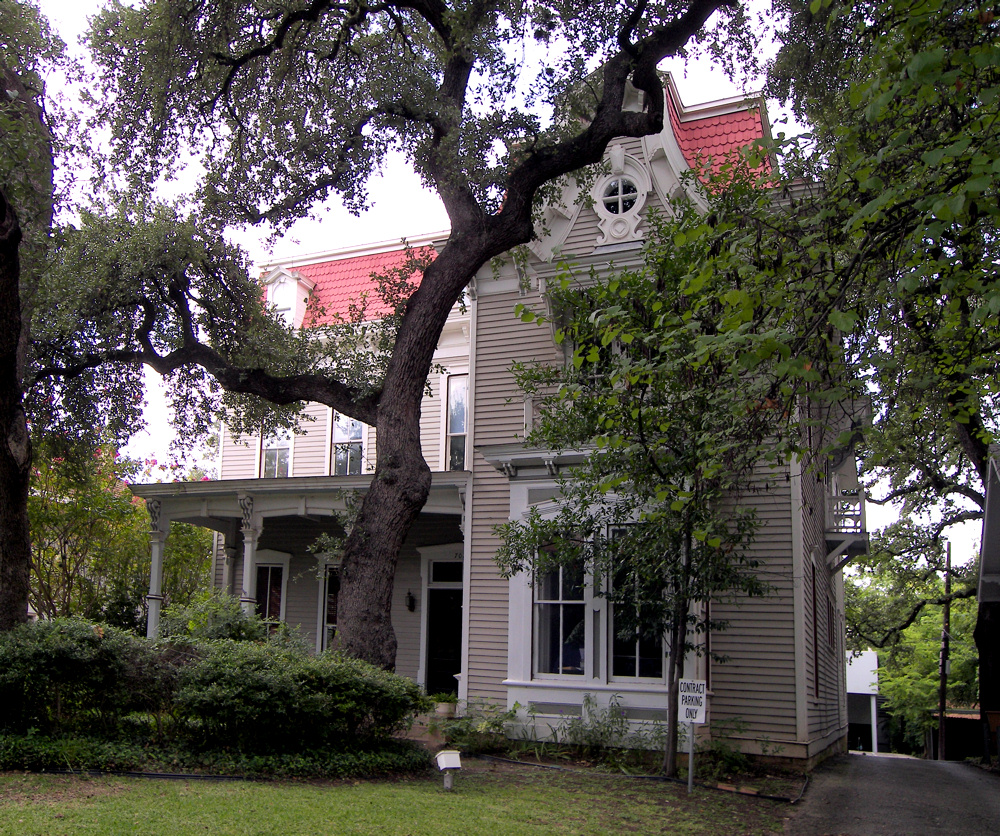
- The Robinson–Macken House in 2007
- Location: 702 Rio Grande St; Austin, Texas, USA
- Coordinates: 30°16′16.75″N 97°44′57.50″W
- Built: 1876
- Architect: Campbell & Deats
- Architectural style: Second Empire
- NRHP reference No.: 85002300
- RTHL No.: 4309

Significant dates
- Added to NRHP: September 12, 1985
- Designated RTHL: 1986

The Robinson–Macken House is a historic home in west downtown Austin, Texas. The home is located at 702 Rio Grande. It was added to the National Register of Historic Places in 1985.
