= Louis and Mathilde Reuter House =

Historic house in Texas, United States

- U.S. National Register of Historic Places
- Recorded Texas Historic Landmark
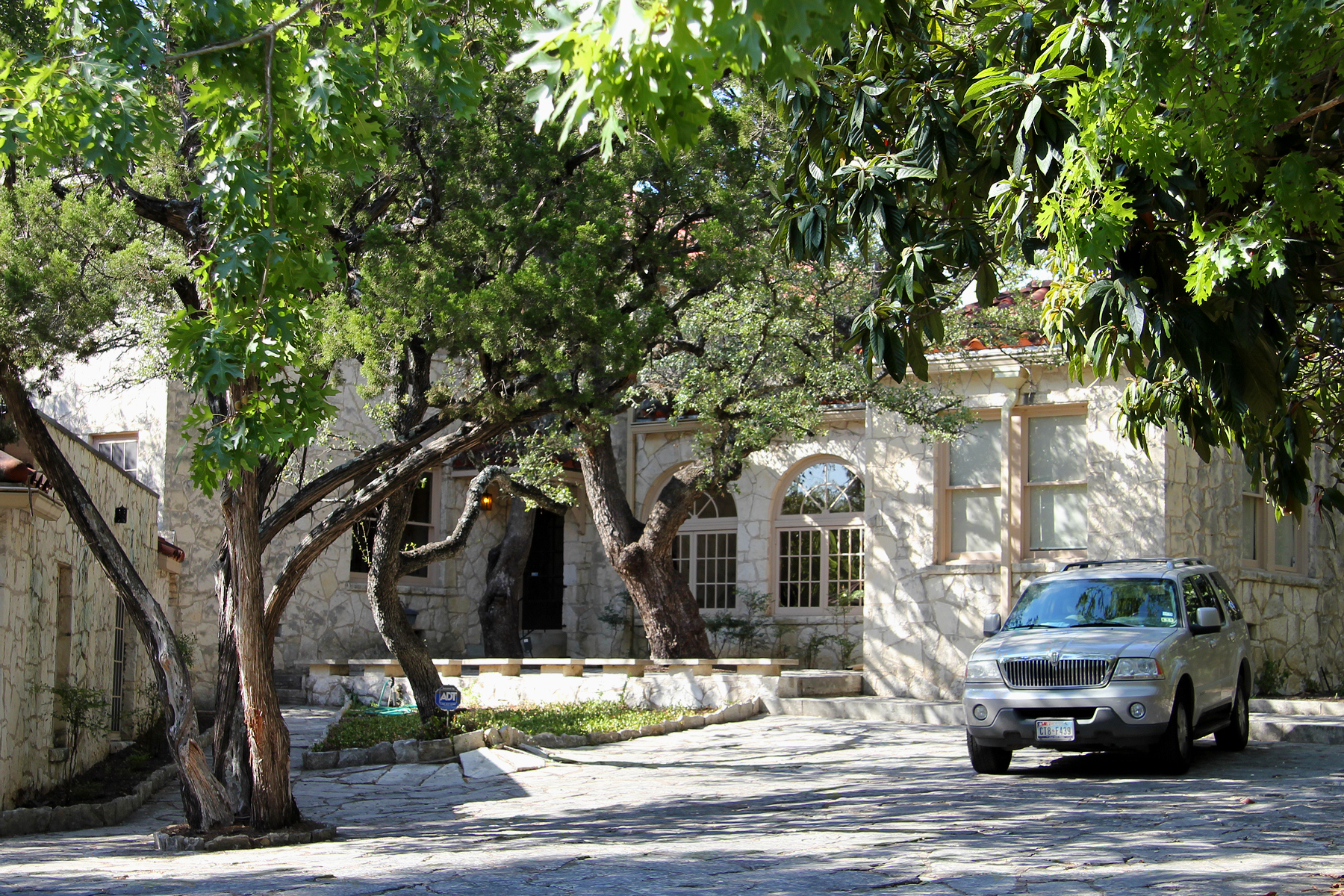
- The Reuter House in 2011

- Location within Texas Location within the United States
- Location: 806 Rosedale Terrace, Austin, Texas
- Coordinates: 30°14′28″N 97°44′40″W
- Area: 1.2 acres (0.49 ha)
- Built: 1934
- Architect: Jones, Thos. D.
- Architectural style: Mission/Spanish Revival, Spanish Colonial Revival
- NRHP reference No.: 87002100
- RTHL No.: 14457

Significant dates
- Added to NRHP: December 7, 1987
- Designated RTHL: 1986

The Louis and Mathilde Reuter House is a private limestone home in central Austin, Texas, United States, in the historic Travis Heights neighborhood. The home was built by Louis Reuter, a local entrepreneur who moved to Austin in 1918 and later opened the city's first self-service grocery store.

The home boasts an unusual U-shaped design that combines Spanish Revival and Mission Revival styling, with Palladian windows. The home was built without a precise blueprint but rather a "footprint" on the property which spared the grandiose old oak trees.

The home is located at 806 Rosedale Terrace. It was added to the National Register of Historic Places in 1987.
