= Ziller House =

Historic house in Texas, United States

- U.S. National Register of Historic Places
- Recorded Texas Historic Landmark
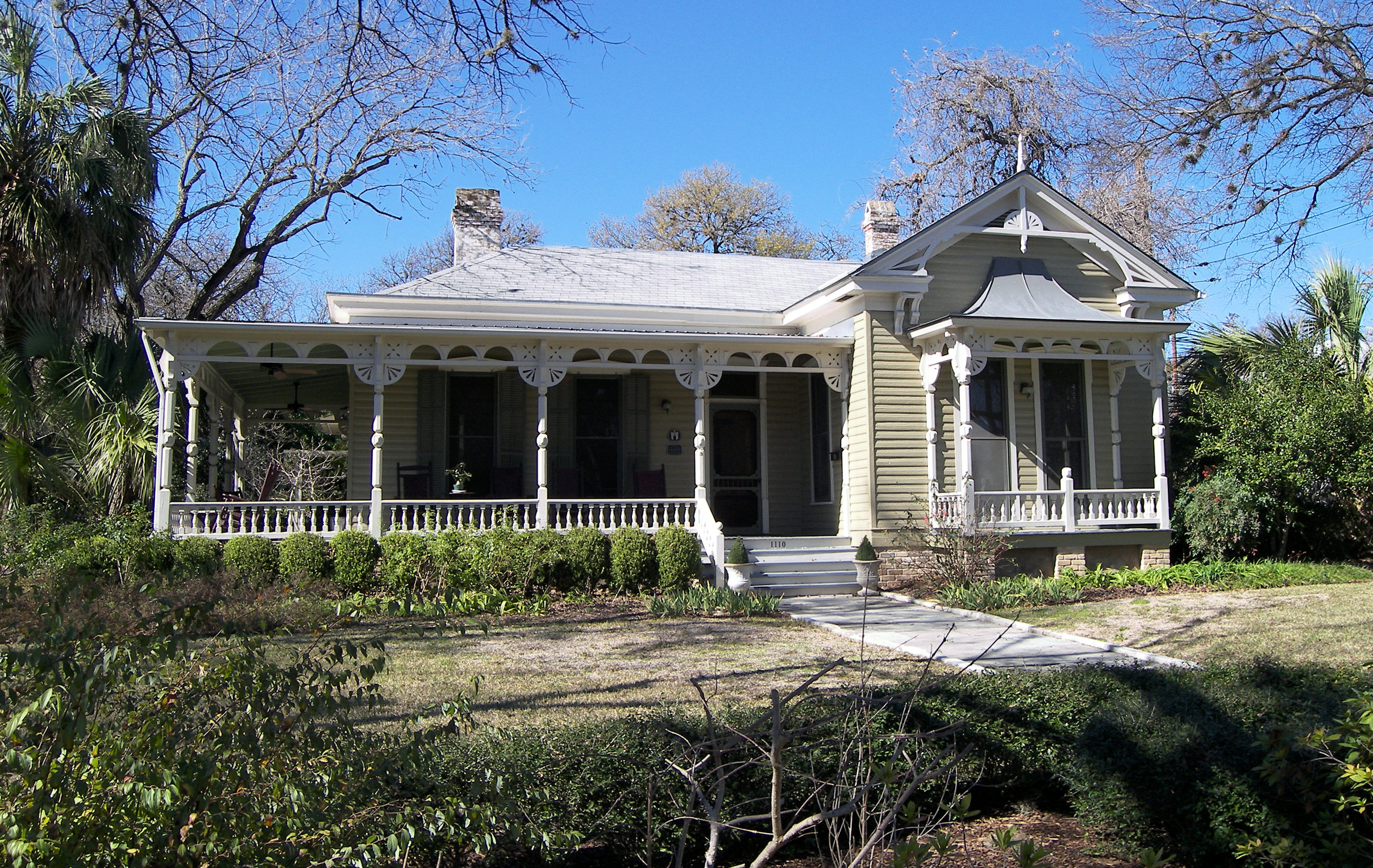
- Location: 1110 Blanco; Austin, Texas, USA
- Coordinates: 30°16′32″N 97°45′14″W
- Built: ca. 1877
- NRHP reference No.: 98000449
- RTHL No.: 12736

Significant dates
- Added to NRHP: May 8, 1998
- Designated RTHL: 2001

The Henry H. and Bertha Sterzing Ziller House is a historic residence in Austin, Texas. It was originally built circa 1877 and purchased by the Zillers in 1881. It was added to the National Register of Historic Places in 1998. It is located at 1110 Blanco St.
