= Brizendine House =

Historic house in Texas, United States

- U.S. National Register of Historic Places
- Recorded Texas Historic Landmark
- Texas State Antiquities Landmark
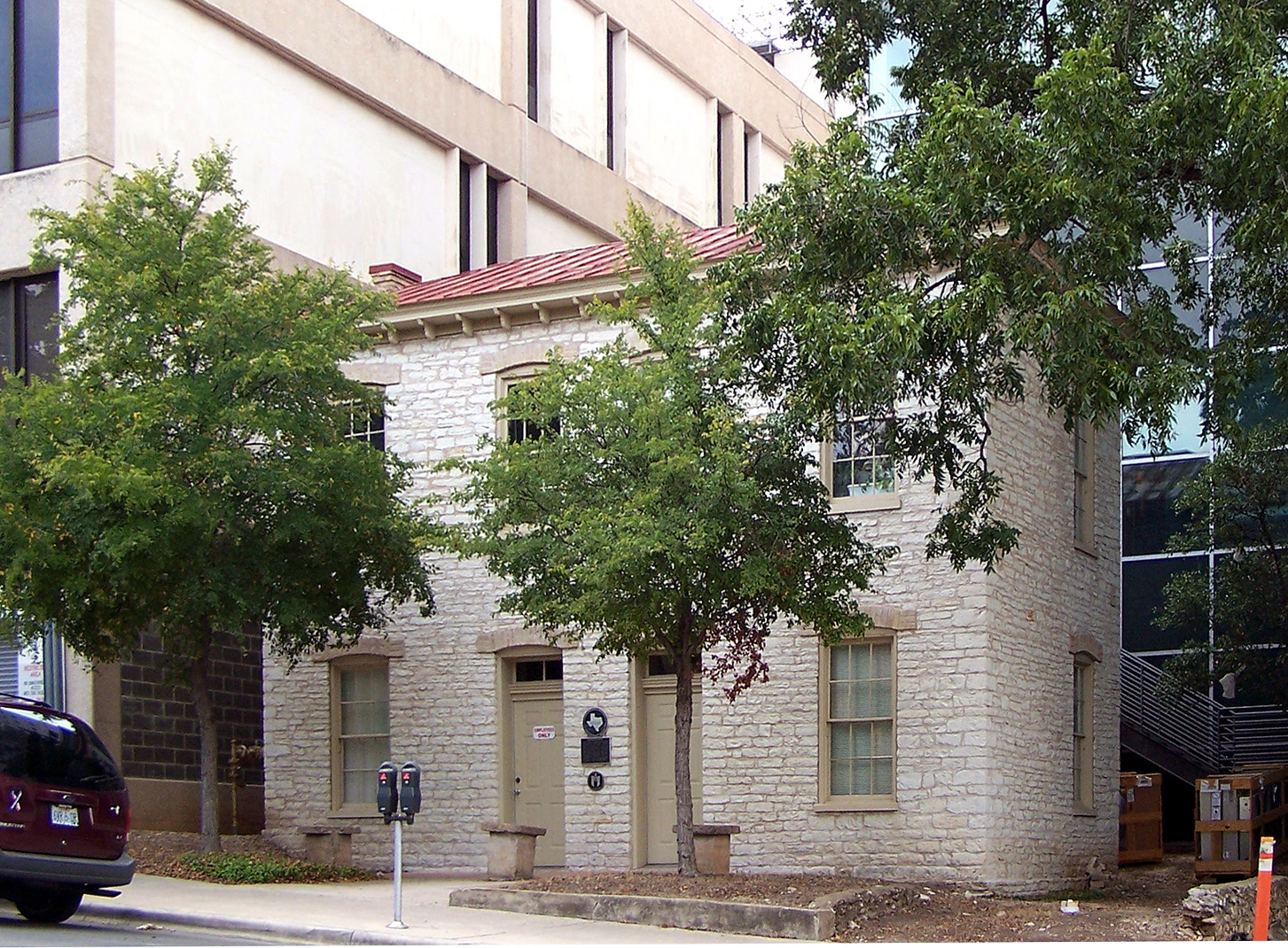
- The diminutive Brizendine House is closely surrounded by high-rise office buildings.
- Location: Austin, Texas, USA
- Coordinates: 30°16′26.76″N 97°44′46.68″W
- Built: 1870
- NRHP reference No.: 74002090
- RTHL No.: 6453
- TSAL No.: 600

Significant dates
- Added to NRHP: July 22, 1974
- Designated RTHL: 1974
- Designated TSAL: 5/28/1981

The Brizendine House is a historic home in downtown Austin, Texas, constructed circa 1870. The building is located at 507 W 11th Street and is today surrounded by an annex to the Travis County Courthouse and the Blackwell/Thurman Criminal Justice Center.

The house was listed on the National Register of Historic Places and designated a Recorded Texas Historic Landmark in 1974. It was designated a State Antiquities Landmark in 1981.

== Texas Historical Commission Marker Text ==
This simple vernacular rough ashlar house represents the life style of the late 19th century working middle-class family in Austin, Texas. The exterior proportions of the structure reflect Victorian influence. Built of limestone about 1870 by John R. Brizendine (1829–1914), an Austin carpenter, machinist, and miller. Brizendine, a native of Kentucky, lived here until his death. Mrs. Elizabeth Gordon bought the home in 1928, and members of her family lived here until 1972. Recorded Texas Historic Landmark-1974
