= 1978 United States House of Representatives elections =

House elections for the 96th U.S. Congress

- November 7, 1978

All 435 seats in the United States House of Representatives 218 seats needed for a majority
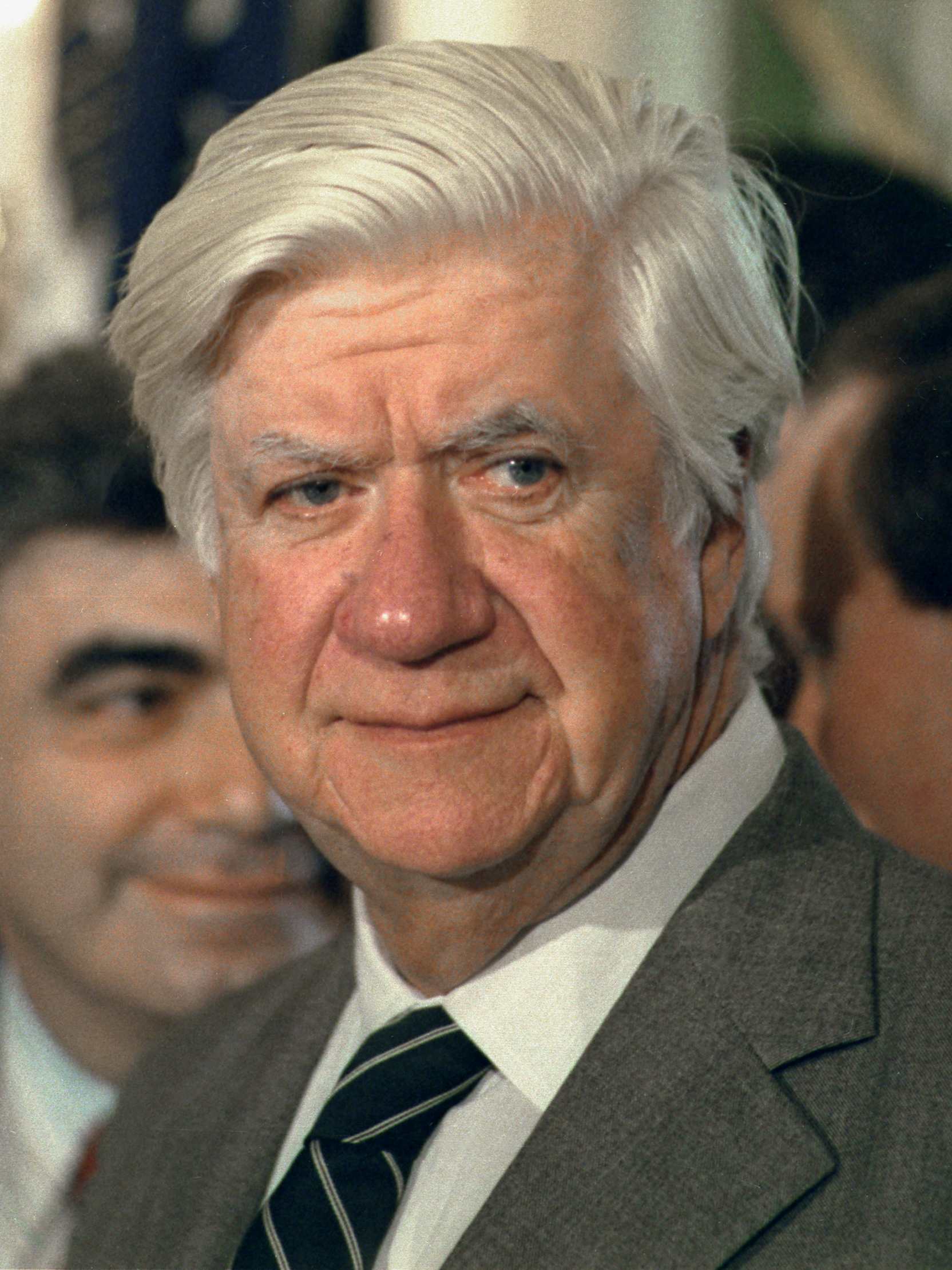

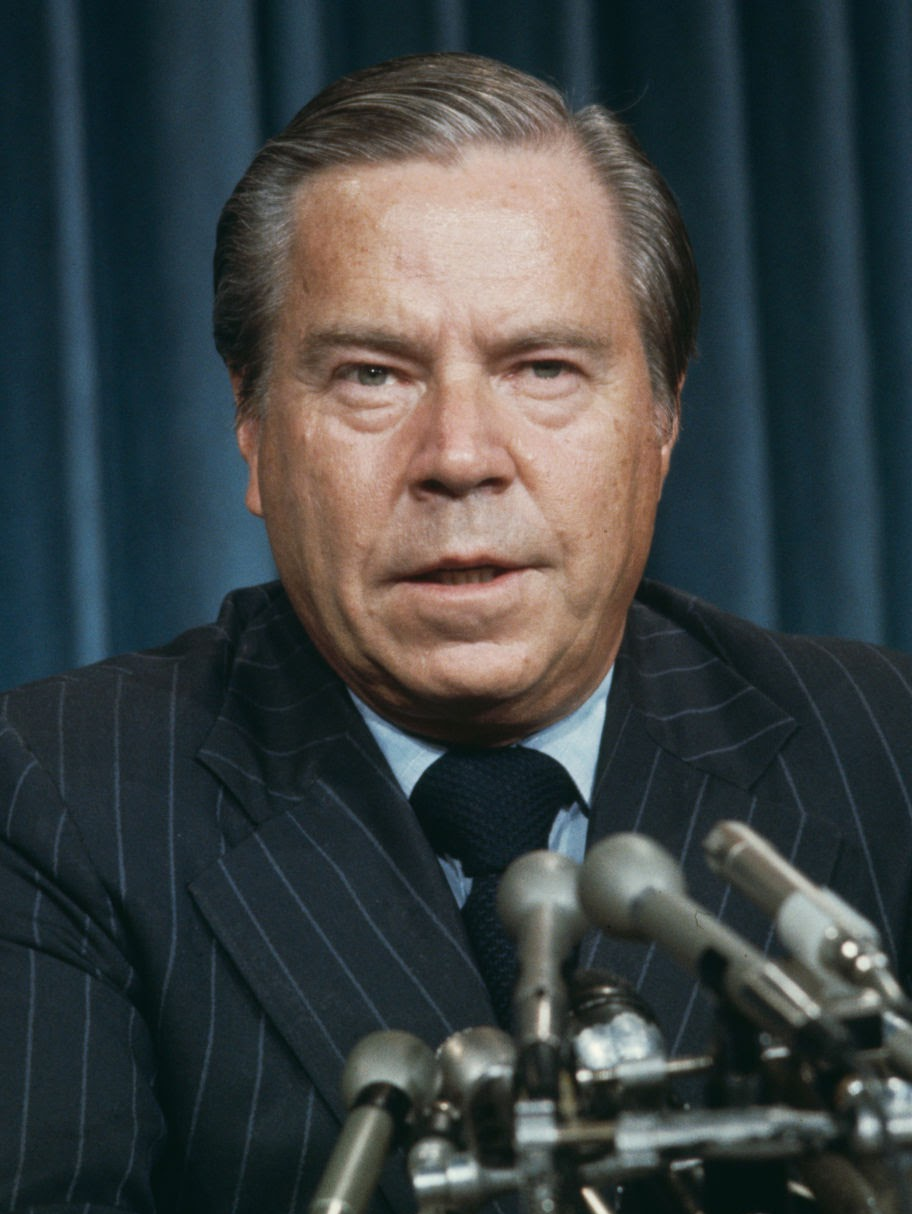
	Majority party	Minority party
Leader	Tip O'Neill	John Rhodes
Party	Democratic	Republican
Leader since	January 4, 1977	December 7, 1973
Leader's seat	Massachusetts 8th	Arizona 1st
Last election	292 seats	143 seats
Seats won	277	157
Seat change	▼15	▲14
Popular vote	29,317,777	24,464,665
Percentage	53.7%	44.8%
Swing	▼2.2pp	▲2.5pp
	Third party
Party	Conservative
Last election	0 seats
Seats won	1 (Note: Winner was elected as a Republican nominee.)
Seat change	▲1
Popular vote	74,531
Percentage	0.1%
Swing	Steady
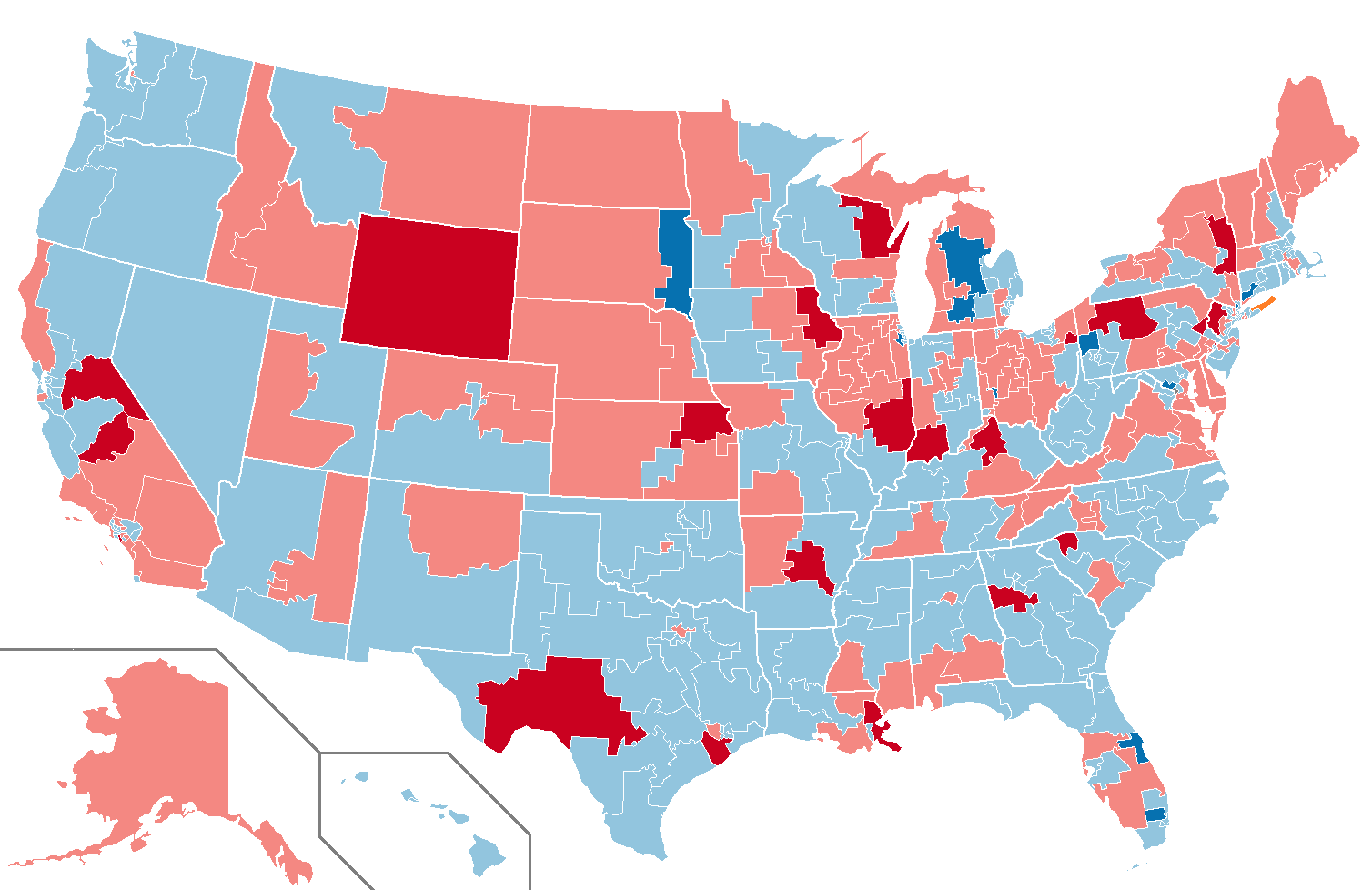
- Results: Democratic hold Democratic gain Republican hold Republican gain Conservative gain
Speaker before election
Tip O'Neill
Democratic
Elected Speaker
Tip O'Neill
Democratic

The 1978 United States House of Representatives elections was an election for the United States House of Representatives on November 7, 1978, to elect members to serve in the 96th United States Congress. They occurred in the middle of Democratic President Jimmy Carter's term, amidst an energy crisis and rapid inflation. The Democratic Party lost a net of 15 seats to the Republican Party, and thus lost their two-thirds supermajority, but still maintained a large 277-seat majority.

As of 2025, this was the last midterm election where the Democrats managed to win a majority in the U.S. House of Representatives under a Democratic president, the last midterm election in which a registered third party member (Note: Representative William Carney of Long Island, New York a registered Conservative Party member running with Republican support.) was elected, and the last time overall in which any party won at least 270 House seats.

== Overall results ==
382 incumbent members sought reelection, but 5 were defeated in primaries and 19 defeated in the general election for a total of 358 incumbents winning.

↓
277	1	157
Democratic	C	Republican

Parties	Seats				Popular vote		
Parties	Previous election	This election	+/-	Strength	Vote	%	Change
Democratic	292	277	▼15	63.7%	29,317,222	53.7%	▼2.2%
Republican	143	157	▲14	36.1%	24,464,665	44.8%	▲2.5%
Independents	Steady	Steady	Steady	Steady	350,898	0.6%	▼0.2%
American Independent	Steady	Steady	Steady	Steady	74,765	0.1%	Steady
Conservative	0	1	▲1	0.2%	74,531	0.1%	Steady
Libertarian	Steady	Steady	Steady	Steady	64,310	0.1%	Steady
U.S. Labor	Steady	Steady	Steady	Steady	45,866	0.1%	Steady
Liberal	Steady	Steady	Steady	Steady	44,807	0.1%	Steady
Peace and Freedom	Steady	Steady	Steady	Steady	39,017	0.1%	▲0.1%
American	Steady	Steady	Steady	Steady	34,110	0.1%	▼0.1%
Socialist Workers	Steady	Steady	Steady	Steady	19,530	<0.1%	Steady
Prohibition	Steady	Steady	Steady	Steady	9,992	<0.1%	Steady
Communist	Steady	Steady	Steady	Steady	9,261	<0.1%	Steady
La Raza Unida	Steady	Steady	Steady	Steady	7,185	<0.1%	Steady
Liberty Union	Steady	Steady	Steady	Steady	6,505	<0.1%	Steady
Peoples Independent Coalition	Steady	Steady	Steady	Steady	5,396	<0.1%	Steady
Workers	Steady	Steady	Steady	Steady	2,709	<0.1%	Steady
Socialist Labor	Steady	Steady	Steady	Steady	2,434	<0.1%	Steady
Aloha Democratic	Steady	Steady	Steady	Steady	2,095	<0.1%	Steady
Betsy Ross	Steady	Steady	Steady	Steady	1,629	<0.1%	Steady
Socialist	Steady	Steady	Steady	Steady	978	<0.1%	Steady
United Labor	Steady	Steady	Steady	Steady	712	<0.1%	Steady
Others	Steady	Steady	Steady	Steady	5,305	<0.1%	▼0.3%
Total	435	435	0	100.0%	54,583,922	100.0%	-

Source: Election Statistics - Office of the Clerk

Popular vote
Democratic	53.71%
Republican	44.82%
Others	1.47%

House seats
Democratic	63.68%
Republican	36.32%

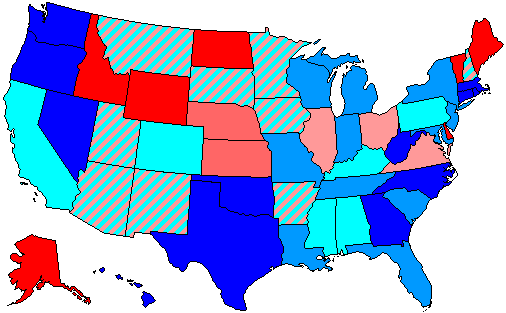
House seats by party holding plurality in state: 80.1-100% Democratic / 80.1-100% Republican; 60.1-80% Democratic / 60.1-80% Republican; Up to 60% Democratic / Up to 60% Republican

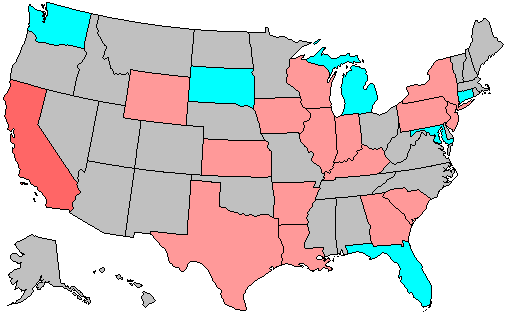
6+ Democratic gain / 6+ Republican gain; 3-5 Democratic gain / 3-5 Republican gain; 1-2 Democratic gain / 1-2 Republican gain; no net change

== Special elections ==
District	Incumbent	Party	First elected	Result	Candidates
New York 18	Ed Koch	Democratic	1968	Incumbent resigned December 31, 1977 to become Mayor of New York City. New member elected February 14, 1978. Winner was subsequently re-elected in November. Republican gain.	✓ Bill Green (Republican) 50.5%; Bella Abzug (Democratic) 48.6%; Howard Lim Jr. (Conservative) 0.7%; Paul Gallagher (Labor) 0.3%
New York 21	Herman Badillo	Democratic	1970	Incumbent resigned December 31, 1977 to become deputy mayor of New York City. New member elected February 14, 1978. Democratic hold.	✓ Robert García (Democratic) (Note: Winner was a Democrat who ran on the Republican line and was accepted back as a Democrat.) 55.40%; Louis Niñé (Democratic) 24.46%; Ramon Velez (Victory) 15.87%; Armando Montano (Build the Bronx) 2.74%; Israel Ruiz Jr. (Alliance for Progress) 1.52%

== Alabama ==
District	Incumbent	Party	First elected	Result	Candidates
Alabama 1	Jack Edwards	Republican	1964	Incumbent re-elected.	✓ Jack Edwards (Republican) 63.9%; L. W. Noonan (Democratic) 36.1%
Alabama 2	William L. Dickinson	Republican	1964	Incumbent re-elected.	✓ William L. Dickinson (Republican) 54.0%; Wendell Mitchell (Democratic) 46.0%
Alabama 3	Bill Nichols	Democratic	1966	Incumbent re-elected.	✓ Bill Nichols (Democratic) Unopposed
Alabama 4	Tom Bevill	Democratic	1966	Incumbent re-elected.	✓ Tom Bevill (Democratic) Unopposed
Alabama 5	Ronnie Flippo	Democratic	1976	Incumbent re-elected.	✓ Ronnie Flippo (Democratic) 96.8%; Harvey Nicholas Crumhorn (Libertarian) 3.2%
Alabama 6	John H. Buchanan Jr.	Republican	1964	Incumbent re-elected.	✓ John H. Buchanan Jr. (Republican) 61.7%; Don Hawkins (Democratic) 38.3%
Alabama 7	Walter Flowers	Democratic	1968	Incumbent retired to run for U.S. Senator. Democratic hold.	✓ Richard Shelby (Democratic) 93.8%; Fulton Gray (Con) 4.0%; Jim Scruggs (Republican) 2.2%

== Alaska ==
District	Incumbent	Party	First elected	Result	Candidates
Alaska at-large	Don Young	Republican	1973	Incumbent re-elected.	✓ Don Young (Republican) 55.5%; Patrick Rodey (Democratic) 44.5%

== Arizona ==
District	Incumbent	Party	First elected	Result	Candidates
Arizona 1	John Jacob Rhodes	Republican	1952	Incumbent re-elected.	✓ John Jacob Rhodes (Republican) 71.0%; Ken Graves (Democratic) 29.0%
Arizona 2	Mo Udall	Democratic	1961 (Special)	Incumbent re-elected.	✓ Mo Udall (Democratic) 52.5%; Tom Richey (Republican) 45.4%; Joe Bach (Libertarian) 1.1%; Betsy McDonald (Socialist Workers) 0.9%
Arizona 3	Bob Stump	Democratic	1976	Incumbent re-elected.	✓ Bob Stump (Democratic) 85.0%; Kathleen Cooke (Libertarian) 15.0%
Arizona 4	Eldon Rudd	Republican	1976	Incumbent re-elected.	✓ Eldon Rudd (Republican) 63.1%; Michael McCormick (Democratic) 33.8%; Lawrence W. Jerome (Libertarian) 3.1%

== Arkansas ==
District	Incumbent	Party	First elected	Result	Candidates
Arkansas 1	Bill Alexander	Democratic	1968	Incumbent re-elected.	✓ Bill Alexander (Democratic) Unopposed
Arkansas 2	Jim Guy Tucker	Democratic	1976	Incumbent retired to run for U.S. Senator. Republican gain.	✓ Ed Bethune (Republican) 51.2%; Doug Brandon (Democratic) 48.8%
Arkansas 3	John Paul Hammerschmidt	Republican	1966	Incumbent re-elected.	✓ John Paul Hammerschmidt (Republican) 78.4%; William Curtis Mears (Democratic) 21.6%
Arkansas 4	Ray Thornton	Democratic	1972	Incumbent retired to run for U.S. Senator. Democratic hold.	✓ Beryl Anthony Jr. (Democratic) Unopposed

== California ==
District	Incumbent	Party	First elected	Result	Candidates
California 1	Bizz Johnson	Democratic	1958	Incumbent re-elected.	✓ Bizz Johnson (Democratic) 59.4%; James E. Taylor (Republican) 40.6%
California 2	Don Clausen	Republican	1963	Incumbent re-elected.	✓ Don Clausen (Republican) 52.0%; Norma K. Bork (Democratic) 45.3%; Irv Sutley (Peace and Freedom) 2.8%
California 3	John E. Moss	Democratic	1952	Incumbent retired. Democratic hold.	✓ Bob Matsui (Democratic) 53.4%; Sandy Smoley (Republican) 46.6%
California 4	Robert Leggett	Democratic	1962	Incumbent retired. Democratic hold.	✓ Vic Fazio (Democratic) 55.4%; Rex Hime (Republican) 44.6%
California 5	John Burton	Democratic	1974	Incumbent re-elected.	✓ John Burton (Democratic) 66.8%; Dolores Skore (Republican) 33.2%
California 6	Phillip Burton	Democratic	1964	Incumbent re-elected.	✓ Phillip Burton (Democratic) 68.3%; Tom Spinosa (Republican) 28.0%; Raymond O. "Ray" Heaps (American Independent) 3.7%
California 7	George Miller	Democratic	1974	Incumbent re-elected.	✓ George Miller (Democratic) 63.4%; Paula Gordon (Republican) 33.7%; Melvin E. Stanley (American Independent) 2.8%
California 8	Ron Dellums	Democratic	1970	Incumbent re-elected.	✓ Ron Dellums (Democratic) 57.4%; Charles V. Hughes (Republican) 42.6%
California 9	Pete Stark	Democratic	1972	Incumbent re-elected.	✓ Pete Stark (Democratic) 65.4%; Robert S. Allen (Republican) 30.5%; Lawrence J. Phillips (Peace and Freedom) 4.1%
California 10	Don Edwards	Democratic	1962	Incumbent re-elected.	✓ Don Edwards (Democratic) 67.1%; Rudy Hansen (Republican) 32.9%
California 11	Leo Ryan	Democratic	1972	Incumbent re-elected, Following the election, Ryan was murdered while investigating the Peoples Temple in Guyana	✓ Leo Ryan (Democratic) 60.5%; Dave Welch (Republican) 35.6%; Nicholas W. Kudrovzeff (American Independent) 3.9%
California 12	Pete McCloskey	Republican	1967	Incumbent re-elected.	✓ Pete McCloskey (Republican) 73.1%; Kirsten Olsen (Democratic) 21.5%; Harold R. Boylan (American Independent) 3.5%; Adele Fumino (Peace and Freedom) 1.9%
California 13	Norman Mineta	Democratic	1974	Incumbent re-elected.	✓ Norman Mineta (Democratic) 57.5%; Dan O'Keefe (Republican) 39.5%; Robert Goldsborough III (Peace and Freedom) 3.0%
California 14	John J. McFall	Democratic	1956	Incumbent lost re-election. Republican gain.	✓ Norman D. Shumway (Republican) 53.4%; John J. McFall (Democratic) 42.6%; George Darold Waldron (American Independent) 4.0%
California 15	B. F. Sisk	Democratic	1954	Incumbent retired. Democratic hold.	✓ Tony Coelho (Democratic) 60.1%; Chris Patterakis (Republican) 39.9%
California 16	Leon Panetta	Democratic	1976	Incumbent re-elected.	✓ Leon Panetta (Democratic) 61.4%; Eric Seastrand (Republican) 38.6%
California 17	John Hans Krebs	Democratic	1974	Incumbent lost re-election. Republican gain.	✓ Chip Pashayan (Republican) 54.5%; John Hans Krebs (Democratic) 45.5%
California 18	Vacant			William M. Ketchum (Republican) died June 24, 1978; Republican hold.	✓ Bill Thomas (Republican) 59.3%; Bob Sogge (Democratic) 40.7%
California 19	Robert Lagomarsino	Republican	1974	Incumbent re-elected.	✓ Robert Lagomarsino (Republican) 71.7%; Jerry Zamos (Democratic) 24.3%; Milton Shiro Takei (Peace and Freedom) 4.0%
California 20	Barry Goldwater Jr.	Republican	1969	Incumbent re-elected.	✓ Barry Goldwater Jr. (Republican) 66.4%; Patti Lear Corman (Democratic) 33.6%
California 21	James C. Corman	Democratic	1960	Incumbent re-elected.	✓ James C. Corman (Democratic) 59.5%; Rod Walsh (Republican) 35.9%; Bill Hill (Peace and Freedom) 4.6%
California 22	Carlos Moorhead	Republican	1972	Incumbent re-elected.	✓ Carlos Moorhead (Republican) 64.6%; Robert S. Henry (Democratic) 35.4%
California 23	Anthony Beilenson	Democratic	1976	Incumbent re-elected.	✓ Anthony Beilenson (Democratic) 65.6%; Joseph Barbara (Republican) 34.4%
California 24	Henry Waxman	Democratic	1974	Incumbent re-elected.	✓ Henry Waxman (Democratic) 62.7%; Howard G. Schaefer (Republican) 32.6%; Kevin Casey Peters (Peace and Freedom) 4.8%
California 25	Edward R. Roybal	Democratic	1962	Incumbent re-elected.	✓ Edward R. Roybal (Democratic) 67.4%; Robert K. Watson (Republican) 32.6%
California 26	John H. Rousselot	Republican	1960; 1962 (defeated); 1970 (Special)	Incumbent re-elected.	✓ John H. Rousselot (Republican) Unopposed
California 27	Bob Dornan	Republican	1976	Incumbent re-elected.	✓ Bob Dornan (Republican) 51.0%; Carey Peck (Democratic) 49.0%
California 28	Yvonne Brathwaite Burke	Democratic	1972	Incumbent retired to run for Attorney General of California. Democratic hold.	✓ Julian Dixon (Democratic) Unopposed
California 29	Augustus Hawkins	Democratic	1962	Incumbent re-elected.	✓ Augustus Hawkins (Democratic) 85.0%; Uriah J. Fields (Republican) 15.0%
California 30	George E. Danielson	Democratic	1970	Incumbent re-elected.	✓ George E. Danielson (Democratic) 71.4%; Henry Ares (Republican) 28.6%
California 31	Charles H. Wilson	Democratic	1962	Incumbent re-elected.	✓ Charles H. Wilson (Democratic) 67.8%; Don Grimshaw (Republican) 32.2%
California 32	Glenn M. Anderson	Democratic	1968	Incumbent re-elected.	✓ Glenn M. Anderson (Democratic) 71.4%; Sonya Mathison (Republican) 22.4%; Ida Bader (American Independent) 6.1%
California 33	Del M. Clawson	Republican	1963	Incumbent retired. Republican hold.	✓ Wayne R. Grisham (Republican) 56.0%; Dennis S. Kazarian (Democratic) 44.0%
California 34	Mark W. Hannaford	Democratic	1974	Incumbent lost re-election. Republican gain.	✓ Dan Lungren (Republican) 53.7%; Mark W. Hannaford (Democratic) 43.7%; Lawrence John Stafford (American Independent) 2.6%
California 35	James F. Lloyd	Democratic	1974	Incumbent re-elected.	✓ James F. Lloyd (Democratic) 54.0%; David Dreier (Republican) 46.0%
California 36	George Brown Jr.	Democratic	1962; 1970 (Retired); 1972	Incumbent re-elected.	✓ George Brown Jr. (Democratic) 62.9%; Dana Warren Carmody (Republican) 37.1%
California 37	Shirley Neil Pettis	Republican	1975	Incumbent retired. Republican hold.	✓ Jerry Lewis (Republican) 61.4%; Dan Corcoran (Democratic) 34.8%; Bernard Wahl (American Independent) 3.8%
California 38	Jerry M. Patterson	Democratic	1974	Incumbent re-elected.	✓ Jerry M. Patterson (Democratic) 58.6%; Dan Goedeke (Republican) 41.4%
California 39	Charles E. Wiggins	Republican	1966	Incumbent retired. Republican hold.	✓ William E. Dannemeyer (Republican) 63.7%; William E. "Bill" Farris (Democratic) 36.3%
California 40	Robert Badham	Republican	1976	Incumbent re-elected.	✓ Robert Badham (Republican) 65.9%; Jim McGuy (Democratic) 34.1%
California 41	Bob Wilson	Republican	1952	Incumbent re-elected.	✓ Bob Wilson (Republican) 58.1%; King Golden Jr. (Democratic) 41.9%
California 42	Lionel Van Deerlin	Democratic	1962	Incumbent re-elected.	✓ Lionel Van Deerlin (Democratic) 73.7%; Lawrence C. Mattera (Republican) 26.3%
California 43	Clair Burgener	Republican	1972	Incumbent re-elected.	✓ Clair Burgener (Republican) 68.7%; Ruben B. Brooks (Democratic) 31.3%

== Colorado ==
District	Incumbent	Party	First elected	Result	Candidates
Colorado 1	Pat Schroeder	Democratic	1972	Incumbent re-elected.	✓ Pat Schroeder (Democratic) 61.5%; Gene Hutcheson (Republican) 37.0%; Susan Lorraine Adley (Socialist Workers) 1.5%
Colorado 2	Tim Wirth	Democratic	1974	Incumbent re-elected.	✓ Tim Wirth (Democratic) 52.9%; Ed Scott (Republican) 47.1%
Colorado 3	Frank Evans	Democratic	1964	Incumbent retired. Democratic hold.	✓ Ray Kogovsek (Democratic) 49.3%; Harold L. McCormick (Republican) 49.0%; Henry John Olshaw (Independent) 1.7%
Colorado 4	James Paul Johnson	Republican	1972	Incumbent re-elected.	✓ James Paul Johnson (Republican) 61.2%; Morgan Smith (Democratic) 38.8%
Colorado 5	William L. Armstrong	Republican	1972	Incumbent retired to run for U.S. Senator. Republican hold.	✓ Ken Kramer (Republican) 59.8%; Gerry Frank (Democratic) 34.4%; L. W. Dan Bridges (Independent) 5.8%

== Connecticut ==
District	Incumbent	Party	First elected	Result	Candidates
Connecticut 1	William R. Cotter	Democratic	1970	Incumbent re-elected.	✓ William R. Cotter (Democratic) 59.6%; Ben F. Andrews Jr. (Republican) 39.3%; Donna C. McDonough (Lab) 1.1%
Connecticut 2	Chris Dodd	Democratic	1974	Incumbent re-elected.	✓ Chris Dodd (Democratic) 69.9%; Thomas Hudson Connell (Republican) 30.1%
Connecticut 3	Robert Giaimo	Democratic	1958	Incumbent re-elected.	✓ Robert Giaimo (Democratic) 58.1%; John G. Pucciano (Republican) 40.0%; Joelle R. Fishman (Communist) 1.8%
Connecticut 4	Stewart McKinney	Republican	1970	Incumbent re-elected.	✓ Stewart McKinney (Republican) 58.4%; Michael G. Morgan (Democratic) 41.6%
Connecticut 5	Ronald A. Sarasin	Republican	1972	Incumbent retired to run for Governor of Connecticut. Democratic gain.	✓ William R. Ratchford (Democratic) 52.3%; George C. Guidera (Republican) 47.7%
Connecticut 6	Toby Moffett	Democratic	1974	Incumbent re-elected.	✓ Toby Moffett (Democratic) 64.2%; Daniel F. Mackinnon (Republican) 35.8%

== Delaware ==
District	Incumbent	Party	First elected	Result	Candidates
Delaware at-large	Thomas B. Evans Jr.	Republican	1976	Incumbent re-elected.	✓ Thomas B. Evans Jr. (Republican) 58.2%; Gary E. Hindes (Democratic) 41.2%; James E. Hicks (American Independent) 0.6%

== Florida ==
District	Incumbent	Party	First elected	Result	Candidates
Florida 1	Bob Sikes	Democratic	1940; 1944 (resigned); 1944	Incumbent retired. Democratic hold.	✓ Earl Hutto (Democratic) 63.3%; Warren Briggs (Republican) 36.7%
Florida 2	Don Fuqua	Democratic	1962	Incumbent re-elected.	✓ Don Fuqua (Democratic) 81.7%; Pete Brathwaite (Republican) 18.3%
Florida 3	Charles E. Bennett	Democratic	1948	Incumbent re-elected.	✓ Charles E. Bennett (Democratic) Unopposed
Florida 4	Bill Chappell	Democratic	1968	Incumbent re-elected.	✓ Bill Chappell (Democratic) 73.1%; Tom Boney (Republican) 26.9%
Florida 5	Richard Kelly	Republican	1974	Incumbent re-elected.	✓ Richard Kelly (Republican) 51.1%; David Ryan Best (Democratic) 48.9%
Florida 6	Bill Young	Republican	1970	Incumbent re-elected.	✓ Bill Young (Republican) 78.8%; Jim Christison (Democratic) 21.2%
Florida 7	Sam Gibbons	Democratic	1962	Incumbent re-elected.	✓ Sam Gibbons (Democratic) Unopposed
Florida 8	Andy Ireland	Democratic	1976	Incumbent re-elected.	✓ Andy Ireland (Democratic) Unopposed
Florida 9	Louis Frey Jr.	Republican	1968	Incumbent retired to run for Governor of Florida. Democratic gain.	✓ Bill Nelson (Democratic) 61.5%; Edward Gurney (Republican) 38.5%
Florida 10	Skip Bafalis	Republican	1972	Incumbent re-elected.	✓ Skip Bafalis (Republican) Unopposed
Florida 11	Paul Rogers	Democratic	1954	Incumbent retired. Democratic hold.	✓ Dan Mica (Democratic) 55.3%; Bill James (Republican) 44.7%
Florida 12	J. Herbert Burke	Republican	1966	Incumbent lost re-election. Democratic gain.	✓ Edward J. Stack (Democratic) 61.6%; J. Herbert Burke (Republican) 38.4%
Florida 13	William Lehman	Democratic	1972	Incumbent re-elected.	✓ William Lehman (Democratic) Unopposed
Florida 14	Claude Pepper	Democratic	1962	Incumbent re-elected.	✓ Claude Pepper (Democratic) 63.1%; Al Cárdenas (Republican) 36.9%
Florida 15	Dante Fascell	Democratic	1954	Incumbent re-elected.	✓ Dante Fascell (Democratic) 74.2%; Herbert J. Hoodwin (Republican) 25.8%

== Georgia ==
District	Incumbent	Party	First elected	Result	Candidates
Georgia 1	Bo Ginn	Democratic	1972	Incumbent re-elected.	✓ Bo Ginn (Democratic) Unopposed
Georgia 2	Dawson Mathis	Democratic	1970	Incumbent re-elected.	✓ Dawson Mathis (Democratic) Unopposed
Georgia 3	Jack Brinkley	Democratic	1966	Incumbent re-elected.	✓ Jack Brinkley (Democratic) Unopposed
Georgia 4	Elliott H. Levitas	Democratic	1974	Incumbent re-elected.	✓ Elliott H. Levitas (Democratic) 80.9%; Homer Cheung (Republican) 19.1%
Georgia 5	Wyche Fowler	Democratic	1977 (Special)	Incumbent re-elected.	✓ Wyche Fowler (Democratic) 75.5%; Thomas P. Bowles Jr. (Republican) 24.5%
Georgia 6	John Flynt	Democratic	1954	Incumbent retired. Republican gain.	✓ Newt Gingrich (Republican) 54.4%; Virginia Shapard (Democratic) 45.6%
Georgia 7	Larry McDonald	Democratic	1974	Incumbent re-elected.	✓ Larry McDonald (Democratic) 66.5%; Ernest Norsworthy (Republican) 33.5%
Georgia 8	Billy Lee Evans	Democratic	1976	Incumbent re-elected.	✓ Billy Lee Evans (Democratic) Unopposed
Georgia 9	Ed Jenkins	Democratic	1976	Incumbent re-elected.	✓ Ed Jenkins (Democratic) 76.9%; David G. Ashworth (Republican) 23.1%
Georgia 10	Doug Barnard Jr.	Democratic	1976	Incumbent re-elected.	✓ Doug Barnard Jr. (Democratic) Unopposed

== Hawaii ==
District	Incumbent	Party	First elected	Result	Candidates
Hawaii 1	Cecil Heftel	Democratic	1976	Incumbent re-elected.	✓ Cecil Heftel (Democratic) 73.3%; William D. Spillane (Republican) 21.2%; Peter David Larsen (Libertarian) 3.7%; Debra Figueroa (Ind Dem) 1.8%
Hawaii 2	Daniel Akaka	Democratic	1976	Incumbent re-elected.	✓ Daniel Akaka (Democratic) 85.7%; Charlie Isaak (Republican) 11.4%; Amelia L. Fritts (Libertarian) 2.9%

== Idaho ==
District	Incumbent	Party	First elected	Result	Candidates
Idaho 1	Steve Symms	Republican	1972	Incumbent re-elected.	✓ Steve Symms (Republican) 59.9%; Roy Truby (Democratic) 40.1%
Idaho 2	George V. Hansen	Republican	1964; 1968 (retired); 1974	Incumbent re-elected.	✓ George V. Hansen (Republican) 57.3%; Stan Kress (Democratic) 42.7%

== Illinois ==
District	Incumbent	Party	First elected	Result	Candidates
Illinois 1	Ralph Metcalfe	Democratic	1970	Incumbent died. Democratic hold.	✓ Bennett Stewart (Democratic) 58.5%; A. A. Rayner Jr. (Republican) 41.3%; Others (W/I) 0.2%
Illinois 2	Morgan F. Murphy	Democratic	1970	Incumbent re-elected.	✓ Morgan F. Murphy (Democratic) 86.0%; James P. Wognum (Republican) 11.8%; Carl Stanley Holmes (Independent) 2.2%
Illinois 3	Marty Russo	Democratic	1974	Incumbent re-elected.	✓ Marty Russo (Democratic) 65.2%; Robert L. Dunne (Republican) 34.8%
Illinois 4	Ed Derwinski	Republican	1958	Incumbent re-elected.	✓ Ed Derwinski (Republican) 66.9%; Andrew Thomas (Democratic) 33.1%
Illinois 5	John G. Fary	Democratic	1975	Incumbent re-elected.	✓ John G. Fary (Democratic) 84.0%; Joseph A. Barracca (Republican) 16.0%
Illinois 6	Henry Hyde	Republican	1974	Incumbent re-elected.	✓ Henry Hyde (Republican) 66.2%; Jeanne P. Quinn (Democratic) 33.8%
Illinois 7	Cardiss Collins	Democratic	1973	Incumbent re-elected.	✓ Cardiss Collins (Democratic) 86.3%; James C. Holt (Republican) 13.7%
Illinois 8	Dan Rostenkowski	Democratic	1958	Incumbent re-elected.	✓ Dan Rostenkowski (Democratic) 86.0%; Carl C. LoDico (Republican) 14.0%
Illinois 9	Sidney R. Yates	Democratic	1948; 1962 (retired); 1964	Incumbent re-elected.	✓ Sidney R. Yates (Democratic) 75.3%; John M. Collins (Republican) 24.7%
Illinois 10	Abner Mikva	Democratic	1968; 1972 (defeated); 1974	Incumbent re-elected.	✓ Abner Mikva (Democratic) 50.2%; John Porter (Republican) 49.8%
Illinois 11	Frank Annunzio	Democratic	1964	Incumbent re-elected.	✓ Frank Annunzio (Democratic) 73.7%; John Hoeger (Republican) 26.3%
Illinois 12	Phil Crane	Republican	1969	Incumbent re-elected.	✓ Phil Crane (Republican) 79.5%; Gilbert Bogen (Democratic) 20.5%
Illinois 13	Robert McClory	Republican	1962	Incumbent re-elected.	✓ Robert McClory (Republican) 61.2%; Frederick J. Steffen (Democratic) 38.8%
Illinois 14	John N. Erlenborn	Republican	1964	Incumbent re-elected.	✓ John N. Erlenborn (Republican) 75.1%; James A. Romanyak (Democratic) 24.9%
Illinois 15	Tom Corcoran	Republican	1976	Incumbent re-elected.	✓ Tom Corcoran (Republican) 62.4%; Tim Lee Hall (Democratic) 37.6%
Illinois 16	John B. Anderson	Republican	1960	Incumbent re-elected.	✓ John B. Anderson (Republican) 65.5%; Ernest W. Dahlin (Democratic) 34.5%
Illinois 17	George M. O'Brien	Republican	1972	Incumbent re-elected.	✓ George M. O'Brien (Republican) 70.6%; Clifford J. Sinclair (Democratic) 29.4%
Illinois 18	Robert H. Michel	Republican	1956	Incumbent re-elected.	✓ Robert H. Michel (Republican) 65.9%; Virgil R. Grunkmeyer (Democratic) 34.1%
Illinois 19	Tom Railsback	Republican	1966	Incumbent re-elected.	✓ Tom Railsback (Republican) Unopposed
Illinois 20	Paul Findley	Republican	1960	Incumbent re-elected.	✓ Paul Findley (Republican) 69.6%; Victor Roberts (Democratic) 30.4%
Illinois 21	Ed Madigan	Republican	1972	Incumbent re-elected.	✓ Ed Madigan (Republican) 78.3%; Ken Baughman (Democratic) 21.7%
Illinois 22	George E. Shipley	Democratic	1958	Incumbent retired. Republican gain.	✓ Dan Crane (Republican) 54.0%; Terry L. Bruce (Democratic) 46.0%
Illinois 23	Melvin Price	Democratic	1944	Incumbent re-elected.	✓ Melvin Price (Democratic) 74.2%; Daniel J. Stack (Republican) 25.8%
Illinois 24	Paul Simon	Democratic	1974	Incumbent re-elected.	✓ Paul Simon (Democratic) 65.6%; John T. Anderson (Republican) 34.4%

== Indiana ==
District	Incumbent	Party	First elected	Result	Candidates
Indiana 1	Adam Benjamin Jr.	Democratic	1976	Incumbent re-elected.	✓ Adam Benjamin Jr. (Democratic) 80.3%; Owen W. Crumpacker (Republican) 19.3%; Christopher Martinson (Lab) 0.4%
Indiana 2	Floyd Fithian	Democratic	1974	Incumbent re-elected.	✓ Floyd Fithian (Democratic) 56.5%; Jay Philip Oppenheim (Republican) 36.2%; William Costas (Independent) 6.4%; James Hensley Logan (American Independent) 0.8%
Indiana 3	John Brademas	Democratic	1958	Incumbent re-elected.	✓ John Brademas (Democratic) 55.5%; Thomas L. Thorson (Republican) 43.3%; R. Craig Fisher (Libertarian) 1.2%
Indiana 4	Dan Quayle	Republican	1976	Incumbent re-elected.	✓ Dan Quayle (Republican) 64.4%; John D. Walda (Democratic) 33.8%; Terry Eugene Hively (American Independent) 1.9%
Indiana 5	Elwood Hillis	Republican	1970	Incumbent re-elected.	✓ Elwood Hillis (Republican) 67.6%; Max Ervin Heiss (Democratic) 32.4%
Indiana 6	David W. Evans	Democratic	1974	Incumbent re-elected.	✓ David W. Evans (Democratic) 52.2%; David G. Crane (Republican) 47.6%; John Williams Rothrock Jr. (Libertarian) 0.2%
Indiana 7	John T. Myers	Republican	1966	Incumbent re-elected.	✓ John T. Myers (Republican) 56.3%; Charlotte T. Zietlow (Democratic) 43.7%
Indiana 8	David L. Cornwell	Democratic	1976	Incumbent lost re-election. Republican gain.	✓ H. Joel Deckard (Republican) 52.0%; David L. Cornwell (Democratic) 48.0%
Indiana 9	Lee H. Hamilton	Democratic	1964	Incumbent re-elected.	✓ Lee H. Hamilton (Democratic) 65.6%; Frank I. Hamilton Jr. (Republican) 34.4%
Indiana 10	Philip Sharp	Democratic	1974	Incumbent re-elected.	✓ Philip Sharp (Democratic) 56.1%; Bill Frazier (Republican) 42.8%; George W. Ames (American Independent) 1.1%
Indiana 11	Andrew Jacobs Jr.	Democratic	1964; 1972 (defeated); 1974	Incumbent re-elected.	✓ Andrew Jacobs Jr. (Democratic) 57.2%; Charles E. Bosma (Republican) 42.6%; Henry Slubowski (Socialist Workers) 0.1%

== Iowa ==
District	Incumbent	Party	First elected	Result	Candidates
Iowa 1	Jim Leach	Republican	1976	Incumbent re-elected.	✓ Jim Leach (Republican) 63.5%; Richard E. Myers (Democratic) 35.8%; William R. Douglas (Socialist) 0.8%
Iowa 2	Mike Blouin	Democratic	1974	Incumbent lost re-election. Republican gain.	✓ Tom Tauke (Republican) 52.3%; Mike Blouin (Democratic) 47.1%; James D. Roberson (Independent) 0.6%
Iowa 3	Chuck Grassley	Republican	1974	Incumbent re-elected.	✓ Chuck Grassley (Republican) 74.8%; John Knudson (Democratic) 25.2%
Iowa 4	Neal Smith	Democratic	1958	Incumbent re-elected.	✓ Neal Smith (Democratic) 64.7%; Charles E. Minor (Republican) 35.3%
Iowa 5	Tom Harkin	Democratic	1974	Incumbent re-elected.	✓ Tom Harkin (Democratic) 58.9%; Julian B. Garrett (Republican) 41.1%
Iowa 6	Berkley Bedell	Democratic	1974	Incumbent re-elected.	✓ Berkley Bedell (Democratic) 66.3%; Willis Edgar Junker (Republican) 33.7%

== Kansas ==
District	Incumbent	Party	First elected	Result	Candidates
Kansas 1	Keith Sebelius	Republican	1968	Incumbent re-elected.	✓ Keith Sebelius (Republican) Unopposed
Kansas 2	Martha Keys	Democratic	1974	Incumbent lost re-election. Republican gain.	✓ Jim Jeffries (Republican) 52.0%; Martha Keys (Democratic) 48.0%
Kansas 3	Larry Winn	Republican	1966	Incumbent re-elected.	✓ Larry Winn (Republican) Unopposed
Kansas 4	Dan Glickman	Democratic	1976	Incumbent re-elected.	✓ Dan Glickman (Democratic) 69.6%; James Paul Litsey (Republican) 30.4%
Kansas 5	Joe Skubitz	Republican	1962	Incumbent retired. Republican hold.	✓ Bob Whittaker (Republican) 57.0%; Donald L. Allegrucci (Democratic) 41.4%; Jack C. Blackwell (Proh) 1.6%

== Kentucky ==
District	Incumbent	Party	First elected	Result	Candidates
Kentucky 1	Carroll Hubbard	Democratic	1974	Incumbent re-elected.	✓ Carroll Hubbard (Democratic) Unopposed
Kentucky 2	William Natcher	Democratic	1953 (Special)	Incumbent re-elected.	✓ William Natcher (Democratic) Unopposed
Kentucky 3	Romano Mazzoli	Democratic	1970	Incumbent re-elected.	✓ Romano Mazzoli (Democratic) 65.7%; Norbert Drummond Leveronne (Republican) 31.3%; Tom Beckham (Independent) 2.3%; James Burfeind (Socialist Workers) 0.8%
Kentucky 4	Gene Snyder	Republican	1962; 1964 (defeated); 1966	Incumbent re-elected.	✓ Gene Snyder (Republican) 65.8%; George Clarke Martin (Democratic) 34.2%
Kentucky 5	Tim Lee Carter	Republican	1964	Incumbent re-elected.	✓ Tim Lee Carter (Republican) 79.2%; Jesse M. Ramey (Democratic) 20.8%
Kentucky 6	John B. Breckinridge	Democratic	1972	Incumbent lost renomination. Republican gain.	✓ Larry J. Hopkins (Republican) 50.6%; Charles T. Easterly (Democratic) 46.1%; Lloyd K. Rogers (American Independent) 3.2%
Kentucky 7	Carl D. Perkins	Democratic	1948	Incumbent re-elected.	✓ Carl D. Perkins (Democratic) 76.5%; Granville Thomas (Republican) 23.5%

== Louisiana ==
The seven incumbents were all automatically re-elected when no opponents filed to run against them in the Sept. 16 jungle primary. They did not appear on the ballot.

Leach and Wilson were the top two finishers in the 4th District's jungle primary and advanced to the Nov. 7 general election.

District	Incumbent	Party	First elected	Result	Candidates
Louisiana 1	Bob Livingston	Republican	1977 (Special)	Incumbent re-elected.	✓ Bob Livingston (Republican) Unopposed
Louisiana 2	Lindy Boggs	Democratic	1973 (Special)	Incumbent re-elected.	✓ Lindy Boggs (Democratic) Unopposed
Louisiana 3	Dave Treen	Republican	1972	Incumbent re-elected.	✓ Dave Treen (Republican) Unopposed
Louisiana 4	Joe Waggonner	Democratic	1961 (Special)	Incumbent retired. Democratic hold.	✓ Buddy Leach (Democratic) 50.1%; James Hamilton Wilson (Republican) 49.9%
Louisiana 5	Jerry Huckaby	Democratic	1976	Incumbent re-elected.	✓ Jerry Huckaby (Democratic) Unopposed
Louisiana 6	Henson Moore	Republican	1974	Incumbent re-elected.	✓ Henson Moore (Republican) Unopposed
Louisiana 7	John Breaux	Democratic	1972	Incumbent re-elected.	✓ John Breaux (Democratic) Unopposed
Louisiana 8	Gillis William Long	Democratic	1962; 1964 (lost renomination); 1972	Incumbent re-elected.	✓ Gillis William Long (Democratic) Unopposed

== Maine ==
District	Incumbent	Party	First elected	Result	Candidates
Maine 1	David F. Emery	Republican	1974	Incumbent re-elected.	✓ David F. Emery (Republican) 61.5%; John Quinn (Democratic) 35.8%; J. David Madigan (Independent) 2.7%
Maine 2	William Cohen	Republican	1972	Incumbent retired to run for U.S. Senator. Republican hold.	✓ Olympia Snowe (Republican) 50.8%; Markham L. Gartley (Democratic) 40.9%; Frederick W. Whittaker (Independent) 4.6%; Eddie Shurtleff (Independent) 1.1%; Robert H. Burmeister (Independent) 1.0%; Margaret E. Cousins (Independent) 0.9%; Robert L. Cousins (Independent) 0.7%

== Maryland ==
District	Incumbent	Party	First elected	Result	Candidates
Maryland 1	Robert Bauman	Republican	1973	Incumbent re-elected.	✓ Robert Bauman (Republican) 63.5%; Joseph D. Quinn (Democratic) 36.5%
Maryland 2	Clarence Long	Democratic	1962	Incumbent re-elected.	✓ Clarence Long (Democratic) 66.4%; Malcolm M. McKnight (Republican) 33.6%
Maryland 3	Barbara Mikulski	Democratic	1976	Incumbent re-elected.	✓ Barbara Mikulski (Democratic) Unopposed
Maryland 4	Marjorie Holt	Republican	1972	Incumbent re-elected.	✓ Marjorie Holt (Republican) 62.0%; Sue F. Ward (Democratic) 38.0%
Maryland 5	Gladys Spellman	Democratic	1974	Incumbent re-elected.	✓ Gladys Spellman (Democratic) 77.2%; Saul J. Harris (Republican) 22.8%
Maryland 6	Goodloe Byron	Democratic	1970	Incumbent died. Democratic hold.	✓ Beverly Byron (Democratic) 89.7%; Melvin Perkins (Republican) 10.3%
Maryland 7	Parren Mitchell	Democratic	1970	Incumbent re-elected.	✓ Parren Mitchell (Democratic) 88.7%; Debra J. Hanania-Freeman (Independent) 11.3%
Maryland 8	Newton Steers	Republican	1976	Incumbent lost re-election. Democratic gain.	✓ Michael D. Barnes (Democratic) 51.3%; Newton Steers (Republican) 48.7%

== Massachusetts ==
District	Incumbent	Party	First elected	Result	Candidates
Massachusetts 1	Silvio O. Conte	Republican	1958	Incumbent re-elected.	✓ Silvio O. Conte (Republican) Unopposed
Massachusetts 2	Edward Boland	Democratic	1952	Incumbent re-elected.	✓ Edward Boland (Democratic) 72.8%; Thomas P. Swank (Republican) 27.2%
Massachusetts 3	Joseph D. Early	Democratic	1974	Incumbent re-elected.	✓ Joseph D. Early (Democratic) 75.2%; Charles K. Macleod (Republican) 24.8%
Massachusetts 4	Robert Drinan	Democratic	1970	Incumbent re-elected.	✓ Robert Drinan (Democratic) Unopposed
Massachusetts 5	Paul Tsongas	Democratic	1974	Incumbent retired to run for U.S. Senator. Democratic hold.	✓ James Shannon (Democratic) 52.2%; John J. Buckley (Republican) 28.2%; James J. Gaffney III (Independent) 19.6%
Massachusetts 6	Michael J. Harrington	Democratic	1969	Incumbent retired. Democratic hold.	✓ Nicholas Mavroules (Democratic) 53.8%; William E. Bronson (Republican) 46.2%
Massachusetts 7	Ed Markey	Democratic	1976	Incumbent re-elected.	✓ Ed Markey (Democratic) 84.8%; James J. Murphy (Independent) 15.2%
Massachusetts 8	Tip O'Neill	Democratic	1952	Incumbent re-elected.	✓ Tip O'Neill (Democratic) 74.6%; William A. Barnstead (Republican) 20.9%; Laura M. Ross (Constitution) 4.5%
Massachusetts 9	Joe Moakley	Democratic	1972	Incumbent re-elected.	✓ Joe Moakley (Democratic) 91.8%; Brenda Lee M. Franklin (Socialist Workers) 5.8%; David Freund (Workers) 2.3%
Massachusetts 10	Margaret Heckler	Republican	1966	Incumbent re-elected.	✓ Margaret Heckler (Republican) 61.1%; John J. Marino (Democratic) 38.9%
Massachusetts 11	James A. Burke	Democratic	1958	Incumbent retired. Democratic hold.	✓ Brian J. Donnelly (Democratic) 91.7%; H. Graham Lowry (Lab) 8.3%
Massachusetts 12	Gerry Studds	Democratic	1972	Incumbent re-elected.	✓ Gerry Studds (Democratic) Unopposed

== Michigan ==
District	Incumbent	Party	First elected	Result	Candidates
Michigan 1	John Conyers Jr.	Democratic	1964	Incumbent re-elected.	✓ John Conyers Jr. (Democratic) 92.9%; Robert S. Arnold (Republican) 7.1%
Michigan 2	Carl Pursell	Republican	1976	Incumbent re-elected.	✓ Carl Pursell (Republican) 67.6%; Earl Greene (Democratic) 31.6%; Henry W. Kroes Jr. (American Independent) 0.8%
Michigan 3	Garry E. Brown	Republican	1966	Incumbent lost re-election. Democratic gain.	✓ Howard Wolpe (Democratic) 51.3%; Garry E. Brown (Republican) 48.7%
Michigan 4	David Stockman	Republican	1976	Incumbent re-elected.	✓ David Stockman (Republican) 70.6%; Morgan L. Hager Jr. (Democratic) 28.3%; Jimmie Dale Burke (American Independent) 1.1%
Michigan 5	Harold S. Sawyer	Republican	1976	Incumbent re-elected.	✓ Harold S. Sawyer (Republican) 49.4%; Dale Robert Sprik (Democratic) 48.7%; Dwight W. Johnson (American Independent) 1.8%
Michigan 6	Milton Robert Carr	Democratic	1974	Incumbent re-elected.	✓ Milton Robert Carr (Democratic) 56.7%; Michael H. Conlin (Republican) 43.3%
Michigan 7	Dale E. Kildee	Democratic	1976	Incumbent re-elected.	✓ Dale E. Kildee (Democratic) 76.6%; Gale M. Cronk (Republican) 21.8%; Jimmy L. Sabin (American Independent) 1.6%
Michigan 8	J. Bob Traxler	Democratic	1974	Incumbent re-elected.	✓ J. Bob Traxler (Democratic) 66.6%; Norman R. Hughes (Republican) 33.4%
Michigan 9	Guy Vander Jagt	Republican	1966	Incumbent re-elected.	✓ Guy Vander Jagt (Republican) 69.6%; Howard M. LeRoux (Democratic) 30.4%
Michigan 10	Elford Albin Cederberg	Republican	1952	Incumbent lost re-election. Democratic gain.	✓ Donald J. Albosta (Democratic) 51.5%; Elford Albin Cederberg (Republican) 48.5%
Michigan 11	Philip Ruppe	Republican	1966	Incumbent retired. Republican hold.	✓ Robert William Davis (Republican) 54.9%; Keith McLeod (Democratic) 45.1%
Michigan 12	David Bonior	Democratic	1976	Incumbent re-elected.	✓ David Bonior (Democratic) 54.9%; Kirby Holmes (Republican) 45.1%
Michigan 13	Charles Diggs	Democratic	1954	Incumbent re-elected.	✓ Charles Diggs (Democratic) 79.2%; Dovie T. Pickett (Republican) 20.8%
Michigan 14	Lucien Nedzi	Democratic	1961	Incumbent re-elected.	✓ Lucien Nedzi (Democratic) 67.4%; John Edward Getz (Republican) 32.6%
Michigan 15	William D. Ford	Democratic	1964	Incumbent re-elected.	✓ William D. Ford (Democratic) 79.6%; Edgar Nieten (Republican) 19.4%; Aldi C. Fuhrmann (American Independent) 1.0%
Michigan 16	John D. Dingell Jr.	Democratic	1955 (Special)	Incumbent re-elected.	✓ John D. Dingell Jr. (Democratic) 76.5%; Melvin E. Heuer (Republican) 22.0%; Harry C. Hengy (American Independent) 1.5%
Michigan 17	William M. Brodhead	Democratic	1974	Incumbent re-elected.	✓ William M. Brodhead (Democratic) 95.2%; Hector M. McGregor (American Independent) 4.8%
Michigan 18	James J. Blanchard	Democratic	1974	Incumbent re-elected.	✓ James J. Blanchard (Democratic) 74.5%; Robert J. Salloum (Republican) 24.3%; David Wengel Drexler (American Independent) 1.2%
Michigan 19	William Broomfield	Republican	1956	Incumbent re-elected.	✓ William Broomfield (Republican) 71.3%; Betty F. Collier (Democratic) 28.7%

== Minnesota ==
District	Incumbent	Party	First elected	Result	Candidates
Minnesota 1	Al Quie	Republican	1958	Incumbent retired to run for Governor of Minnesota. Republican hold.	✓ Arlen Erdahl (Republican) 56.2%; Gerry Sikorski (Democratic–Farmer–Labor) 42.5%; Lloyd Duwe (American) 1.3%
Minnesota 2	Tom Hagedorn	Republican	1974	Incumbent re-elected.	✓ Tom Hagedorn (Republican) 70.4%; John F. Considine (Democratic–Farmer–Labor) 29.6%
Minnesota 3	Bill Frenzel	Republican	1970	Incumbent re-elected.	✓ Bill Frenzel (Republican) 65.7%; Michael O. Freeman (Democratic–Farmer–Labor) 34.3%
Minnesota 4	Bruce Vento	Democratic	1976	Incumbent re-elected.	✓ Bruce Vento (Democratic–Farmer–Labor) 58.0%; John Berg (Republican) 42.0%
Minnesota 5	Donald M. Fraser	Democratic	1962	Incumbent retired to run for U.S. Senator. Democratic hold.	✓ Martin Olav Sabo (Democratic–Farmer–Labor) 62.3%; Mike Till (Republican) 37.7%
Minnesota 6	Rick Nolan	Democratic	1974	Incumbent re-elected.	✓ Rick Nolan (Democratic–Farmer–Labor) 55.3%; Russ Njorhus (Republican) 44.7%
Minnesota 7	Arlan Stangeland	Republican	1977	Incumbent re-elected.	✓ Arlan Stangeland (Republican) 51.7%; Gene R. Wenstrom (Democratic–Farmer–Labor) 45.1%; Ronald M. Holmquist (American) 3.2%
Minnesota 8	Jim Oberstar	Democratic	1974	Incumbent re-elected.	✓ Jim Oberstar (Democratic–Farmer–Labor) 87.2%; John W. Hull (American) 12.8%

== Mississippi ==
District	Incumbent	Party	First elected	Result	Candidates
Mississippi 1	Jamie Whitten	Democratic	1941	Incumbent re-elected.	✓ Jamie Whitten (Democratic) 66.6%; Terrill K. Moffett (Republican) 31.0%; Horace E. Hutcheson (Independent) 2.4%
Mississippi 2	David R. Bowen	Democratic	1972	Incumbent re-elected.	✓ David R. Bowen (Democratic) 61.7%; Roland Byrd (Republican) 38.3%
Mississippi 3	Sonny Montgomery	Democratic	1966	Incumbent re-elected.	✓ Sonny Montgomery (Democratic) 92.4%; Dorothy Eleanor Cleveland (Republican) 7.6%
Mississippi 4	Thad Cochran	Republican	1972	Incumbent retired to run for U.S. Senator. Republican hold.	✓ Jon Hinson (Republican) 51.6%; John H. Stennis (Democratic) 26.4%; Evan Doss Jr. (Independent) 19.0%; Perry Lawrence Dillard (Independent) 1.9%; Mary McKenzie Maxey (Independent) 1.1%
Mississippi 5	Trent Lott	Republican	1972	Incumbent re-elected.	✓ Trent Lott (Republican) Unopposed

== Missouri ==
District	Incumbent	Party	First elected	Result	Candidates
Missouri 1	Bill Clay	Democratic	1968	Incumbent re-elected.	✓ Bill Clay (Democratic) 66.6%; Bill White (Republican) 31.3%; Mary Pritchard (Socialist Workers) 1.4%; Gerald Pechenuk (Lab) 0.7%
Missouri 2	Robert A. Young	Democratic	1976	Incumbent re-elected.	✓ Robert A. Young (Democratic) 56.4%; Bob Chase (Republican) 43.6%
Missouri 3	Dick Gephardt	Democratic	1976	Incumbent re-elected.	✓ Dick Gephardt (Democratic) 81.9%; Lee Buchschacher (Republican) 18.1%
Missouri 4	Ike Skelton	Democratic	1976	Incumbent re-elected.	✓ Ike Skelton (Democratic) 72.8%; Bill Baker (Republican) 27.2%
Missouri 5	Richard Bolling	Democratic	1948	Incumbent re-elected.	✓ Richard Bolling (Democratic) 72.0%; Steven L. Walter (Republican) 26.6%; James Levitt (Socialist Workers) 1.4%
Missouri 6	Tom Coleman	Republican	1976	Incumbent re-elected.	✓ Tom Coleman (Republican) 55.9%; Phil Snowden (Democratic) 44.1%
Missouri 7	Gene Taylor	Republican	1972	Incumbent re-elected.	✓ Gene Taylor (Republican) 61.2%; Jim Thomas (Democratic) 38.8%
Missouri 8	Richard Howard Ichord Jr.	Democratic	1960	Incumbent re-elected.	✓ Richard Howard Ichord Jr. (Democratic) 60.5%; Donald D. Meyer (Republican) 39.5%
Missouri 9	Harold Volkmer	Democratic	1976	Incumbent re-elected.	✓ Harold Volkmer (Democratic) 74.7%; Jerry Dent (Republican) 25.3%
Missouri 10	Bill Burlison	Democratic	1968	Incumbent re-elected.	✓ Bill Burlison (Democratic) 65.3%; James A. Weir (Republican) 34.7%

== Montana ==
District	Incumbent	Party	First elected	Result	Candidates
Montana 1	Max Baucus	Democratic	1974	Incumbent retired to run for U.S. senator. Democratic hold.	✓ Pat Williams (Democratic) 57.3%; Jim Waltermire (Republican) 42.7%
Montana 2	Ron Marlenee	Republican	1976	Incumbent re-elected.	✓ Ron Marlenee (Republican) 56.9%; Thomas G. Monahan (Democratic) 43.1%

== Nebraska ==
District	Incumbent	Party	First elected	Result	Candidates
Nebraska 1	Charles Thone	Republican	1970	Incumbent retired to run for Governor of Nebraska. Republican hold.	✓ Doug Bereuter (Republican) 58.1%; Hess Dyas (Democratic) 41.9%
Nebraska 2	John Joseph Cavanaugh III	Democratic	1976	Incumbent re-elected.	✓ John Joseph Cavanaugh III (Democratic) 52.3%; Hal Daub (Republican) 47.7%
Nebraska 3	Virginia D. Smith	Republican	1974	Incumbent re-elected.	✓ Virginia D. Smith (Republican) 80.0%; Marilyn Fowler (Democratic) 20.0%

== Nevada ==
District	Incumbent	Party	First elected	Result	Candidates
Nevada at-large	James David Santini	Democratic	1974	Incumbent re-elected.	✓ James David Santini (Democratic) 69.5%; Bill O'Mara (Republican) 23.3%; None of These Candidates (Independent) 4.0%; Linda West (Libertarian) 3.2%

== New Hampshire ==
District	Incumbent	Party	First elected	Result	Candidates
New Hampshire 1	Norman D'Amours	Democratic	1974	Incumbent re-elected.	✓ Norman D'Amours (Democratic) 61.6%; Daniel M. Hughes (Republican) 36.6%; James E. Pinard (Libertarian) 1.8%
New Hampshire 2	James Colgate Cleveland	Republican	1962	Incumbent re-elected.	✓ James Colgate Cleveland (Republican) 68.1%; Edgar J. Helms (Democratic) 31.9%

== New Jersey ==
District	Incumbent	Party	First elected	Result	Candidates
New Jersey 1	James Florio	Democratic	1974	Incumbent re-elected.	✓ James Florio (Democratic) 79.4%; Robert Mark Deitch (Republican) 20.1%; Julius Levin (Socialist Labor) 0.5%
New Jersey 2	William J. Hughes	Democratic	1974	Incumbent re-elected.	✓ William J. Hughes (Democratic) 66.4%; James H. Biggs (Republican) 33.6%
New Jersey 3	James J. Howard	Democratic	1964	Incumbent re-elected.	✓ James J. Howard (Democratic) 56.0%; Bruce G. Coe (Republican) 43.5%; Stevenson M. Enterline (Libertarian) 0.6%
New Jersey 4	Frank Thompson	Democratic	1954	Incumbent re-elected.	✓ Frank Thompson (Democratic) 61.1%; Chris Smith (Republican) 36.9%; John Valjean Mahalchik (Independent) 1.0%; Paul B. Rizzo (Independent) 0.7%; Judson Carter (Independent) 0.3%
New Jersey 5	Millicent Fenwick	Republican	1974	Incumbent re-elected.	✓ Millicent Fenwick (Republican) 72.6%; John T. Fahy (Democratic) 27.4%
New Jersey 6	Edwin B. Forsythe	Republican	1970	Incumbent re-elected.	✓ Edwin B. Forsythe (Republican) 60.4%; W. Thomas McGann (Democratic) 38.4%; Bernardo S. Doganiero (Socialist Labor) 0.5%; Charles M. Pike Jr. (Libertarian) 0.4%; Hazel McGlory (Independent) 0.3%
New Jersey 7	Andrew Maguire	Democratic	1974	Incumbent re-elected.	✓ Andrew Maguire (Democratic) 52.5%; Marge Roukema (Republican) 46.6%; Robert Shapiro (Libertarian) 0.7%; Elliot Greenspan (Lab) 0.2%
New Jersey 8	Robert A. Roe	Democratic	1970	Incumbent re-elected.	✓ Robert A. Roe (Democratic) 74.5%; Thomas Melani (Republican) 25.5%
New Jersey 9	Harold C. Hollenbeck	Republican	1976	Incumbent re-elected.	✓ Harold C. Hollenbeck (Republican) 48.9%; Nicholas S. Mastorelli (Democratic) 37.9%; Henry Helstoski (Independent) 12.7%; Bruce Todd (Lab) 0.4%
New Jersey 10	Peter W. Rodino	Democratic	1948	Incumbent re-elected.	✓ Peter W. Rodino (Democratic) 86.4%; John L. Pelt (Republican) 12.6%; Tony Austin (Socialist Workers) 0.5%; Gordon A. Douglas (Lab) 0.5%
New Jersey 11	Joseph Minish	Democratic	1962	Incumbent re-elected.	✓ Joseph Minish (Democratic) 70.5%; Julius George Feld (Republican) 28.5%; Richard S. Roth (Libertarian) 1.0%
New Jersey 12	Matthew John Rinaldo	Republican	1972	Incumbent re-elected.	✓ Matthew John Rinaldo (Republican) 73.4%; Richard McCormack (Democratic) 26.6%
New Jersey 13	Helen Stevenson Meyner	Democratic	1974	Incumbent lost re-election. Republican gain.	✓ Jim Courter (Republican) 51.8%; Helen Stevenson Meyner (Democratic) 48.2%
New Jersey 14	Joseph A. LeFante	Democratic	1976	Incumbent retired. Democratic hold.	✓ Frank Joseph Guarini (Democratic) 63.6%; Henry J. Hill (Republican) 20.3%; Thomas E. McDonough (Independent) 14.3%; John E. Walton (Independent) 1.9%
New Jersey 15	Edward J. Patten	Democratic	1962	Incumbent re-elected.	✓ Edward J. Patten (Democratic) 48.3%; Charles W. Wiley (Republican) 45.8%; Ann V. Bastian (Independent) 4.7%; Michael Fieschko (Libertarian) 1.2%

== New Mexico ==
District	Incumbent	Party	First elected	Result	Candidates
New Mexico 1	Manuel Lujan Jr.	Republican	1968	Incumbent re-elected.	✓ Manuel Lujan Jr. (Republican) 62.5%; Robert M. Hawk (Democratic) 37.5%
New Mexico 2	Harold L. Runnels	Democratic	1970	Incumbent re-elected.	✓ Harold L. Runnels (Democratic) Unopposed

== New York ==
District	Incumbent	Party	First elected	Result	Candidates
New York 1	Otis G. Pike	Democratic	1960	Incumbent retired. Conservative gain.	✓ William Carney (Con/Republican) 56.3%; John Randolph (Democratic) 41.9%; Dorothy A. Samek (Lib) 1.8%
New York 2	Thomas J. Downey	Democratic	1974	Incumbent re-elected.	✓ Thomas J. Downey (Democratic) 54.9%; Harold J. Withers (Republican) 45.1%
New York 3	Jerome Ambro	Democratic	1974	Incumbent re-elected.	✓ Jerome Ambro (Democratic) 50.9%; Gregory W. Carman (Republican) 47.9%; William Clark (Lib) 1.2%
New York 4	Norman F. Lent	Republican	1970	Incumbent re-elected.	✓ Norman F. Lent (Republican) 66.1%; Everett A. Rosenblum (Democratic) 32.5%; Aaron M. Schein (Lib) 1.5%
New York 5	John W. Wydler	Republican	1962	Incumbent re-elected.	✓ John W. Wydler (Republican) 58.4%; John W. Matthews (Democratic) 41.6%
New York 6	Lester L. Wolff	Democratic	1964	Incumbent re-elected.	✓ Lester L. Wolff (Democratic) 60.0%; Stuart L. Ain (Republican) 32.9%; Howard Horowitz (Con) 7.1%
New York 7	Joseph P. Addabbo	Democratic	1960	Incumbent re-elected.	✓ Joseph P. Addabbo (Democratic) 94.9%; Mark Elliott Scott (Con) 5.1%
New York 8	Benjamin Stanley Rosenthal	Democratic	1962	Incumbent re-elected.	✓ Benjamin Stanley Rosenthal (Democratic) 78.6%; Albert Lemishow (Republican) 15.9%; Paul C. Ruebenacker (Con) 5.4%
New York 9	James J. Delaney	Democratic	1944; 1946 (defeated); 1948	Incumbent retired. Democratic hold.	✓ Geraldine Ferraro (Democratic) 54.2%; Alfred A. DelliBovi (Republican) 44.4%; Theodore E. Garrison (Lib) 1.4%
New York 10	Mario Biaggi	Democratic	1968	Incumbent re-elected.	✓ Mario Biaggi (Democratic) 95.0%; Carmen Ricciardi (Con) 5.0%
New York 11	James H. Scheuer	Democratic	1964; 1972 (defeated); 1974	Incumbent re-elected.	✓ James H. Scheuer (Democratic) 78.5%; Kenneth Huhn (Republican) 21.5%
New York 12	Shirley Chisholm	Democratic	1968	Incumbent re-elected.	✓ Shirley Chisholm (Democratic) 87.8%; Charles Gibbs (Republican) 12.2%
New York 13	Stephen J. Solarz	Democratic	1974	Incumbent re-elected.	✓ Stephen J. Solarz (Democratic) 81.1%; Max Carasso (Republican) 18.9%
New York 14	Fred Richmond	Democratic	1974	Incumbent re-elected.	✓ Fred Richmond (Democratic) 76.9%; Arthur Bramwell (Republican) 18.4%; Ralph J. Carrano (Con) 3.3%; Sharon D. Grant (Socialist Workers) 1.4%
New York 15	Leo C. Zeferetti	Democratic	1974	Incumbent re-elected.	✓ Leo C. Zeferetti (Democratic) 68.1%; Robert P. Whelan (Republican) 28.4%; Ronald Seminara (Lib) 3.5%
New York 16	Elizabeth Holtzman	Democratic	1972	Incumbent re-elected.	✓ Elizabeth Holtzman (Democratic) 81.9%; Larry Penner (Republican) 12.9%; John H. Fox (Con) 5.2%
New York 17	John M. Murphy	Democratic	1962	Incumbent re-elected.	✓ John M. Murphy (Democratic) 54.2%; John M. Peters (Republican) 33.1%; Thomas Hoyt Stokes (Lib) 12.7%
New York 18	Bill Green	Republican	1978	Incumbent re-elected.	✓ Bill Green (Republican) 53.3%; Carter Burden (Democratic) 46.7%
New York 19	Charles B. Rangel	Democratic	1970	Incumbent re-elected.	✓ Charles B. Rangel (Democratic) 96.4%; E. Freeman Yearling (Con) 2.7%; Kenneth B. Miliner (Socialist Workers) 1.0%
New York 20	Theodore S. Weiss	Democratic	1976	Incumbent re-elected.	✓ Theodore S. Weiss (Democratic) 84.6%; Harry Torczyner (Republican) 15.4%
New York 21	Robert García	Democratic	1978	Incumbent re-elected.	✓ Robert García (Democratic) 98.0%; Lawrence W. Lindsley (Con) 2.0%
New York 22	Jonathan Brewster Bingham	Democratic	1964	Incumbent re-elected.	✓ Jonathan Brewster Bingham (Democratic) 84.1%; Anthony J. Geidel Jr. (Republican) 15.9%
New York 23	Bruce F. Caputo	Republican	1976	Incumbent retired to run for Lieutenant Governor of New York. Democratic gain.	✓ Peter A. Peyser (Democratic) 51.6%; Angelo Martinelli (Republican) 46.2%; John P. Hagan (Lib) 2.1%
New York 24	Richard Ottinger	Democratic	1964; 1970 (retired); 1974	Incumbent re-elected.	✓ Richard Ottinger (Democratic) 56.1%; Michael R. Edelman (Republican) 42.7%; Richard O. Reyes (Lib) 1.1%; Michael O'Mara Billington (Independent) 0.1%
New York 25	Hamilton Fish IV	Republican	1968	Incumbent re-elected.	✓ Hamilton Fish IV (Republican) 78.2%; Gunars M. Ozols (Democratic) 21.3%; Frank Fletcher (Socialist Labor) 0.5%
New York 26	Benjamin A. Gilman	Republican	1972	Incumbent re-elected.	✓ Benjamin A. Gilman (Republican) 62.3%; Charles Emmet Holbrook (Democratic) 30.0%; William R. Schaeffer Jr. (Con) 7.7%
New York 27	Matthew F. McHugh	Democratic	1974	Incumbent re-elected.	✓ Matthew F. McHugh (Democratic) 55.8%; Neil Tyler Wallace (Republican) 44.2%
New York 28	Samuel S. Stratton	Democratic	1958	Incumbent re-elected.	✓ Samuel S. Stratton (Democratic) 76.3%; Paul H. Tocker (Republican) 19.7%; Richard A. Hind (Lib) 4.0%
New York 29	Edward W. Pattison	Democratic	1974	Incumbent lost re-election. Republican gain.	✓ Gerald B. H. Solomon (Republican) 54.0%; Edward W. Pattison (Democratic) 46.0%
New York 30	Robert C. McEwen	Republican	1964	Incumbent re-elected.	✓ Robert C. McEwen (Republican) 60.5%; Norma A. Bartle (Democratic) 39.5%
New York 31	Donald J. Mitchell	Republican	1972	Incumbent re-elected.	✓ Donald J. Mitchell (Republican) Unopposed
New York 32	James M. Hanley	Democratic	1964	Incumbent re-elected.	✓ James M. Hanley (Democratic) 52.4%; Peter Del Giorno (Republican) 46.1%; Lillian E. Reiner (Lib) 1.5%
New York 33	William F. Walsh	Republican	1972	Incumbent retired. Republican hold.	✓ Gary A. Lee (Republican) 56.0%; Roy A. Bernardi (Democratic) 39.5%; Robert J. Byrne (Con) 3.4%; Lynne Budzinski (Lib) 1.1%
New York 34	Frank Horton	Republican	1962	Incumbent re-elected.	✓ Frank Horton (Republican) 87.1%; Leo J. Kesselring (Con) 12.9%
New York 35	Barber Conable	Republican	1964	Incumbent re-elected.	✓ Barber Conable (Republican) 69.4%; Francis C. Repicci (Democratic) 26.3%; Karen A. Hammel (Con) 4.4%
New York 36	John J. LaFalce	Democratic	1974	Incumbent re-elected.	✓ John J. LaFalce (Democratic) 74.1%; Francina Joyce Cartonia (Republican) 23.5%; Francis P. Mundy (Con) 2.4%
New York 37	Henry J. Nowak	Democratic	1974	Incumbent re-elected.	✓ Henry J. Nowak (Democratic) 78.6%; Charles Poth III (Republican) 19.5%; Dunstan Haettenschwiller (Con) 1.7%; Khushro Ghandi (Lab) 0.3%
New York 38	Jack Kemp	Republican	1970	Incumbent re-elected.	✓ Jack Kemp (Republican) 94.8%; James A. Peck (Lib) 5.2%
New York 39	Stan Lundine	Democratic	1976	Incumbent re-elected.	✓ Stan Lundine (Democratic) 58.5%; Crispin Maguire (Republican) 41.5%

== North Carolina ==
District	Incumbent	Party	First elected	Result	Candidates
North Carolina 1	Walter B. Jones Sr.	Democratic	1966	Incumbent re-elected.	✓ Walter B. Jones Sr. (Democratic) 80.1%; James Milford Newcomb (Republican) 19.9%
North Carolina 2	Lawrence H. Fountain	Democratic	1952	Incumbent re-elected.	✓ Lawrence H. Fountain (Democratic) 78.2%; Barry Lynn Gardner (Republican) 20.2%; Les Koehler (Libertarian) 1.5%
North Carolina 3	Charles Orville Whitley	Democratic	1976	Incumbent re-elected.	✓ Charles Orville Whitley (Democratic) 71.1%; Willard Jackson Blanchard (Republican) 28.9%
North Carolina 4	Ike Franklin Andrews	Democratic	1972	Incumbent re-elected.	✓ Ike Franklin Andrews (Democratic) 94.4%; Naudeen Beek (Libertarian) 5.6%
North Carolina 5	Stephen L. Neal	Democratic	1974	Incumbent re-elected.	✓ Stephen L. Neal (Democratic) 54.2%; Hamilton C. Horton (Republican) 45.8%
North Carolina 6	L. Richardson Preyer	Democratic	1968	Incumbent re-elected.	✓ L. Richardson Preyer (Democratic) 68.4%; George S. Bemus (Republican) 31.6%
North Carolina 7	Charlie Rose	Democratic	1972	Incumbent re-elected.	✓ Charlie Rose (Democratic) 69.9%; Raymond Schrump (Republican) 30.1%
North Carolina 8	Bill Hefner	Democratic	1974	Incumbent re-elected.	✓ Bill Hefner (Democratic) 59.0%; Roger Lee Austin (Republican) 41.0%
North Carolina 9	James G. Martin	Republican	1972	Incumbent re-elected.	✓ James G. Martin (Republican) 68.3%; Charles Kimball Maxwell (Democratic) 30.7%; Frederick W. Pasotto (Libertarian) 0.9%
North Carolina 10	Jim Broyhill	Republican	1962	Incumbent re-elected.	✓ Jim Broyhill (Republican) Unopposed
North Carolina 11	V. Lamar Gudger	Democratic	1976	Incumbent re-elected.	✓ V. Lamar Gudger (Democratic) 53.4%; R. Curtis Ratcliff (Republican) 46.6%

== North Dakota ==
District	Incumbent	Party	First elected	Result	Candidates
North Dakota at-large	Mark Andrews	Republican	1963	Incumbent re-elected.	✓ Mark Andrews (Republican) 67.0%; Bruce F. Hagen (Democratic) 30.9%; Harley J. McLain (Independent) 1.5%; Don Klingensmith (Independent) 0.6%

== Ohio ==
District	Incumbent	Party	First elected	Result	Candidates
Ohio 1	Bill Gradison	Republican	1974	Incumbent re-elected.	✓ Bill Gradison (Republican) 64.5%; Timothy M. Burke (Democratic) 33.9%; Joseph E. May (Independent) 1.7%
Ohio 2	Tom Luken	Democratic	1974 (special); 1974 (defeated); 1976	Incumbent re-elected.	✓ Tom Luken (Democratic) 52.4%; Stanley J. Aronoff (Republican) 47.6%
Ohio 3	Charles W. Whalen Jr.	Republican	1966	Incumbent retired. Democratic gain.	✓ Tony P. Hall (Democratic) 53.8%; Dudley P. Kircher (Republican) 44.4%; Alfred R. Deptula (Independent) 1.8%
Ohio 4	Tennyson Guyer	Republican	1972	Incumbent re-elected.	✓ Tennyson Guyer (Republican) 68.5%; John William Griffin (Democratic) 31.5%
Ohio 5	Del Latta	Republican	1958	Incumbent re-elected.	✓ Del Latta (Republican) 62.6%; James Robert Sherck (Democratic) 37.4%
Ohio 6	Bill Harsha	Republican	1960	Incumbent re-elected.	✓ Bill Harsha (Republican) 64.9%; Ted Strickland (Democratic) 35.1%
Ohio 7	Bud Brown	Republican	1965	Incumbent re-elected.	✓ Bud Brown (Republican) Unopposed
Ohio 8	Tom Kindness	Republican	1974	Incumbent re-elected.	✓ Tom Kindness (Republican) 71.4%; Luella R. Schroeder (Democratic) 28.6%; George Hahn (Independent) 0.003%
Ohio 9	Thomas L. Ashley	Democratic	1954	Incumbent re-elected.	✓ Thomas L. Ashley (Democratic) 63.4%; John C. Hoyt (Republican) 30.3%; Michael James Lewinski (Independent) 4.0%; Edward Silvio Emery (Independent) 2.3%
Ohio 10	Clarence E. Miller	Republican	1966	Incumbent re-elected.	✓ Clarence E. Miller (Republican) 73.9%; James A. Plummer (Democratic) 26.1%
Ohio 11	J. William Stanton	Republican	1964	Incumbent re-elected.	✓ J. William Stanton (Republican) 68.1%; Patrick James Donlin (Democratic) 28.3%; Robert Dean Penny (Independent) 3.6%
Ohio 12	Samuel L. Devine	Republican	1958	Incumbent re-elected.	✓ Samuel L. Devine (Republican) 56.9%; James L. Baumann (Democratic) 43.1%
Ohio 13	Donald J. Pease	Democratic	1976	Incumbent re-elected.	✓ Donald J. Pease (Democratic) 65.1%; Mark W. Whitfield (Republican) 34.9%
Ohio 14	John F. Seiberling	Democratic	1970	Incumbent re-elected.	✓ John F. Seiberling (Democratic) 72.5%; Walter J. Vogel (Republican) 27.5%
Ohio 15	Chalmers Wylie	Republican	1966	Incumbent re-elected.	✓ Chalmers Wylie (Republican) 71.1%; Henry W. Eckhart (Republican) 28.9%
Ohio 16	Ralph Regula	Republican	1972	Incumbent re-elected.	✓ Ralph Regula (Republican) 78.0%; Owen S. Hand Jr. (Democratic) 22.0%
Ohio 17	John M. Ashbrook	Republican	1960	Incumbent re-elected.	✓ John M. Ashbrook (Republican) 67.4%; Kenneth Robert Grier (Democratic) 32.6%
Ohio 18	Douglas Applegate	Democratic	1976	Incumbent re-elected.	✓ Douglas Applegate (Democratic) 59.5%; William J. Ress (Republican) 40.5%
Ohio 19	Charles J. Carney	Democratic	1970	Incumbent lost re-election. Republican gain.	✓ Lyle Williams (Republican) 50.7%; Charles J. Carney (Democratic) 49.3%
Ohio 20	Mary Rose Oakar	Democratic	1976	Incumbent re-elected.	✓ Mary Rose Oakar (Democratic) Unopposed
Ohio 21	Louis Stokes	Democratic	1968	Incumbent re-elected.	✓ Louis Stokes (Democratic) 86.1%; Bill Mack (Republican) 13.9%
Ohio 22	Charles Vanik	Democratic	1954	Incumbent re-elected.	✓ Charles Vanik (Democratic) 66.0%; Richard W. Sander (Republican) 23.3%; James F. Sexton (Independent) 5.4%; Robert E. Lehman (Independent) 5.3%
Ohio 23	Ronald M. Mottl	Democratic	1974	Incumbent re-elected.	✓ Ronald M. Mottl (Democratic) 74.8%; Homer S. Taft (Republican) 25.2%

== Oklahoma ==
District	Incumbent	Party	First elected	Result	Candidates
Oklahoma 1	James R. Jones	Democratic	1972	Incumbent re-elected.	✓ James R. Jones (Democratic) 59.9%; Paula Unruh (Republican) 40.1%
Oklahoma 2	Ted Risenhoover	Democratic	1974	Incumbent lost renomination. Democratic hold.	✓ Mike Synar (Democratic) 54.8%; Gary Richardson (Republican) 45.2%
Oklahoma 3	Wes Watkins	Democratic	1976	Incumbent re-elected.	✓ Wes Watkins (Democratic) Unopposed
Oklahoma 4	Tom Steed	Democratic	1948	Incumbent re-elected.	✓ Tom Steed (Democratic) 60.3%; Seward Eliot Robb (Republican) 39.7%
Oklahoma 5	Mickey Edwards	Republican	1976	Incumbent re-elected.	✓ Mickey Edwards (Republican) 79.9%; Jesse Dennis Knipp (Democratic) 20.1%
Oklahoma 6	Glenn English	Democratic	1974	Incumbent re-elected.	✓ Glenn English (Democratic) 74.2%; Harold V. Hunter (Republican) 25.8%

== Oregon ==
District	Incumbent	Party	First elected	Result	Candidates
Oregon 1	Les AuCoin	Democratic	1974	Incumbent re-elected.	✓ Les AuCoin (Democratic) 62.9%; Nick Bunick (Republican) 37.1%
Oregon 2	Al Ullman	Democratic	1956	Incumbent re-elected.	✓ Al Ullman (Democratic) 69.2%; Terry L. Hicks (Republican) 30.8%
Oregon 3	Robert B. Duncan	Democratic	1962; 1966 (retired); 1974	Incumbent re-elected.	✓ Robert B. Duncan (Democratic) 84.9%; Martin Simon (Lab) 15.1%
Oregon 4	Jim Weaver	Democratic	1974	Incumbent re-elected.	✓ Jim Weaver (Democratic) 56.3%; Jerry Lausmann (Republican) 43.7%

== Pennsylvania ==
District	Incumbent	Party	First elected	Result	Candidates
Pennsylvania 1	Michael Myers	Democratic	1976	Incumbent re-elected.	✓ Michael Myers (Democratic) 71.9%; Samuel N. Fanelli (Republican) 26.1%; Jeffrey C. Smith (Libertarian) 2.0%
Pennsylvania 2	Robert N. C. Nix Sr.	Democratic	1958	Incumbent lost renomination. Democratic hold.	✓ William H. Gray III (Democratic) 82.0%; Roland J. Atkins (Republican) 15.9%; Benjamin A. Bailey (Socialist Workers) 1.4%; Anton Henry Chaitkin (Lab) 0.7%
Pennsylvania 3	Raymond Lederer	Democratic	1976	Incumbent re-elected.	✓ Raymond Lederer (Democratic) 71.8%; Raymond S. Kauffman (Republican) 28.2%
Pennsylvania 4	Joshua Eilberg	Democratic	1966	Incumbent lost re-election. Republican gain.	✓ Charles F. Dougherty (Republican) 55.8%; Joshua Eilberg (Democratic) 44.2%
Pennsylvania 5	Richard T. Schulze	Republican	1974	Incumbent re-elected.	✓ Richard T. Schulze (Republican) 75.1%; Murray P. Zealor (Democratic) 24.9%
Pennsylvania 6	Gus Yatron	Democratic	1968	Incumbent re-elected.	✓ Gus Yatron (Democratic) 73.8%; Stephen Mazur (Republican) 26.2%
Pennsylvania 7	Robert W. Edgar	Democratic	1974	Incumbent re-elected.	✓ Robert W. Edgar (Democratic) 50.3%; Eugene Daniel Kane (Republican) 49.4%; Anthony Nazzereno Esposito (Lab) 0.3%
Pennsylvania 8	Peter H. Kostmayer	Democratic	1976	Incumbent re-elected.	✓ Peter H. Kostmayer (Democratic) 61.1%; G. Roger Bowers (Republican) 38.9%
Pennsylvania 9	Bud Shuster	Republican	1972	Incumbent re-elected.	✓ Bud Shuster (Republican) 74.9%; Blaine Leroy Havice Jr. (Democratic) 25.1%
Pennsylvania 10	Joseph M. McDade	Republican	1962	Incumbent re-elected.	✓ Joseph M. McDade (Republican) 76.5%; Gene Basalyga (Democratic) 23.5%
Pennsylvania 11	Dan Flood	Democratic	1944; 1946 (defeated); 1948; 1952 (defeated); 1954	Incumbent re-elected.	✓ Dan Flood (Democratic) 57.5%; Robert P. Hudock (Republican) 42.5%
Pennsylvania 12	John Murtha	Democratic	1974	Incumbent re-elected.	✓ John Murtha (Democratic) 68.7%; Luther V. Elkin (Republican) 31.3%
Pennsylvania 13	Lawrence Coughlin	Republican	1968	Incumbent re-elected.	✓ Lawrence Coughlin (Republican) 70.5%; Alan Bendix Rubenstein (Democratic) 29.5%
Pennsylvania 14	William S. Moorhead	Democratic	1958	Incumbent re-elected.	✓ William S. Moorhead (Democratic) 57.0%; Stan Thomas (Republican) 41.9%; Stanley James Kuziel (American Independent) 1.0%
Pennsylvania 15	Fred B. Rooney	Democratic	1963	Incumbent lost re-election. Republican gain.	✓ Donald L. Ritter (Republican) 53.2%; Fred B. Rooney (Democratic) 46.8%
Pennsylvania 16	Robert Smith Walker	Republican	1976	Incumbent re-elected.	✓ Robert Smith Walker (Republican) 77.0%; Charles W. Boohar (Democratic) 23.0%
Pennsylvania 17	Allen E. Ertel	Democratic	1976	Incumbent re-elected.	✓ Allen E. Ertel (Democratic) 59.6%; Thomas Richard Rippon (Republican) 40.4%
Pennsylvania 18	Doug Walgren	Democratic	1976	Incumbent re-elected.	✓ Doug Walgren (Democratic) 57.1%; Ted Jacob (Republican) 42.1%; James Gelvin (Lab) 0.8%
Pennsylvania 19	William F. Goodling	Republican	1974	Incumbent re-elected.	✓ William F. Goodling (Republican) 78.7%; Raj Kumar (Democratic) 21.3%
Pennsylvania 20	Joseph M. Gaydos	Democratic	1968	Incumbent re-elected.	✓ Joseph M. Gaydos (Democratic) 72.1%; Kathleen M. Meyer (Republican) 27.9%
Pennsylvania 21	John H. Dent	Democratic	1958	Incumbent retired. Democratic hold.	✓ Donald A. Bailey (Democratic) 52.9%; Robert H. Miller (Republican) 47.1%
Pennsylvania 22	Austin Murphy	Democratic	1976	Incumbent re-elected.	✓ Austin Murphy (Democratic) 71.6%; Marilyn Coyle Ecoff (Republican) 28.4%
Pennsylvania 23	Joseph S. Ammerman	Democratic	1976	Incumbent lost re-election. Republican gain.	✓ William F. Clinger Jr. (Republican) 54.3%; Joseph S. Ammerman (Democratic) 45.7%
Pennsylvania 24	Marc L. Marks	Republican	1976	Incumbent re-elected.	✓ Marc L. Marks (Republican) 64.0%; Joseph P. Vigorito (Democratic) 36.0%
Pennsylvania 25	Gary A. Myers	Republican	1974	Incumbent retired. Democratic gain.	✓ Eugene Atkinson (Democratic) 46.5%; Tim Shaffer (Republican) 42.3%; Robert Henry Morris (Independent) 7.2%; John W. Cook (Independent) 4.0%

== Rhode Island ==
District	Incumbent	Party	First elected	Result	Candidates
Rhode Island 1	Fernand St. Germain	Democratic	1960	Incumbent re-elected.	✓ Fernand St. Germain (Democratic) 61.2%; Jerry Slocum (Republican) 38.8%
Rhode Island 2	Edward Beard	Democratic	1974	Incumbent re-elected.	✓ Edward Beard (Democratic) 52.6%; Claudine Cmarada Schneider (Republican) 47.4%

== South Carolina ==
District	Incumbent	Party	First elected	Result	Candidates
South Carolina 1	Mendel Jackson Davis	Democratic	1971	Incumbent re-elected.	✓ Mendel Jackson Davis (Democratic) 60.4%; C. C. Wannamaker (Republican) 39.6%
South Carolina 2	Floyd Spence	Republican	1970	Incumbent re-elected.	✓ Floyd Spence (Republican) 57.5%; Jack Solomon Bass (Democratic) 42.5%
South Carolina 3	Butler Derrick	Democratic	1974	Incumbent re-elected.	✓ Butler Derrick (Democratic) 81.9%; Anthony Panuccio (Republican) 18.1%
South Carolina 4	James Mann	Democratic	1968	Incumbent retired. Republican gain.	✓ Carroll A. Campbell Jr. (Republican) 52.3%; Max M. Heller (Democratic) 46.0%; Don Sprouse (Independent) 1.7%
South Carolina 5	Kenneth Lamar Holland	Democratic	1974	Incumbent re-elected.	✓ Kenneth Lamar Holland (Democratic) 82.7%; Harold Hough (Independent) 17.3%
South Carolina 6	John Jenrette	Democratic	1974	Incumbent re-elected.	✓ John Jenrette (Democratic) Unopposed

== South Dakota ==
District	Incumbent	Party	First elected	Result	Candidates
South Dakota 1	Larry Pressler	Republican	1974	Incumbent retired to run for U.S. Senator. Democratic gain.	✓ Tom Daschle (Democratic) 50.05%; Leo K. Thorsness (Republican) 49.95%
South Dakota 2	James Abdnor	Republican	1972	Incumbent re-elected.	✓ James Abdnor (Republican) 56.0%; Robert Samuelson (Democratic) 44.0%

== Tennessee ==
District	Incumbent	Party	First elected	Result	Candidates
Tennessee 1	Jimmy Quillen	Republican	1962	Incumbent re-elected.	✓ Jimmy Quillen (Republican) 64.5%; Gordon Ball (Democratic) 35.5%
Tennessee 2	John Duncan Sr.	Republican	1964	Incumbent re-elected.	✓ John Duncan Sr. (Republican) 81.8%; Margaret Francis (Democratic) 18.2%
Tennessee 3	Marilyn Lloyd	Democratic	1974	Incumbent re-elected.	✓ Marilyn Lloyd (Democratic) 88.9%; Dan Rucker East (Independent) 11.1%
Tennessee 4	Al Gore	Democratic	1976	Incumbent re-elected.	✓ Al Gore (Democratic) Unopposed
Tennessee 5	Clifford Allen	Democratic	1975	Incumbent died. Democratic hold.	✓ Bill Boner (Democratic) 51.4%; William Dean Goodwin (Republican) 35.4%; Henry Haile (Independent) 13.2%
Tennessee 6	Robin Beard	Republican	1972	Incumbent re-elected.	✓ Robin Beard (Republican) 74.6%; C. Ronald Arline (Democratic) 25.4%
Tennessee 7	Ed Jones	Democratic	1969	Incumbent re-elected.	✓ Ed Jones (Democratic) 72.9%; Ross Earl Cook (Republican) 27.1%
Tennessee 8	Harold Ford Sr.	Democratic	1974	Incumbent re-elected.	✓ Harold Ford Sr. (Democratic) 69.7%; Duncan Ragsdale (Republican) 29.1%; Richard Whitmore (Independent) 1.3%

== Texas ==
District	Incumbent	Party	First elected	Result	Candidates
Texas 1	Sam B. Hall Jr.	Democratic	1976	Incumbent re-elected.	✓ Sam B. Hall Jr. (Democratic) 78.1%; Fred Hudson (Republican) 21.9%
Texas 2	Charles Wilson	Democratic	1972	Incumbent re-elected.	✓ Charles Wilson (Democratic) 70.1%; James H. Dillion (Republican) 29.9%
Texas 3	James M. Collins	Republican	1968	Incumbent re-elected.	✓ James M. Collins (Republican) Unopposed
Texas 4	Ray Roberts	Democratic	1962	Incumbent re-elected.	✓ Ray Roberts (Democratic) 61.5%; Frank S. Glenn (Republican) 38.5%
Texas 5	Jim Mattox	Democratic	1976	Incumbent re-elected.	✓ Jim Mattox (Democratic) 50.3%; Thomas W. Pauken (Republican) 49.1%; James Michael White (Socialist Workers) 0.6%
Texas 6	Olin E. Teague	Democratic	1946	Incumbent retired. Democratic hold.	✓ Phil Gramm (Democratic) 65.1%; Wes Mowery (Republican) 34.9%
Texas 7	Bill Archer	Republican	1970	Incumbent re-elected.	✓ Bill Archer (Republican) 85.1%; Robert Laurence Hutchings (Democratic) 14.9%
Texas 8	Robert C. Eckhardt	Democratic	1966	Incumbent re-elected.	✓ Robert C. Eckhardt (Democratic) 61.5%; Nick Gearhart (Republican) 38.5%
Texas 9	Jack Brooks	Democratic	1952	Incumbent re-elected.	✓ Jack Brooks (Democratic) 63.3%; Randy Evans (Republican) 36.7%
Texas 10	J. J. Pickle	Democratic	1963	Incumbent re-elected.	✓ J. J. Pickle (Democratic) 76.3%; Emmett Leroy Hudspeth (Republican) 23.7%
Texas 11	William R. Poage	Democratic	1936	Incumbent retired. Democratic hold.	✓ Marvin Leath (Democratic) 51.6%; Jack Burgess (Republican) 48.4%
Texas 12	Jim Wright	Democratic	1954	Incumbent re-elected.	✓ Jim Wright (Democratic) 68.5%; Claude K. Brown (Republican) 31.5%
Texas 13	Jack Hightower	Democratic	1974	Incumbent re-elected.	✓ Jack Hightower (Democratic) 74.9%; Clifford Alvin Jones (Republican) 25.1%
Texas 14	John Andrew Young	Democratic	1956	Incumbent lost renomination. Democratic hold.	✓ Joseph P. Wyatt Jr. (Democratic) 72.4%; Joy Yates (Republican) 27.6%
Texas 15	Kika de la Garza	Democratic	1964	Incumbent re-elected.	✓ Kika de la Garza (Democratic) 66.2%; Robert Lendol McDonald (Republican) 33.8%
Texas 16	Richard Crawford White	Democratic	1964	Incumbent re-elected.	✓ Richard Crawford White (Democratic) 70.0%; Michael Giere (Republican) 30.0%
Texas 17	Omar Burleson	Democratic	1946	Incumbent retired. Democratic hold.	✓ Charles Stenholm (Democratic) 68.1%; Billy L. Fisher (Republican) 31.9%
Texas 18	Barbara Jordan	Democratic	1972	Incumbent retired. Democratic hold.	✓ Mickey Leland (Democratic) 96.8%; Deborah Vee Vernier (Socialist Workers) 3.2%
Texas 19	George H. Mahon	Democratic	1934	Incumbent retired. Democratic hold.	✓ Kent Hance (Democratic) 53.2%; George W. Bush (Republican) 46.8%
Texas 20	Henry B. González	Democratic	1961	Incumbent re-elected.	✓ Henry B. González (Democratic) Unopposed
Texas 21	Bob Krueger	Democratic	1974	Incumbent retired to run for U.S. Senator. Republican gain.	✓ Tom Loeffler (Republican) 57.0%; Nelson Wolff (Democratic) 43.0%
Texas 22	Robert Gammage	Democratic	1976	Incumbent lost re-election. Republican gain.	✓ Ron Paul (Republican) 50.6%; Robert Gammage (Democratic) 49.4%
Texas 23	Abraham Kazen	Democratic	1966	Incumbent re-elected.	✓ Abraham Kazen (Democratic) 89.7%; Agustin Mata (La Raza Unida) 10.3%
Texas 24	Dale Milford	Democratic	1972	Incumbent lost renomination. Democratic hold.	✓ Martin Frost (Democratic) 54.1%; Leo Berman (Republican) 45.9%

== Utah ==
District	Incumbent	Party	First elected	Result	Candidates
Utah 1	K. Gunn McKay	Democratic	1970	Incumbent re-elected.	✓ K. Gunn McKay (Democratic) 51.0%; Jed J. Richardson (Republican) 46.2%; Robert Terrance Owens (American Independent) 2.3%; Dennis A. De Boer (Independent) 0.5%
Utah 2	David Daniel Marriott	Republican	1976	Incumbent re-elected.	✓ David Daniel Marriott (Republican) 62.3%; Edwin Brown Firmage (Democratic) 35.3%; Lawrence Rey Topham (American Independent) 1.0%; Bruce Bangerter (Independent) 0.8%; William C. Hoyle (Independent) 0.7%

== Vermont ==
District	Incumbent	Party	First elected	Result	Candidates
Vermont at-large	Jim Jeffords	Republican	1974	Incumbent re-elected.	✓ Jim Jeffords (Republican) 75.3%; Sarah Marie Dietz (Democratic) 19.3%; Peter Diamondstone (Independent) 5.4%

== Virginia ==
District	Incumbent	Party	First elected	Result	Candidates
Virginia 1	Paul Trible	Republican	1976	Incumbent re-elected.	✓ Paul Trible (Republican) 72.1%; Lewis Burwell Puller Jr. (Democratic) 27.9%
Virginia 2	G. William Whitehurst	Republican	1968	Incumbent re-elected.	✓ G. William Whitehurst (Republican) Unopposed
Virginia 3	David E. Satterfield III	Democratic	1964	Incumbent re-elected.	✓ David E. Satterfield III (Democratic) 87.9%; Alan Robert Ogden (Independent) 12.1%
Virginia 4	Robert Daniel	Republican	1972	Incumbent re-elected.	✓ Robert Daniel (Republican) Unopposed
Virginia 5	Dan Daniel	Democratic	1968	Incumbent re-elected.	✓ Dan Daniel (Democratic) Unopposed
Virginia 6	M. Caldwell Butler	Republican	1972	Incumbent re-elected.	✓ M. Caldwell Butler (Republican) Unopposed
Virginia 7	J. Kenneth Robinson	Republican	1970	Incumbent re-elected.	✓ J. Kenneth Robinson (Republican) 64.3%; Lewis P. Fickett Jr. (Democratic) 35.7%
Virginia 8	Herbert Harris	Democratic	1974	Incumbent re-elected.	✓ Herbert Harris (Democratic) 50.5%; John F. Herrity (Republican) 47.1%; Charles E. Coe (Independent) 2.4%
Virginia 9	William C. Wampler	Republican	1952; 1954 (defeated); 1966	Incumbent re-elected.	✓ William C. Wampler (Republican) 61.9%; Charles Champ Clark (Democratic) 38.1%
Virginia 10	Joseph L. Fisher	Democratic	1974	Incumbent re-elected.	✓ Joseph L. Fisher (Democratic) 53.4%; Frank Wolf (Republican) 46.6%

== Washington ==
District	Incumbent	Party	First elected	Result	Candidates
Washington 1	Joel Pritchard	Republican	1972	Incumbent re-elected.	✓ Joel Pritchard (Republican) 64.0%; Janice Niemi (Democratic) 33.7%; John H. Addison (Libertarian) 2.3%
Washington 2	Lloyd Meeds	Democratic	1964	Incumbent retired. Democratic hold.	✓ Al Swift (Democratic) 51.4%; John Nance Garner (Republican) 48.6%
Washington 3	Don Bonker	Democratic	1974	Incumbent re-elected.	✓ Don Bonker (Democratic) 58.6%; Richard H. Bennett (Republican) 41.4%
Washington 4	Mike McCormack	Democratic	1970	Incumbent re-elected.	✓ Mike McCormack (Democratic) 61.1%; Susan Roylance (Republican) 38.9%
Washington 5	Tom Foley	Democratic	1964	Incumbent re-elected.	✓ Tom Foley (Democratic) 48.0%; Duane Alton (Republican) 42.7%; Mel Tonasket (Independent) 9.3%
Washington 6	Norm Dicks	Democratic	1976	Incumbent re-elected.	✓ Norm Dicks (Democratic) 60.9%; James Edward Beaver (Republican) 37.4%; Mary Kathleen Smith (Socialist Workers) 1.8%
Washington 7	John E. Cunningham	Republican	1977 (special)	Incumbent lost re-election. Democratic gain.	✓ Mike Lowry (Democratic) 53.3%; John E. Cunningham (Republican) 46.7%

== West Virginia ==
District	Incumbent	Party	First elected	Result	Candidates
West Virginia 1	Bob Mollohan	Democratic	1952; 1956 (retired); 1968	Incumbent re-elected.	✓ Bob Mollohan (Democratic) 63.4%; Gene A. Haynes (Republican) 36.6%
West Virginia 2	Harley Orrin Staggers	Democratic	1948	Incumbent re-elected.	✓ Harley Orrin Staggers (Democratic) 55.3%; Cleve Benedict (Republican) 44.7%
West Virginia 3	John M. Slack Jr.	Democratic	1958	Incumbent re-elected.	✓ John M. Slack Jr. (Democratic) 59.2%; Mick Staton (Republican) 40.8%
West Virginia 4	Nick Rahall	Democratic	1976	Incumbent re-elected.	✓ Nick Rahall (Democratic) Unopposed

== Wisconsin ==
District	Incumbent			This race	
District	Member	Party	First elected	Results	Candidates
Wisconsin 1	Les Aspin	Democratic	1970	Incumbent re-elected.	✓ Les Aspin (Democratic) 54.5%; William W. Petrie (Republican) 45.5%
Wisconsin 2	Robert Kastenmeier	Democratic	1958	Incumbent re-elected.	✓ Robert Kastenmeier (Democratic) 57.7%; James A. Wright (Republican) 41.3%; Dick G. Fields (Independent) 1.0%
Wisconsin 3	Alvin Baldus	Democratic	1974	Incumbent re-elected.	✓ Alvin Baldus (Democratic) 62.8%; Michael Steven Ellis (Republican) 37.2%
Wisconsin 4	Clement J. Zablocki	Democratic	1948	Incumbent re-elected.	✓ Clement J. Zablocki (Democratic) 66.1%; Elroy C. Honadel (Republican) 33.9%
Wisconsin 5	Henry S. Reuss	Democratic	1954	Incumbent re-elected.	✓ Henry S. Reuss (Democratic) 73.1%; James R. W. Medina (Republican) 25.9%; Paul Greenberg (Independent) 0.7%; John Edward Sokoly (Independent) 0.3%
Wisconsin 6	William A. Steiger	Republican	1966	Incumbent re-elected.	✓ William A. Steiger (Republican) 69.6%; Robert J. Steffes (Democratic) 29.6%; Gordon Ponschock (Con) 0.8%
Wisconsin 7	Dave Obey	Democratic	1969 (Special)	Incumbent re-elected.	✓ Dave Obey (Democratic) 62.2%; Vinton A. Vesta (Republican) 36.9%; George Olishkewych (Con) 0.9%
Wisconsin 8	Robert John Cornell	Democratic	1974	Incumbent lost re-election. Republican gain.	✓ Toby Roth (Republican) 57.9%; Robert John Cornell (Democratic) 42.1%
Wisconsin 9	Bob Kasten	Republican	1974	Incumbent retired to run for Governor of Wisconsin. Republican hold.	✓ Jim Sensenbrenner (Republican) 61.2%; Matthew J. Flynn (Democratic) 38.8%

== Wyoming ==
District	Incumbent	Party	First elected	Result	Candidates
Wyoming at-large	Teno Roncalio	Democratic	1964; 1966 (retired); 1970	Incumbent retired. Republican gain.	✓ Dick Cheney (Republican) 58.6%; William D. Bagley (Democratic) 41.4%

== See also ==
- 1978 United States elections
  - 1978 United States gubernatorial elections
  - 1978 United States Senate elections
- 95th United States Congress
- 96th United States Congress

== Works cited ==
- Abramson, Paul; Aldrich, John; Rohde, David (1995). Change and Continuity in the 1992 Elections. CQ Press. ISBN 0871878399.
