= COHS =

COHS may refer to:

== Education ==
- Cardinal O'Hara High School (Springfield, Pennsylvania), United States
- Cardinal O'Hara High School (Tonawanda, New York), United States
- Coldspring-Oakhurst High School, Coldspring, Texas, United States
- Cosumnes Oaks High School, Elk Grove, California, United States
- Texas Tech University College of Human Sciences, Lubbock, Texas, United States

== Other uses ==
- Controlled ovarian hyperstimulation, a technique in assisted reproduction
