= Cape Royale, Texas =

- Unincorporated community & census-designated place
- Interactive map of Cape Royale, Texas
- Coordinates: 30°39′11″N 95°7′36″W
- Country: United States
- State: Texas
- County: San Jacinto

Area
  - Total: 3.7 sq mi (9.6 km^{2})
  - Land: 2.0 sq mi (5.2 km^{2})
  - Water: 1.7 sq mi (4.4 km^{2})

Population (2010)
  - Total: 670
  - Density: 340/sq mi (130/km^{2})
- Time zone: UTC-6 (Central (CST))
  - Summer (DST): UTC-5 (CDT)
- ZIP code: 77331
- FIPS code: 48-12600

Cape Royale is a census-designated place and unincorporated community in San Jacinto County, Texas, United States. As of the 2020 census, Cape Royale had a population of 657. Prior to the 2010 census Cape Royale and Oakhurst CDPs were part of Oakhurst city, which has been disincorporated.

== Geography ==
Cape Royale is located at 30°39′11″N 95°7′36″W (30.653043, -95.126539).

== Demographics ==
Historical population
Census	Pop.	Note	%±
2010	670		—
2020	657		−1.9%
U.S. Decennial Census; 1850–1900 1910; 1920 1930 1940; 1950 1960 1970; 1980 1990 2000; 2010 2020

Cape Royale first appeared as a census designated place in the 2010 U.S. census.

=== 2020 census ===
Cape Royale CDP, Texas – Racial and ethnic composition Note: the US Census treats Hispanic/Latino as an ethnic category. This table excludes Latinos from the racial categories and assigns them to a separate category. Hispanics/Latinos may be of any race.
Race / Ethnicity (NH = Non-Hispanic)	Pop 2010	Pop 2020	% 2010	% 2020
White alone (NH)	611	588	91.19%	89.50%
Black or African American alone (NH)	20	17	2.99%	2.59%
Native American or Alaska Native alone (NH)	5	2	0.75%	0.30%
Asian alone (NH)	0	1	0.00%	0.15%
Native Hawaiian or Pacific Islander alone (NH)	0	0	0.00%	0.00%
Other race alone (NH)	0	3	0.00%	0.46%
Mixed race or Multiracial (NH)	4	21	0.60%	3.20%
Hispanic or Latino (any race)	30	25	4.48%	3.81%
Total	670	657	100.00%	100.00%

== Education ==
The school district is Coldspring-Oakhurst Consolidated Independent School District.
