= Edward Henneberry =

American sheriff

Middlesex County Sheriff
- In office January 7, 1981 – November 18, 1984
- Preceded by: John J. Buckley
- Succeeded by: John P. McGonigle

Personal details
- Born: January 27, 1935 Boston
- Died: November 18, 1984 (aged 49) Weymouth, Massachusetts
- Resting place: Edgell Grove Cemetery; Framingham, Massachusetts
- Party: Democratic
- Education: Boston College

Edward F. Henneberry Jr. (January 27, 1935 – November 18, 1984) was an American law enforcement officer and politician who served as sheriff of Middlesex County, Massachusetts from 1981 to 1984.

== Early life ==
Henneberry was born in Boston and raised in Brighton. He graduated from Saint Columbkille's School in 1952. From 1954 to 1956 he served in the United States Army in South Korea. He graduated from Boston College in 1959 and attended Boston University Law School.

== Career ==
In 1965, Henneberry was appointed a deputy sheriff by Middlesex County sheriff Howard W. Fitzpatrick. In 1974 he was named chief civil deputy sheriff of Middlesex County. In 1980, sheriff John J. Buckley decided not to run for reelection and Henneberry entered the race to succeed him. Henneberry, a Democrat, was endorsed by Buckley, a liberal Republican and was seen as the leading candidate in the eight-candidate Democratic primary. Henneberry won the primary with 29% of the vote – 12% more than his nearest competitor, Somerville Board of Aldermen chairman Vincent P. Ciampa. He defeated Republican Philip T. Razook in the general election 73% to 27%. On November 18, 1984, Henneberry suffered a heart attack while visiting relatives in Hanover, Massachusetts and died in South Shore Hospital in Weymouth, Massachusetts. He was 49 years old.
