= Oakhurst, Texas =

- Unincorporated community & census-designated place
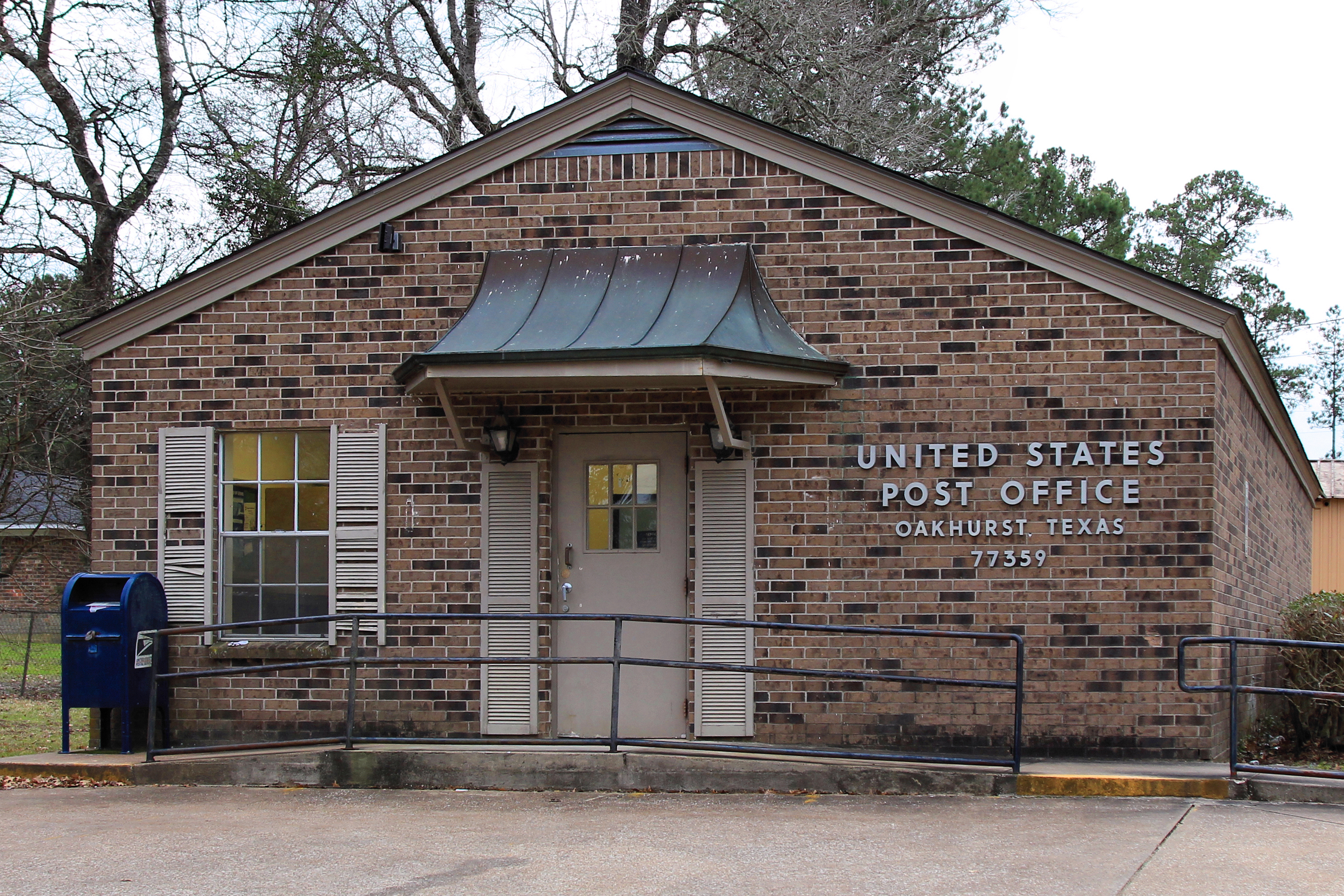
- The United States Post Office in Oakhurst

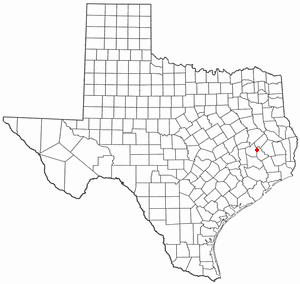
- Location of Oakhurst, Texas
- Coordinates: 30°44′26″N 95°18′38″W
- Country: United States
- State: Texas
- County: San Jacinto

Area
  - Total: 1.6 sq mi (4.1 km^{2})
  - Land: 1.6 sq mi (4.1 km^{2})
  - Water: 0 sq mi (0.0 km^{2})
- Elevation: 390 ft (119 m)

Population (2010)
  - Total: 233
  - Density: 150/sq mi (57/km^{2})
- Time zone: UTC-6 (Central (CST))
  - Summer (DST): UTC-5 (CDT)
- ZIP code: 77359
- Area code: 936
- FIPS code: 48-52992
- GNIS feature ID: 1382413

Oakhurst is a census-designated place and unincorporated community in San Jacinto County, Texas, United States. As of the 2020 census, Oakhurst had a population of 148. Prior to the 2010 census Oakhurst and Cape Royale CDPs were part of Oakhurst city, which has been disincorporated.

== Geography ==
Oakhurst is located at 30°44′26″N 95°18′38″W (30.740538, -95.310563).

According to the United States Census Bureau, the city had a total area of 1.6 square miles (4.1 km^{2}), all land.

== Demographics ==
Historical population
Census	Pop.	Note	%±
1990	219		—
2000	230		5.0%
2010	233		1.3%
2020	148		−36.5%
U.S. Decennial Census; 1850–1900 1910; 1920 1930 1940; 1950 1960 1970; 1980 1990 2000; 2010 2020

Oakhurst first appeared as a city in the 1990 U.S. census; and as a census designated place in the 2010 U.S. census.

Oakhurst CDP, Texas – Racial and ethnic composition Note: the US Census treats Hispanic/Latino as an ethnic category. This table excludes Latinos from the racial categories and assigns them to a separate category. Hispanics/Latinos may be of any race.
Race / Ethnicity (NH = Non-Hispanic)	Pop 2000	Pop 2010	Pop 2020	% 2000	% 2010	% 2020
White alone (NH)	188	192	110	81.74%	82.40%	74.32%
Black or African American alone (NH)	34	30	20	14.78%	12.88%	13.51%
Native American or Alaska Native alone (NH)	0	0	0	0.00%	0.00%	0.00%
Asian alone (NH)	0	0	2	0.00%	0.00%	1.35%
Native Hawaiian or Pacific Islander alone (NH)	0	0	0	0.00%	0.00%	0.00%
Other race alone (NH)	0	0	1	0.00%	0.00%	0.68%
Mixed race or Multiracial (NH)	1	2	12	0.43%	0.86%	8.11%
Hispanic or Latino (any race)	7	9	3	3.04%	3.86%	2.03%
Total	230	233	148	100.00%	100.00%	100.00%

=== 2000 census ===
As of the census of 2000, there were 230 people, 85 households, and 66 families residing in the city. The population density was 146.5 inhabitants per square mile (56.6/km^{2}). There were 115 housing units at an average density of 73.3 per square mile (28.3/km^{2}). The racial makeup of the city was 84.78% White, 14.78% African American, and 0.43% from two or more races. Hispanic or Latino of any race were 3.04% of the population.

There were 85 households, out of which 32.9% had children under the age of 18 living with them, 64.7% were married couples living together, 10.6% had a female householder with no husband present, and 21.2% were non-families. 17.6% of all households were made up of individuals, and 7.1% had someone living alone who was 65 years of age or older. The average household size was 2.71 and the average family size was 3.06.

In the city the population was spread out, with 27.8% under the age of 18, 8.7% from 18 to 24, 19.1% from 25 to 44, 31.3% from 45 to 64, and 13.0% who were 65 years of age or older. The median age was 39 years. For every 100 females, there were 103.5 males. For every 100 females age 18 and over, there were 90.8 males.

The median income for a household in the city was $39,167, and the median income for a family was $40,909. Males had a median income of $31,875 versus $35,417 for females. The per capita income for the city was $15,987. About 5.0% of families and 17.8% of the population were below the poverty line, including 26.8% of those under the age of eighteen and 30.8% of those 65 or over.

== Notable person ==
- W. Marvin Watson, who served as U. S. Postmaster General, White House Appointments Secretary and then as White House Chief of Staff under President Lyndon B. Johnson, was born in Oakhurst in 1924.

== Education ==
Oakhurst is served by the Coldspring-Oakhurst Consolidated Independent School District.
