= W. Marvin Watson =

American politician (1924–2017)

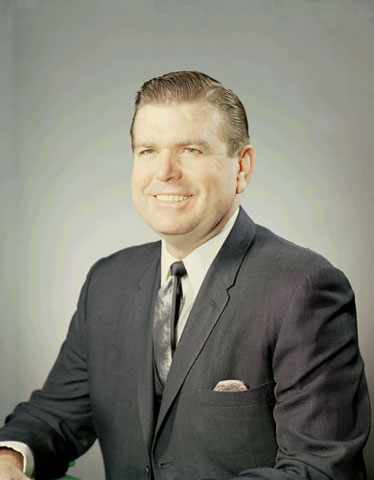

61st United States Postmaster General
- In office April 26, 1968 – January 20, 1969
- President: Lyndon B. Johnson
- Preceded by: Larry O'Brien
- Succeeded by: Winton M. Blount

White House Chief of Staff
- De facto
- In office June 1, 1966 – April 26, 1968
- President: Lyndon B. Johnson
- Preceded by: Jack Valenti (de facto)
- Succeeded by: James R. Jones (de facto)

White House Appointments Secretary
- In office February 1, 1965 – April 26, 1968
- President: Lyndon B. Johnson
- Preceded by: Jack Valenti
- Succeeded by: James R. Jones

Personal details
- Born: William Marvin Watson; June 6, 1924 Oakhurst, Texas, U.S.
- Died: November 26, 2017 (aged 93) The Woodlands, Texas, U.S.
- Party: Democratic
- Education: Baylor University (BA, MA)

Military service
- Allegiance: United States
- Branch/service: United States Marine Corps
- Battles/wars: World War II

William Marvin Watson (June 6, 1924 – November 26, 2017) was an advisor to U.S. president Lyndon B. Johnson and was Postmaster General from April 26, 1968, to January 20, 1969.

== Life and career ==
Watson was born in Oakhurst, Texas. He received a bachelor's degree in economics and an M.B.A. from Baylor University, which he initially attended on a music scholarship.

Watson entered the United States Marine Corps during World War II and saw action in the Pacific campaign during the later stage of the war. He began working for Johnson during the 1948 primary campaign for the Democratic nomination to run for the United States Senate. At that time, there was no noteworthy Republican Party in Texas, so the primary would effectively decide the election.

Watson continued being active in local politics as a "Johnson Man," rising to become the head of the Democratic Party in Texas. In 1960, he both helped organize the Kennedy/Johnson campaign in Texas while also working directly for Johnson as an aide while campaigning across the United States. During Johnson's years as both a senator as well as vice president, he repeatedly asked Watson to join his staff, but Watson declined, preferring the freedom of remaining an independent adviser to LBJ, rather than an employee.

Johnson called upon Watson to help organize the 1964 Democratic Convention in Atlantic City, New Jersey. Watson found it necessary to remove many Kennedy family loyalists from the convention staff, as he became convinced that they were working to either force Johnson to accept Robert F. Kennedy as his running mate, or else stampede the delegates to have RFK nominated for the presidency instead of Johnson.

Watson became the White House Chief of Staff in all but name as White House Appointments Secretary to Johnson in 1965, helping to coordinate passage of much of the Great Society domestic agenda. In this position, his workday frequently began shortly after 6:00 in the morning, and he routinely didn't return home for the day until midnight or later; even during his off hours, he remained on call, and quite often found himself back at his desk in the White House on Sundays in order to deal with sudden issues. He was appointed Postmaster General in 1968, and was the last surviving cabinet-level Postmaster General at the time of his death.

After the end of the Johnson administration in 1969, Watson became an official with Armand Hammer's Occidental Petroleum, working with Armand Hammer. He had been offered the U.S. ambassadorship to Australia by Richard Nixon, but declined so as to be able to spend more time with his family.

Watson delivered a eulogy at Johnson's state funeral in January 1973, emphasizing Johnson's unswerving dedication to the betterment of America.

Watson served as the president of Dallas Baptist College (now Dallas Baptist University) from 1979 to 1987.

Watson died on November 26, 2017, at the age of 93. He was buried at the Texas State Cemetery.

== In popular culture ==
Watson, played by Martin McDougall, was featured in the second episode of season 3 in the Netflix series The Crown.

Political offices
| Preceded by Jack Valenti | White House Appointments Secretary; 1965–1968 | Succeeded by James R. Jones |
| Preceded by Jack Valenti; De facto | White House Chief of Staff; De facto 1966–1968 | Succeeded by James R. Jones |
| Preceded by Larry O'Brien | United States Postmaster General; 1968–1969 | Succeeded by Winton Blount |
