= John P. McGonigle =

American sheriff (1938–2022)

John McGonigle

Sheriff of Middlesex County, Massachusetts
- In office 1985–1994
- Preceded by: Edward Henneberry
- Succeeded by: Brad Bailey

Personal details
- Born: 1938 Everett, Massachusetts
- Died: October 27, 2022 (aged 84) Wakefield, Massachusetts
- Party: Democratic
- Occupation: Social worker Probation officer Sheriff

John Patrick McGonigle (1938 – 2022) was an American law enforcement officer and politician who served as Sheriff of Middlesex County, Massachusetts from 1985 to 1994. He was convicted of tax evasion and pleaded guilty to conspiracy to commit racketeering for demanding kickbacks from two of his deputies.

== Early life ==
McGonigle graduated from Boston College in 1960 with a bachelor's degree in business administration. He earned a bachelor's degree in social work from Simmons College in 1971. He then received a master's in counseling and psychology from BC in 1976.

== Career ==
McGonigle worked as a juvenile probation officer, rising to the position of assistant chief probation officer of the Cambridge District Court. On January 10, 1985, Governor Michael Dukakis appointed McGonigle to fill the unexpired term of Middlesex County Sheriff Edward Henneberry, who died the month prior. McGonigle, who had never run for public office, was a surprise choice for the position. Dukakis said that the response to McGonigle's candidacy was the most "universally positive" he had seen in his six years as governor and added that he could not find anyone “who doesn't think John McGonigle is not a first rate person". McGonigle was sworn in on January 18, 1985. McGonigle was elected to a full six-year term in 1986, defeating former State Trooper Henry Sullivan 67% to 33%.

== Criminal conviction ==
In March 1993, The Boston Globe reported that two friends of McGonigle who were figures in a 1988 state investigation of no-show jobs had been hired by McGonigle as deputy sheriffs. On March 18, the Federal Bureau of Investigation seized documents from the three Middlesex County deputy sheriff's offices. On April 8, 1994, McGonigle was indicted on federal charges including racketeering, extortion, conspiracy and filing false tax returns. Prosecutors alleged that between 1986 and 1991, McGonigle extorted $350 a week from his chief deputies.

On April 13, Governor William Weld and Attorney General Scott Harshbarger suspended McGonigle without pay. Weld appointed assistant secretary of public safety and former state representative Robert C. Krekorian as acting sheriff. McGonigle challenged Weld's authority to suspend him. The Massachusetts Supreme Judicial Court found that neither Weld nor Scott Harshbarger had the authority to suspend McGonigle and McGonigle returned to office on July 1, 1994. However, later that day, Chief Justice Paul J. Liacos ordered McGonigle to stay out of office until after the Court ruled on whether or not McGonigle should be permanently removed as sheriff.

On October 12, 1994, McGonigle was found guilty of tax evasion for failing to report money he received from deputy sheriffs. A mistrial was declared on extortion and racketeering charges, as one juror held out against conviction. On December 5, 1994, McGonigle pleaded guilty to conspiracy to commit racketeering. As part of a plea agreement, three counts of extortion were dismissed. On February 8, 1995, he was sentenced to 57-months in prison and fined $10,000. He reported to the minimum-security Federal Correctional Institution, Allenwood in May 1995.

On October 21, 2002, the Boston Herald published an article reporting that numerous former public officials that had been convicted of crimes related to their duties, including McGonigle, were receiving pensions in violation of state law. On November 6, 2002, the Massachusetts Attorney General's office ordered the Middlesex County Retirement Board to immediately stop McGonigle's pension benefits. On February 6, 2003, the Middlesex County Retirement Board voted to strip McGonigle of his pension.
