= Coldspring-Oakhurst Consolidated Independent School District =

School district in Texas, United States

Address
- 14210 Highway 150 West Coldspring, Texas, 77331; United States

District information
- Type: Public
- Grades: PK–12
- Schools: 4
- NCES District ID: 4814520

Students and staff
- Students: 1,626 (2023–2024)
- Teachers: 109.40 (on an FTE basis) (2023–2024)
- Staff: 159.92 (on an FTE basis) (2023–2024)
- Student–teacher ratio: 14.86 (2023–2024)

Other information
- Website: www.cocisd.org

Coldspring-Oakhurst Consolidated Independent School District is a public school district based in Coldspring, Texas, United States.

In addition to Coldspring, the district also serves the cities of Oakhurst and Point Blank.

In 2009, the school district was rated "academically acceptable" by the Texas Education Agency.

== Schools ==
- Coldspring-Oakhurst High School (grades 9-12)
- Lincoln Junior High (grades 6-8)
- Coldspring-Oakhurst Intermediate (grades 3-5)
- Street Elementary (prekindergarten - grade 2)
