= John J. Buckley (sheriff) =

American politician

Middlesex County Sheriff
- In office 1970–1980
- Preceded by: Howard W. Fitzpatrick
- Succeeded by: Edward Henneberry

Personal details
- Born: August 12, 1929
- Died: March 20, 1994 (aged 64)
- Party: Democratic (before 1964); Republican (1964–1994)

John J. Buckley III (August 12, 1929 - March 20, 1994) was an American politician who served as Sheriff of Middlesex County Massachusetts from 1970 to 1980.

== Early life ==
Buckley graduated from Malden High School and went on to earn a business degree at Boston College. He left the business world to attend Saint John's Seminary, which he left after two years when he changed his mind about becoming a priest. Buckley then worked as a publishers representative until he entered politics.

== Early political career ==
In 1964, Buckley switched from the Democratic Party to the Republican Party when he joined Elliot Richardson's campaign for Lieutenant Governor of Massachusetts. In 1966, Buckley was the Republican nominee for Massachusetts State Auditor. He lost to incumbent Democrat Thaddeus M. Buczko 57% to 42%.

== Sheriff ==
Buckley was appointed sheriff on April 10, 1970, by governor Francis W. Sargent following the death of Howard W. Fitzpatrick. He defeated John F. Dever, Jr. in a special election to complete Fitzpatrick's term. He was elected to a full term in 1974, defeating Walter J. Sullivan 51% to 49%.

During his tenure, Buckley gained national attention for his stands against the death penalty, support for vocational training and rehabilitation programs for inmates, support for gun control laws, and the elimination of violence on prime-time television. A liberal Republican, Buckley was known for his progressive approach to corrections. During his first year in office, Buckley posed as an inmate for two days in an out-of-state prison, eliminated censorship of inmate mail, allowed inmates to use the sheriff's house on the grounds of the Middlesex House of Correction for conjugal visits, and sued his own office to eliminate the law that allowed juveniles to be jailed with adult criminals. He also took a stance against county government, which he called "a patronage ridden system" and "an anachronism".

== 1978 elections ==
On February 6, 1978, Buckley announced his candidacy for Governor of Massachusetts. At the Republican Convention, Buckley finished third on the first ballot behind Edward F. King and Francis W. Hatch, Jr. 212 votes to King's 898 and Hatch's 874. Buckley then dropped out of the race and attempted to move his delegates to Hatch, however the nomination was won by the conservative King on the second ballot. Although he withdrew at the convention he still considered running in the primary. However, on May 17 Buckley officially exited the governor's race.

After withdrawing from the governor's race, Buckley entered the race for the United States House of Representatives seat in Massachusetts's 5th congressional district, which was being vacated by Paul Tsongas. He defeated Nicholas D. Rizzo 54% to 46% in the Republican primary. In the general election, Buckley lost to Democrat James Shannon 52% to 28%, with independent James J. Gaffney, III receiving 20% of the vote.

Buckley chose not to run for reelection in 1980.

== Death ==
Buckley died on March 20, 1994, at his home in Belmont, Massachusetts, of brain cancer. He was survived by his wife, Judge Marie Buckley, and his two sons.

Party political offices
Preceded by Elwynn Miller	Republican nominee for Auditor of Massachusetts; 1966	Succeeded by Frank P. Bucci
