= James R. Jones =

American politician (born 1939)

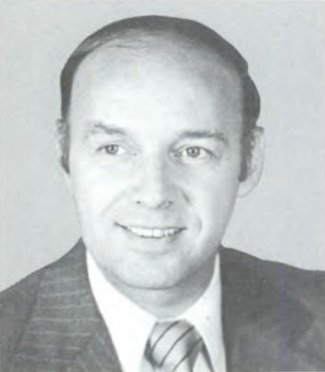

United States Ambassador to Mexico
- In office September 10, 1993 – June 25, 1997
- President: Bill Clinton
- Preceded by: John Negroponte
- Succeeded by: Jeffrey Davidow

Chair of the House Budget Committee
- In office January 3, 1981 – January 3, 1985
- Preceded by: Robert Giaimo
- Succeeded by: William H. Gray III

Member of the U.S. House of Representatives from Oklahoma's 1st district
- In office January 3, 1973 – January 3, 1987
- Preceded by: Page Belcher
- Succeeded by: Jim Inhofe

White House Chief of Staff
- De facto
- In office April 26, 1968 – January 20, 1969
- President: Lyndon B. Johnson
- Preceded by: W. Marvin Watson (de facto)
- Succeeded by: H. R. Haldeman

White House Appointments Secretary
- In office April 26, 1968 – January 20, 1969
- President: Lyndon B. Johnson
- Preceded by: W. Marvin Watson
- Succeeded by: Dwight Chapin

Personal details
- Born: James Robert Jones; May 5, 1939 (age 87) Muskogee, Oklahoma, U.S.
- Party: Democratic
- Education: University of Oklahoma (BA); Georgetown University (LLB)

Military service
- Allegiance: United States
- Branch/service: United States Army
- Years of service: 1964–1965 (active); 1961–1968 (reserve)
- Rank: Captain
- Unit: Army Intelligence Corps; Army Reserve

James Robert Jones (born May 5, 1939) is an American lawyer, diplomat, Democratic politician, a retired U.S. congressman from Oklahoma, and a former U.S. ambassador to Mexico under President Bill Clinton.

Jones grew up in Muskogee, Oklahoma, and was involved in politics at an early age. He worked as a legislative assistant to U.S. Representative Ed Edmondson and as Appointments Secretary to U.S. President Lyndon B. Johnson.

In 1972, after returning to Oklahoma, Jones ran for Oklahoma's 1st congressional district. He won and was re-elected six times. During his tenure in Congress, which lasted until 1987, Jones served four years as the Chairman of the House Budget Committee.

== Early life and career ==
Jones was born and educated in Muskogee, Oklahoma. By the age of 12, Jones was campaigning for Ed Edmondson's bid for Congress. He received his B.A. degree in 1961 from the University of Oklahoma, where he also joined Lambda Chi Alpha fraternity. Jones was accepted at Georgetown University Law Center (in Washington, D.C.) and graduated with an LL.B. in 1964.

Jones enlisted and served in the U.S. Army Reserve (from 1961 to 1968) and also served briefly in the Army Counterintelligence Corps (at the rank of captain, from 1964 to 1965). Jones was also admitted to the Oklahoma bar in 1964 and commenced his practice of law in Tulsa, Oklahoma.

== Political career ==
=== Political staffer ===
Jones's first important political job was as the legislative assistant for Congressman Ed Edmondson (1961–1964). In 1965, Jones moved from Congress to the White House, where he served as Appointments Secretary (and de facto Chief of Staff) to U.S. President Lyndon B. Johnson. At that time, Jones was the youngest person to hold the position of Appointments Secretary.

=== Congressional service ===
After Johnson left office, Jones returned to Oklahoma and resumed his law practice in Tulsa. In 1970, he ran against 10-term incumbent Republican Page Belcher in Oklahoma's 1st congressional district. He gave Belcher only his second credible reelection contest ever, holding him to 55 percent of the vote—a surprisingly close margin, considering that Belcher was ranking member of the House Agriculture Committee.

Jones was priming for a rematch in 1972, but Belcher didn't have the stomach for another bruising contest and pulled out of the race in June. The Republicans recruited Tulsa Mayor Jim Hewgley as a replacement. However, Jones won the November election by a fairly convincing 11-point margin—a surprising result, considering that Richard Nixon easily carried the 1st in the presidential election (Nixon won Tulsa County with a staggering 78 percent of the vote). Jones is the first and only Democrat to have represented Tulsa in Congress since Dixie Gilmer left office in 1951; he was re-elected six times, serving until January 1987.

As a member of the tax-writing Ways and Means Committee, Jones secured House backing for a conservative tax cut in 1978. In 1979, he joined the House Budget Committee. Jones also was able to get Democrats to add more fiscal conservatives to the Budget Committee.

Jones decided to give up his House seat in 1986 to run against Republican incumbent Senator Don Nickles, even though he'd only narrowly defeated future governor Frank Keating two years earlier for reelection to his House seat. He lost to Nickles by 10 points.

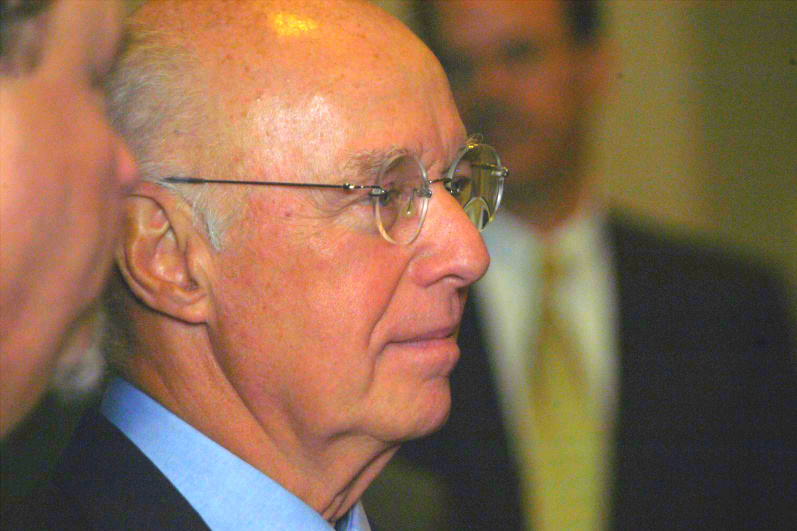
Jones in 2010

== Work after Congress ==
In 1987, Jones resumed the practice of law, joining the Washington-based firm of Dickstein Shapiro. He later served as the Chairman of the American Stock Exchange (1989 to 1993). After the election of Democratic President Bill Clinton, Jones was appointed the U.S. Ambassador to Mexico and served from 1993 until 1997. In February, 2003, he was inaugurated Chairman of the World Affairs Councils of America.

Presently, Jones is a resident of Tulsa and Washington, D.C. He is a partner in the law firm Manatt, Phelps & Phillips. He also serves on the board of directors of the Committee for a Responsible Federal Budget. Jones also is a member of the advisory board for the Mexico Institute.

In 1994, Jones was inducted into the Oklahoma Hall of Fame.

=== The Constitution Project ===
Jones agreed to serve on The Constitution Project's Guantanamo Task Force in December 2010.

== See also ==
- Politics of Oklahoma
- Oklahoma Democratic Party
- Oklahoma Congressional Districts
- United States Ambassador to Mexico

Political offices
Preceded by W. Marvin Watson; De facto	White House Chief of Staff; De facto 1968–1969	Succeeded by H. R. Haldeman
Preceded by W. Marvin Watson; De facto	White House Appointments Secretary; 1968–1969	Succeeded by Dwight Chapin
U.S. House of Representatives
Preceded by Page Belcher	Member of the U.S. House of Representatives from Oklahoma's 1st congressional district 1973–1987	Succeeded by Jim Inhofe
Preceded by Robert Giaimo	Chair of the House Budget Committee; 1981–1985	Succeeded by William H. Gray III
Party political offices
Preceded by Andy Coats	Democratic nominee for U.S. Senator from Oklahoma (Class 3); 1986	Succeeded by Steve Lewis
Diplomatic posts
Preceded by John Negroponte	United States Ambassador to Mexico; 1993–1997	Succeeded by Jeffrey Davidow
U.S. order of precedence (ceremonial)
Preceded by Jim Matheson as Former U.S. Representative	Order of precedence of the United States as Former U.S. Representative	Succeeded by Dave McCurdy as Former U.S. Representative
