= South Shore Hospital =

Geography
- Location: 55 Fogg Road, Weymouth, Massachusetts, United States
- Coordinates: 42.1758°N 70.9542°W

Services
- Emergency department: Level II Trauma Center
- Beds: 396

History
- Opened: 1922

Links
- Website: www.southshorehealth.org/locations/south-shore-hospital
- Lists: Hospitals in Massachusetts

South Shore Hospital is a 396-bed hospital located in Weymouth, Massachusetts. It is the only community hospital within the state that operates a Level III neonatal intensive care unit. It is also one of two hospitals in Massachusetts with a Level II designation for adults.

== History ==
The hospital opened in 1922 and was originally named Weymouth Hospital. It was located in a pre-Civil War mansion, in what was once the home of H.B. Reed, a prominent shoe manufacturer. It contained 22 beds, a delivery room, a nursery, an operating room, and an x-ray machine. Within its first six months of operation, the hospital grew too large for the space that was provided by the mansion, and subsequently doubled in size. In 1967, the building was replaced entirely South Shore Hospital was the first private organization in the country that received funding from the Public Works Administration. It was also one of the first community hospitals that offered day surgery and twenty-four hour emergency room staffing. It was the first hospital in New England that integrated and group hospitalization and insurance.

South Shore Hospital has been a clinical affiliate of Brigham & Women's Hospital since 2004. In 2015, Partners HealthCare—the parent of the Brigham—withdrew a proposal to acquire South Shore Hospital amid opposition from then state Attorney General Maura Healey. In 2021, the board of South Shore Health, the owner of the hospital, announced it would continue to serve as an independent health care system for the time being.

== Current Operations ==
The hospital employs 1,063 medical staff members. Its maternity center oversees the delivery of approximately 3,083 infants every year. The surgical team performs 20,020 surgeries per year. In 2018, the hospital reported a total of 29,659 patient discharges.

== Awards and recognition ==
South Shore Hospital has received a federal safety rating of four out of five stars from the Centers for Medicare and Medicaid Services.

In 2018, its cardiac catheterization lab was awarded a gold star from the American Heart Association for adherence to strict performance standards and providing quality treatment to its patients.

The Leapfrog Group has recognized South Shore Hospital as a Top General Hospital. In 2019, the hospital was designated with an "A" safety grade.
