= James J. Gaffney III =

American politician

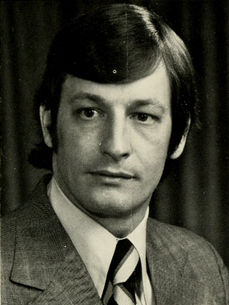

Member of the Massachusetts House of Representatives from the 41st Middlesex District
- In office 1975–1979
- Preceded by: George R. Sprague
- Succeeded by: District eliminated

Personal details
- Born: December 20, 1942 (age 83) Boston
- Party: Independent (1974–1979); Republican (1992)
- Education: Harvard College; Boston University School of Law

James J. "Jay" Gaffney III (December 20, 1942, Boston) is an American attorney and politician who served as a member of the Massachusetts House of Representatives from 1975 to 1979.

== Early life ==
Gaffney was born on December 20, 1942, in Boston. In 1964 he graduated from Harvard College. Gaffney served two tours of duty in the army infantry during the Vietnam War. In 1966 he suffered a debilitating leg injury when he stepped on a land mine. Gaffney later attended and graduated from the Boston University School of Law.

== Political career ==
In 1974, Gaffney was elected to the Massachusetts House of Representatives as an independent. He was reelected in 1976.

In 1978 he ran for the United States House of Representatives seat in Massachusetts's 5th congressional district, which was being vacated by Paul Tsongas. He finished in third place with 19% – behind Democrat James Shannon (52%) and Republican John J. Buckley (28%).

After leaving the House, Gaffney opened a law practice. He works in real estate, personal injury and corporate law.

In 1992 he ran for the Massachusetts Senate as a Republican. He lost to Democrat John D. O'Brien 54% to 46%.
