= Coldspring-Oakhurst High School =

Public school in Texas, United States

Location
- 14100 Texas 150; Coldspring, Texas; 77331; United States; 30.5775°N 95.1375°W

Information
- Type: Public high school
- School district: Coldspring-Oakhurst Consolidated Independent School District
- Superintendent: Leland R. Moore
- President: School Board President Tony Sewell
- Principal: Donna Thompson
- Staff: 39.60 (FTE)
- Enrollment: 499 (2023-2024)
- Student to teacher ratio: 12.60
- Colors: Red, black, and white
- Mascot: Trojan
- Website: cohs.cocisd.org

Coldspring-Oakhurst High School is a public high school located in Coldspring, Texas, United States.

== History ==
Coldspring-Oakhurst High School, "Home of the Fighting Trojans." The school is located in Coldspring, Texas, in the Coldspring-Oakhurst Consolidated Independent School District, which includes three other campuses: Lincoln Jr. High, James Street Elementary, and Coldspring Intermediate. Catalog of Courses includes: English Language Arts, Mathematics, Science, Social Studies, Fine Arts, Languages Other Than English (LOTE), Technology Applications, Physical Education, and Air Force Junior ROTC. Career & Technical Education (CTE) Career Clusters offered include: Agricultural Food & Natural Resources (AFNR), Construction, Arts, AV Technology & Communications, Business & Finance, Education & Training, Health Science, Law & Public Safety, Hospitality and Tourism, Manufacturing, STEM, and Career Preparation.

== Athletics ==
Coldspring-Oakhurst High School (COHS) has the following athletics programs: Football, Volleyball, Basketball, Baseball, Golf, Tennis, Track & Field, and Softball. The COHS football program improved dramatically over the years, moving from 194th in Texas State High School football rankings to top 20 after Coach Kyle Stewart ('06 Football season) helped get the program back up to winning credentials. Under Coach Bryan Barbay, the Trojans qualified for the state championship in 2010 (losing to Carthage 47-22), but that was their only appearance since 1992, when they lost to SLC, 48–0.

== Clubs and organizations ==
COHS clubs and organizations include: National Honor Society, Band, Drill Team, Cheerleading, FCA, HOSA, FBLA, FFA, Floral Design, AFJROTC, FCCLA, and UIL.
