= National Register of Historic Places listings in Taylor County, Texas =

Location of Taylor County in Texas

This is a list of the National Register of Historic Places listings in Taylor County, Texas.

This is intended to be a complete list of the properties and districts on the National Register of Historic Places in Taylor County, Texas. There are five districts and 57 individual properties along with three former properties listed on the National Register in the county. Among these are one State Antiquities Landmark, six Recorded Texas Historic Landmarks, plus an additional RTHL that is a contributing property to a historic district.

This National Park Service list is complete through NPS recent listings posted September 18, 2026.

== Current listings ==
The locations of National Register properties and districts may be seen in a mapping service provided.

	Name on the Register	Image	Date listed	Location	City or town	Description
1	1915 Taylor County Courthouse	1915 Taylor County Courthouse	March 23, 1992 (#92000225)	301 Oak St. 32°26′45″N 99°43′55″W	Abilene	State Antiquities Landmark
2	Abilene and Northern Railway Company Depot	Abilene and Northern Railway Company Depot	May 28, 2004 (#92000191)	189 Locust St. 32°26′51″N 99°43′47″W	Abilene	
3	Abilene Christian College Administration Building	Abilene Christian College Administration Building	March 23, 1992 (#92000193)	Campus Court Dr., Abilene Christian University; 32°28′01″N 99°42′37″W	Abilene	
4	Abilene Commercial Historic District	Abilene Commercial Historic District	December 18, 1991 (#91001811)	Roughly bounded by Hickory, N. 3rd, and Pine Sts. and the southern side of the Missouri Pacific railroad tracks; also 159 and 101 Walnut St. 32°27′01″N 99°44′01″W	Abilene	Includes Recorded Texas Historic Landmark; boundary increases approved December 11, 2020 and May 5, 2023
5	Abilene Courts	Abilene Courts	June 3, 2015 (#15000338)	633 S. 11th St. 32°26′13″N 99°43′51″W	Abilene	
6	Abilene Fire Station No. 2	Abilene Fire Station No. 2	March 23, 1992 (#92000200)	441 Butternut; 32°26′41″N 99°44′15″W	Abilene	
7	Abilene High School	Abilene High School	August 28, 2012 (#12000588)	1699 South 1st Street; 32°26′53″N 99°44′32″W	Abilene	
8	Abilene Street Railway Company Barn	Abilene Street Railway Company Barn	March 23, 1992 (#92000205)	1037 Clinton St. 32°27′41″N 99°44′37″W	Abilene	
9	William and Mary Ackers House	William and Mary Ackers House	March 23, 1992 (#92000214)	802 Mulberry St. 32°27′26″N 99°44′24″W	Abilene	
10	Alexander-Campbell House	Alexander-Campbell House	March 29, 1996 (#96000308)	1546 N. 5th St. 32°27′16″N 99°44′23″W	Abilene	
11	Bankhead Highway Historic District		December 3, 1998 (#98001414)	Approximately 4 mi (6.4 km). sections of former US 80 contained within Taylor County; 32°27′43″N 99°54′21″W	Abilene	
12	Thomas L. Blanton House	Thomas L. Blanton House	March 23, 1992 (#92000234)	3425 S. Seventh St. 32°26′36″N 99°45′59″W	Abilene	
13	Borden Company		April 11, 2024 (#100010209)	309 South Pioneer Drive; 32°26′52″N 99°46′45″W	Abilene	
14	Boyd-Hall House	Boyd-Hall House	March 23, 1992 (#92000229)	502 Poplar St. 32°26′40″N 99°44′22″W	Abilene	
15	Caldwell Hall	Caldwell Hall	March 23, 1992 (#92000206)	Intracampus Dr., Hardin-Simmons University; 32°28′39″N 99°44′07″W	Abilene	
16	W. A. V. Cash House	W. A. V. Cash House	March 23, 1992 (#92000195)	1302 Amarillo; 32°26′04″N 99°44′49″W	Abilene	
17	David S. Castle House	David S. Castle House	March 23, 1992 (#92000218)	1742 N. Second St. 32°27′04″N 99°44′33″W	Abilene	
18	George R. Davis House	George R. Davis House	March 23, 1992 (#92000237)	718 Victoria; 32°27′25″N 99°44′45″W	Abilene	
19	O. D. and Ada Dillingham House	O. D. and Ada Dillingham House	March 23, 1992 (#92000199)	1625 Belmont; 32°25′45″N 99°44′13″W	Abilene	
20	Dodd-Harkrider House	Dodd-Harkrider House	March 23, 1992 (#92000222)	2026 N. Third St. 32°27′11″N 99°44′46″W	Abilene	
21	J. W. Evans House	J. W. Evans House	March 23, 1992 (#92000204)	258 Clinton St. 32°27′09″N 99°44′40″W	Abilene	
22	Federal Building	Federal Building	July 20, 1992 (#92000228)	341 Pine; 32°27′07″N 99°43′55″W	Abilene	
23	Ferguson Hall		September 24, 2026 (#100013427)	2200 Hickory Street; 32°28′34″N 99°44′00″W	Abilene	On the campus of Hardin-Simmons University.
24	Eugene L. Finley House	Eugene L. Finley House	March 23, 1992 (#92000210)	208 Merchant; 32°27′06″N 99°44′35″W	Abilene	
25	First Presbyterian Church	First Presbyterian Church	March 23, 1992 (#92000226)	402 Orange St. 32°27′11″N 99°44′17″W	Abilene	
26	David C. and Docia Fritz House	David C. and Docia Fritz House	March 23, 1992 (#92000215)	1325 N. Eighteenth St. 32°28′11″N 99°44′06″W	Abilene	
27	William J. Fulwiler House		November 26, 2018 (#92000192)	910 Highland St. 32°26′20″N 99°44′58″W	Abilene	
28	Albert S. and Ruth Goodloe House	Albert S. and Ruth Goodloe House	March 23, 1992 (#92000232)	1302 Sayles Blvd. 32°26′00″N 99°44′53″W	Abilene	
29	Roland A. D. Green House	Roland A. D. Green House	March 23, 1992 (#92000207)	1358 Highland St. 32°26′04″N 99°44′54″W	Abilene	
30	J. G. Higginbotham House	J. G. Higginbotham House	March 23, 1992 (#92000236)	2102 Swenson; 32°28′23″N 99°44′27″W	Abilene	
31	Hilton Hotel	Hilton Hotel	December 23, 1993 (#85003658)	986 N. Fourth St. 32°27′10″N 99°43′57″W	Abilene	
32	Ed S. Hughes Company Warehouse		March 23, 1992 (#92000224)	135 Oak St. 32°26′52″N 99°43′56″W	Abilene	
33	A. T. Jones House	A. T. Jones House	March 23, 1992 (#92000212)	418 Merchant; 32°27′15″N 99°44′36″W	Abilene	
34	C. A. Lanius House	C. A. Lanius House	March 23, 1992 (#92000221)	1942 N. Third St. 32°27′11″N 99°44′41″W	Abilene	
35	Luce Hall	Luce Hall	March 23, 1992 (#92000194)	Campus Court Dr., north of Administration Building, Abilene Christian University; 32°27′59″N 99°42′38″W	Abilene	
36	J. D. Magee House	J. D. Magee House	March 23, 1992 (#92000220)	1910 N. Third St. 32°27′11″N 99°44′33″W	Abilene	Recorded Texas Historic Landmark
37	George W. and Lavina McDaniel House	George W. and Lavina McDaniel House	March 23, 1992 (#92000201)	774 Butternut; 32°26′28″N 99°44′17″W	Abilene	
38	McDonald Hall	McDonald Hall	March 23, 1992 (#92000219)	2083 N. Second St. 32°27′05″N 99°44′36″W	Abilene	
39	McMurry College Administration Building	McMurry College Administration Building	March 23, 1992 (#92000209)	Off Hunt, McMurry College; 32°25′45″N 99°45′04″W	Abilene	
40	William A. Minter House	William A. Minter House	March 23, 1992 (#92000198)	340 Beech St. 32°27′08″N 99°44′20″W	Abilene	
41	Charles Motz House	Charles Motz House	March 23, 1992 (#92000216)	1842 N. Fifth St. 32°27′16″N 99°44′36″W	Abilene	
42	Old Taylor County Courthouse and Jail	Old Taylor County Courthouse and Jail	June 9, 1978 (#78002984)	William St. between North and Elm Sts. 32°17′10″N 99°49′36″W	Buffalo Gap	Recorded Texas Historic Landmark
43	Paramount Theater	Paramount Theater	December 27, 1982 (#82001739)	352 Cypress St. 32°27′08″N 99°44′02″W	Abilene	
44	Parramore Historic District	Parramore Historic District	August 29, 1991 (#91001153)	Bounded by Orange, N. 8th, alley between Grape and Mulberry, and N. 7th Sts. 32°27′25″N 99°44′18″W	Abilene	
45	D. D. Parramore House	D. D. Parramore House	March 23, 1992 (#92000230)	542 Poplar St. 32°26′38″N 99°44′18″W	Abilene	
46	Jhules Reading House		March 23, 1992 (#92000231)	421 Reading St. 32°27′13″N 99°44′31″W	Abilene	
47	Nathan J. and Nancy Roberts House		March 23, 1992 (#92000235)	1430 S. Sixth St. 32°26′38″N 99°44′22″W	Abilene	
48	Sacred Heart Catholic Church	Sacred Heart Catholic Church	March 23, 1992 (#92000233)	1633 S. Eighth St. 32°26′27″N 99°44′32″W	Abilene	Recorded Texas Historic Landmark
49	Sayles Boulevard Historic District	Sayles Boulevard Historic District	March 9, 1992 (#92000095)	Roughly bounded by S. Fifth, Meander and S. Tenth Sts. and Highland Ave. 32°26′31″N 99°44′50″W	Abilene	Includes Recorded Texas Historic Landmark
50	Henry Sayles House	Henry Sayles House	June 24, 1976 (#76002069)	642 Sayles Blvd. 32°26′37″N 99°44′53″W	Abilene	Recorded Texas Historic Landmark
51	State Epileptic Colony Historic District		October 30, 1991 (#91001539)	Roughly bounded by S. 24th, Lakeside and Plum, also area roughly bounded by SH 322, FM 1750 and Industrial Blvd. 32°24′45″N 99°42′58″W	Abilene	
52	William and Evla Stith House	William and Evla Stith House	March 23, 1992 (#92000213)	346 Mulberry St. 32°27′09″N 99°44′24″W	Abilene	
53	William and Shirley Swenson House	William and Shirley Swenson House	December 22, 1987 (#87002148)	1726 Swenson Ave. 32°28′10″N 99°44′28″W	Abilene	Recorded Texas Historic Landmark
54	Oscar P. Thomas House	Oscar P. Thomas House	March 23, 1992 (#92000203)	210 Clinton St. 32°27′06″N 99°44′40″W	Abilene	
55	Travis Elementary School and Cafetorium		January 20, 2023 (#100008557)	1101 South 9th St. 32°26′21″N 99°44′13″W	Abilene	
56	U.S. Weather Bureau Building	U.S. Weather Bureau Building	July 8, 1982 (#82004524)	1482 N. 1st St. 32°27′00″N 99°44′20″W	Abilene	Recorded Texas Historic Landmark
57	Universal Manufacturing Company Building	Universal Manufacturing Company Building	March 23, 1992 (#92000208)	150 Locust St. 32°26′51″N 99°43′47″W	Abilene	
58	West Texas Utilities Company Power Plant	West Texas Utilities Company Power Plant	March 23, 1992 (#92000217)	100 Block of N. Second St. 32°27′03″N 99°43′19″W	Abilene	
59	E. D. Williamson House	E. D. Williamson House	March 23, 1992 (#92000202)	641 Chestnut St. 32°26′33″N 99°44′01″W	Abilene	
60	Horace O. Wooten Grocery Company Warehouse	Horace O. Wooten Grocery Company Warehouse	March 23, 1992 (#92000238)	101 Walnut; 32°26′58″N 99°43′51″W	Abilene	
61	Horace O. Wooten House	Horace O. Wooten House	March 23, 1992 (#92000197)	242 Beech St. 32°27′04″N 99°44′20″W	Abilene	
62	Zabloudil-Hendrick House	Zabloudil-Hendrick House	March 23, 1992 (#92000227)	802 Orange St. 32°27′28″N 99°44′15″W	Abilene	

== Former listing ==
	Name on the Register	Image	Date listed	Date removed	Location	City or town	Description
1	Samuel A. Chambers House		March 23, 1992 (#92000211)	December 24, 2013	224 Merchant; 32°27′07″N 99°44′35″W	Abilene	
2	House at 1127 Ash Street		March 23, 1992 (#92000196)	May 8, 2017	1127 Ash St. 32°27′42″N 99°43′36″W	Abilene	
3	James M. Radford Grocery Company Warehouse		March 23, 1992 (#92000223)	May 8, 2017	101 Oak St. 32°26′53″N 99°43′56″W	Abilene	Destroyed by fire on February 20, 2012.

== See also ==
- National Register of Historic Places listings in Texas
- Recorded Texas Historic Landmarks in Taylor County
