= Jim Ned Consolidated Independent School District =

School district in Tuscola, Texas

Location
- Tuscola, Texas; United States

Students and staff
- Students: 1,000 (approximately)

Other information
- Website: https://www.jimned.esc14.net/

Jim Ned Consolidated Independent School District is a school district based in Tuscola, Texas, United States. The district serves about 1,000 students in southeastern Taylor County, including the towns of Tuscola, Buffalo Gap, and Lawn. A small portion of northeastern Runnels County lies within the district. The district is named after the Jim Ned Creek, which runs through all three towns. The creek is named after Jim Ned, who was an Indian cavalry scout for the US Army.

Colt McCoy, the former starting quarterback for the Texas Longhorns, who now plays for the NFL's Arizona Cardinals, graduated from the district's Jim Ned High School.

In 2009, the school district was rated "recognized" by the Texas Education Agency.

== History ==
Due to an overabundance of students in the district schools, the district proposed a bond in 2020. Voters favored the bond, which resulted in the district building an intermediate school. Another bond to increase capacity in the high school was scheduled for 2023.

== Schools ==
- Jim Ned High School (grades 9–12)
- Jim Ned Middle School (grades 7–8)
- Jim Ned Intermediate School (grades 4-6)
- Jim Ned Elementary School – Buffalo Gap Campus (kindergarten-grade 3)
- Jim Ned Elementary School – Lawn Campus (prekindergarten-grade 3)
  - 2006 National Blue Ribbon School
