= Buffalo Gap, Texas =

Town in Taylor County, Texas, United States

- Town
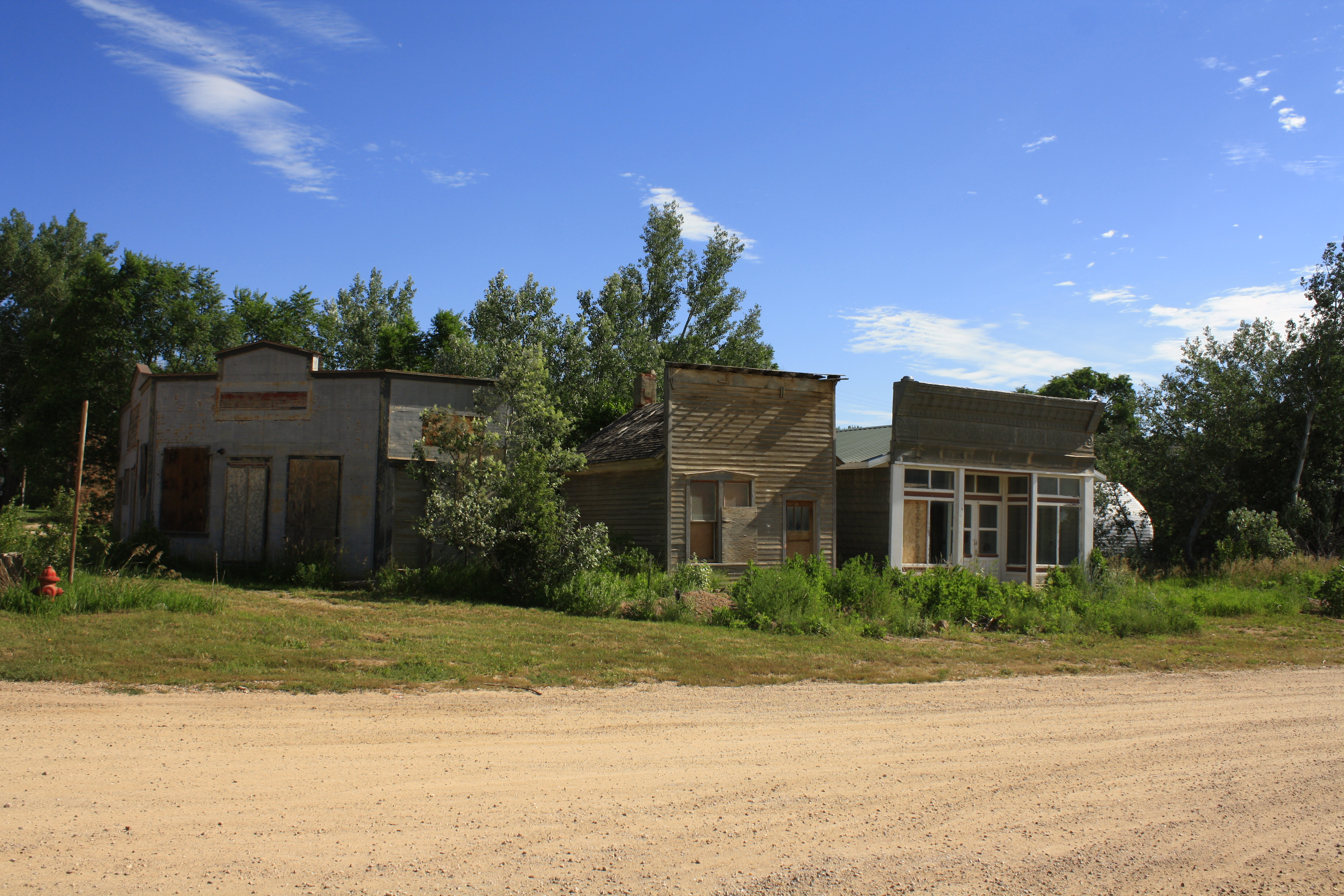
- Buffalo Gap, July 2011
- Interactive map of Buffalo Gap, Texas
- Coordinates: 32°17′00″N 99°50′03″W
- Country: United States
- State: Texas
- County: Taylor

Area
  - Total: 2.43 sq mi (6.30 km^{2})
  - Land: 2.43 sq mi (6.30 km^{2})
  - Water: 0 sq mi (0.00 km^{2})
- Elevation: 1,919 ft (585 m)

Population (2020)
  - Total: 543
  - Density: 223.2/sq mi (86.17/km^{2})
- Time zone: UTC-6 (Central (CST))
  - Summer (DST): UTC-5 (CDT)
- ZIP code: 79508
- Area code: 325
- FIPS code: 48-11128
- GNIS feature ID: 2411741
- Website: www.buffalogaptx.gov

Buffalo Gap is a town in Taylor County, Texas, United States. It is part of the Abilene, Texas Metropolitan Statistical Area. The population was 543 at the 2020 census.

== History ==
Buffalo Gap's roots trace back to the early 1870s, when Buffalo Soldiers arrived to hunt the bison herds migrating from Montana into Texas. The natural gap in the Callahan Divide provided an ideal passage for these herds, giving the town its name and early identity.

According to some sources, Buffalo Gap was founded in 1875—a date proudly displayed on the City Hall reader board. By 1877, the town had grown enough to establish its own post office, with the population reaching 400 by the following year. The town's significance was further recognized when Governor Richard Hubbard declared Buffalo Gap the official county seat of Taylor County on July 3, 1878.

As Buffalo Gap developed, new businesses and institutions emerged, including the construction of a courthouse, hotel, blacksmith shop, general store, newspaper, saloons, stables, and banks. In 1885, Buffalo Gap College opened, marking the town as a thriving center of education and commerce.

However, in 1881, the arrival of the Texas & Pacific railway brought a significant shift. The railroad bypassed Buffalo Gap in favor of the flatter terrain in Abilene, leading to a change in growth and prosperity. While Abilene rapidly expanded, Buffalo Gap's growth slowed. Despite this, the town's residents remained deeply connected to their community.

In the 1920s, the Old Settlers Picnic was established, becoming a cherished tradition that is still celebrated today at the Old Settlers Grounds—a site used for community events and the town's monthly flea market.

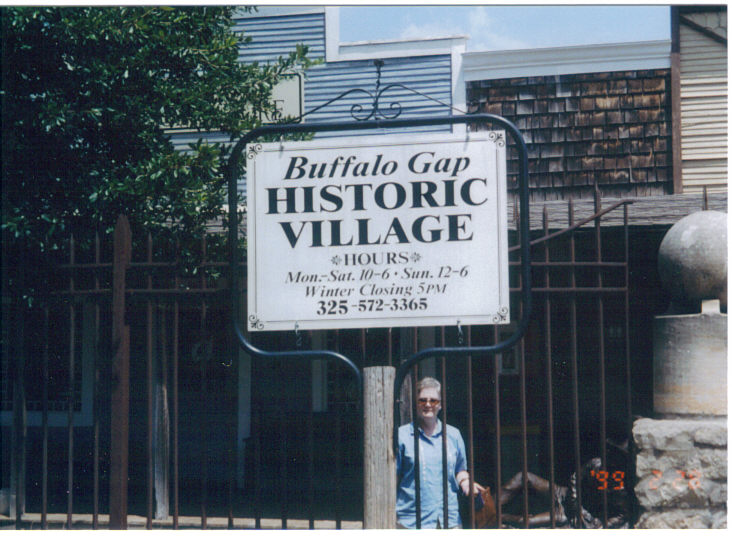
Buffalo Gap Historic Village, July 2008

In 1956, local resident Ernie Wilson purchased the original Taylor County Courthouse and founded the Museum of the Old West, now known as the Buffalo Gap Historic Village. This historical gem preserves the legacy of Buffalo Gap, offering visitors a glimpse into the life and times of the Old West.

In the 1980s, Buffalo Gap made history with its unique Volunteer Fire Department, composed almost entirely of women, with the exception of Fire Chief and Mayor Glenn Johnson. This all-female department exemplified the town's spirit, dedication, and community involvement.

The town was noted in the 1960s and 1970s for its restaurants and the fact that it was one of two "wet" spots in Taylor County where alcoholic beverages could be sold. Deutschlander Freshwater Catfish Company and the Bar B Q Barn operated nearby, but have since closed.

The Shades of Hope Treatment Center in Buffalo Gap specializes in the treatment of eating disorders, and has been featured on The Oprah Winfrey Show.

== Geography ==
According to the United States Census Bureau, the town has a total area of 2.4 square miles (6.3 km^{2}), all land.

== Demographics ==
=== 2020 census ===
Buffalo Gap racial composition (NH = Non-Hispanic) (Note: Note: the US Census treats Hispanic/Latino as an ethnic category. This table excludes Latinos from the racial categories and assigns them to a separate category. Hispanics/Latinos can be of any race.)
Race	Number	Percentage
White (NH)	462	85.27%
Black or African American (NH)	8	1.47%
Native American or Alaska Native (NH)	1	0.18%
Asian (NH)	2	0.37%
Some Other Race (NH)	2	0.37%
Mixed/Multi-Racial (NH)	21	3.87%
Hispanic or Latino	46	8.47%
Total	543	

As of the 2020 United States census, there were 543 people, 222 households, and 158 families residing in the town.

=== 2000 census ===
Historical population
Census	Pop.	Note	%±
1960	316		—
1970	320		1.3%
1980	387		20.9%
1990	499		28.9%
2000	463		−7.2%
2010	464		0.2%
2020	543		17.0%
U.S. Decennial Census

As of the census of 2000, there were 463 people, 194 households, and 140 families residing in the town. The population density was 201.7 inhabitants per square mile (77.9/km^{2}). There were 235 housing units at an average density of 102.4 per square mile (39.5/km^{2}). The racial makeup of the town was 96.76% White, 0.22% African American, 0.22% Native American, 0.22% Asian, 0.65% from other races, and 1.94% from two or more races. Hispanic or Latino of any race were 3.24% of the population.

There were 194 households, out of which 29.4% had children under the age of 18 living with them, 53.6% were married couples living together, 16.0% had a female householder with no husband present, and 27.8% were non-families. 26.3% of all households were made up of individuals, and 10.8% had someone living alone who was 65 years of age or older. The average household size was 2.31 and the average family size was 2.77.

In the town, the population was spread out, with 23.8% under the age of 18, 6.3% from 18 to 24, 23.1% from 25 to 44, 30.5% from 45 to 64, and 16.4% who were 65 years of age or older. The median age was 43 years. For every 100 females, there were 80.2 males. For every 100 females age 18 and over, there were 76.5 males.

The median income for a household in the town was $31,875, and the median income for a family was $34,886. Males had a median income of $26,875 versus $20,500 for females. The per capita income for the town was $14,680. About 6.6% of families and 12.6% of the population were below the poverty line, including 16.5% of those under age 18 and 12.3% of those age 65 or above.

== Education ==
The towns of Tuscola, Lawn, and Buffalo Gap are served by the Jim Ned Consolidated Independent School District based in Tuscola.

== Sports ==
Buffalo Gap is the hometown of University of Texas quarterback Colt McCoy. McCoy lived on a ten-acre spread in Buffalo Gap during his years as the quarterback for Jim Ned High School. His high school coach was his father, Brad McCoy.

During various Super Bowl games of the 1990s, Buffalo Gap experienced "official" name changes, including sign modifications, to show support for the regional Dallas Cowboys. The similarly named city of Buffalo in Leon County in East Texas did likewise.

== Notable people ==
- Oliver Lee, marshal, rancher, and gunman. Namesake to Oliver Lee Memorial State Park
- Rawghlie Clement Stanford, governor of Arizona from 1937 to 1939
- Aaron Watson, independent country artist. First artist to have a #1 album in country music without a major record label

== See also ==
- List of municipalities in Texas
