= Jim Ned High School =

Location
- 9th & Garza; Tuscola, Texas 79562; United States; 32.2138°N 99.7967°W

Information
- Type: Public
- School district: Jim Ned Consolidated Independent School District
- Principal: Richard Payne
- Staff: 40.32 (FTE)
- Grades: 9-12
- Enrollment: 461 (2023–2024)
- Student to teacher ratio: 11.43
- Colors: Red & White
- Athletics conference: UIL Class 3A
- Mascot: Indian
- Website: Jim Ned High School

Jim Ned High School is a public high school located in Tuscola, Texas, United States and is classified as a 3A school by the UIL. It is part of the Jim Ned Consolidated Independent School District, which also includes Lawn Elementary, Buffalo Gap Elementary and Jim Ned Middle School. The high school serves around 400 students from roughly 380 square miles in southeastern Taylor County, including the towns of Tuscola, Buffalo Gap, and Lawn. A small portion of northeastern Runnels County lies within the district, also. The district and the school are both named after the Jim Ned Creek, which runs through all three towns. The creek is named after Jim Ned, who was an Indian cavalry scout for the United States Army. In 2015, the school was rated "Met Standard" by the Texas Education Agency.

== History ==
A bond to increase capacity in the high school was scheduled for 2023.

== Athletics ==
The Jim Ned Indians compete in: cross-country, volleyball, football, basketball, powerlifting, golf, tennis, track, softball, baseball.

=== State titles ===
- Cheerleading
  - 2026(3A/D1)
- Football
  - 2020(3A/D1)
- One-act play
  - 2016(3A)
- Boys tennis- Brantson Reese Cook
  - 2013(2A), 2014(2A), 2015(3A), 2016(3A)
- Girls' basketball
  - 1994(2A), 2008(2A)
- Girls' cross-country
  - 2003(2A)
- Girls' golf
  - 2011(2A)

==== State finalists ====
- One-act play
  - 2013(2A)
- Boys' basketball
  - 2005(2A), 2008(2A)
- Football
  - 2003(2A/D1)
- Girls Basketball
  - 2025(3A/D1)

== Academics ==
- UIL Academic Meet champions
  - 2008(2A)
  - 2011(2A)
- Social studies individual state champion 2015: Josh Buske (3A)
- Social studies individual state champion 2016: Josh Buske (3A)
- Accounting team state champions 2015 (3A)
- State champion in one-act play 2016 (3A)
- Current Issues and Events team state champions 2022 (3A)

== Notable alumni ==
- Colt McCoy (2005) - NFL quarterback, played college football at the University of Texas-Austin
- Ed Sprinkle (1940) – former NFL Edge Rusher, National Football League 1940s All-Decade Team
