= Ed Sprinkle =

American football player (1923–2014)

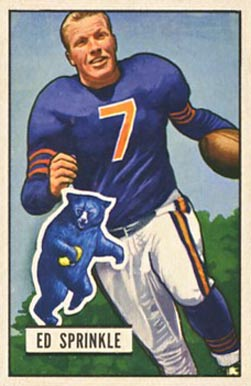
- Sprinkle on a 1951 Bowman football card

No. 7
- Positions: Defensive end, end

Personal information
- Born: September 3, 1923; Bradshaw, Texas, U.S.
- Died: July 28, 2014 (aged 90); Palos Heights, Illinois, U.S.
- Listed height: 6 ft 1 in (1.85 m)
- Listed weight: 206 lb (93 kg)

Career information
- High school: Tuscola (Tuscola, Texas)
- College: Hardin–Simmons (1940–1942); Navy (1943)
- NFL draft: 1944: undrafted

Career history
- Chicago Bears (1944–1955)

Awards and highlights
- NFL champion (1946); 3× Second-team All-Pro (1951, 1952, 1954); 4× Pro Bowl (1950–1952, 1954); NFL 1940s All-Decade Team; 100 greatest Bears of All-Time

Career NFL statistics
- Safeties: 1
- Interceptions: 4
- Interception yards: 55
- Fumble recoveries: 12
- Defensive touchdowns: 3
- Receptions: 32
- Receiving yards: 451
- Receiving touchdowns: 7
- Stats at Pro Football Reference
- Pro Football Hall of Fame

Edward Alexander Sprinkle (September 3, 1923 – July 28, 2014) was an American professional football defensive end and end who played for the Chicago Bears of the National Football League (NFL). He was known to many as "the Meanest Man in Pro Football" and was nicknamed "the Claw". He played for 12 seasons with the Bears and is credited with calling attention to the NFL's defensive players.

== College career ==
Prior to his NFL career, Sprinkle won three letters in football and two in basketball and earned All-Border Conference while at Hardin–Simmons University in the early 1940s. Hardin-Simmons dropped its sports program due to World War II, causing Sprinkle to transfer to the United States Naval Academy for his senior season in 1943, where he earned All-Eastern honors.

== Professional career ==
After leaving college, Sprinkle was signed by George Halas' Chicago Bears in 1944. At first, he played on both defense and offense; he caught 32 passes for 451 yards and seven touchdowns during his career. His ability to rush opposing quarterbacks, however, soon made him a defensive specialist.

Sprinkle quickly developed a reputation for his aggressive playing style; in the 1946 NFL Championship Game, New York Giants George Franck, Frank Reagan, and Frank Filchock left with injuries sustained in hits from Sprinkle. One of Sprinkle's tackling strategies, a clothesline tackle with his forearm, led to him receiving the nickname "The Claw" from Collier's Weekly.

While accused of "dirty play" and unsportsmanlike conduct during his career, leading to calls in 1949 from coaches Greasy Neale and Buddy Parker for the NFL to discipline him, he defended his play as not being any different from other players of the era. According to Sprinkle, "We were meaner in the 1950s because there were fewer positions and we fought harder for them. It was a different era." He was praised by Halas "the greatest pass-rusher I've ever seen," while Giants quarterback Y. A. Tittle remarked in 1969 that "quarterbacks would look with only one eye for receivers. They kept the other eye on Sprinkle."

== Post-playing career ==
Following his pro career, Sprinkle entered business in the Chicago area. He died on July 28, 2014.

The Professional Football Researchers Association named Sprinkle to the PFRA Hall of Very Good Class of 2007. Sprinkle was also inducted in the Chicagoland Sports Hall of Fame.

On January 15, 2020, Sprinkle was elected to the Pro Football Hall of Fame Class of 2020.

Sprinkle was also an avid golfer. He had a handicap of 18 at the Midlothian Country Club.

== External sources ==
- "Ed Sprinkle" (PDF). Coffin Corner. 12 (1). Professional Football Researchers Association: 1–3. 1990. Archived from the original (PDF) on October 7, 2010.
