= First Presbyterian Church (Abilene, Texas) =

Historic church in Texas, United States

- First Central Presbyterian Church
- U.S. National Register of Historic Places
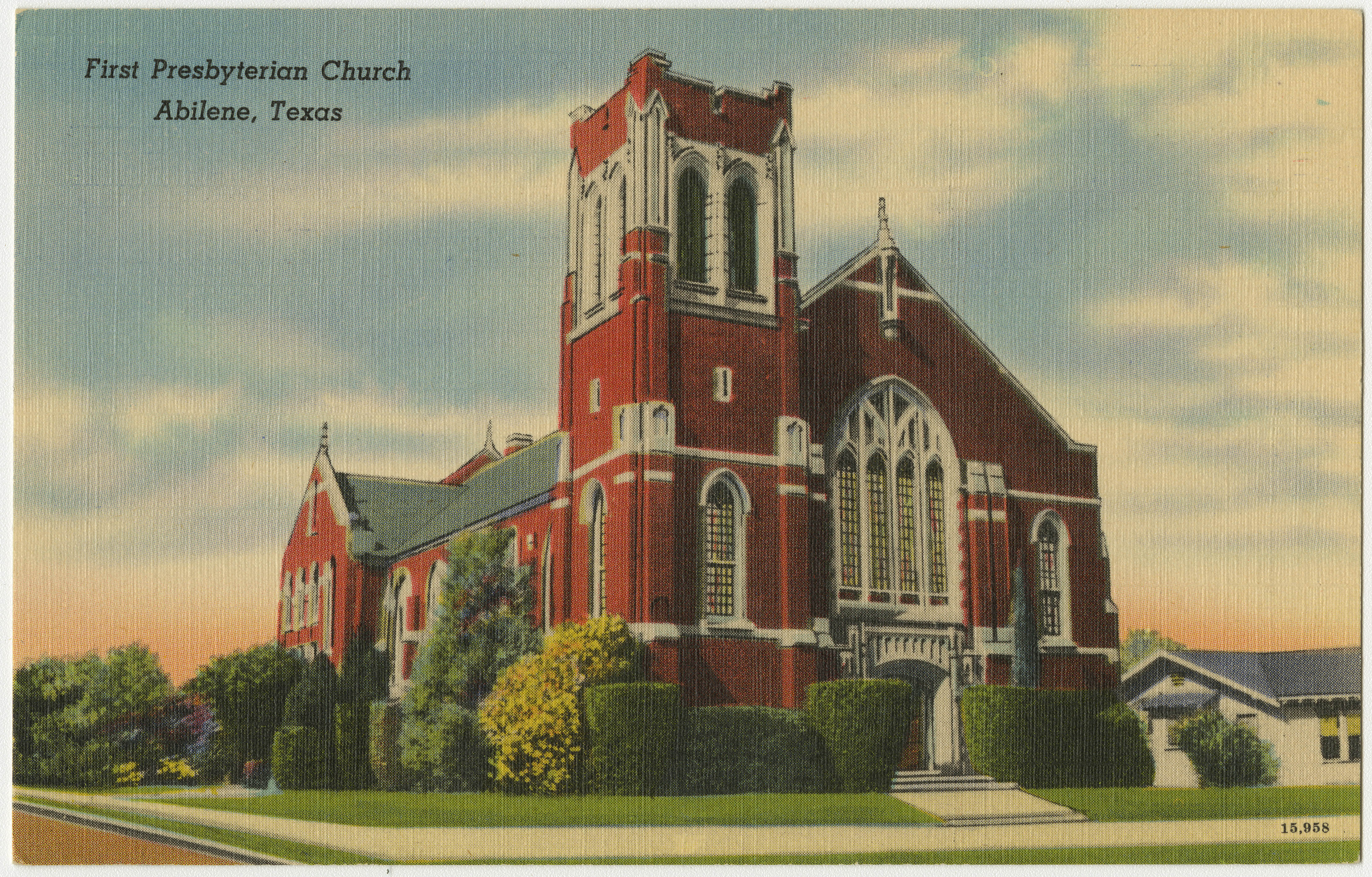

- Location within Texas Location within the United States
- Location: 400 Orange St., Abilene, Texas
- Coordinates: 32°27′12″N 99°44′15″W
- Area: less than one acre
- Built: 1924
- Architectural style: Late Gothic Revival
- MPS: Abilene MPS
- NRHP reference No.: 92000226
- Added to NRHP: March 23, 1992

First Presbyterian Church is a historic church at 400 Orange Street in Abilene, Texas.

The Gothic Revival style building was constructed in 1924 and added to the National Register of Historic Places in 1992.

== See also ==
- National Register of Historic Places listings in Taylor County, Texas
