= Colt McCoy =

American football player (born 1986)

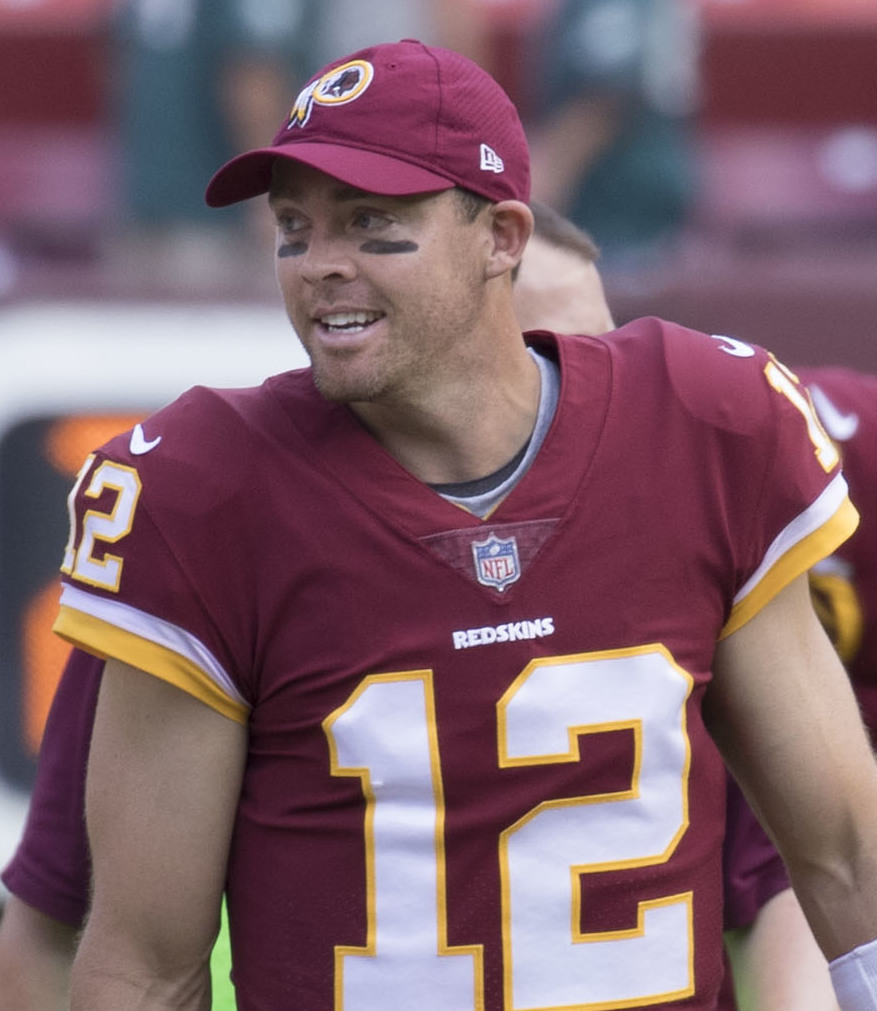
- McCoy with the Washington Redskins in 2017

No. 12, 2, 16
- Position: Quarterback

Personal information
- Born: September 5, 1986 (age 40); Hobbs, New Mexico, U.S.
- Listed height: 6 ft 1 in (1.85 m)
- Listed weight: 212 lb (96 kg)

Career information
- High school: Jim Ned (Tuscola, Texas)
- College: Texas (2005–2009)
- NFL draft: 2010: 3rd round, 85th overall pick

Career history
- Cleveland Browns (2010–2012); San Francisco 49ers (2013); Washington Redskins (2014–2019); New York Giants (2020); Arizona Cardinals (2021–2022)

Awards and highlights
- BCS National Champion (2005); Maxwell Award (2009); Davey O'Brien Award (2009); Manning Award (2009); Chic Harley Award (2009); Johnny Unitas Golden Arm Award (2009); Quarterback of the Year (2009); 2× Walter Camp Award (2008, 2009); Archie Griffin Award (2008); SN College Athlete of the Year (2009); Unanimous All-American (2009); Consensus All-American (2008); 2× NCAA completion percentage leader (2008, 2009); Big 12 Offensive Player of the Year (2009); Big 12 Offensive Freshman of the Year (2006); First-team All-Big 12 (2009); 2× Second-team All-Big 12 (2006, 2008); Texas Longhorns No. 12 retired

Career NFL statistics
- Passing attempts: 1,220
- Passing completions: 764
- Completion percentage: 62.6%
- TD–INT: 34–32
- Passing yards: 7,975
- Passer rating: 79.9
- Stats at Pro Football Reference

Daniel Colt McCoy (born September 5, 1986) is an American former professional football player who was a quarterback for 13 seasons in the National Football League (NFL). He played college football for the Texas Longhorns, winning several awards and honors as a senior in 2009 and ranking second all-time in games won by an FBS quarterback. McCoy was selected by the Cleveland Browns in the third round of the 2010 NFL draft and was also a member of the San Francisco 49ers, Washington Redskins, New York Giants, and Arizona Cardinals, primarily being used as a backup.

== Early life ==
McCoy was born on September 5, 1986, in Hobbs, New Mexico. He is the eldest of three children born to Steven Brad McCoy and Debra Kay (Woodruff) McCoy. McCoy attended Jim Ned High School in Tuscola, Texas, where he was coached in football by his father. McCoy achieved several distinctions as a high school player, including two-time Associated Press 2A Offensive MVP and First-team All-state selection. Over his career, McCoy completed 536-of-849 passes (63.1%) for 9,344 yards and 116 touchdowns. He ranks as the all-time leading passer in Texas Division 2A high school history and is fourth overall in Texas high school history. McCoy was also Jim Ned High School's punter as a junior and senior, and played free safety during his sophomore year. However, after suffering a concussion while tackling an opponent's 215-pound running back, McCoy's father decided not to let him play defense anymore. At the time, Jim Ned was 8–0, but when McCoy missed the next two games due to the concussion, Jim Ned's season unraveled. McCoy played in the 2003 Texas 2A State Championship against the San Augustine Wolves; Jim Ned lost 28–7.

== College career ==
McCoy attended the University of Texas at Austin, where he played for coach Mack Brown's Texas Longhorns football team from 2005 to 2009. McCoy was a four-year starter for the Longhorns from 2006 to 2009. He won or shared the team's MVP all four years, the only player in school history to do so.

=== 2005 season ===
As a freshman, McCoy was given a redshirt year, so he did not play during the team's 2005 national championship season. McCoy served as the quarterback for the scout team in practice against the starting defense. During this time, Matt McCoy (no relation) was officially listed as the number three quarterback behind Vince Young and Matt Nordgren. When Brown chose to play Matt McCoy in four separate game situations where Texas had a commanding lead, confusion arose as to which McCoy was in the game. Many sportscasters mistakenly referred to Matt McCoy as Colt McCoy, as Colt was the more widely known player. The following year, with Young forgoing his senior year to enter the NFL and Nordgren graduating, the position of starting quarterback for the defending National Champion Texas Longhorns came down to a competition between redshirt freshman Colt McCoy and true freshman Jevan Snead.

=== 2006 season ===
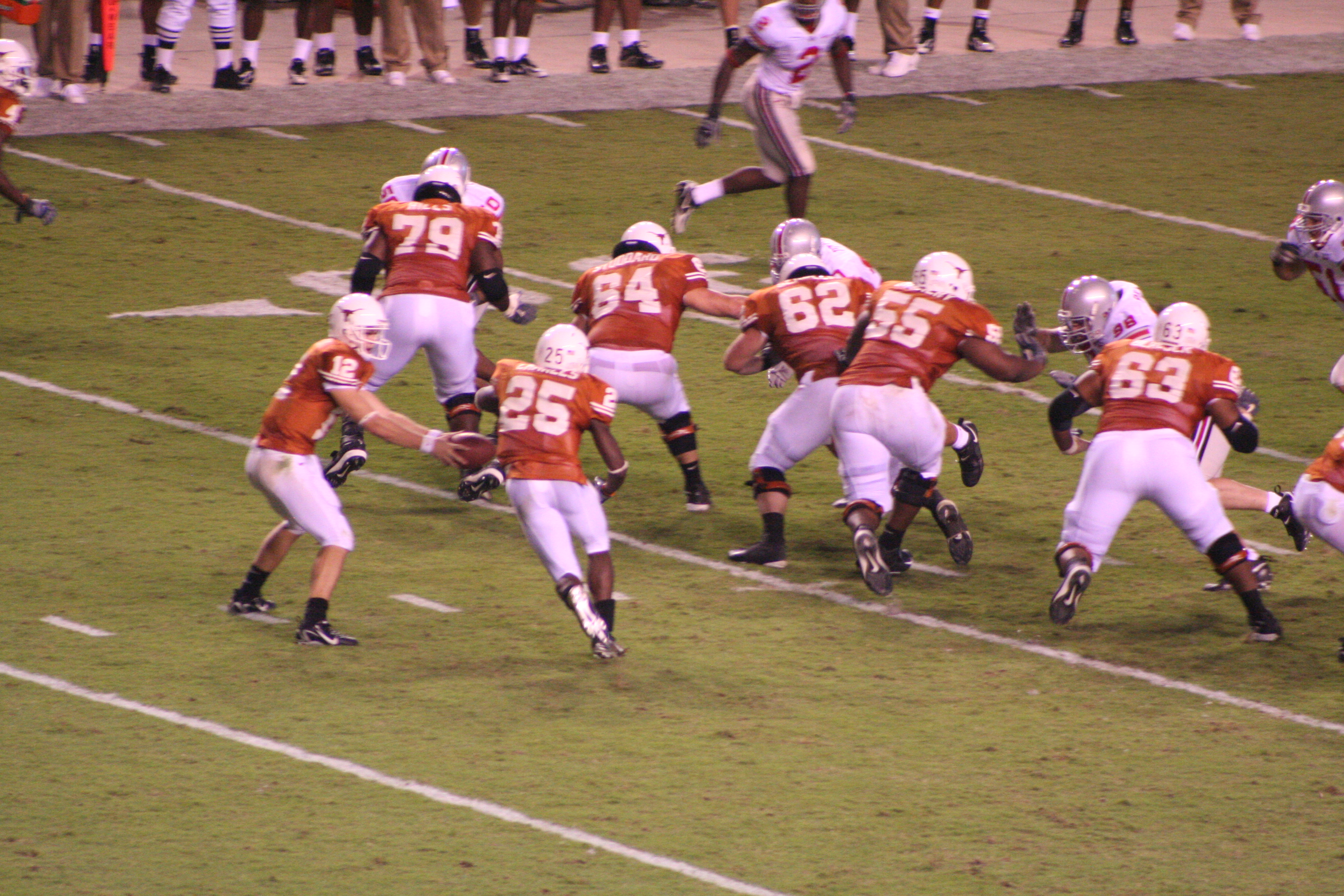
McCoy hands off to Jamaal Charles vs. Ohio State.

McCoy was named the starting quarterback after winning out a competition with Jevan Snead. The season opener saw McCoy lead the Longhorns to a 56–7 victory over North Texas, throwing for three touchdowns and rushing a yard for another, while throwing no interceptions. He was 12–19 in passing, and ran for 27 yards to help set up a touchdown. In only his second pass as a college quarterback, McCoy threw a 60-yard touchdown. He was the first Texas freshman quarterback to start and win a season-opening game since Bobby Layne in 1944. The following week, the Longhorns faced #1 Ohio State at home. McCoy went 19–32, 156 yards, a touchdown, and an interception while rushing four times for a total of eight yards. Ohio State defeated the Longhorns 24–7, ending the Longhorns 21-game winning streak.

Following victories over Rice, Iowa State, and Sam Houston State, McCoy got his first win over a ranked team, as well as his first come-from-behind victory, after leading the Longhorns over rival Oklahoma 28–10 in the Red River Shootout. McCoy threw for two touchdowns in the game. The two touchdowns by McCoy gave him 12 touchdown passes for the season, tied for third with Longhorn passer James Brown in the list of most touchdowns by a Texas freshman.

On October 14, 2006, McCoy threw a Texas record six touchdown passes in the win against Baylor. The previous record of five touchdown passes had been held by James Brown (set vs. Baylor in 1994) and Chris Simms (vs. Oklahoma State in 2001). On October 25, McCoy was ninth in the nation with a quarterback rating of 165.4.

In the 2006 Oklahoma State game, McCoy threw for his 27th passing touchdown of the season, giving him sole possession of the single-season Texas record and putting him two touchdowns shy of the NCAA single season record for freshman quarterbacks (29). Coincidentally, this 27th pass was also for 27 yards.

During the November 11, 2006, game against Kansas State, McCoy suffered a stinger shoulder injury while rushing for a touchdown on the opening drive against Kansas State. Snead came in and played the remainder of the game. The Longhorns fell behind by as much as 21 points before Snead brought them back to within three points, finally falling in an upset by the Wildcats 45–42. There was speculation that Snead might be the starter for the final regular season game, because it was unknown whether McCoy would return for the Longhorns season closer against rival Texas A&M on November 24, 2006. However, McCoy was cleared to play the game against the Aggies.

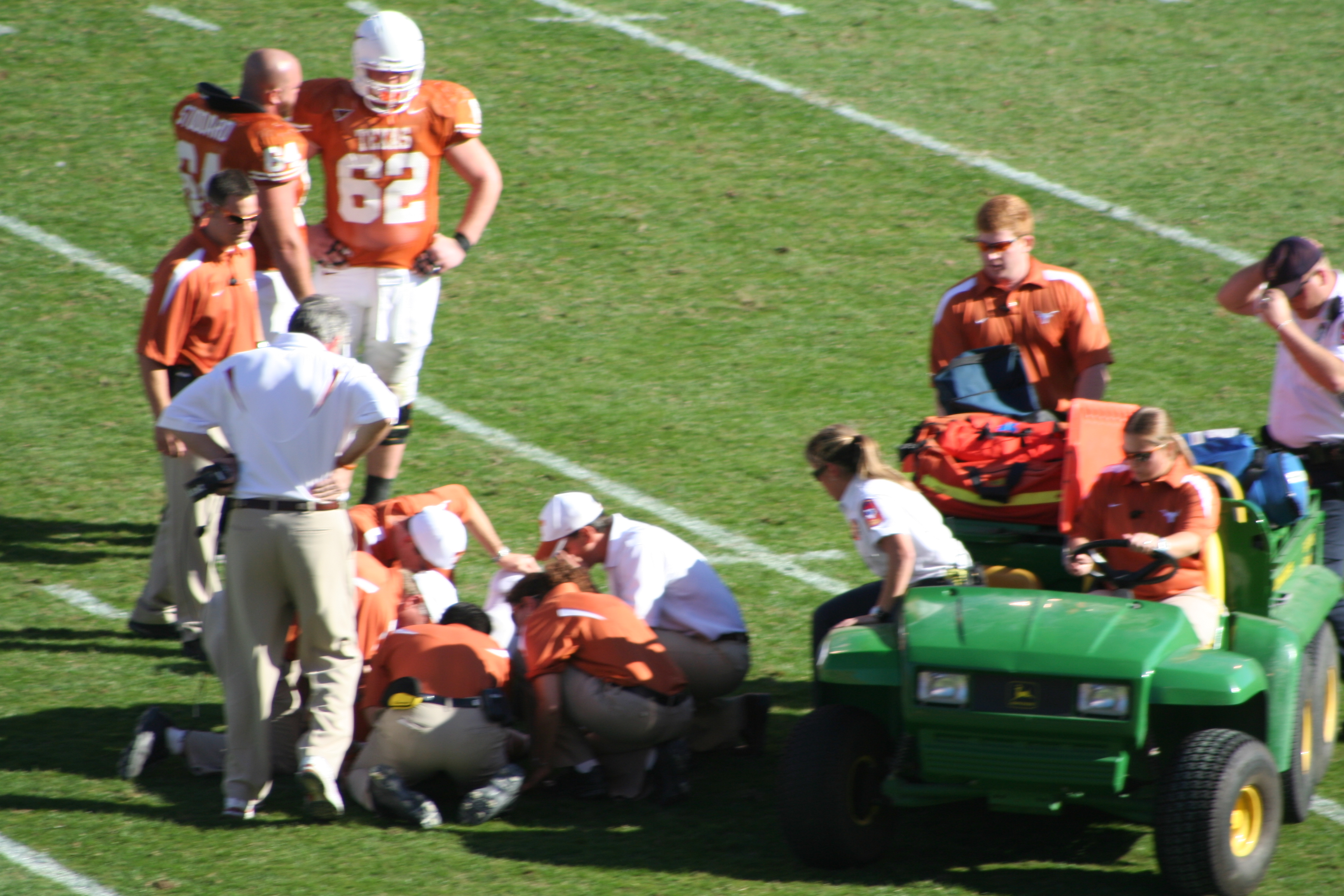
McCoy prior to being taken off the field near the end of the Texas A&M game

With 20 seconds remaining in the Lone Star Showdown versus the Aggies, McCoy was injured by a "vicious, stadium-hushing tackle" as Aggie defensive end Michael Bennett connected with his helmet against McCoy's upper body after McCoy had thrown an incomplete pass. Replays showed both on television and in the stadium revealed the hit might have included "helmet-to-helmet" contact which is illegal in NCAA football only if done intentionally, but no flag was thrown. When the replay was shown in the stadium, the Longhorn fans erupted in boos before lapsing back into silence as McCoy lay on the ground writhing for ten minutes before being taken off the field on a cart. Mack Brown said after the game "I didn't see it, but it sounded like 88,000 (fans) thought it was dirty". Fellow Longhorn Selvin Young said he thought the hit was a clean "textbook" hit. McCoy was taken to University Medical Center Brackenridge where he spent more than three hours undergoing an evaluation that included an X-ray, MRI, and a CAT scan. Longhorns trainer Kenny Boyd said the injury was a severe pinched nerve in McCoy's neck. Boyd said that McCoy was expected to make a full recovery, but no timetable was set for McCoy to return to play. The injury to McCoy came one game-clock minute after an A&M player, #91 Kellen Heard had been ejected from the game for vicious blindside block on McCoy after he threw an interception, which was ruled excessive. An X-ray, MRI exam and CT scan showed "no structural damage to McCoy's neck or shoulder".

On December 1, 2006, the Longhorns issued a statement confirming that back-up quarterback Jevan Snead had left the team and would transfer to an unspecified school. This meant there would be no scholarship quarterback available to play in the Longhorns' bowl game if McCoy was not ready. On December 21, Texas announced that McCoy was cleared to start in the Alamo Bowl. In the 2006 Alamo Bowl played on December 30, McCoy threw two touchdowns against Iowa to tie the NCAA freshman record of 29 touchdown passes established by Nevada's David Neill in 1998. This record has since been broken by Oklahoma's Sam Bradford in the 2007 season. Also during the 2006 season, McCoy was named College Football News Big 12 Player of the Year and was named the quarterback to their "All Freshman Team".

=== 2007 season ===
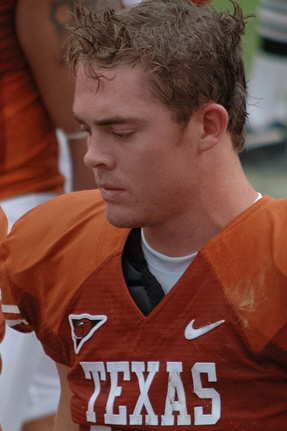
McCoy on the sidelines during the home loss to Kansas State

After just one season with Texas, McCoy received a lot of media attention, including appearing on some lists of the nation's top players of 2007. In June 2007, McCoy appeared on the cover of Dave Campbell's Texas Football alongside Texas A&M quarterback Stephen McGee and TCU defensive end Tommy Blake. Additionally, Rivals.com named McCoy one of the top 10 quarterbacks going into the 2007 season. He also made the Athlon Sports first-team All Big 12.

On June 26, 2007, Maxwell Football Club president Ron Jaworski announced that McCoy had been named to the preseason watch list for the Maxwell Award. The initial list includes 64 players. The winner turned out to be Tim Tebow. In their 2007 season preview magazine, CBS Sportsline.com listed McCoy as one of twelve players on the "Heisman Watch"; saying "We were touting him for the Heisman midway through his freshman season until he was injured against Kansas State. Older and stronger, McCoy has an awesome receiving corps to make a run at the hardware for real." He is also one of the 35 quarterbacks placed on the 2007 Manning Award watch list. Further, the Davey O'Brien National Quarterback Award Watch List added McCoy on August 21.

McCoy led the Longhorns, who were ranked number four in the pre-season Associated Press Poll and Coaches Poll, to a 21–13 victory over unranked Arkansas State in the season opener. McCoy threw two touchdown passes and two interceptions. He also made two quick-kick punts when the Longhorns lined up as if they were attempting to convert on fourth down. He averaged thirty yards per kick and both kicks were downed inside the opponent's twenty yard-line. In the second game, McCoy led the Longhorns to a 34–13 victory over #19-ranked TCU.

In the road opener, McCoy's 47 passing attempts tied a Texas single-game record. His 32 completions set a new school record, besting the 30 completed by Vince Young during the 2006 Rose Bowl and by Major Applewhite during two 1999 games. The final non-conference game was against Rice, and McCoy completed 20 of his 29 passing attempts, accumulating 333 yards through the air. For the first time in the season, he did not throw an interception. McCoy and most of the Longhorn starting players were replaced by backups after the first drive of the second half. True freshman quarterback John Chiles made his first college appearance in the first quarter. He came onto the field beside McCoy and then McCoy trotted out to a slot receiver position. Chiles never looked to pass; he ran up the middle for no gain. He came out of the game after that play and came back in the third quarter as McCoy's replacement. On that drive, Chiles line up in the zone-read offense and led the Longhorns 80 yards to a touchdown, carrying the ball four times for 49 yards. Chiles' strong performance immediately led to media speculation as to how much playing time he will take from McCoy.

McCoy played the worst game of his career in an upset loss to the Kansas State Wildcats. He threw for 200 yards and had four interceptions. McCoy also suffered a concussion during the game and left the field just prior to the end of the first half and again prior to the end of the game. After that game, Sports Illustrated selected him as one of the season's 10 "Most Disappointing College Players" and noted that McCoy's nine interceptions thrown so far in 2007 were already two more than he threw in the entire 2006 season. Stewart Mandel of Sports Illustrated listed several factors contributing to the Longhorns' struggles. He cited the off-field problems as evidence that no Texas player has been able to show the superior leadership skills of Vince Young. Mandel said that McCoy, still only a sophomore, had not been able to completely fill that gap and that McCoy's play had not been as good as during 2006. He also said part of the blame is to be placed on an offensive line that lost several starters and has not been able to consistently protect McCoy. Finally, Mandel noted that the running game had been "equally inconsistent." It was the worst home-field loss in Mack Brown's time with Texas. For the Wildcats, the win over Texas was the first road victory over a top–ten team in school history.

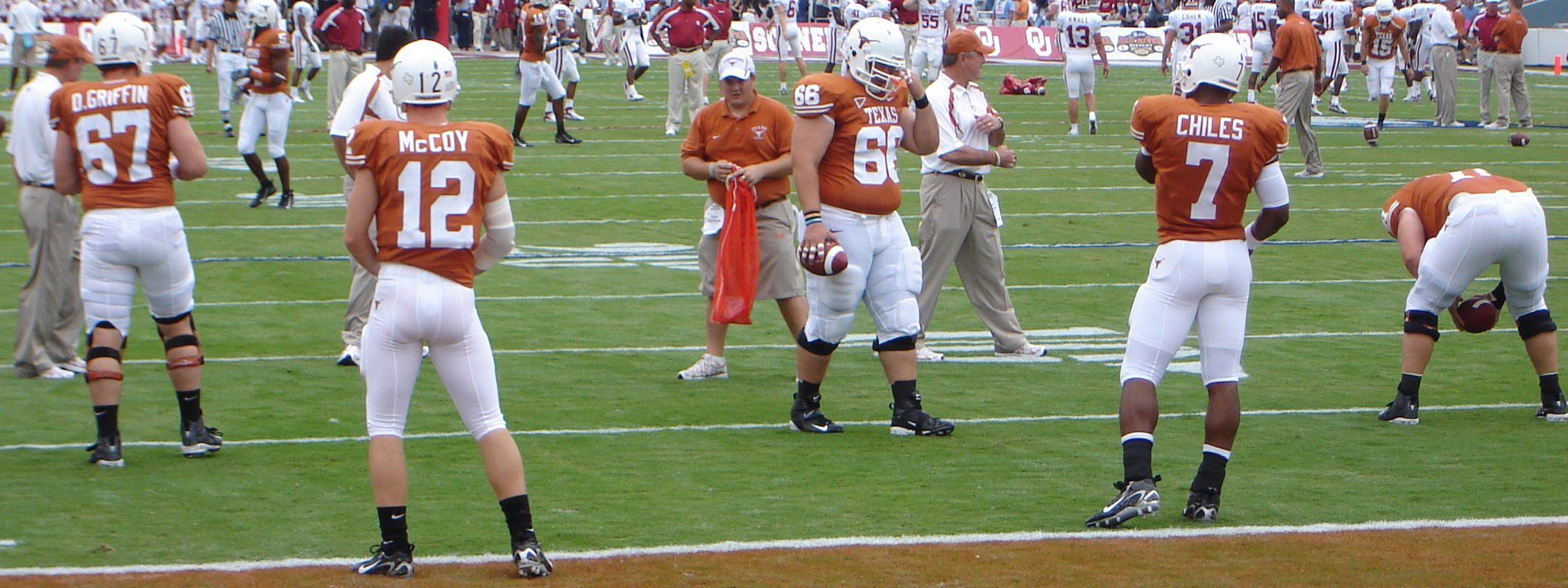
McCoy and back-up quarterback John Chiles at the Red River Shootout

McCoy and the Longhorns lost again the following week in the 2007 Red River Shootout. The game was a back-and-forth affair that was ultimately won by Oklahoma 28–21. OU's freshman quarterback, Sam Bradford, was 21–of–32 for 244 yards and three touchdowns. McCoy was 19–of–26 for 324 yards and two touchdowns. McCoy threw one interception. McCoy played the game with his throwing arm bandaged from mid-forearm to biceps. He held up physically despite taking four sacks and a blind-side late hit after one play had been whistled dead. With the loss, Texas opened conference play 0–2 for the first time since 1956, when they were in the Southwest Conference and one year before Darrell Royal became head coach of the Longhorns.

The Longhorns were in control of the Iowa State game almost from the very beginning and they routed the Cyclones 56–3, the worst loss for the Cyclones since 1997. Lined up in the spread offense on the first play from scrimmage, Colt McCoy scrambled away from a blitz and threw a pass to Jordan Shipley for a 58-yard touchdown. The offensive line provided great protection for Colt McCoy, who called most of the plays without huddling and directed the Longhorns to touchdowns on his first five series. He completed 23 of 30 passes for 298 yards, 4 touchdowns, and no interceptions. His most athletic play came early in the third quarter when he evaded three defenders on a play from the Cyclones' 20-yard line. He twisted around and managed to stay upright long enough to throw a pass to Nate Jones in the end zone. He capped off his performance by making his first rushing touchdown of the season. However, against Baylor on October 20, Colt threw 2 interceptions and 1 touchdown, and against Nebraska the following week, McCoy completed less than 50% of his passes and threw another interception. On the day after Thanksgiving, McCoy was 17 of 32 with 1 interception, while be sacked 4 times in the 38–30 loss to Texas A&M. At the conclusion of the 2007 regular season, Mccoy had thrown for 21 touchdowns and 18 interceptions.

In the 2007 Holiday Bowl, against Arizona State, McCoy led the Longhorns to a 52–34 victory and won the offensive MVP award.

=== 2008 season ===
On January 2, 2008, Texas running back Jamaal Charles decided to forgo his senior season with Texas in favor of the 2008 NFL draft. With Charles' departure, McCoy became the leading returning rusher for the 2008 Longhorns.

McCoy rose in the record books during the first four games of the season. On August 30, 2008, he threw for 222 yards and rushed for 103 yards against FAU, becoming the second player in school history to pass for 200 and rush for 100 yards in more than one game; the other being Vince Young. Three weeks later, McCoy surpassed the Texas All-Time record for the most passing TD's with 62 while beating Rice 52–10. The record was previously held by Major Applewhite. Through the first four games of 2008, McCoy completed 80% of his passes and had a quarterback rating of 209.71. Leading the 2008 Texas Longhorns football team, McCoy and the Longhorns began the season with eight straight wins, including a win over then #1 Oklahoma, #6 Oklahoma State and #11 Missouri. His performance helped the Longhorns rise at one point to the #1 ranking in the national polls, although the Longhorns lost to Texas Tech and finished ranked third in the BCS standings. In 2008, McCoy set school records for most career touchdown passes, most touchdown passes in a season, most total touchdowns by a Texas player, most career wins, and most career passing yards. In addition to setting passing records, McCoy led the team with 561 yards rushing and eleven rushing touchdowns, establishing a reputation as a dual threat quarterback.

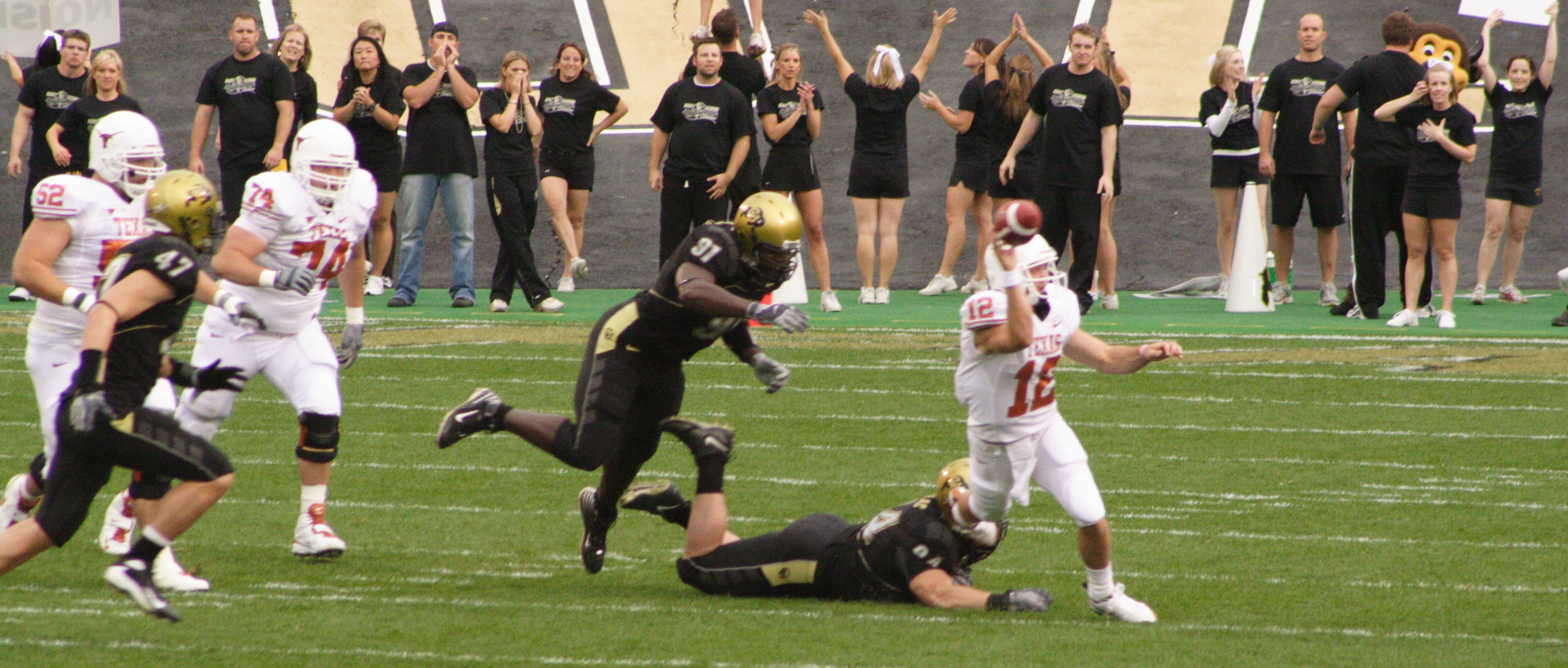
McCoy preparing to throw a 65-yard touchdown pass to Chris Ogbonnaya in the win over Colorado

The Longhorns opened conference play against the Colorado Buffaloes and won 38–14. McCoy threw for two touchdowns and moved past Ricky Williams into second on Texas' all-time list for touchdowns responsible for (passing, rushing, receiving). McCoy at that point had 77, while Williams had 76 with the Horns. Texas continued conference play by defeating #1 ranked Oklahoma Sooners in the 2008 Texas vs. Oklahoma football game. McCoy was 28 for 35 for 277 yards and one touchdown, bringing Texas to the position of the #1 in the AP poll for the first time since 1984.

On October 18 against Missouri, McCoy completed the game with 337 yards on 29-of-32 passing with two touchdowns, rushed for two more and at one point completed a school-record 17 passes in a row. His completion ratio of 79% coming into the game improved as he completed 91% of his passes in this game. His four touchdowns put him in first place for the most career touchdowns scored at Texas (82), passing Vince Young (81).

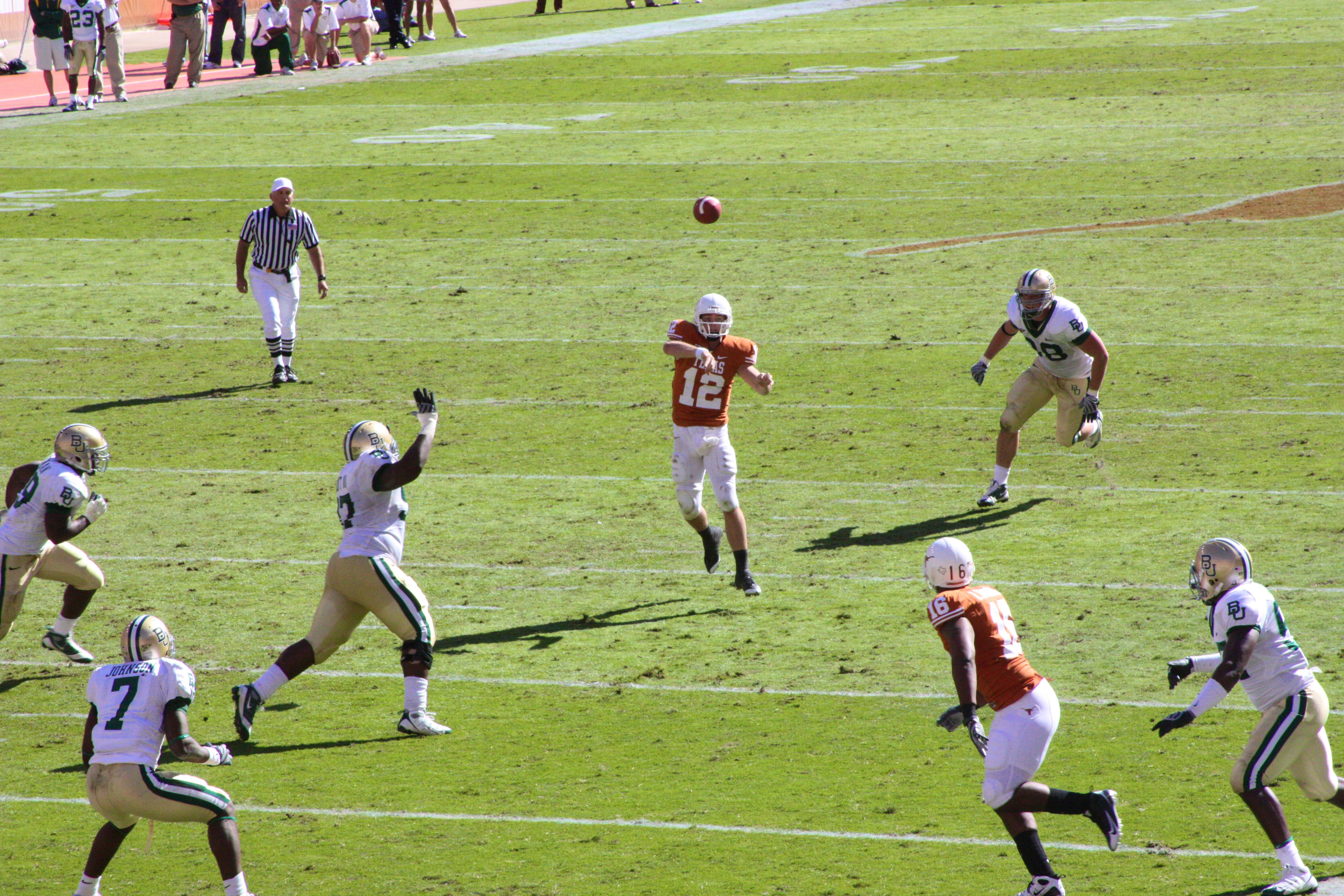
McCoy throwing a pass against Baylor.

UT lost to Texas Tech with one second remaining in the game. Texas fell to #4 in the BCS rankings. They climbed to #3 the following week as the Horns beat Baylor and former #3 Penn State lost. The win over Baylor was the 829th win for the Texas football program, which tied Notre Dame for 2nd in the list of college football's ten most victorious programs.

McCoy led the Longhorns to a 35–7 road victory over the Kansas, ensuring their eighth consecutive season with ten or more wins per season. That is the longest active streak in the nation and it ties them with Miami (1985–92) for the second-longest streak of all time. It was Colt McCoy's 30th career win, which tied him with Vince Young for the school record. McCoy completed 24 of 35 passing attempts (71%) for 255 yards and two touchdowns. He was also the leading rusher for both schools, rushing for 78 yards and a touchdown. McCoy's two touchdown passes put him at 31 for the season, breaking his own school record.

McCoy had another strong performance against in-state rival Texas A&M in the final game of the regular season. McCoy and the Longhorns nearly equaled that record this year by producing a 49–9 victory, the second-largest margin of victory for this rivalry series.

The win was the 31st in McCoy's collegiate career, setting a new school record. McCoy rushed for two touchdowns and threw for two more. He completed 23 of 28 attempted passes (82%) for a total of 311 yards. That yardage put McCoy at 3,594 yards for the season—another school record. He finished the 2008 regular season with a 76.7% completion percentage, breaking the mark set by Daunte Culpepper for Central Florida, and was the Longhorns' leading rusher with 576 yards and 11 rushing touchdowns.

On January 5, 2009, McCoy led the Longhorns to a 24–21 victory over Ohio State in the Fiesta Bowl. He completed 41-of-59 passes for 414 yards, two touchdowns, and an interception. McCoy was named the Offensive Player of the Game for his performance. He was named the 2008 AP Big 12 Offensive Player of the Year.

=== 2009 season ===
In his final season, McCoy led the Texas Longhorns to a perfect 12–0 regular season record, as well as a 13–12 victory over the Nebraska Cornhuskers to win the Big 12 Championship in Cowboys Stadium. While becoming the most victorious quarterback in NCAA history with 45 career wins, McCoy was again the focal point of the Longhorn offense that scored 550 points in 2009, ranked third in UT All-Time season scoring (behind only the 2005 and 2008 teams). McCoy led a fast-paced offense, with accurate, short passes in his repertoire. The Texas offense executed a total of 1,053 plays in 14 games played in 2009. His favorite target was wide receiver Jordan Shipley (#8), who went on to play in the NFL with the Cincinnati Bengals. He finished third in Heisman Trophy voting in 2009.

McCoy left the 2010 BCS National Championship Game against Alabama during Texas' first offensive drive early in the first quarter with a right shoulder injury and was sidelined for the remainder of the game. McCoy was replaced by true freshman quarterback Garrett Gilbert. Alabama won the game 37–21. His record as a starter was 45–8.

=== Candidate for Heisman and other national awards ===
McCoy was mentioned as a Heisman Trophy candidate in his sophomore year (2006), and he appeared on the Athlon Sports pre-season Heisman watch at the start of the 2007 season.

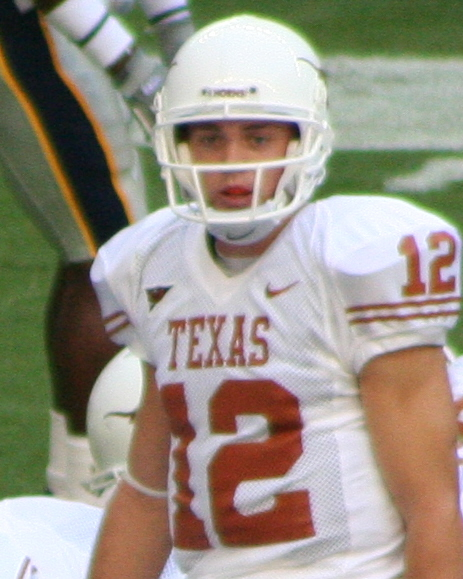
McCoy in 2006

The talk became more widespread during his junior year, as McCoy was mentioned by several analysts and voters as a potential 2008 Heisman winner. McCoy was the unanimous front-runner in an October 20 poll of 10 Heisman voters conducted by the Rocky Mountain News. Tim Tebow, quarterback of the Florida Gators, had a vote as the 2007 winner. Seven games into the season he said that McCoy would have his vote at that point in the season.

In the 45–21 victory over Baylor, McCoy passed for 300 yards and five touchdowns. The Associated Press story commented, "McCoy likely refueled his Heisman Trophy bid by completing 26 of 37 passes for his fourth 300-yard game this season, and eighth of his career, even without playing the final 12 minutes. The touchdowns went to four different receivers, though he did have two interceptions."

On November 11 (with UT holding an 8–1 record) Heisman voter Rodney Gilmore of ESPN.com had McCoy listed third of five Heisman candidates. Gilmore said, "I love his numbers (78 percent completion percentage, 28 touchdowns, only 7 interceptions and 2,879 yards) and his gutsy second-half performance against Texas Tech. And I have not forgotten about his epic performance against Oklahoma just a few weeks ago. However, Harrell outplayed McCoy head-to-head in the showdown last week, so Harrell has a leg up on him for now, but McCoy is within striking distance." That same day, the Rocky Mountain News poll listed Harrell first and McCoy second in their weekly poll of 10 Heisman voters. Harrell received 44 points and 7 first-place votes while McCoy had 34 points and 2 first-place votes.

On November 25, 2008, McCoy was named one of three finalists for the Maxwell Award, which is presented to the top all-around player in the country. The other finalists were Florida quarterback Tim Tebow, the prior year's winner, and Texas Tech quarterback Graham Harrell. Oklahoma's Sam Bradford was not selected as a finalist. McCoy also was named a finalist for the Davey O'Brien Award, which goes to the country's top quarterback. Bradford and Harrell were the other two candidates; Tebow did not make the list for this award.

After McCoy led the Longhorns to a victory over rival, unranked Texas A&M (a team he had lost to twice in the past), Sports Illustrated analyst Stewart Mandel said the quarterback took a big step towards claiming the Heisman Trophy. Mandel wrote, "From the Longhorns' opening touchdown drive, in which he accounted for 67 of Texas' 80 yards, McCoy was very much the one-man wrecking crew he's been all season long...His final numbers in just over three quarters of work Thursday night: 23-of-28 passing for 311 yards and two touchdowns and 11 rushes for 49 yards, with touchdown runs of 16 and 14 yards. For the season, McCoy now has a 77.6 completion percentage (soon to be a new NCAA record) for 3,445 yards, 32 touchdowns and seven interceptions, plus 476 yards and 13 touchdowns running" Comparing McCoy to fellow Big 12 South quarterbacks Sam Bradford and Graham Harrell, Mandel said, "But here's where McCoy stands out to me. Bradford, as talented as he is, is helped by the fact he has a trio of explosive receivers and two potential 1,000-yard rushers behind him. Harrell has Michael Crabtree. Daniel has Jeremy Maclin. With all due respect to Jordan Shipley and Quan Cosby, McCoy is Texas' offense. Much like Tim Tebow last season, he's both his team's leading passer and rusher. Also like Tebow—you have to wonder sometimes how he's still standing. McCoy was sacked three times Thursday night and endured several brutal hits. Following his third-quarter touchdown run, trainers attended to his shoulder on the sideline. But he was right back in there the next series." Bradford and Harrell each had one regular-season game left, against Oklahoma State and Baylor, respectively. Tebow had games remaining against Florida State and Alabama.

In the final 2008 Rocky Mountain News poll before the Heisman votes were announced, McCoy moved to the top of the list, but had a very thin lead over Sam Bradford and Tim Tebow, who were in second and third place, respectively. The poll had correctly predicted the Heisman winner in 18 of the previous 21 years. On December 10, McCoy, Bradford, and Tebow were selected as the three finalists for the Heisman Trophy. Bradford won the trophy with 1,726 total points, and McCoy finished second with 1,604 points in the Heisman voting.

In 2009, McCoy was again in strong consideration for the Heisman, even with the two previous Heisman winners coming back for their senior seasons. At the start of the season he and Tebow were considered the favorites. But McCoy's numbers were down a little from 2008, and despite leading his team to the BCS Championship game, McCoy's chances of winning disappeared during a close 13–12 Big 12 Title game where he threw three interceptions, no touchdowns and nearly threw the game away at the end. Despite this, McCoy still had an outstanding season and was again named a finalist, this time along with Tim Tebow, Mark Ingram, Jr, Toby Gerhart and Ndamukong Suh. He became only the second Longhorn, along with Ricky Williams, to be a two-time Heisman finalist. McCoy finished third behind Ingram and Gerhart.

In 2024, McCoy was inducted into the University of Texas Sports Hall of Fame.

== Professional career ==
=== Pre-draft ===
In October 2008, McCoy said he would stay at Texas for his senior year instead of leaving for the 2009 NFL draft. McCoy was quoted as saying, "I'm going to play here for four years. I've been blessed to be able to play here. Not very many people get to [start] here for four years, so what an opportunity. And if the NFL is there for me, then I hope that I'll get to keep playing, because I love to play this game. Hopefully, it will work out."

After a 49–9 victory over Texas A&M on November 27, 2008, McCoy said that he still intended to come back for his senior year, but that it would be "foolish" for him not to ask the NFL to evaluate his draft prospects. McCoy said that if he were rated a first- or second-round draft pick, he might change his mind about staying. McCoy said, "But at the same time, I want to play four years here. Not very many people have had the opportunity to do that. That's something that's real special to me and important to me."

On December 8, 2008, after the Longhorns learned they had been passed over for the national championship game, McCoy said he would return to the team for his senior year. McCoy indicated he wanted to play for a national championship. He also said, "I'm coming back because we have a solid coaching staff, and I'm coming back because I feel like I can develop the young receivers we have."

McCoy injured his throwing arm in the BCS title game against Alabama with a pinched nerve. He announced he would not attend the NFL Combine and instead performed during the University of Texas pro workout day. Opinions over McCoy's potential in the NFL were mixed. Frank Cooney of USA Today noted that McCoy "fired mostly from a shotgun, has a low release point and might lack an NFL fastball." He was listed by Cooney as the 3rd best QB draft choice in 2010, behind Sam Bradford and Jimmy Clausen.

Prior to the draft, McCoy said he had "no expectations."

Pre-draft measurables
Height	Weight	Arm length	Hand span	40-yard dash	10-yard split	20-yard split	Broad jump	Wonderlic
6 ft 1 1/8 in (1.86 m)	216 lb (98 kg)	31 in (0.79 m)	9 3/8 in (0.24 m)	4.79 s	1.66 s	2.76 s	9 ft 6 in (2.90 m)	25
All values from 2010 NFL Scouting Combine.

=== Cleveland Browns ===
==== 2010 ====
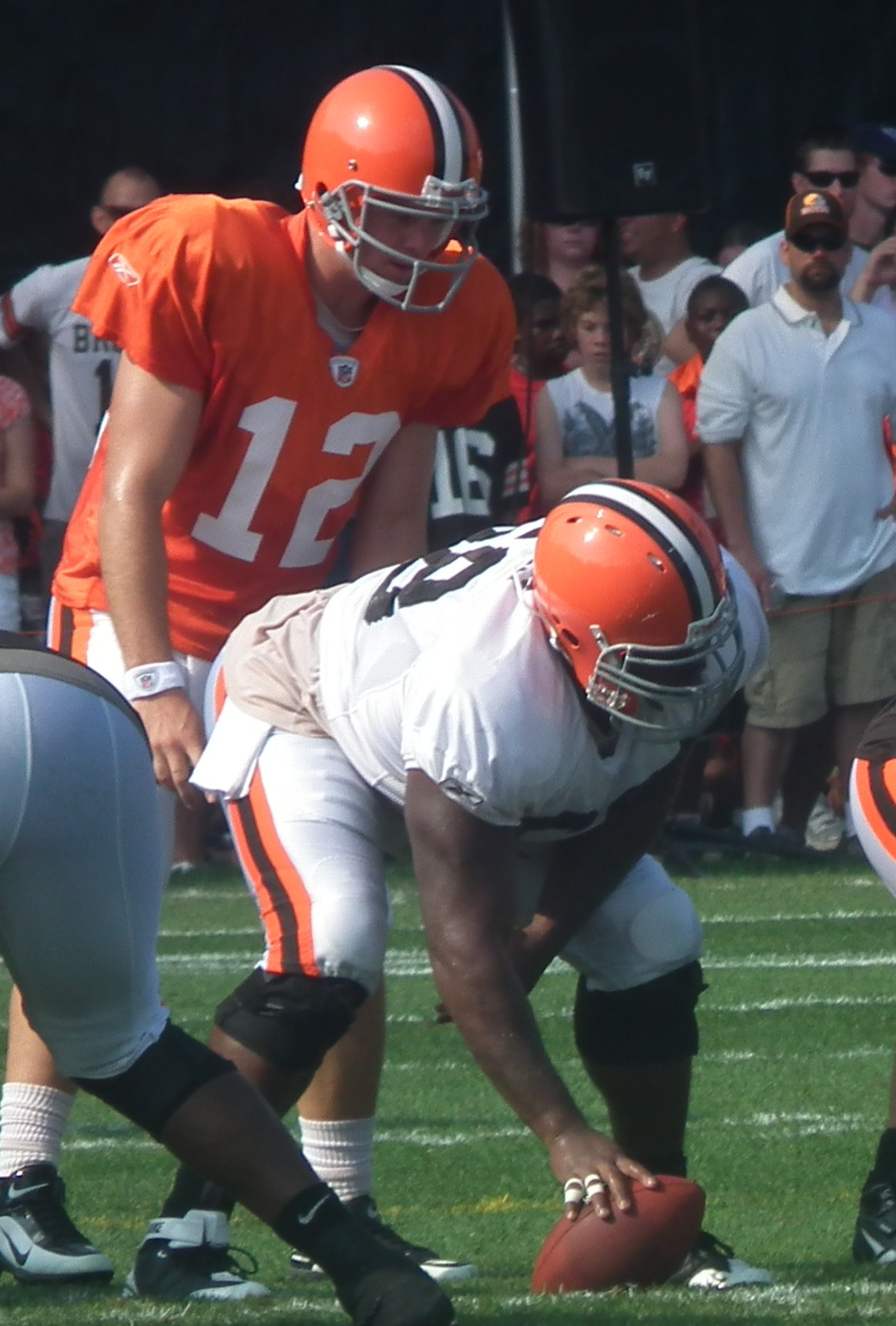
McCoy at training camp in 2010

McCoy was selected by the Cleveland Browns in the third round (85th overall) of the 2010 NFL draft. The Browns previously traded linebacker Kamerion Wimbley to the Oakland Raiders in order to acquire the pick used to select McCoy. One reporter commented that McCoy was drafted later than expected because "he lacks NFL size..., has small hands and was injured in the last game of his career at Texas." In response to being chosen by Cleveland, McCoy said, "I can't wait to be a Cleveland Brown and that we're going to win a lot of games. Cleveland has a little orange in their jerseys just like UT. It's a perfect fit." On July 23, McCoy agreed to terms on a four-year, $5 million contract.

Pointing out that Cleveland already had three quarterbacks, Browns president Mike Holmgren said McCoy would likely not play his first season with the team in order to develop him as an NFL quarterback. However, due to injuries to starting quarterback Jake Delhomme and back-up Seneca Wallace, McCoy made his first career start against the Pittsburgh Steelers in Week 6. McCoy completed 23 of 33 passes for 281 yards, a touchdown, and two interceptions in the Browns' loss. He also scrambled four times for 22 yards. McCoy started the following week against the New Orleans Saints and contributed to the surprising victory over the defending Super Bowl champions 30–17 at the Louisiana Superdome in New Orleans. On November 7, McCoy made his third consecutive start and led the Browns to another upset victory, this time against the New England Patriots 34–14. He started again on November 14 against the New York Jets; however the Browns lost in overtime with McCoy throwing for 205 yards and a touchdown. McCoy injured his ankle in Week 11 against the Jacksonville Jaguars and missed the next three weeks before returning to start under center against the Cincinnati Bengals in Week 15. McCoy threw for 243 yards and two touchdowns with no interceptions, but Cleveland lost. In each of the final two games against the division rival Baltimore Ravens and Pittsburgh Steelers, McCoy threw three interceptions as the Browns lost both games. McCoy finished his rookie season starting 8 games, with a 2–6 record, and with six touchdowns against nine interceptions.

==== 2011 ====
After a long-awaited pre-season after the agreements from the NFL lockout, and the release of Delhomme, McCoy became the starter for the Browns. During the home opener against the Cincinnati Bengals, McCoy completed 19 of 40 attempts for 213 yards, two touchdowns, and an interception in a 27–17 loss. The next two weeks, the Browns defeated the Indianapolis Colts and the Miami Dolphins with McCoy throwing combined 41 of 71 attempts, 421 yards, and three touchdowns with one interception. Against the Tennessee Titans in Week 4, McCoy threw a touchdown and an interception during the 31–13 loss. After a bye week, McCoy and the Browns lost to the Oakland Raiders 24–17; McCoy threw for 215 yards with two touchdowns and no interceptions. After the loss to the Raiders, the Browns played the Seattle Seahawks and won 6–3 as McCoy finished with 178 yards, no touchdowns, and an interception. Against the Pittsburgh Steelers in Week 14, McCoy threw two interceptions and no touchdowns in a 3–14 loss where McCoy would also sustain a concussion. His father raised eyebrows when he questioned whether or not McCoy's team had properly evaluated him for the concussion prior to returning to the game. McCoy stated that he did not remember anything. James Harrison, the Steelers player responsible for the helmet-to-helmet hit on McCoy, was suspended for the Steelers' next game against the San Francisco 49ers.

==== 2012 ====
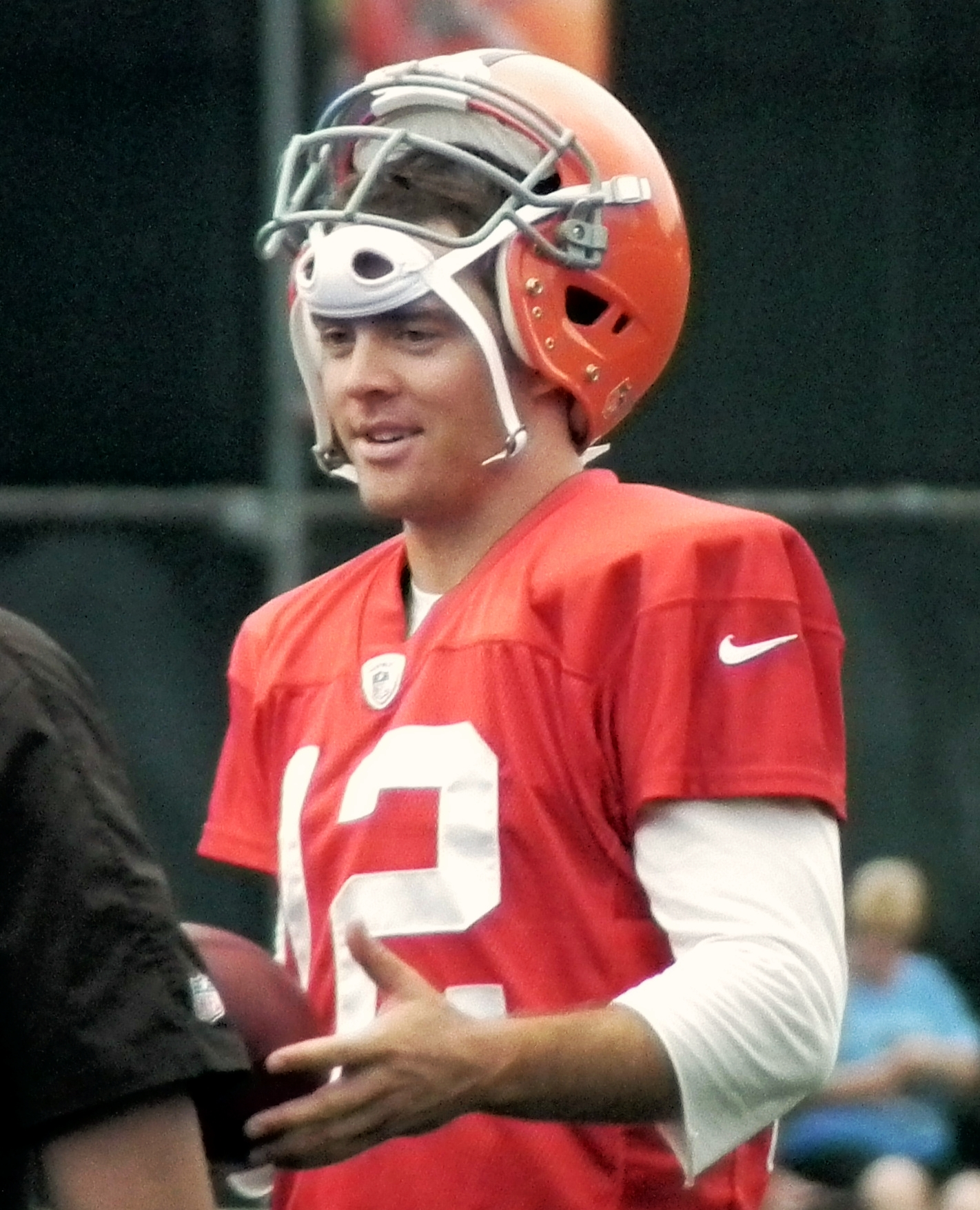
McCoy in 2012

McCoy spent the 2012 season backing up Browns' rookie first round pick Brandon Weeden. When Weeden was injured against the Denver Broncos, McCoy completed nine of 17 pass attempts for 79 yards.

=== San Francisco 49ers ===
On April 1, 2013, the Browns traded McCoy and a 2013 sixth round pick to the San Francisco 49ers in exchange for San Francisco's fifth and seventh round picks in the 2013 NFL Draft.

=== Washington Redskins ===
McCoy signed with the Washington Redskins on April 3, 2014.

During Week 7 against the Tennessee Titans, McCoy replaced Kirk Cousins after halftime, with Washington trailing 10–6 and Cousins having caused two turnovers. On his first pass, McCoy completed a 70-yd touchdown pass to Pierre Garçon. McCoy then went on to lead the Redskins on a game-winning drive, winning the game 19–17. On October 27, McCoy was named the starter over Cousins, and had his first start on the team against the Dallas Cowboys. In his first start since 2011, McCoy completed 25 of 30 passes for 300 yards with a rushing touchdown and an interception, earning an overtime victory against the Cowboys, his favorite team growing up. The team benched him for injured starting quarterback Robert Griffin III after McCoy's two victories. The team lost the next 3 games without McCoy. On November 25, it was reported that McCoy would replace the benched Griffin III in the November 30 game against the Indianapolis Colts. McCoy was placed on injured reserve on December 16 due to a neck injury he suffered in a shutout loss to the St. Louis Rams.

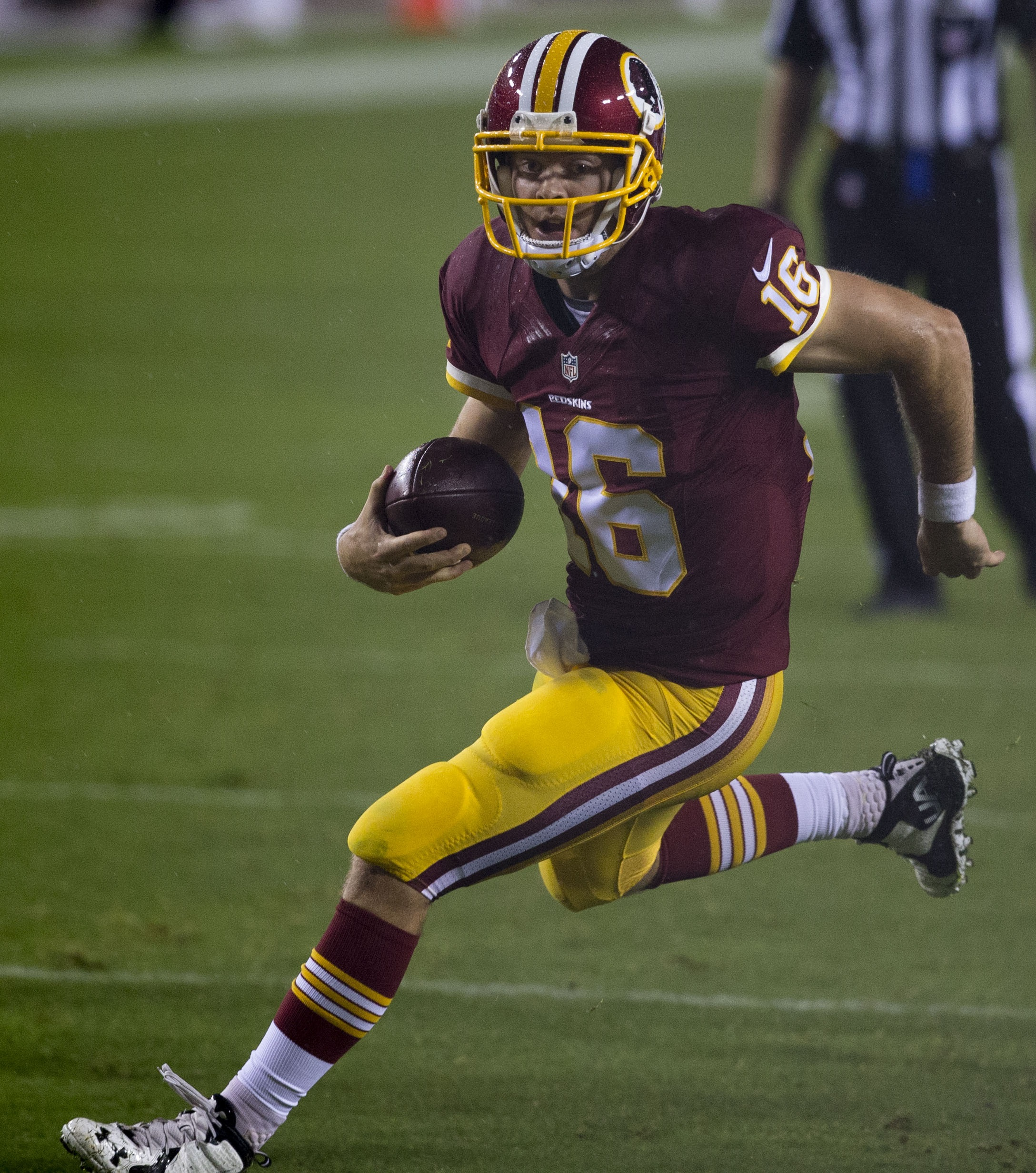
McCoy rushing in 2015

McCoy re-signed with Washington on March 17, 2015. He spent the regular season as Kirk Cousins' backup, getting into two games and going 7-for-11 for 128 yards and one touchdown for the 2015 season. McCoy signed a three-year contract extension with Washington on March 9, 2016, signing a one-year extension once that ran out on July 26, 2018.

In the 2016 and 2017 seasons, McCoy saw only four offensive snaps as the backup to Kirk Cousins, all of which occurred in the latter season.

On November 18, 2018, McCoy replaced an injured Alex Smith against the Houston Texans. His first throw was an eight-yard touchdown pass to Jordan Reed. He was named the starter the following week after the season-ending injury to Smith. In Week 13 against the Philadelphia Eagles, McCoy left the game in the second quarter with a leg injury during a sack by Malcolm Jenkins. He missed the next three games before being placed on injured reserve on December 27, 2018. He completed 34 of 54 passes for 372 yards with three touchdowns and three interceptions in three games played that season.

Prior to Week 5 of the 2019 season, McCoy was named the starting quarterback over Case Keenum. In Week 5 against the New England Patriots, McCoy threw for 122 yards and one interception in the 33–7 loss. The Patriots game was McCoy's lone appearance of the 2019 season

=== New York Giants ===
On March 26, 2020, McCoy signed with the New York Giants. McCoy made his first appearance for the Giants in Week 12 against the Cincinnati Bengals after starter Daniel Jones left the game in the third quarter with a hamstring injury. McCoy was then named the starter for the Giants’ Week 13 matchup against the Seattle Seahawks after Jones was ruled out with a hamstring injury. Against the Seahawks, McCoy threw for 105 yards, a touchdown, and an interception as the Giants upset the Seahawks 17–12, giving McCoy his first win since 2014. McCoy also started against his former team the Cleveland Browns in Week 15 where he threw for 221 yards in a 20–6 loss.

=== Arizona Cardinals ===
McCoy signed a one-year deal with the Arizona Cardinals on March 30, 2021. In Week 9 with quarterback Kyler Murray ruled out, McCoy was named the starter against the San Francisco 49ers. He completed 22 out of 26 passes with a touchdown as the Cardinals won 31–17. He started in three games for the Cardinals in the 2021 season, going 2–1 and passing for three touchdowns and one interception.

On March 14, 2022, McCoy signed a two-year contract extension with the Cardinals. On September 7, he was placed on injured reserve with a calf injury. He was activated on October 15. During Week 10, McCoy made the start in place of Murray. He passed for 238 yards and a touchdown in the 27–17 victory over the Los Angeles Rams. After Murray suffered a torn ACL in Week 14, McCoy assumed starting quarterback duties. However, after suffering a concussion in Week 15 against the Denver Broncos, he was replaced by Trace McSorley. David Blough would start the final two games of the season as McCoy was held out due to concussion symptoms.

On August 28, 2023, McCoy, who was expected to be the starter opening the 2023 season, was surprisingly released by the Cardinals as part of final roster cuts before the start of the 2023 season. McCoy was still recovering from elbow surgery and thus required numerous off days. He was only able to play four drives during their last preseason game and coach Jonathan Gannon cited his overall body of work and production as to why McCoy was released.

McCoy was frequently cited in the media as an option when other quarterbacks were injured, and even had a workout with the Vikings a few months after being cut, but he was not signed during the 2023 season. McCoy spent much of the season rehabbing his elbow and in early 2024 said he was still open to returning as a player in 2024, but also looking at coaching or even politics.

== Career statistics ==
=== NFL ===
Year	Team	Games			Passing								Rushing				Sacks	
Year	Team	GP	GS	Record	Cmp	Att	Pct	Yds	Avg	TD	Int	Rtg	Att	Yds	Avg	TD	Sck	SckY
2010	CLE	8	8	2–6	135	222	60.8	1,576	7.1	6	9	74.5	28	136	4.9	**1**	23	132
2011	CLE	**13**	**13**	4–9	**265**	**463**	57.2	**2,733**	5.9	**14**	**11**	74.6	**61**	**212**	3.5	0	**32**	**173**
2012	CLE	3	0	–	9	17	52.9	79	4.6	1	0	85.2	4	15	3.8	0	4	25
2013	SF	4	0	–	1	1	**100.0**	13	**13.0**	0	0	118.7	6	−6	−1.0	0	0	0
2014	WAS	5	4	1–3	91	128	71.1	1,057	8.3	4	3	96.4	16	66	4.1	**1**	17	117
2015	WAS	2	0	–	7	11	63.6	128	11.6	1	0	**133.9**	3	−3	−1.0	0	1	13
2016	WAS	0	0	–	DNP													
2017	WAS	1	0	–	0	0	0.0	0	0.0	0	0	0.0	0	0	0.0	0	0	0
2018	WAS	3	2	0–2	34	54	63.0	372	6.9	3	3	78.6	10	63	6.3	0	6	36
2019	WAS	1	1	0–1	18	27	66.7	122	4.5	0	1	61.0	2	14	**7.0**	0	6	44
2020	NYG	4	2	1–1	40	66	60.6	375	5.7	1	1	75.0	9	12	1.3	0	5	24
2021	ARI	8	3	**2–1**	74	99	74.7	740	7.5	3	1	101.4	22	37	1.7	0	6	40
2022	ARI	4	3	1–2	90	132	68.2	780	5.9	1	3	76.6	14	36	2.6	0	13	97
Career		56	36	11–25	764	1,220	62.6	7,975	6.5	34	32	79.9	175	582	3.3	2	113	701

=== College ===
Legend
	Led the NCAA
**Bold**	Career high

Year	Team	Games			Passing								Rushing			
Year	Team	GP	GS	Record	Cmp	Att	Pct	Yds	Avg	TD	Int	Rtg	Att	Yds	Avg	TD
2005	Texas	Redshirt (redshirt)														
2006	Texas	13	13	10–3	217	318	68.2	2,570	8.1	29	7	161.8	68	170	2.5	2
2007	Texas	13	13	10–3	276	424	65.1	3,303	7.8	22	**18**	139.2	114	510	**4.5**	4
2008	Texas	13	13	12–1	332	433	**76.7**	**3,859**	**8.9**	**34**	8	**173.8**	**136**	**561**	4.1	**11**
2009	Texas	**14**	**14**	**13–1**	**332**	**470**	70.6	3,521	7.5	27	12	147.4	129	348	2.7	3
Total		53	53	45–8	1,157	1,645	70.3	13,253	8.1	112	45	155.0	447	1,589	3.6	20

== Career highlights ==
=== Awards and honors ===
College

- BCS national champion (2006)
- 2006 "All freshman Team" by College Football News
- 2006 "National Freshman of the Year" by The Sporting News and the Touchdown Club of Columbus
- 2006 Big 12 Offensive Newcomer of the Year by the Associated Press.
- 2006 Valero Alamo Bowl Offensive MVP
- 2008 Pacific Life Holiday Bowl Offensive MVP
- 2008 Big 12 Offensive Player of the Year by the Associated Press
- 2008 Second-team All-Big 12 by the Associated Press
- 2008 NCAA completion percentage leader
- 2008 Walter Camp Award by the Walter Camp Foundation
- 2008 First-team All-America by the Walter Camp Foundation, FWAA, and Sports Illustrated
- 2008 Archie Griffin Award
- 2008 co-Sporting News Player of the Year
- 2008 Heisman Memorial Trophy Runner-up
- 2009 Tostitos Fiesta Bowl Offensive MVP
- 2009 NCAA completion percentage leader
- 2009 Unanimous first-team All-American, including first-team honors from by Associated Press, AFCA, FWAA, Walter Camp Foundation, Rivals.com, Scout.com
- 2009 First-team All-Big 12
- 2009 Big 12 Offensive Player of the Year
- 2009 NCAA Quarterback of the Year
- 2009 Johnny Unitas Golden Arm Award
- 2009 Davey O'Brien Award
- 2009 Manning Award
- 2009 Chic Harley Award
- 2009 Maxwell Award
- 2009 Walter Camp Award by the Walter Camp Foundation
- 2009 Sporting News College Athlete of the Year
- 2009 Heisman Memorial Trophy Finalist, 3rd Place
- 2009 AT&T ESPN All-America Player of the Year
- Texas Longhorns #12 retired
- 4x member of the Texas Athletics Directors Honor Roll and the Big 12 Commissioner's List
- UT's student-athletes of the month as a sophomore
- 2008 Allstate/AFCA Good Works Team

Other

- Texas Sports Hall of Fame (2024)

=== Records ===
- Alamo Bowl – Consecutive pass completions (11)
- Fiesta Bowl – Plays, game (66)
- Fiesta Bowl & BCS Bowl – Attempts, game (59)
- Fiesta Bowl & BCS Bowl – Completions, game (41)
- UT – Victories by a freshman (10)
- UT – Passing Yards by a freshman, season (2,570)
- UT – Passing Yards, Season (3,859) (November 27, 2008, vs. Texas A&M, surpassed Major Applewhite)
- UT – Passing Yards, Career (13,253)
- UT – Offensive Yards, Season (4,420)
- UT – Offensive Yards, Career (14,824)
- UT – Touchdown Passes by a freshman, game (6)
- UT – Touchdown Passes by a freshman, season (29)
- UT – Touchdown Passes, Game (6) (October 14, 2006, versus Baylor)
- UT – Touchdown Passes, Season (34) (Broke own record of 29 on November 15, 2008, vs. the Kansas Jayhawks)
- UT – Touchdown Passes, Career (112) (Broke record on September 20, 2008, versus Rice)
- UT – Total Touchdowns, Season (45)
- UT – Total Touchdowns, Career (132) (Broke record on October 18, 2008, versus Missouri)
- UT – Total plays, Season (599)
- UT – Total plays, Career (2,092)
- UT – Passing Attempts, Game: (58) Tied, (January 5, 2009, versus Ohio State Buckeyes), surpassed by Garrett Gilbert in 2010
- UT – Passing Attempts, Season (470)
- UT – Passing Attempts, Career (1645)
- UT – Passing Completions by a freshman, Season (217)
- UT – Passing Completions, Game (41) (January 5, 2009, versus Ohio State Buckeyes)
- UT – Passing Completions, Season (332)
- UT – Passing Completions, Career (1157)
- UT – Fastest to 1,000 yards in a single season (4 games) tied with David Ash, Major Applewhite and James Brown
- UT – Consecutive Games with a Touchdown Pass (29)
- UT – Consecutive Games with two Touchdown Passes (8)
- UT – Games with a Touchdown Pass (48)
- UT – Games with two Touchdown Passes (34)
- UT – Highest Percentage of Completions, Game (minimum 20 attempts) (90.6%)
- UT – Consecutive Passing Completions, Game (18) (October 25, 2008, versus Oklahoma State) (surpassed his own record of 17 on October 18, 2008, versus Missouri).
- UT – Passing Efficiency, Season (173.8)
- UT – Passing Efficiency, Career (155.0)
- UT – Starts, Career (53)
- UT – Games by a quarterback, career (53)
- UT – Most 200 yard passing games, Season (12)
- UT – Most 200 yard passing games, Career (38)
- UT – Consecutive 300 passing yard games, (3)
- UT – Most 300 yard passing games, Season (6)
- UT – Most 300 yard passing games, Career (14)
- UT – Most 300 yard total offense games, Season (11)
- UT – Most 300 yard total offense games, Career (27)
- UT – Most 400 yard passing games, Season (1), tied with Chris Simms and Applewhite
- UT – Most 400 yard passing games, Career (2), tied with Applewhite
- UT – Most 400 yard total offense games, Season (3), broke his own record shared with Young
- UT – Most 400 yard total offense games, Career (5)
- Big 12 & UT – Highest Percentage of Completions, Season (minimum 200 attempts): 76.7%
- Big 12 & UT – Highest Percentage of Completions, Career (minimum 700 attempts): 70.3%
- NCAA, Big 12, & UT – Highest Single Season completion percentage: 76.7%.
- NCAA, Big 12, & UT – Career Wins by a Starting Quarterback: 45 (Took UT Record on November 27, 2008, vs. Texas A&M, surpassed Vince Young. Also most career wins in FBS history), FBS record surpassed by Kellen Moore of Boise State
- NCAA, Big 12, & UT – McCoy is one of three FBS quarterbacks to average 10 wins per season for four seasons.
- NCAA, Big 12, & UT – Touchdown passes by a freshman, 29, tied with David Neill

== Post-playing career ==
On August 19, 2024, McCoy announced his retirement as a player in the NFL. The same day, he announced that he signed on with NBC Sports to cover Big Ten Football as an analyst.

In November of 2024 he was tapped to star in a Progressive Insurance ad, part of a campaign utilizing back-up quarterbacks.

After one season with NBC he announced that he was unlikely to call any more games so that he could focus on his family.

In early 2025 he started a real estate office in Fort Worth. He also hosts the digital series Scheme and Clean Pocket on the Underdog Fantasy network.

== Personal life ==
Colt McCoy is often called "the real McCoy" in media features because of his performance on the field, his leadership, and his personality. On May 29, 2006, he swam 300 yards across a lake to help save the life of Ken Herrington who was having a seizure on a small dock that extended into the privately owned lake.

He was the roommate of his favorite receiving target at Texas, Jordan Shipley. McCoy's father was the roommate of Shipley's father at Abilene Christian University (ACU). Colt's younger brother Case and Jordan's younger brother Jaxon were also roommates at the University of Texas and played the same positions as Colt and Jordan. McCoy's grandfather, Burl McCoy, is a member of the Abilene Christian University Sports Hall of Fame for his exploits as both an athlete and as the former women's basketball coach.

McCoy is a member of the Churches of Christ and attended Westover Hills Church of Christ in Austin, Texas. When living in Buffalo Gap, he attended and was very involved with the Oldham Lane Church of Christ. McCoy has participated in a church youth group since 2002. His work has included landscaping yards for the elderly, visiting nursing homes, helping with meals on wheels, and ministry.

On January 12, 2010, McCoy became engaged to his girlfriend, Rachel Glandorf, a former middle-distance track and field athlete for Baylor University, by proposing on the video scoreboard at Darrell K Royal-Texas Memorial Stadium in Austin. Their marriage took place on July 17, 2010. They have two daughters and a son.

McCoy is a Republican, showing support for President Donald Trump and publicly advocating for Ken Paxton in the Senate election in Texas in October 2026.

== See also ==
- List of Texas Longhorns football All-Americans
- List of Division I FBS passing yardage leaders
- List of Division I FBS passing touchdown leaders
