= Jim Ned Creek =

Location
- Country: United States
- State: Texas

Physical characteristics
- Source
  - location: 31.8355°N 99.1162°W

Jim Ned Creek is a river in Texas. The stream rises outside of Tuscola and flows southeast for approximately 70 miles to Pecan Bayou at Lake Brownwood. The elevation is 434 metres. Jim Need Creek was dammed in 1966 to form Lake Coleman. The creek is named after Jim Ned, who was an Indian cavalry scout for the US Army.

The stream has two tributaries: East Jim Ned Creek in southeastern Taylor County and South Fork of Jim Ned Creek in northwestern Coleman County.

== See also ==
- List of rivers of Texas
