= Buffalo Gap Historic Village =

- Old Taylor County Courthouse and Jail
- U.S. National Register of Historic Places
- Recorded Texas Historic Landmark
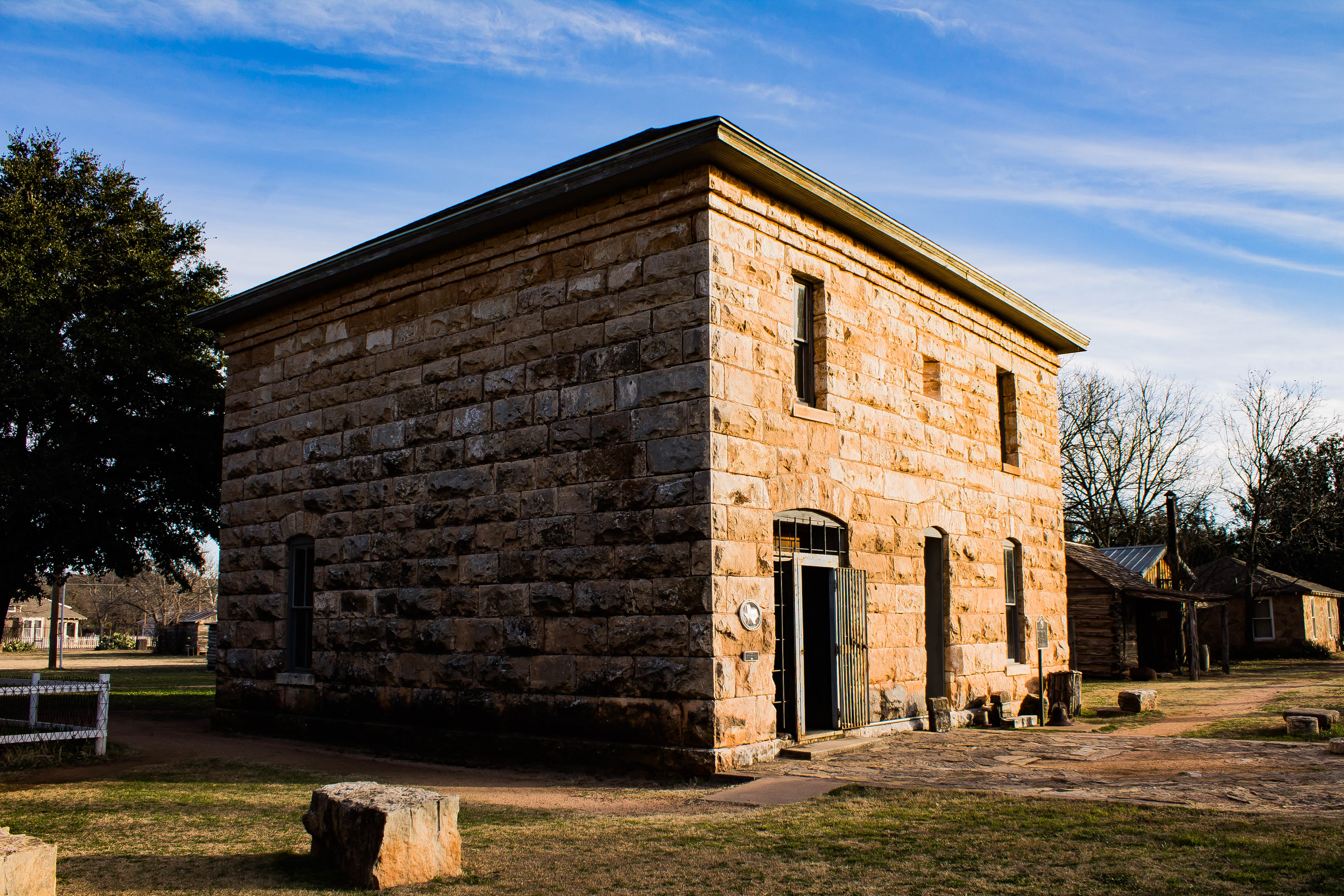

- Location within Texas Location within the United States
- Location: William St. between North and Elm Sts., Buffalo Gap, Texas
- Coordinates: 32°17′10″N 99°49′36″W
- Area: less than one acre
- Built: 1879
- Architect: Martin, Bryne & Johnston
- NRHP reference No.: 78002984
- RTHL No.: 1597
- Added to NRHP: June 9, 1978

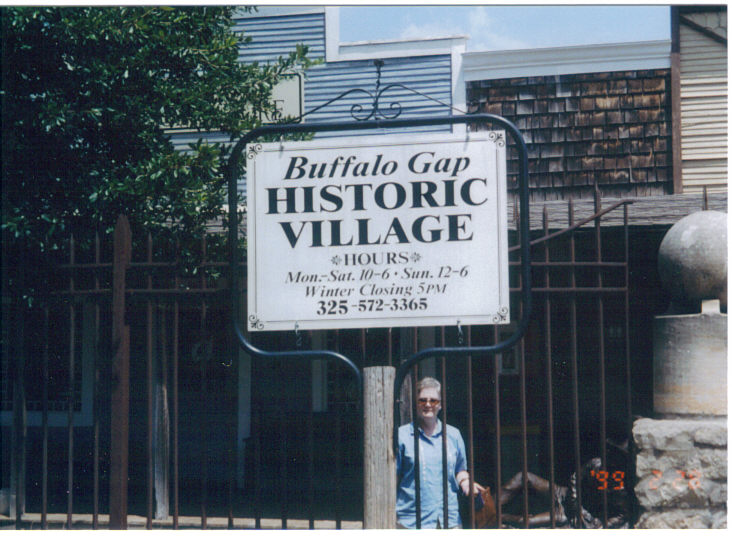
Entrance to Buffalo Gap Historic Village in Buffalo Gap, Texas

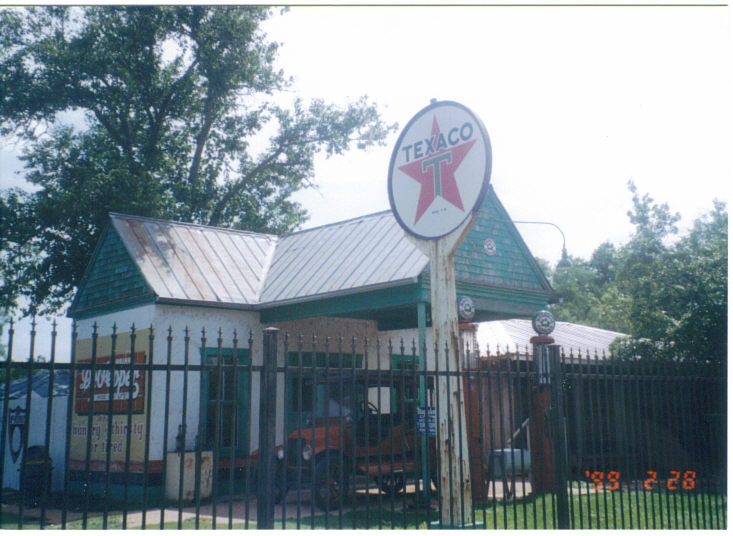
Historic gasoline station at Buffalo Gap

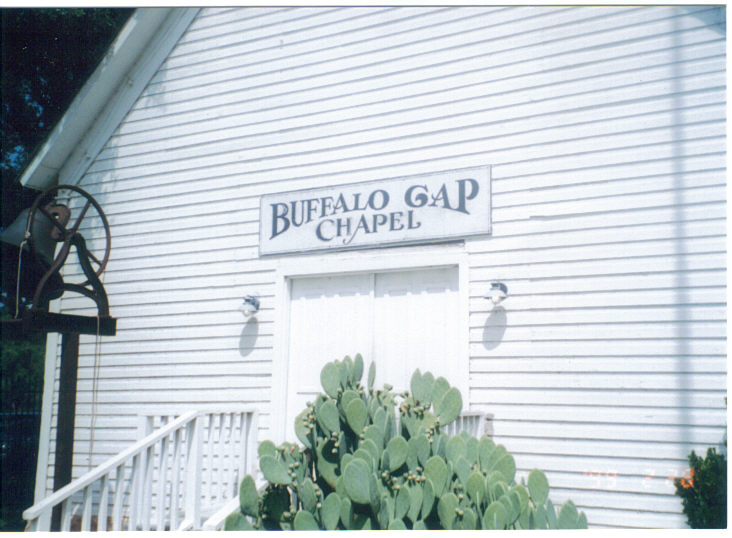
Rustic chapel at Buffalo Gap

Buffalo Gap Historic Village is a museum complex of historic buildings in Buffalo Gap, Texas, near Abilene. Elements of the complex are listed on the National Register of Historic Places.

== See also ==
- National Register of Historic Places listings in Taylor County, Texas
- List of county courthouses in Texas
