= Sunshine Parker =

American character actor (1927–1999)

- Born: Lloyd Olen Parker; June 10, 1927; Lawn, Texas, U.S.
- Died: February 17, 1999 (aged 71); Burbank, California, U.S.
- Occupation: Actor
- Years active: 1950–1994

Lloyd Olen "Sunshine" Parker (June 10, 1927 – February 17, 1999) was an American character actor. He is best known for his roles as Emmett in Road House and Edgar Deems in Tremors. He typically played minor roles as either a "bum" or an "old codger/geezer" stock character.

Parker died on February 17, 1999, in Burbank, California of pneumonia at the age of 71.

== Filmography ==
=== Film ===
- Hometown U.S.A. (1979) - Derelict
- Heart Beat (1980) - Gas Station Attendant
- Oh, God! Book II (1980) - Railroad Station Derelict
- Any Which Way You Can (1980) - Old Codger
- Spittin' Image (1982) - Pete
- Cannery Row (1982) - Maxie "The Seer" Baker
- Kiss My Grits (1983) - Old Geezer
- The Sure Thing (1985) - Cowboy Guy
- Pee-wee's Big Adventure (1985) - Hobo
- Double Revenge (1988) - Old Drunkard
- Sundown: The Vampire in Retreat (1989) - Merle
- Road House (1989) - Emmet
- Tremors (1990) - Edgar Deems
- Love At Large (1990) - Ranch Foreman

=== TV ===
- Bonanza (1969–1970) - Wally / Bum #1 / Charley-Boy
- Little House on the Prairie (1974–1983) - Sheriff / Parley / Workman / Freight Man / Driver
- Mr. Horn (1979) - Vern Laughoff
- The Dukes of Hazzard (1979) - Sunshine
- AfterMASH (1984) - The Vagrant / Derelict / Vagrant
- The Adventures of Brisco County, Jr. (1993) - Stagecoach Driver #2
- Love Street (1994) - Jack (final appearance)
