= Abilene Fire Station No. 2 =

- U.S. National Register of Historic Places
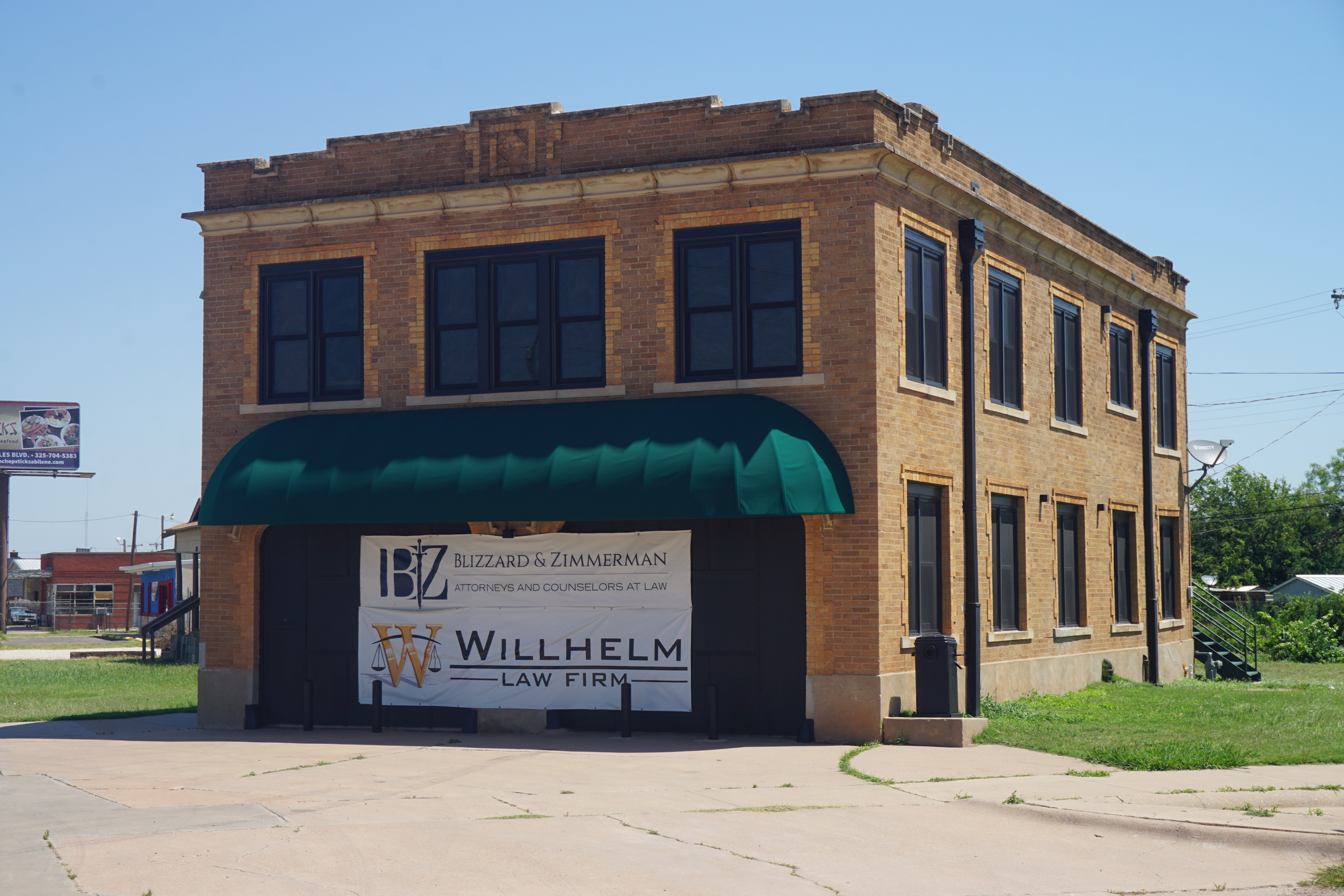

- Location within Texas
- Location: 441 Butternut, Abilene, Texas
- Coordinates: 32°26′41″N 99°44′15″W
- Area: less than one acre
- Built: 1926
- Architectural style: Late 19th And 20th Century Revivals
- MPS: Abilene MPS
- NRHP reference No.: 92000200
- Added to NRHP: March 23, 1992

The Abilene Fire Station No. 2, at 441 Butternut in Abilene, Texas, was built in 1926. It was listed on the National Register of Historic Places in 1992.

It was deemed to be "Abilene's best and least altered example of a local government building. It is the city's only fire station that retains its integrity and stands as a vivid reminder of municipal efforts to provide basic services for local residents."
