= Stewart Mandel =

American sportswriter

Stewart Lance Mandel is an American sportswriter who focuses on college football and college basketball. He is the editor-in-chief of college football coverage for The Athletic. Mandel has covered college football for Sports Illustrated and Fox Sports.

Mandel was raised in Cincinnati, attending Sycamore High School, and is a graduate of Northwestern University (1998) with a degree in journalism.

Writing in Gelf Magazine, David Goldenberg noted that Mandel "has a broad perspective on the sport [of college football] and its various constituencies". Beginning in 1999, Mandel worked for SI.com, where he wrote the "College Football Mailbag" (The Mailbag) column, numerous individual features, and analyses of various games. Mandel described his job as primarily "attempting to explain to irrational college football fan bases across the country just how illogical the current system of college football is". He also wrote about men's college basketball. He was an AP voter in the NCAA Football AP poll but gave the duty up to fellow SI.com writer Andy Staples.

In 2007, Mandel released his first book: Bowls, Polls, and Tattered Souls: Tackling the Chaos and Controversy that Reign Over College Football. A review in The New York Times complimented the book's "breezy, airy tone" and Mandel's ability to be "sarcastic without being cynical and critical without sounding jaded" during the "intricate tour through the ills of the college football world."

In February 2009, SI.com announced Mandel would be taking a sabbatical from the site "to work on other projects. He returned in early July."

A practicing Jew, Mandel once held off from writing his featured SI.com sports blog during and in observance of Yom Kippur when it fell on a game day during the college football season.

In June 2014, Fox Sports announced it had hired Mandel as senior columnist covering college football and basketball. He wrote his first column for FoxSports.com on July 8, 2014.

Mandel began working at The Athletic in 2016. He is currently the editor-in-chief of the college football site.
