= Lawn, Texas =

- Town
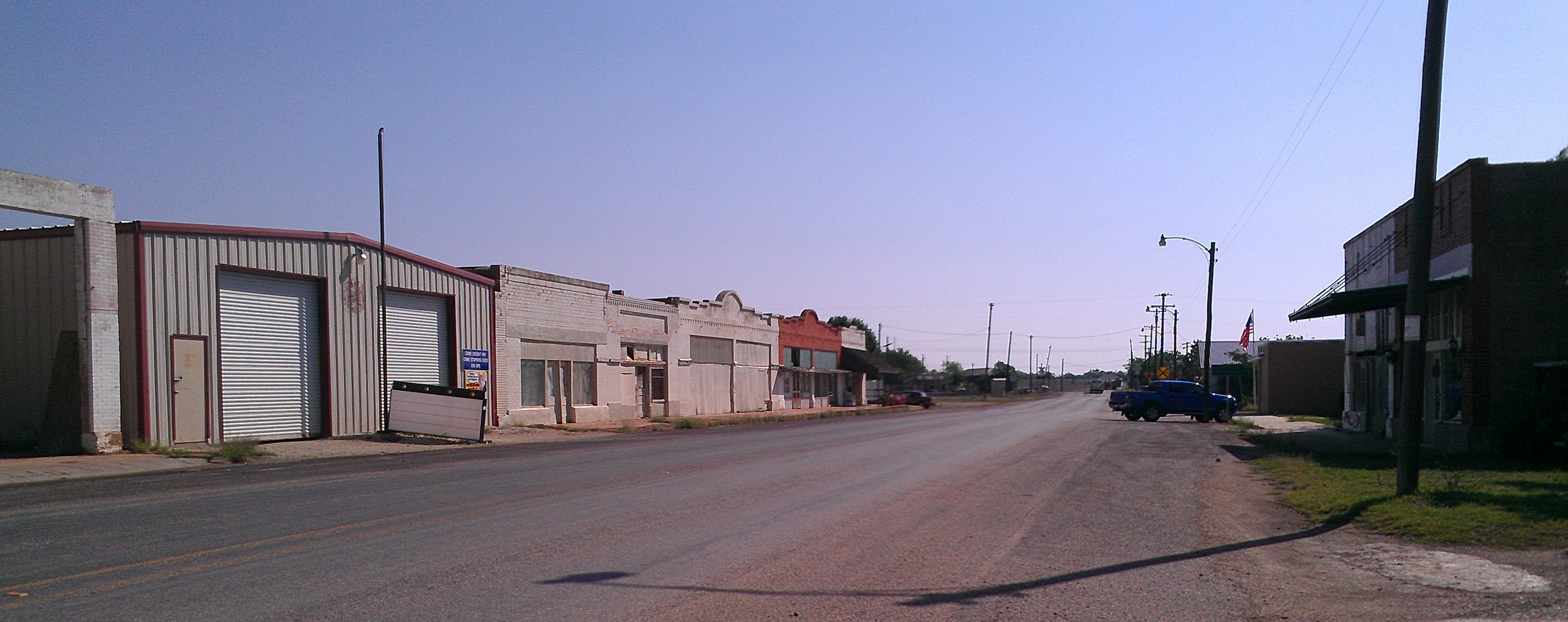
- Facing East on Farm to Market 604 in Lawn, Texas.

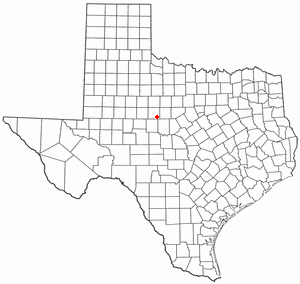
- Location of Lawn, Texas

- Coordinates: 32°08′10″N 99°44′53″W
- Country: United States
- State: Texas
- County: Taylor

Area
  - Total: 0.59 sq mi (1.54 km^{2})
  - Land: 0.59 sq mi (1.54 km^{2})
  - Water: 0 sq mi (0.00 km^{2})
- Elevation: 1,923 ft (586 m)

Population (2020)
  - Total: 311
  - Density: 523/sq mi (202/km^{2})
- Time zone: UTC-6 (Central (CST))
  - Summer (DST): UTC-5 (CDT)
- ZIP code: 79530
- Area code: 325
- FIPS code: 48-41872
- GNIS feature ID: 2412882
- Website: cityoflawntx.com

Lawn is a town in Taylor County, Texas, United States. As of the 2020 census, the town population was 311. It is part of the Abilene metropolitan area.

== Geography ==
According to the United States Census Bureau, the town has a total area of 0.6 square mile (1.5 km^{2}), all land.

=== Climate ===
The climate in this area is characterized by hot, humid summers and generally mild to cool winters. According to the Köppen climate classification, Lawn has a humid subtropical climate, Cfa on climate maps.

Climate data for Lawn, Texas (1991–2020)
Month	Jan	Feb	Mar	Apr	May	Jun	Jul	Aug	Sep	Oct	Nov	Dec	Year
Average precipitation inches (mm)	1.12 (28)	1.45 (37)	1.92 (49)	1.71 (43)	2.80 (71)	3.26 (83)	2.15 (55)	2.27 (58)	2.98 (76)	2.79 (71)	1.44 (37)	1.10 (28)	24.99 (636)
Average snowfall inches (cm)	0.2 (0.51)	0.4 (1.0)	0.0 (0.0)	0.1 (0.25)	0.0 (0.0)	0.0 (0.0)	0.0 (0.0)	0.0 (0.0)	0.0 (0.0)	0.0 (0.0)	0.5 (1.3)	0.3 (0.76)	1.5 (3.82)
Average precipitation days (≥ 0.01 in)	3.0	3.7	4.6	3.4	5.6	5.7	3.9	4.4	4.0	4.9	3.7	2.8	49.7
Average snowy days (≥ 0.01 in)	0.2	0.2	0	0	0	0	0	0	0	0	0.2	0.2	0.8
Source: NOAA

== Demographics ==
Historical population
Census	Pop.	Note	%±
1930	339		—
1940	306		−9.7%
1950	311		1.6%
1960	310		−0.3%
1970	344		11.0%
1980	390		13.4%
1990	358		−8.2%
2000	353		−1.4%
2010	314		−11.0%
2020	311		−1.0%
U.S. Decennial Census

=== 2020 census ===
Lawn racial composition (NH = Non-Hispanic) (Note: Note: the US Census treats Hispanic/Latino as an ethnic category. This table excludes Latinos from the racial categories and assigns them to a separate category. Hispanics/Latinos can be of any race.)
Race	Number	Percentage
White (NH)	255	81.99%
Native American or Alaska Native (NH)	4	1.29%
Multiracial (NH)	8	2.57%
Hispanic or Latino	44	14.15%
Total	311	

As of the 2020 United States census, 311 people, 145 households, and 92 families were residing in the town.

=== 2000 census ===
As of the 2000 census,353 people, 137 households, and 100 families resided in the town. The population density was 625.5 inhabitants per square mile (241.5/km^{2}). The 162 housing units had an average density of 287.1 per square mile (110.8/km^{2}). The racial makeup of the town was 96.88% White, 0.28% Native American, 0.28% Asian, 0.57% Pacific Islander, 1.13% from other races, and 0.85% from two or more races. Hispanics or Latinos of any race were 8.22% of the population.

Of the 137 households, 38.7% had children under 18 living with them, 57.7% were married couples living together, 10.9% had a female householder with no husband present, and 27.0% were not families. About 24.8% of all households were made up of individuals, and 14.6% had someone living alone who was 65 or older. The average household size was 2.58, and the average family size was 3.04.

In the town, the age distribution was 27.2% under 18, 6.2% from 18 to 24, 27.2% from 25 to 44, 24.6% from 45 to 64, and 14.7% who were 65 or older. The median age was 39 years. For every 100 females, there were 101.7 males. For every 100 females 18 and over, there were 91.8 males.

The median income in the town for a household was $28,281 and for a family was $29,625. Males had a median income of $25,000 versus $17,500 for females. The per capita income for the town was $13,347. About 15.2% of families and 19.8% of the population were below the poverty line, including 29.0% of those under 18 and 7.3% of those 65 or over.

== Education ==
The town of Lawn is served by the Jim Ned Consolidated Independent School District.

== Notable person ==
- Sunshine Parker (1927–1999) is a stage name for Lloyd Olen Parker, known for roles, including Emmitt in Road House, and many character roles in movies and television.
