= Tuscola, Texas =

- City
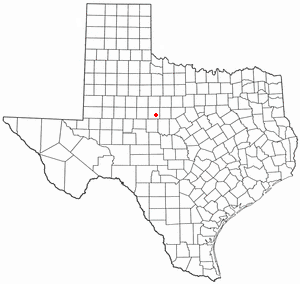
- Location of Tuscola, Texas

- Coordinates: 32°12′41″N 99°47′54″W
- Country: United States
- State: Texas
- County: Taylor

Area
  - Total: 0.85 sq mi (2.20 km^{2})
  - Land: 0.85 sq mi (2.20 km^{2})
  - Water: 0 sq mi (0.00 km^{2})
- Elevation: 1,978 ft (603 m)

Population (2020)
  - Total: 850
  - Density: 1,000/sq mi (390/km^{2})
- Time zone: UTC-6 (Central (CST))
  - Summer (DST): UTC-5 (CDT)
- ZIP code: 79562
- Area code: 325
- FIPS code: 48-74048
- GNIS feature ID: 2412116
- Website: https://www.cityoftuscolatx.com/

Tuscola is a city in Taylor County, Texas, United States. Its population was 850 at the 2020 census. It is part of the Abilene metropolitan area.

== Geography ==
According to the United States Census Bureau, the city has a total area of 0.7 square mile (1.9 km^{2}), all land.

=== Climate ===
The climate in this area is characterized by hot, humid summers and generally mild to cool winters. According to the Köppen climate classification, Tuscola has a humid subtropical climate, Cfa on climate maps.

Climate data for Tuscola, Texas (1991–2020)
Month	Jan	Feb	Mar	Apr	May	Jun	Jul	Aug	Sep	Oct	Nov	Dec	Year
Average precipitation inches (mm)	1.09 (28)	1.47 (37)	1.95 (50)	2.34 (59)	3.56 (90)	3.89 (99)	2.09 (53)	2.33 (59)	3.13 (80)	2.62 (67)	1.61 (41)	1.23 (31)	27.31 (694)
Average snowfall inches (cm)	0.4 (1.0)	0.1 (0.25)	0.1 (0.25)	0.3 (0.76)	0.0 (0.0)	0.0 (0.0)	0.0 (0.0)	0.0 (0.0)	0.0 (0.0)	0.0 (0.0)	0.2 (0.51)	0.2 (0.51)	1.3 (3.28)
Average precipitation days (≥ 0.01 in)	4.4	3.7	4.7	4.2	6.8	5.4	3.6	4.7	5.0	4.9	4.2	3.4	55
Average snowy days (≥ 0.01 in)	0.3	0.2	0	0.1	0	0	0	0	0	0	0.1	0.1	0.8
Source: NOAA

== Demographics ==
Historical population
Census	Pop.	Note	%±
1950	497		—
1960	414		−16.7%
1970	497		20.0%
1980	660		32.8%
1990	620		−6.1%
2000	714		15.2%
2010	742		3.9%
2020	850		14.6%
U.S. Decennial Census

=== 2020 census ===
As of the 2020 census, Tuscola had a population of 850, 314 households, and 203 families. The median age was 35.3 years; 29.5% of the residents were under 18 and 13.4% were 65 or older. For every 100 females, there were 94.1 males, and for every 100 females 18 and over, there were 91.4 males 18 and over.

None of the residents lived in urban areas, while 100.0% lived in rural areas.

Of the 314 households in Tuscola, 42.4% had children under 18 living in them, 58.3% were married-couple households, 16.6% were households with a male householder and no spouse or partner present, and 19.4% were households with a female householder and no spouse or partner present. About 15.0% of all households were made up of individuals, and 8.6% had someone living alone who was 65 years of age or older.

The city had 339 housing units, of which 7.4% were vacant. The homeowner vacancy rate was 2.4% and the rental vacancy rate was 1.4%.

Racial composition as of the 2020 census
Race	Number	Percent
White	742	87.3%
Black or African American	4	0.5%
American Indian and Alaska Native	10	1.2%
Asian	1	0.1%
Native Hawaiian and other Pacific Islander	0	0.0%
Some other race	32	3.8%
Two or more races	61	7.2%
Hispanic or Latino (of any race)	107	12.6%

=== 2000 census ===
As of the census of 2000, 714 people, 273 households, and 202 families resided in the city. The population density was 971.2 inhabitants per square mile (375.0/km^{2}). There were 307 housing units at an average density of 417.6 per square mile (161.2/km^{2}). The racial makeup of the city was 97.20% White, 0.14% African American, 0.28% Native American, 0.14% Asian, 0.70% from other races, and 1.54% from two or more races. Hispanics or Latinos of any race were 7.28% of the population.

Of the 273 households, 37.4% had children under 18 living with them, 61.5% were married couples living together, 10.6% had a female householder with no husband present, and 26.0% were not families. About 23.8% of all households were made up of individuals, and 12.8% had someone living alone who was 65 or older. The average household size was 2.62, and the average family size was 3.08.

In the city, the age distribution was 28.6% under 18, 7.3% from 18 to 24, 27.9% from 25 to 44, 23.4% from 45 to 64, and 12.9% who were 65 or older. The median age was 37 years. For every 100 females, there were 89.9 males. For every 100 females 18 and over, there were 87.5 males.

The median income in the city for a household was $38,068 and for a family was $42,396. Males had a median income of $31,484 versus $21,845 for females. The per capita income for the city was $18,661. About 3.7% of families and 6.8% of the population were below the poverty line, including 5.5% of those under 18 and 15.7% of those 65 or over.

== Education ==
The city of Tuscola is served by the Jim Ned Consolidated Independent School District and home to the Jim Ned High School Indians.

== Notable people ==
- Colt McCoy, football quarterback for the Texas Longhorns, Cleveland Browns, and Arizona Cardinals
- Rick Roderick, prominent philosopher and professor
- Ed Sprinkle, former American football player and coach
