= Rio Grande Silvery Minnow v. Bureau of Reclamation =

Supreme Court case

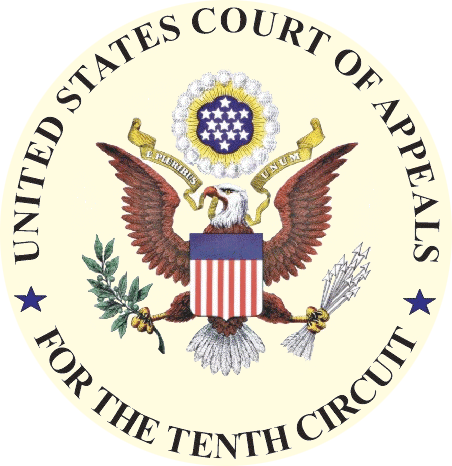
- Court: United States Court of Appeals for the Tenth Circuit
- Decided: 21 April 2010
- Citation: 601 F.3d 1096 (2010)

Court membership
- Judges sitting: Seymour, Porfilio and Kelly

Case opinions
- Provision of water for fish and wildlife is a beneficial use of the water resources

Keywords
- Environmental protection; Restoration

Rio Grande Silvery Minnow v. Bureau of Reclamation, called Rio Grande Silvery Minnow v. Keys (Note: The name Rio Grande Silvery Minnow v. Keys came from the first named defendant, John W. Keys, Commissioner of the United States Bureau of Reclamation. Keys retired from the Bureau of Reclamation in 2006 and died in 2008 before the case had been resolved.) in its earlier phases, was a case launched in 1999 by a group of environmentalists against the United States Bureau of Reclamation and the United States Army Corps of Engineers alleging violations of the Endangered Species Act and the National Environmental Policy Act. The case resulted in significant changes to water and river management in the Middle Rio Grande Basin of New Mexico in an effort to reverse the damage that had been done to the habitat of two endangered species.

The waters of the middle section of the Rio Grande in New Mexico, running from north to south past the city of Albuquerque, have been used for irrigation for at least 1,000 years. The Middle Rio Grande Conservancy District built new dams, canals and ditches in the 1930s. In the 1950s the Bureau of Reclamation and Corps of Engineers took over responsibility for rehabilitating, maintaining and operating the storage dams and the river channel. The changes drastically affected the habitat of native fish, including the once-common Rio Grande silvery minnow. The minnow was declared endangered in 1994.

In 1999 a group of conservationists filed suit against the Bureau of Reclamation and the Corps of Engineers on the grounds that they had failed to adequately consult with the United States Fish and Wildlife Service, as required under the Endangered Species Act, to determine if action should be taken to avoid jeopardizing the minnow. The case revolved around whether the Bureau of Reclamation had the authority to use water to assist the minnow when this might affect delivery of water under contract to existing users.

The case was effectively settled in favor of the conservationists in 2003. The United States Court of Appeals for the Tenth Circuit stated that provision of water for fish and wildlife is a beneficial use of the water resources, and the Bureau of Reclamation could and should act to assist the minnow. This was confirmed, with reservations about the water that could be used, by the U.S. Congress in "minnow riders" to the Water Development Appropriations Act of 2004. Arguments dragged on over details of the way in which the Bureau of Reclamation was obliged to consult with the Fish and Wildlife Service. The case was finally settled in 2010. However, some issues concerning water allocation and ownership of properties remain open.

== Background ==
=== Irrigation works ===
The Rio Grande slows down and broadens as it runs through the relatively flat land of the Albuquerque Basin. It has cut itself a shallow valley in the semi-arid country that lies on both sides. Irrigation has been practiced in this valley for at least 1,000 years. With encouragement from the Federal government, levels of irrigation rose to a peak in the 1880s. However, irrigation and felling of trees upstream in Colorado added silt to the river that was deposited when the current slowed to the north of Albuquerque. The river bed rose. Fields turned into saline marshes. Floods became more common and more severe.

The Middle Rio Grande Conservancy District was created in 1925 to deal with the problems. It built many miles of new irrigation canals and drains, the El Vado storage dam, four diversion dams to feed water into the canals, and levees to guard against flooding. The Conservancy ran out of money in the 1940s and asked the Federal government for help. The Middle Rio Grande Project was approved in May 1950. The Bureau of Reclamation and the Corps of Engineers rehabilitated the dams and built the new Cochiti Storage Dam, completed in 1975. The Bureau of Reclamation undertook extensive work on the river channel, straightening and strengthening the banks and clearing the floodway. The San Juan–Chama Project, completed in 1976, diverted additional water from the Colorado River basin into the Rio Grande basin.

=== Silvery minnow and willow flycatcher ===
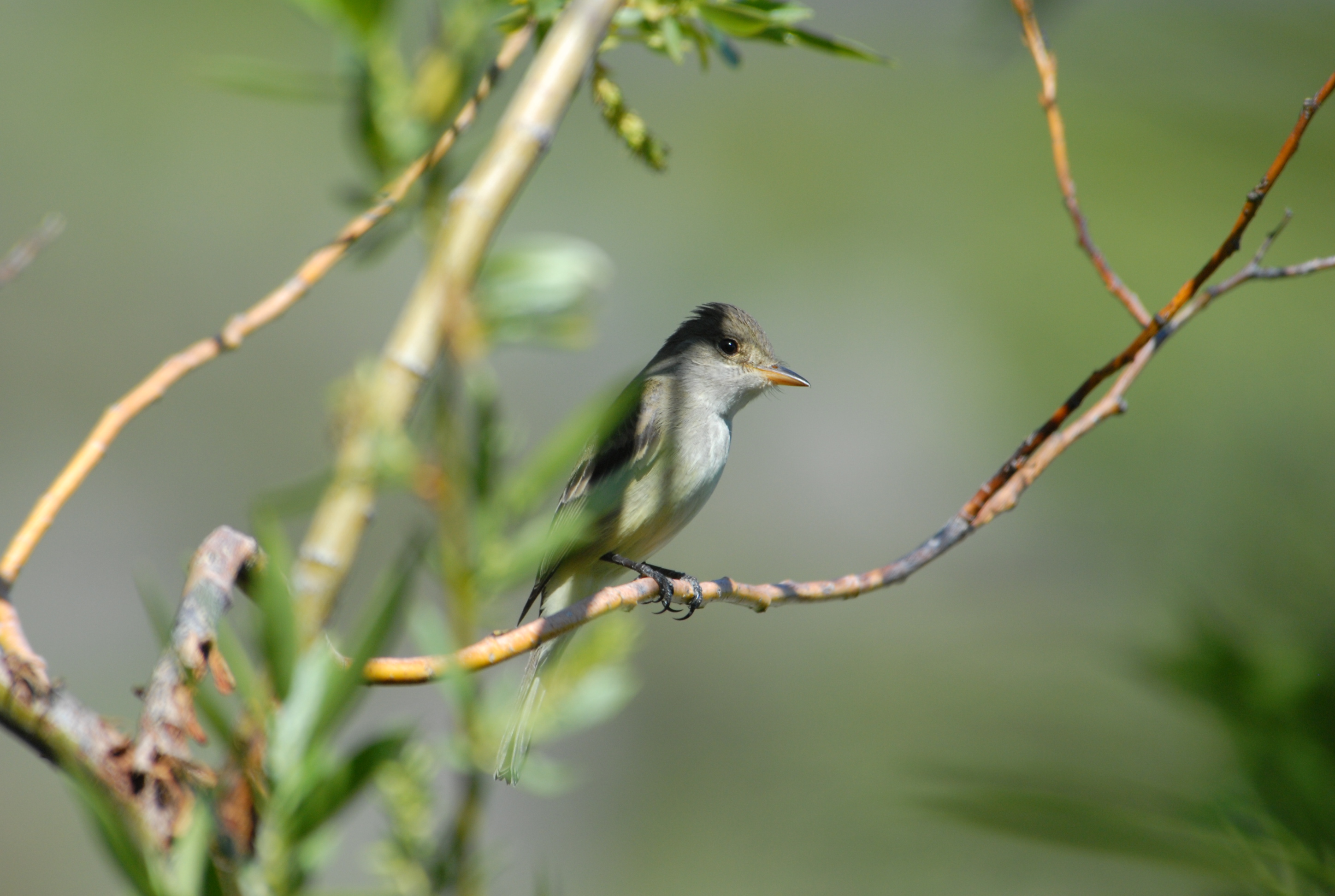
Southwestern willow flycatcher, another plaintiff

The Rio Grande silvery minnow used to be one of the most common fish in the Rio Grande, but due to the irrigation works its numbers started declining dramatically. The diversion dams divide its habitat into four separate segments. Although the river spreads out above the dams, below them it cuts deep channels between islands of sediment. During peak irrigation periods, particularly in dry years, these channels may dry up and confine the fish to any pools that remain. The minnows spawn during spring run-off conditions: large volumes of fast-moving water. The dams and other works reduce the intensity of spring run-off. As summer progresses, by diverting water for irrigation or city use the dams cause stretches of the river to dry up in the San Acacia Reach from the San Acacia Diversion Dam downstream for 59 miles (95 km) to the Elephant Butte Reservoir. Most surviving silvery minnows are found in this reach.

The silvery minnow was classified as endangered in 1994. The minnow had been reduced to 5% of its former habitat when it was listed. In 1996 a period of drought began that was to last for several years. That year, all the river water was diverted at San Acacia. Many of the surviving minnows died. Lowering the water tables and controlling floods has also had a drastic effect on the riparian zone, which had plants and wildlife adapted to wetter conditions and periodic flooding. Invasive species such as Russian olive that are adapted to the drier, more stable environment began choking out native trees and plants. The southwestern willow flycatcher breeds in dense riparian habitats along rivers, streams, or other wetlands, including the Rio Grande near San Marcial. It was placed on the federal Endangered Species list in 1995.

Under the Endangered Species Act, the minnow became protected when it was listed in 1994, and the flycatcher became protected in 1995. Each Federal agency must "insure that any action authorized, funded, or carried out by such agency, is not likely to jeopardize the continued existence of any endangered species or threatened species." The agency must consult with the United States Fish and Wildlife Service, which will formulate a Biological Opinion on the effect of the agency's action on the survival of the species or on critical habitat. This applies to "actions in which there is discretionary Federal involvement or control." Where practical, the Biological Opinion must define Reasonable and Prudent Alternative actions to avoid jeopardizing the endangered species.

== Litigation ==
=== Initial case ===
In 1999 a 163 miles (262 km) stretch of the Rio Grande was designated a critical habitat for the silvery minnow by the Secretary of the Interior. This habitat extended from Cochiti Dam to the north of Albuquerque down to Elephant Butte Reservoir in the south. The Fish and Wildlife Service received a court order to accept the Department of Interior's Rio Grande silvery minnow Recovery Plan and to conduct an Environmental Impact Statement for this stretch of the river. The critical habitat designation was challenged in court by the Middle Rio Grande Conservation District, but was upheld on appeal.

The Defenders of Wildlife, Forest Guardians, National Audubon Society, Sierra Club, and other environmental organizations filed suit in 1999 on behalf of the Rio Grande silvery minnow (Hybognathus amarus) and the Southwestern willow flycatcher (Empisonax trailii extimus) against the Bureau of Reclamation and the Corps of Engineers for failure to fully consult with the Fish and Wildlife Service. The environmental groups made the case that the Bureau of Reclamation and the Corps of Engineers had "significant discretion over virtually all aspects of their funding and operation of the Project, and therefore they must consult with the Fish and Wildlife Service on all of these actions."

Several users of the water intervened, including the State of New Mexico and the Middle Rio Grande Conservancy District. It emerged in the hearings that the Middle Rio Grande Conservancy District had been using 11.36 cubic feet of water for each square foot of irrigated land. The Fish and Wildlife Service issued their first Biological Opinion on 29 June 2001. The Environmental groups filed a second amended complaint in which they contested the validity of the Biological Opinion while repeating their claim that the Bureau of Reclamation and Corps of Engineers had not consulted with the Fish and Wildlife Service to the fullest extent of their discretionary authority. The district court affirmed the 2001 Biological Opinion on 19 April 2002, but left the remaining claims to be resolved later. The Corps of Engineers was held to not have discretion over use of water. However, the court found that the Bureau of Reclamation had discretion over its actions, so the Endangered Species Act required it to consult with the Fish and Wildlife Service. The intervenors and the federal agencies appealed this decision.

=== Biological opinions ===
In 2002 the State of New Mexico and the United States agreed to avert an emergency by allocating up to 100,000 acre-feet (120,000,000 m^{3}) of water as a Conservation Pool for species use, to be held in the Abiquiu and Jemez Canyon reservoirs. The Environmental Groups sought an emergency injunction on 4 September 2002, alleging that the Minnow was being endangered by a drought year. They asked that the court order the federal agencies to release the water needed to meet the flow requirements defined in the 2001 Biological Opinion. On 12 September 2002 the Fish and Wildlife Service issued a new biological opinion which agreed that the Bureau of Reclamation operations probably jeopardized the minnow, but said there was no "Reasonable and Prudent Alternative". On 19 September 2002 the Environmental groups filed another complaint that challenged the 2001 and 2002 Biological Opinions, asked for a legally adequate biological opinion to be prepared and asked that the Federal Agencies "take all steps within their discretionary authority necessary to conserve" the Minnow.

On 23 September 2002 the district court issued a Memorandum Opinion that took both the Bureau of Reclamation and Fish and Wildlife Service to task and said the 2002 Biological Opinion was arbitrary and capricious. The opinion recommended storing water upstream rather than releasing water. The court noted that "one does not quench thirst by withholding water". The court concluded that the Bureau of Reclamation was empowered to restrict the amount of water diverted for irrigation purposes and to release the resulting supply of water to the minnow's environment. The defendants appealed this decision.

On 16 March 2003 the Fish and Wildlife Service issued yet another Biological Opinion. In this Biological Opinion the Fish and Wildlife Service concluded that proposed actions by the Bureau of Reclamation and Corps of Engineers, whether or not they were discretionary, would probably jeopardize the continued existence of the Minnow. The Fish and Wildlife Service defined Reasonable and Prudent Alternatives "based on biological needs of the species, independent of sources of water and discretionary authority." The Bureau of Reclamation presented two proposals for avoiding jeopardy to the minnow. The first assumed that the Bureau of Reclamation did not have the discretion to limit contracted deliveries of water so as to benefit the minnow, but proposed to lease water from willing lessors to enhance river flows as needed. The second assumed it did have discretion, and proposed to spread the shortages between the users.

=== First appeals ===
The Tenth Circuit Court of Appeals heard appeals against the district court decision in April 2003, releasing its ruling on 12 June 2003. Two projects established by act of Congress were involved, both guaranteeing perpetual delivery of water to the city of Albuquerque. The United States had agreed to construct and operate the Middle Rio Grande Project works in exchange for repayment of construction and maintenance costs. With the San Juan–Chama Project, the Bureau of Reclamation was authorized to contract with the city of Albuquerque to supply water in exchange for payment of the costs of building the Heron Dam and enlarging the El Vado Dam. The Bureau of Reclamation claimed it was obliged to supply water under these contracts, and the City of Albuquerque claimed it had a perpetual right to use the water. The State of New Mexico stated that delivering water to sustain fish and wildlife was not a beneficial use. Using water to protect minnows would irreparably harm citizens.

The Tenth Circuit reviewed the contracts and rejected these arguments. The court found that under the contracts the Bureau of Reclamation had discretion to determine how water would be allocated to users, and to determine that other water should be used to prevent jeopardy to an endangered species. The court found that allocating water to the minnow was indeed a beneficial use. The appeals court affirmed the district court's narrowly drawn order addressing carefully limited circumstances, in which it held that the Bureau of Reclamation has discretion to reduce contract deliveries and restrict diversions to meet its duties under the Endangered Species Act. The Court of Appeals quoted the attorney for the plaintiffs-appellees, who called the silvery minnow the equivalent for the Rio Grande of a canary in a coal mine, an essential indicator of the health of the ecosystem.

=== Minnow rider ===
Congress responded to the tenth circuit decision by granting an exemption to the city. In December 2003 Congress added the first "minnow rider" to the Water Development Appropriations Act, 2004, placing San Juan-Chama water beyond the Bureau of Reclamation's discretionary reach. Congress also said that conformance with the Reasonable and Prudent Alternatives and Incidental Take Statements defined in the Fish and Wildlife Service's 2003 Biological Opinion would be deemed to be conformity to the Endangered Species Act for the next two years. (Note: The full text of the minnow rider is as follows: SEC. 208. (a) Notwithstanding any other provision of law and hereafter, the Secretary of the Interior, acting through the Commissioner of the Bureau of Reclamation, may not obligate funds, and may not use discretion, if any, to restrict, reduce or reallocate any water stored in Heron Reservoir or delivered pursuant to San Juan-Chama Project contracts, including execution of said contracts facilitated by the Middle Rio Grande Project, to meet the requirements of the Endangered Species Act, unless such water is acquired or otherwise made available from a willing seller or lessor and the use is in compliance with the laws of the State of New Mexico, including but not limited to, permitting requirements. (b) Complying with the reasonable and prudent alternatives and the incidental take limits defined in the Biological Opinion released by the United States Fish and Wildlife Service dated March 17, 2003 combined with efforts carried out pursuant to Public Law 106-377, Public Law 107-66, and Public Law 108-7 fully meet all requirements of the Endangered Species Act (16 U.S.C. 1531 et seq.) for the conservation of the Rio Grande Silvery Minnow (Hybognathus amarus) and the Southwestern Willow Flycatcher (Empidonax trailii extimus) on the Middle Rio Grande in New Mexico. (c) This section applies only to those Federal agencies and non-Federal actions addressed in the March 17, 2003 Biological Opinion. (d) Subsection (b) will remain in effect for 2 years following the implementation of this Act.) In 2004 Congress extended this to March 2013.

At this point the Fish and Wildlife Service had said, in their 2003 Biological Opinion, what should be done to save the minnow if the water were available. The Bureau of Reclamation had published a plan to implement the measures defined in the Biological Opinion, assuming they were allowed to use water for this purpose. The court had said they had the discretion to use water in this way. Congress had excluded the San Juan-Chama water from discretionary use, although native Rio Grande water was not excluded and San Juan-Chama water could be used if made available by a willing seller or lessor. Congress had said that if the Bureau of Reclamation complied with the 2003 Biological Opinion they would meet the requirements of the Endangered Species Act. The conservationist's focus now shifted to ensuring that the Bureau of Reclamation followed through.

Based on the minnow riders, and since the appeals court had dismissed the district court's preliminary injunction as moot, (Note: "Moot" means that the issue is not relevant, and any discussion is purely an intellectual exercise where the conclusions have no effect. In this case, subsequent decisions and actions had rendered the question hypothetical.) the Environmental groups sought dismissal of the case but asked that the district court's prior orders remain in force. The federal agencies agreed that the case was moot, and asked that prior orders be vacated. The environmental groups then sought to withdraw their motion to dismiss, saying their scope-of-consultation claim was not mooted by intervening events because the violation was likely to recur.

=== Further appeals ===
On 22 November 2005 the district court agreed with the environmental groups that their scope-of-consultation claim was not moot, although their claim to the San Juan - Chama water had been mooted by Congress's decisions. The court said that when the Fish and Wildlife Service issued the 2003 Biological Opinion and the Bureau of Reclamation adopted it, they had acted voluntarily. However, unless they gave assurances that they would continue to operate under the discretionary option in the 2003 Biological Opinion, they had not established mootness. The court made a declaratory judgement that required the Bureau of Reclamation and Fish and Wildlife Service to recognize, in future consultations, that the Bureau of Reclamation had discretion to reallocate project contract water. The court declined to vacate its 2002 memorandum opinions and orders. Yet another appeal followed.

On 21 April 2010 the tenth circuit appeals court remanded the case to the district court to vacate its memorandum opinions and orders of 19 April 2002, 23 September 2002, and 22 November 2005, and to dismiss the environmental groups' complaint with regard to their scope-of-consultation claim under the Endangered Species Act. The appeals court noted that the Bureau of Reclamation had consulted with the Fish and Wildlife Service, and the 2003 Biological Opinion concluded the consultations. The Bureau of Reclamation had then adopted the Biological Opinion. The environmental groups could not point out any concrete ongoing injury. Any question about whether the Bureau of Reclamation and Fish and Wildlife Service would in fact consult again in the event of some future change was too speculative to be considered.

== Results ==
In February 2005 the plaintiffs in the case signed a settlement agreement with the City of Albuquerque and the Albuquerque - Bernalillo County Water Utility Authority that aimed to address the objectives of protecting and restoring the Rio Grande ecology while allowing for development of a reliable water supply to residents of the Albuquerque region. The plaintiffs agreed to dismiss various claims. Albuquerque and the Authority agreed to lease 30,000 acre feet of storage space in the Abiquiu Reservoir, permanently and at no charge, for storage of water acquired by the plaintiffs in order to improve the habitat of threatened and endangered species in the Rio Grande and the bordering bosque, subject to various conditions. The Authority and the city also agreed to help with a water leasing program and help raise funding through voluntary contributions that residents could opt to pay on their water bill.

The Department of Reclamation is working with the United States Fish and Wildlife Service to try to rescue the silvery minnow. A number of projects are being undertaken to restore the silvery minnow's habitat, including a study of ways to allow the fish to pass the San Acacia Diversion Dam. Controlled flooding into the riparian areas is planned to improve the environment of the southwestern willow flycatcher. Despite a series of years of drought, water has been released from upstream reservoirs to supply more water to the habitat of the silvery minnow, and the Department of Reclamation is leasing water from the owners of water rights for this purpose. Water from the Low Flow Conveyance Channel, which runs along the Rio Grande for 58 miles (93 km) from the San Acacia Diversion Dam to the narrows above Elephant Butte Reservoir, is being pumped into sections of the river that regularly run dry.
