= San Acacia, New Mexico =

Unincorporated community in New Mexico, United States

- unincorporated community & census-designated place
- Location within New Mexico
- Coordinates: 34°15′18″N 106°54′08″W
- Country: United States
- State: New Mexico
- County: Socorro County
- Elevation: 4,669 ft (1,423 m)
- Time zone: UTC-7 (Mountain (MST))
  - Summer (DST): UTC-6 (MDT)
- GNIS feature ID: 2584198

San Acacia is a small unincorporated community and census-designated place in Socorro County, New Mexico, United States. As of the 2020 census, San Acacia had a population of 38. It was once a prosperous railway town, but is now largely deserted. There is a nearby diversion dam on the Rio Grande, important in irrigation.

== Location ==
The village lies on the Rio Grande in the Albuquerque Basin. The village is 22 miles (35 km) south of Bernardo and 14 miles (23 km) north of Socorro. It is off Interstate 25 at exit 163. San Acacia is near the southern boundary of the Sevilleta National Wildlife Refuge. San Acacia gives its name to the stretch of the Rio Grande that extends south to the Elephant Butte Reservoir. The nearby San Acacia Diversion Dam is used to transfer water from the river into irrigation channels. When the river is low, the Isleta Diversion Dam, further to the north, and the San Acacia dam can divert all water from the Rio Grande along a 177 kilometres (110 mi) stretch of the river.

== Foundation and growth ==
The settlement of San Acacio was named by the Spanish after Saint Acacius, leader of the ten thousand martyrs of Mount Ararat, an early Christian saint who was crowned with thorns from the acacia tree. The hill to the east of the San Acacio cemetery was the location where, in 1855, John W. Garretson fixed the Initial Point for the Principal Meridian and the Base Line. This is the reference point for all topographic maps of the state of New Mexico.

San Acacio became important in 1878 when the Atchison, Topeka and Santa Fe Railway was built through Socorro County on its route along the Rio Grande to El Paso, Texas. It was incorrectly given the official name of San Acacia after the railway came through.

== Flooding and decline ==
The Rio Grande has very variable volumes where it passes San Acacia. In April the volume may be a few hundred cubic feet per second, but with the spring runoff in May the volume may rise to almost 10,000 cubic feet per second (280 m^{3}/s). In the summer, most of the water comes from unpredictable flash floods carried into the river by ephemeral tributaries. The town lies a few miles south of the point where the Rio Puerco and Rio Salado converge with the Rio Grande. In August 1929 there were torrential rains in the watersheds of these rivers, causing flooding that extended from San Acacia to San Marcial. There was renewed flooding a months later, damaging the railway and destroying all the crops in the valley. Once a prosperous town, many of the buildings including the old church have been abandoned.

== Dam ==
In 1906 the narrow gorge at San Acacia was being considered for a dam. If built to a height of 50 feet (15 m), the dam would be 1,200 feet (370 m) long, and would flood about 18 square miles (47 km^{2}) to an average depth of 25 feet (7.6 m). The drawback was that the basalt that forms the walls of the gorge is a thin sheet resting on loose sand and gravel. It seemed unlikely that there would be solid rock near enough to the surface to form a foundation for the dam, and there would be considerable leakage through the gravels.

A diversion dam was built in 1934 for the Middle Rio Grande Conservancy District, and was rehabilitated by the United States Bureau of Reclamation in 1957 as part of the Middle Rio Grande Project. It is 17 feet (5.2 m) high and 700 feet (210 m) long, a concrete structure with 29 radial gates. The dam serves the Socorro Division, and has a diversion capacity of 283 cubic feet (8.0 m^{3}) per second. A 2003 report noted that there had been silting upstream of the dam but the width of the downstream channels had decreased sharply since the diversion dam was built. The river has cut a deeper channel in its bed and now runs faster. This made it harder for fish to travel upstream. The report suggested that if eight Gradient Restoration Facilities were installed in the downstream reach, that should be enough to slow the water, allowing sediment to settle and making fish passage easier. A 2005 report considered removing the dam altogether. Again, it suggested emplacement of Gradient Restoration Facilities to control erosion as sediment above and below the dam returned to normal levels.

== Education ==
It is within Socorro Consolidated Schools. Socorro High School is the comprehensive high school of the district.
