= Isleta Diversion Dam =

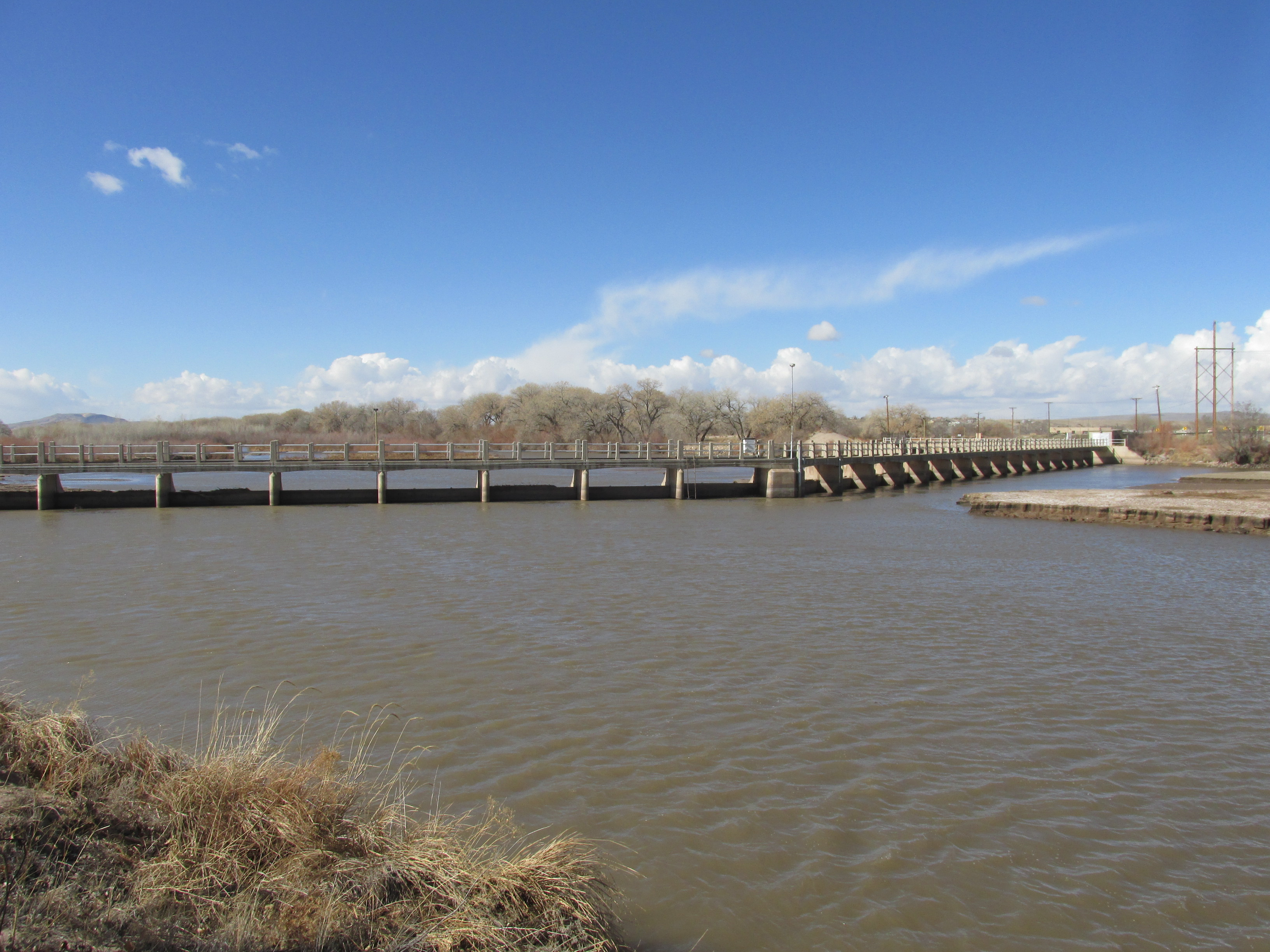
- Isleta Diversion Dam

- Location within New Mexico
- Country: United States
- Location: Valencia / Bernalillo counties, near Isleta, New Mexico
- Coordinates: 34.9057°N 106.6851°W
- Purpose: Irrigation
- Opening date: 1934
- Owner: Middle Rio Grande Conservancy District

Dam and spillways
- Type of dam: Diversion dam
- Height: 21 feet (6.4 m)
- Length: 674 feet (205 m)
- Spillway capacity: 1,070 cubic feet (30 m^{3}) per second

The Isleta Diversion Dam is a structure on the Rio Grande in the Albuquerque Basin near Isleta Village Proper, New Mexico, United States, that diverts water from the river into irrigation canals. There have been some negative environmental impacts due to changes in the river flow that affect the native fish and drying of the riverside land.

== Structure ==
The Isleta Diversion Dam is one of three diversion dams maintained by the Middle Rio Grande Conservancy District (MRGCD), the others being the Angostura Diversion Dam and the San Acacia Diversion Dam. The Isleta Diversion Dam serves the MRGCD's Belen Division. It is a reinforced concrete structure, 21 feet (6.4 m) high and 674 feet (205 m) long with 30 radial gates. It has a total diversion capacity of 1,070 cubic feet (30 m^{3}) per second, feeding the Peralta Main and Belen Highline Canals.

The dam was completed in 1934. In 1955 the dam was rehabilitated by the United States Bureau of Reclamation as part of the Middle Rio Grande Project.

== Diversion potential ==
River volumes peak between March and June due to the spring runoff, but demand for irrigation peaks between July and October. During the irrigation period, the river downstream from the Isleta diversion dam may largely dry up unless irrigation water is returned to the river or a summer storm provides a brief influx of water. Potentially, the dam can divert all the water out of the Rio Grande in low-flow conditions. Between 2001 and 2005, the dam diverted 58% of upstream water in wet years and 91% in dry years, although the total volume diverted in wet years was higher.

== Environmental impact ==
The dam has helped to reduce flooding and to provide irrigation water, but has had some negative environmental impact. Upstream from the dam the river has silted, but islands have formed downstream, with the river cutting relatively deep and narrow channels with faster-moving water. This has caused a problem for fish such as the Rio Grande silvery minnow. This fish used to be one of the most common fish in the river. The diversion dams have cut its habitat into four separate segments. It is now classified as endangered and its population continues to decline.

Improved drainage has dried out the wetlands, harming native plants and wildlife. The frequency of wildfires has increased. In response, the Isleta Pueblo and consultants have been developing a plan to reduce the risk of fire, prioritize fire fighting to focus on areas dominated by native vegetation, replant cottonwood and willows along the banks, restore riparian grasslands and search for ways to better manage the dam.
