= Isleta Village Proper, New Mexico =

- Census-designated place
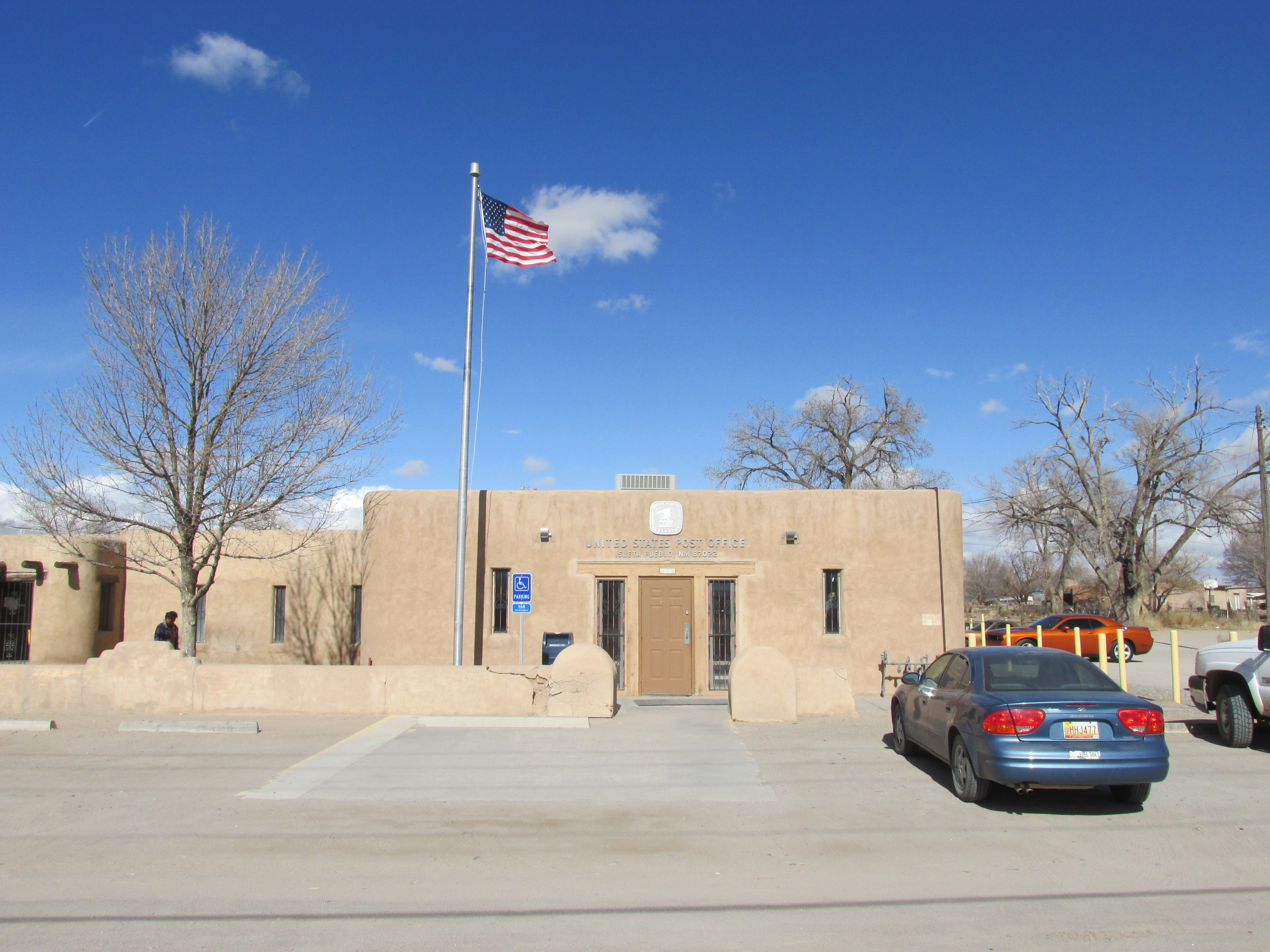
- Post Office

- Location of Isleta Village Proper, New Mexico

- Location in the United States
- Coordinates: 34°54′15″N 106°41′56″W
- Country: United States
- State: New Mexico
- County: Bernalillo

Area
  - Total: 0.73 sq mi (1.89 km^{2})
  - Land: 0.73 sq mi (1.89 km^{2})
  - Water: 0 sq mi (0.00 km^{2})
- Elevation: 4,902 ft (1,494 m)

Population (2020)
  - Total: 802
  - Density: 1,097.6/sq mi (423.78/km^{2})
- Time zone: UTC-7 (Mountain (MST))
  - Summer (DST): UTC-6 (MDT)
- Area code: 505
- FIPS code: 35-34760
- GNIS feature ID: 1852627

Isleta Village Proper or Isleta is a census-designated place (CDP) in Bernalillo County, New Mexico, United States. The population was 491 at the 2010 census. It is part of the Albuquerque Metropolitan Statistical Area.

== Geography ==
According to the United States Census Bureau, the CDP has a total area of 0.27 square miles (0.7 km^{2}), all land.

The village lies in the Rio Grande Valley of the Albuquerque Basin on the west bank of the Rio Grande. When the river is low, the nearby Isleta Diversion Dam and the downstream San Acacia Diversion Dam, both managed by the Middle Rio Grande Conservancy District, can divert all water from the Rio Grande along a 110-mile (177 km) stretch of the river.

== Demographics ==
Historical population
Census	Pop.	Note	%±
2020	802		—
U.S. Decennial Census

As of the census of 2000, there were 496 people, 190 households, and 125 families residing in the CDP. The population density was 1,839.4 inhabitants per square mile (710.2/km^{2}). There were 278 housing units at an average density of 1,031.0 per square mile (398.1/km^{2}). The racial makeup of the CDP was 0.60% White, 97.98% Native American, 0.40% Asian, 0.40% from other races, and 0.60% from two or more races. Hispanic or Latino of any race were 4.23% of the population.

There were 190 households, out of which 31.6% had children under the age of 18 living with them, 30.0% were married couples living together, 26.3% had a female householder with no husband present, and 34.2% were non-families. 30.5% of all households were made up of individuals, and 16.3% had someone living alone who was 65 years of age or older. The average household size was 2.61 and the average family size was 3.26.

In the CDP, the population was spread out, with 27.4% under the age of 18, 10.9% from 18 to 24, 24.6% from 25 to 44, 18.8% from 45 to 64, and 18.3% who were 65 years of age or older. The median age was 38 years. For every 100 females, there were 92.2 males. For every 100 females age 18 and over, there were 76.5 males.

The median income for a household in the CDP was $20,268, and the median income for a family was $20,000. Males had a median income of $25,000 versus $31,538 for females. The per capita income for the CDP was $9,804. About 36.2% of families and 38.5% of the population were below the poverty line, including 53.0% of those under age 18 and 45.7% of those age 65 or over.

== Education ==
It is zoned to Albuquerque Public Schools.

The Bureau of Indian Education operates Isleta Elementary School in an unincorporated area west of the CDP. The current facility opened in 2006.

The public library is the Isleta Pueblo Library.

== In media ==
In 1912, D. W. Griffith made the film "A Pueblo Legend", starring Mary Pickford at Isleta Pueblo.

== See also ==
- List of census-designated places in New Mexico
