= Heron Dam =

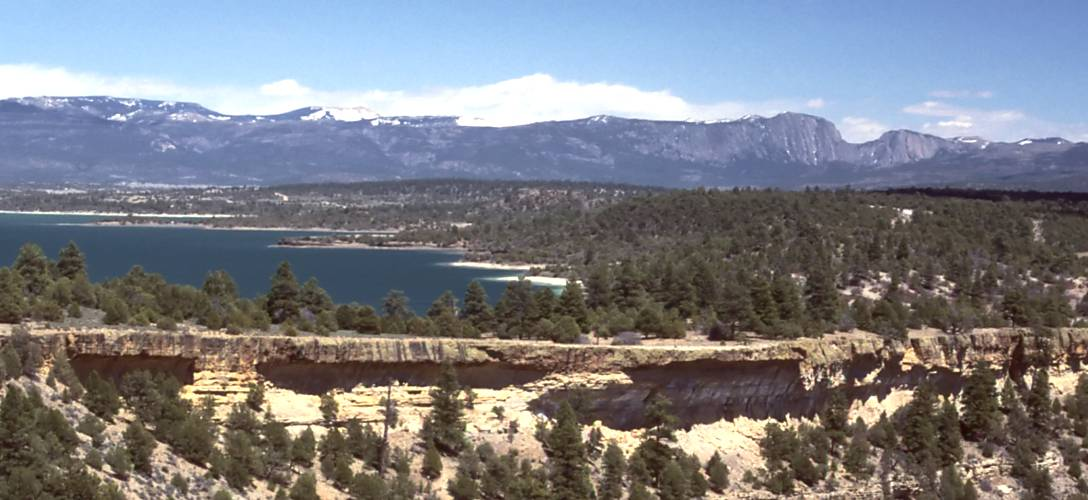
- The Brazos Cliffs, Heron Lake, and the north wall of the Rio Chama Gorge, looking east.

- Location within New Mexico
- Country: United States
- Location: Rio Arriba County, New Mexico
- Coordinates: 36.665915°N 106.706226°W
- Purpose: Irrigation
- Opening date: 1971
- Owner: United States Bureau of Reclamation

Dam and spillways
- Type of dam: Storage dam
- Height: 263 feet (80 m)
- Length: 1,250 feet (380 m)

Reservoir
- Total capacity: 401,000 acre-feet (495,000,000 m^{3})

Heron Dam is a storage dam Rio Arriba County, in northern New Mexico in the southwestern United States, just north of the El Vado Dam. It is owned and operated by the United States Bureau of Reclamation. The dam is about 9 miles west of the town of Tierra Amarilla and is crossed by New Mexico State Road 95.

== Construction ==
The dam was built as part of the San Juan–Chama Project, which transfers water from the San Juan River basin through the 12.8 miles (20.6 km) Azotea Tunnel under the Continental Divide into Willow Creek, where it is stored in Heron Reservoir as part of the Colorado River Storage Project. The dam is located on Willow Creek near the creek's confluence with the Rio Chama. Construction was completed in 1971. The outlet works at El Vado Dam, just downstream from Heron Dam, were enlarged as part of the San Juan-Chama Project so releases from Heron Reservoir could pass unimpeded through the dam. The capacity of the El Vado outlet works was increased to pass 6,600 cubic feet (190 m^{3}) per second.

== Structure ==
The reservoir lies at an elevation of 7,192 feet (2,192 m) above sea level. The earthfill dam is 1,221 feet (372 m) long and 276 feet (84 m) high. Heron Dike, one mile northwest of the dam, helps contain the reservoir. It has a concrete crest spillway with an open chute with a discharge capacity of 600 cubic feet (17 m^{3}) per second. The dam's outlet works include an intake structure, 10 feet (3.0 m) diameter concrete-lined upstream tunnel, gate chamber, 11 feet (3.4 m) modified horseshoe concrete-lined downstream tunnel, and a stilling basin. The discharge capacity is 4,160 cubic feet (118 m^{3}) per second at a reservoir elevation of 7,190.8 feet (2,191.8 m).

When filled, the reservoir covers 5,905 acres (23.90 km^{2}). The maximum safe storage capacity is 401,000 acre-feet (495,000,000 m^{3}). Downstream channel capacity is about 6,000 cubic feet (170 m^{3}) per second.

== Operations ==
The dam was built strictly for storage and delivery of San Juan-Chama Project water for municipal, domestic, industrial, recreation, irrigation, and fish and wildlife purposes. The water is diverted to New Mexico as agreed under the Colorado River and Upper Colorado River Compacts. The amount of water diverted each year, and the way in which it is used, are subject to well-defined agreements. Flows of "native" or "natural" water from Willow Creek and from the Rio Chama upstream of the dam are measured and bypassed through the reservoir.

The dam provides up to 5,000 acre-feet (6,200,000 m^{3}) of San Juan-Chama water annually to maintain the recreation pool at Cochiti Reservoir. The dam can supply about 96,200 acre-feet (118,700,000 m^{3}) of San Juan-Chama water annually to users with reasonable certainty. There is no carry-over provision: contractors must take delivery of their water by December 31. This means that contractors such as the City of Albuquerque or the Middle Rio Grande Conservancy District often withdraw their water and arrange to store it in downstream reservoirs such as El Vado, Abiquiu, Jemez Canyon (by exchange), and Elephant Butte.
