= El Vado Dam =

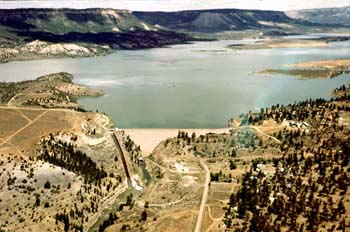

- Location of El Vado Dam in New Mexico
- Country: United States
- Location: Rio Arriba County, New Mexico
- Coordinates: 36°35′41″N 106°43′58″W
- Owner: U.S. Bureau of Reclamation

Dam and spillways
- Type of dam: Earthfill
- Impounds: Rio Chama
- Height: 229.5 ft (70.0 m)
- Length: 1,326 ft (404 m)
- Dam volume: 608,000 yd^{3} (465,000 m^{3})
- Spillways: 2x
- Spillway type: Concrete overflow, service
- Spillway capacity: 17,800 cu ft/s (500 m^{3}/s)

Reservoir
- Creates: El Vado Lake
- Total capacity: 196,500 acre⋅ft (242,400,000 m^{3})
- Catchment area: 492 mi^{2} (1,270 km^{2})
- Surface area: 3,200 acres (1,300 ha)
- Maximum water depth: 167.1 ft (50.9 m)

Power Station
- Installed capacity: 8 MW

El Vado Dam impounds the Rio Chama in the U.S. state of New Mexico, about 105 miles (169 km) north-northwest of New Mexico's largest city, Albuquerque and about 80 miles (130 km) northwest of the capital city of Santa Fe. The steel-faced, earth-filled structure forms El Vado Lake, a storage reservoir for the Middle Rio Grande Project, and has been designated as a New Mexico Historic Civil Engineering Landmark by the American Society of Civil Engineers.

== Construction ==
The El Vado dam was built by the Middle Rio Grande Conservancy District to create a storage facility for irrigation water to be used in the Middle Rio Grande Basin. Construction began in 1933 and the dam was completed in 1935. Impoundment of the reservoir, which filled by 1936, inundated El Vado, the largest town of Rio Arriba County. The town's name meant "the crossing" in Spanish, and it was named so because it was an important ford and trading center on the Rio Chama during the 19th century.

The dam was rehabilitated by the Bureau of Reclamation in 1954-1955. In the 1960s and 1970s, the San Juan–Chama Project built a diversion through a tunnel from the San Juan River basin to the Rio Chama, requiring an extensive retrofit of the dam's water conveyance facilities. The outlet works at El Vado Dam were enlarged between 1965 and 1966 so that releases from the Heron Dam could pass unimpeded through the dam. The capacity of the El Vado outlet works was increased to pass 6,600 cubic feet (190 m^{3}) per second.

== Structure ==
The El Vado dam is 229.5 feet (70.0 m) high and 1,326 feet (404 m) long, and holds 196,500 acre-feet (242,400,000 m^{3}) of water. It has a concrete lined spillway capable of discharging 17,800 cubic feet per second (500 m^{3}/s) of water. The dam also has a set of outlet works, capable of carrying 6,850 cubic feet per second (194 m^{3}/s).

Unlike most dams, El Vado Dam has a faceplate made of steel instead of concrete or rock. The dam has been leaking for decades as water has been seeping through the faceplate, undermining the dam's foundation.

== Usage ==
Owned by the United States Bureau of Reclamation, the El Vado dam serves for storage and flood-control purposes. It incorporates an 8 megawatt power generation facility owned by the Incorporated County of Los Alamos Department of Public Utilities. El Vado Lake, the reservoir formed by the dam, has 3,200 acres (1,300 ha) and is surrounded by El Vado Lake State Park. The lake is a popular location for swimming, fishing and recreational boating.

== Climate ==
Climate data for El Vado Dam, New Mexico, 1991–2020 normals, 1906-2020 extremes: 6740ft (2054m)
Month	Jan	Feb	Mar	Apr	May	Jun	Jul	Aug	Sep	Oct	Nov	Dec	Year
Record high °F (°C)	64 (18)	67 (19)	85 (29)	84 (29)	93 (34)	101 (38)	102 (39)	98 (37)	95 (35)	90 (32)	79 (26)	70 (21)	102 (39)
Mean maximum °F (°C)	53.1 (11.7)	57.2 (14.0)	67.4 (19.7)	74.0 (23.3)	82.8 (28.2)	91.5 (33.1)	94.4 (34.7)	91.1 (32.8)	87.4 (30.8)	78.1 (25.6)	66.7 (19.3)	55.7 (13.2)	95.2 (35.1)
Mean daily maximum °F (°C)	39.7 (4.3)	43.4 (6.3)	52.1 (11.2)	59.3 (15.2)	69.4 (20.8)	80.4 (26.9)	84.6 (29.2)	81.6 (27.6)	75.5 (24.2)	64.0 (17.8)	50.8 (10.4)	40.2 (4.6)	61.8 (16.5)
Daily mean °F (°C)	24.2 (−4.3)	28.8 (−1.8)	36.3 (2.4)	42.4 (5.8)	51.0 (10.6)	60.3 (15.7)	66.7 (19.3)	64.7 (18.2)	57.1 (13.9)	45.8 (7.7)	34.4 (1.3)	25.3 (−3.7)	44.8 (7.1)
Mean daily minimum °F (°C)	8.6 (−13.0)	14.3 (−9.8)	20.5 (−6.4)	25.4 (−3.7)	32.6 (0.3)	40.1 (4.5)	48.8 (9.3)	47.9 (8.8)	38.7 (3.7)	27.6 (−2.4)	17.9 (−7.8)	10.3 (−12.1)	27.7 (−2.4)
Mean minimum °F (°C)	−9.1 (−22.8)	−4.6 (−20.3)	6.0 (−14.4)	12.9 (−10.6)	21.2 (−6.0)	29.1 (−1.6)	39.5 (4.2)	38.9 (3.8)	26.4 (−3.1)	15.2 (−9.3)	4.1 (−15.5)	−6.1 (−21.2)	−12.5 (−24.7)
Record low °F (°C)	−45 (−43)	−35 (−37)	−19 (−28)	4 (−16)	10 (−12)	20 (−7)	30 (−1)	29 (−2)	17 (−8)	4 (−16)	−24 (−31)	−37 (−38)	−45 (−43)
Average precipitation inches (mm)	0.86 (22)	0.88 (22)	0.80 (20)	1.08 (27)	1.04 (26)	0.70 (18)	1.84 (47)	2.16 (55)	1.67 (42)	1.33 (34)	0.83 (21)	0.94 (24)	14.13 (358)
Average snowfall inches (cm)	10.40 (26.4)	7.30 (18.5)	2.20 (5.6)	2.20 (5.6)	0.00 (0.00)	0.00 (0.00)	0.00 (0.00)	0.00 (0.00)	0.00 (0.00)	0.70 (1.8)	3.30 (8.4)	9.60 (24.4)	35.7 (90.7)
Source 1: NOAA
Source 2: XMACIS2 (records & monthly max/mins)
