= Middle Rio Grande Project =

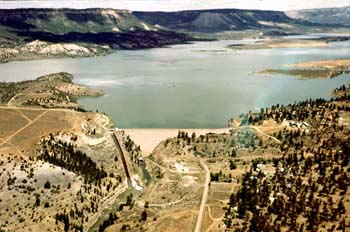
- El Vado Dam

General statistics
- Begun: 1950
- Storage dams: El Vado Dam; Cochiti Dam
- Diversion dams: Angostura Diversion Dam; Isleta Diversion Dam; San Acacia Diversion Dam

Operations
- Authorities: United States Bureau of Reclamation – United States Army Corps of Engineers – Middle Rio Grande Conservancy District
- Land irrigated: 89,652 acres (36,281 ha)

The Middle Rio Grande Project manages water in the Albuquerque Basin of New Mexico, United States. It includes major upgrades and extensions to the irrigation facilities built by the Middle Rio Grande Conservancy District and modifications to the channel of the Rio Grande to control sedimentation and flooding. The bulk of the work was done by the United States Bureau of Reclamation and the United States Army Corps of Engineers in the 1950s, but construction continued into the 1970s and maintenance is ongoing. The project is complementary to the San Juan–Chama Project, which transfers water from the San Juan River in the Colorado River Basin to the Rio Grande. Although distribution of water from the two projects is handled through separate allotments and contracts, there is some sharing of facilities including the river itself. The ecological impact on the river and the riparian zone was the subject of extended litigation after a group of environmentalists filed Rio Grande Silvery Minnow v. Bureau of Reclamation in 1999.

== Background ==
The Rio Grande valley from Taos Pueblo downstream to Socorro has been continuously settled for longer than any other part of the United States. The Pueblo Indians diverted water from the river for irrigation. Spanish settlers who arrived in the 17th century established a more extensive system of acequias, or shared irrigation canals. More settlers arrived after the region was ceded to the United States in 1848, particularly after the American Civil War (1861-1865). Irrigation peaked in 1880 with 1,248,000 acres (505,000 ha) of cultivated land in the stretch of valley from Cochiti to San Marcial. The extent of cultivation began to decline after this due to water shortage, floods and waterlogging caused by aggradation of the riverbed, a rising water table and poor drainage.

The Middle Rio Grande Conservancy District was established in 1925 to address these problems. It ran into financial difficulties and asked the Bureau of Reclamation to help investigate the problems and rehabilitation the irrigation facilities. The Flood Control Act of 30 June 1948 approved the comprehensive plan for the project, and also directed the Bureau of Reclamation to look into methods of reducing non-beneficial use of water by phreatic vegetation in the Rio Grande flood plains and its main tributaries above Caballo Reservoir. The Bureau of Reclamation and the Corps of Engineers worked together to plan the project. The Flood Control Act of 17 May 1950 approved completion of the plan. The Bureau of Reclamation was responsible for rehabilitating the El Vado dam, the irrigation and drainage works and the river channel. The Corps of Engineers was responsible for building flood control reservoirs and flood protection levees.

== Overview ==
Rio Grande basin, showing dams and diversions. Middle Rio Grande Project is in the northwest.

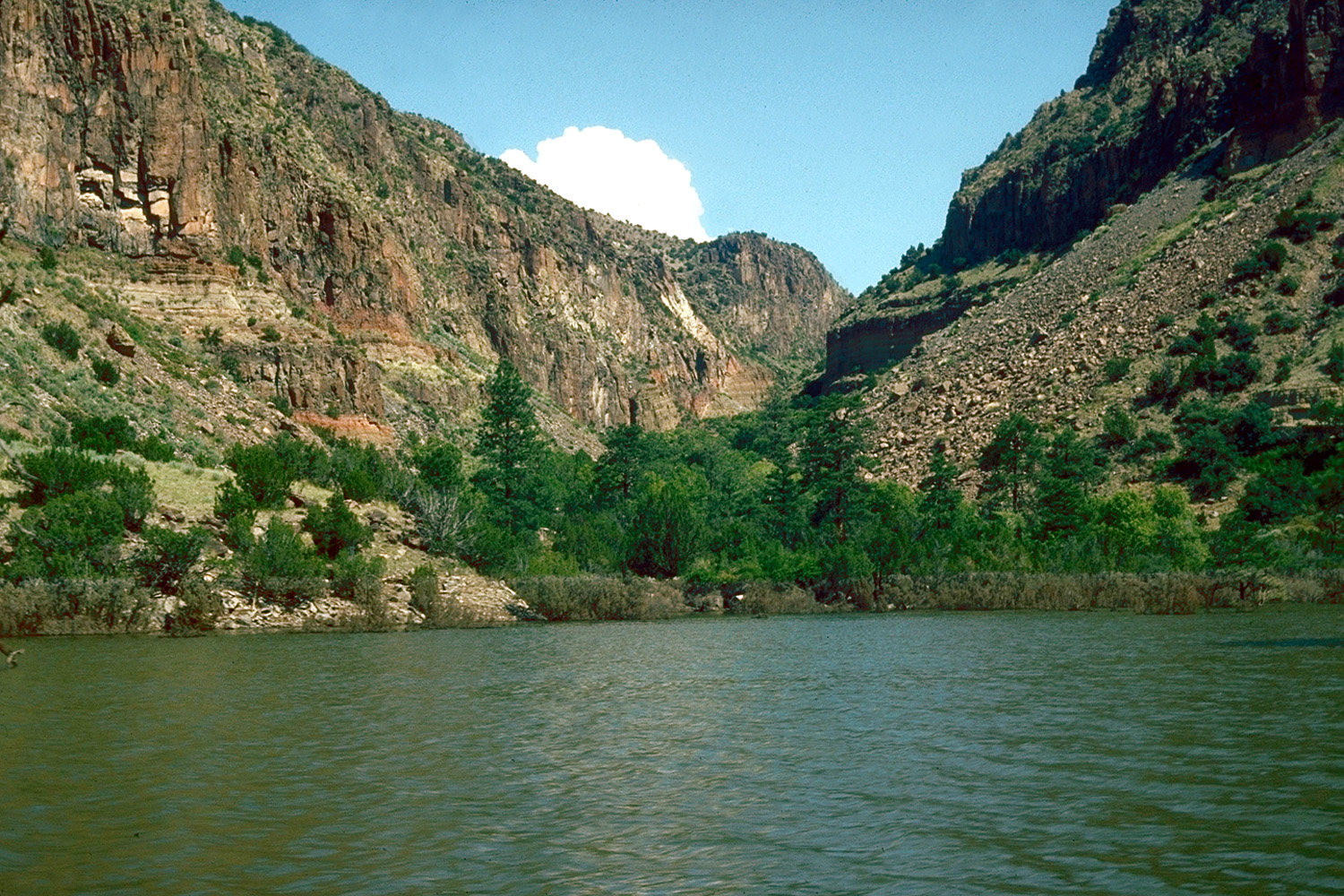
Cochiti reservoir

The Middle Rio Grande Project includes the river, dams, irrigation and drainage channels from Velarde south to the point where the river enters the Elephant Butte Reservoir. It also includes maintenance of the river near Truth or Consequences, New Mexico. The irrigation facilities, originally built by the conservancy district, irrigate up to 89,652 acres (36,281 ha), and include 30,000 acres (12,000 ha) of Indian water rights lands. The Bureau of Reclamation operates and maintains El Vado Dam and the river from Velarde to the Narrows of Elephant Butte Reservoir. The Middle Rio Grande Conservancy District operates the irrigation facilities, including the three diversion dams. The Corps of Engineers operates and maintains Cochiti Dam.

== Construction ==
=== Storage ===
In 1934-1935 the conservancy district built the El Vado Dam on the Rio Chama about 160 miles (260 km) north of Albuquerque to store irrigation water for use in dry periods. In 1954-1955 the Bureau of Reclamation rehabilitated the dam, a rolled-gravel embankment with a steel membrane on the upstream face, 230 feet (70 m) high with a crest length of 1,326 feet (404 m). In 1965-1968 the Bureau of Reclamation built a new outlet works to handle additional water delivered by the San Juan–Chama Project. The reservoir has a capacity of 196,500 acre-feet (one acre foot equaling 43,560 cubic feet (1,233 m^{3})). The dam feeds an 8,000 kilowatt hydroelectric power plant operated by Los Alamos County.

In 1974-1975 the Cochiti Dam was constructed by the Corps of Engineers for flood control, inundating the former Cochiti Diversion Dam. It also provides irrigation water to the Cochiti Division.

=== Diversions ===
The Bureau of Reclamation rehabilitated four diversion dams. Angostura Diversion Dam, rehabilitated in 1958, serves the Albuquerque Division. It is a concrete weir section 17 feet (5.2 m) high and 800 feet (240 m) long. Isleta Diversion Dam, rehabilitated in 1955, serves the Belen Division. It is a reinforced concrete structure 21 feet (6.4 m) high and 674 feet (205 m) long with 30 radial gates. San Acacia Diversion Dam, rehabilitated in 1957, serves the Socorro Division. It is 17 feet (5.2 m) high and 700 feet (210 m) long, with 29 radial gates. The Cochiti Division was formerly served by the Cochiti Diversion Dam, rehabilitated in 1958, but is now supplied directly from Cochiti Dam.

=== Irrigation and drainage ===
The distribution and drainage system includes 202 miles (325 km) of canals, of which about 6 miles (9.7 km) are concrete lined; 580 miles (930 km) of laterals, of which about 4 miles (6.4 km) are concrete lined; and 405 miles (652 km) of open and concrete pipe drains, most of which are open section. From 1953 to 1961 the Bureau of Reclamation undertook extensive rehabilitation of canals, laterals, drains, and acequias throughout the project. In 1951 the Bureau of Reclamation began construction of the low-flow conveyance channel between San Acacia Diversion Dam and the Narrows of Elephant Butte, completing the job in 1959. In 1961 the Bureau of Reclamation completed modification of the headworks for the Socorro Main Canal north at San Acacia Diversion Dam. In 1975 the canal was tied into Drain Unit No. 7 Extension and then to Drain Unit No. 7 system.

=== River ===
Between 1954 and 1962 the Bureau of Reclamation undertook river realignment and improvement between Velarde and the mouth of the Rio Puerco. Maintenance along a 149-mile (240 km) stretch of the river to control floods and reduce non-beneficial use of water through evapotranspiration is an ongoing requirement. The lengths of river maintained are 18 miles (29 km) in the Espanola area, 8 miles (13 km) in the Cochiti area, 24 miles (39 km) in the Albuquerque area, 28 miles (45 km) in the Belen area, 37 miles (60 km) in the Socorro area, 33 miles (53 km) in the San Marcial area and 1 mile (1.6 km) in the Truth or Consequences areas. Maintenance activities include clearing sediment plugs, pilot channeling, jetty installation, and maintaining the low-flow channel. The Bureau of Reclamation has been using alternative methods of channel maintenance since the late 1980s in an effort to improve the quality of the riverine and riparian habitats.

== Benefits ==
Rehabilitation of the irrigation system throughout the project has resulted in a more stable water supply to about 90,000 acres (36,000 ha) of irrigated land, including water for the six southern Indian pueblos of Cochiti, Santo Domingo, San Felipe, Santa Ana, Sandia, and Isleta, all of which are served by the Middle Rio Grande Conservancy District. This supports cultivation of alfalfa, barley, wheat, oats, corn, fruits and vegetables. The river maintenance program, coupled with the Corps of Engineers' flood control dams and system of levees, has greatly reduced the threat of uncontrolled flooding in the Middle Rio Grande Valley.

== Issues ==
Stabilization of the river channel through clearing, pilot channels, and jetty fields has resulted in the establishment of large wooded riparian areas called the bosque. Previously, large stands of trees were destroyed during heavy runoff years because the river meandered back and forth across the channel from levee to levee. The areas between the cleared floodway and the riverside levees are now filled with a permanent stand of large trees and other dense growths of vegetation. The invasion of nonnative species, as well as the lack of native tree regeneration, is of environmental concern.

== See also ==
- Rio Grande dams and diversions
