= Angostura Diversion Dam =

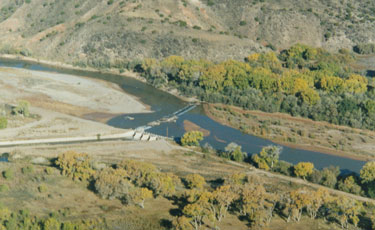
- Angostura Diversion Dam

- Location within New Mexico
- Location: Sandoval County, New Mexico
- Coordinates: 35.379881°N 106.499032°W
- Owner: Middle Rio Grande Conservancy District

Dam and spillways
- Type of dam: Diversion dam
- Height: 17 feet (5.2 m)
- Length: 800 feet (240 m)
- Elevation at crest: 5,083 feet (1,549 m)
- Spillway capacity: 650 cubic feet (18 m^{3}) per second

The Angostura Diversion Dam is a diversion dam on the Rio Grande in Sandoval County, New Mexico, near Algodones and to the north of Bernalillo. The dam diverts water into the main irrigation canal serving the Albuquerque Division.

The Angostura Diversion Dam consists of a concrete weir section 17 feet (5.2 m) high and 800 feet (240 m) long. The dam was built in 1934 by the Middle Rio Grande Conservancy District (MRGCD), and in 1958 was rehabilitated by the United States Bureau of Reclamation and the Corps of Engineers as part of the Middle Rio Grande Project. It has a diversion capacity of 650 cubic feet (18 m^{3}) per second. Four 20 by 4 feet (6.1 by 1.2 m) top-seal radial gates supply water to the Albuquerque Main Canal. The MRGCD is responsible for operations and maintenance.
