= High (tectonics) =

Area where tectonic uplift has taken place

In academic structural geology and tectonics , a high is a general descriptive term for any region of positive structural relief. USGS usage tends to emphasize fault-bounded uplifted blocks in extensional systems such as the Basin and Range Province.

Highs are often bounded by normal faults and can be regarded as the opposites of basins. A related word is a massif, an area where relative old rocks layers are found at the surface. A small high can be called a horst.

Because of the relative uplift the accommodation space for sediments was relatively small and a high will have thinner sedimentary layers deposited on it compared to the surrounding basins. Therefore, highs are not good places to study stratigraphic sequences as the sequence may be less detailed or even absent.

== See also ==
- Anteclise
