= Albuquerque Basin =

Basin and ecoregion within the Rio Grande rift in central New Mexico, US

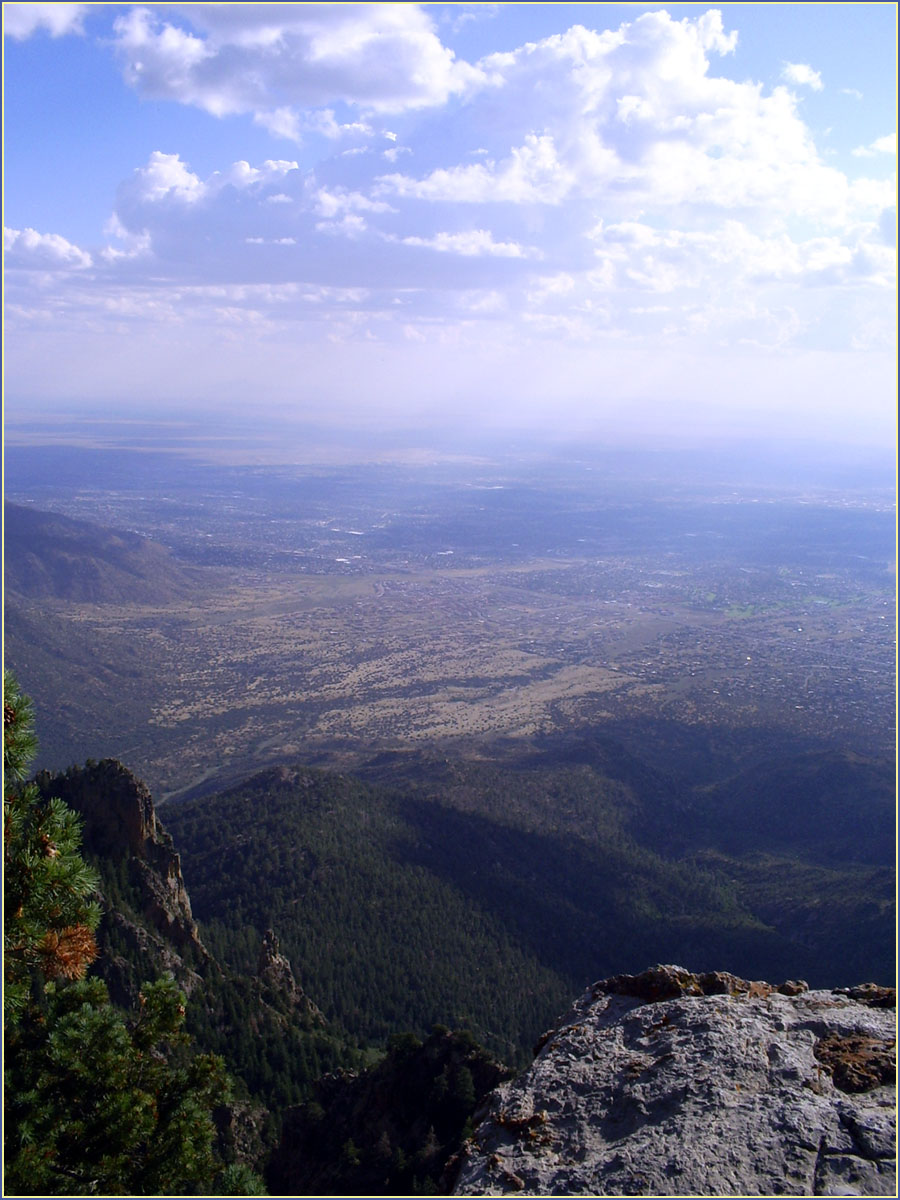
- View of the Albuquerque Basin from Sandia Peak
- Type: Structural basin
- Unit of: Rio Grande rift

Location
- Coordinates: 35.10°N 106.60°W
- Country: United States
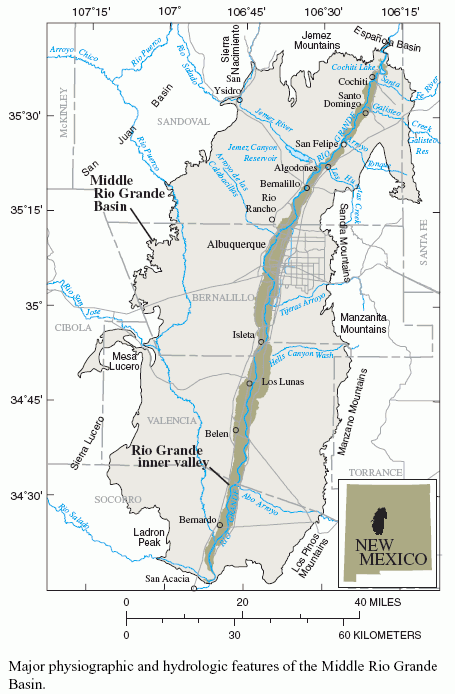

The Albuquerque Basin (or Middle Rio Grande Basin) is a structural basin and ecoregion within the Rio Grande rift in central New Mexico. It contains the city of Albuquerque.

Geologically, the Albuquerque Basin is a half-graben that slopes down towards the east to terminate on the Sandia and Manzano mountains. The basin is the largest and oldest of the three major basins in the Rio Grande rift, containing sediments whose depth ranges from 4,407 to 6,592 meters (14,459 to 21,627 ft).

The basin has a semi-arid climate, with large areas that count as semi-desert. Paleo-Indian traces dating back 12,000 years show that the climate used to be wetter and more fertile than it is today. The Rio Grande flows through the basin from north to south, and its valley has been irrigated for at least 1,000 years. Intense irrigation began in the late nineteenth century with new dams, levees and ditches which have caused environmental problems.

In times of low water levels in the Rio Grande, Albuquerque relies on groundwater for its potable water supply. The aquifer is composed of deposits from the ancestral Rio Grande and the size of its annual recharge follows fluctuations in weather and climate phenomena. There may be natural gas in the basin, but opponents of gas extraction fear the impact on the groundwater and on the quality of life.

== Location ==
Location of the basin in the United States

The Albuquerque Basin covers 8,000 square kilometres (3,100 sq mi) of New Mexico. The basin is bounded by the Sandia and Manzano mountains on the east, the Jemez Mountains to the north, the Rio Puerco on the west and the Socorro Basin to the south. It is 160 kilometres (99 mi) north-south and 86 kilometres (53 mi) east-west at its widest point. The Rio Grande, at an elevation of 1,420 metres (4,660 ft) runs through the basin from north to south. To the east, alluvial fans and stream terraces descend to the river from the mountains that form the eastern boundary of the basin. West of the river the Llano de Albuquerque contains only isolated mountains and volcanoes, sloping gradually up to the Rio Puerco. Throughout the basin, which receives little rainfall, there are sand dunes and dune fields, some vegetated and some active.

The basin is rich in Paleo-Indian sites, most of which are found on terraces or other uplands near to the Rio Grande. Some of the sites date back 12,000 years from the present. During the period of Paleo-Indian occupation the playas (dry lake basins) contained wetlands with more vegetation than in today's dry conditions. Remains of the Folsom people include flaked stone tools, pottery sherds and the bones of bison.

Modern communities in the hydrological basin (Note: The boundaries of the geological basin and the hydrological basin are close but not exactly the same, and different sources disagree on the precise boundaries.) include, from north to south, Cochiti, Santo Domingo, San Felipe, Algodones, Bernalillo, Rio Rancho, Albuquerque, Isleta, Los Lunas, Belen and Bernardo.

== Geology ==
The Albuquerque Basin is the largest and oldest of the three major basins in the Rio Grande rift. The depth of the sediments filling the basin typically ranges from 4,407 to 6,592 meters (14,459 to 21,627 ft). These sediments, assigned to the Santa Fe Group, accumulated in the basin between the middle Miocene and early Pliocene, from fifteen to one million years ago. Alluvial sediment came from the adjacent highlands and fluvial sediments came from southern Colorado and northern New Mexico.

During the Middle to Late Miocene era the Albuquerque and Espanola basins formed one basin, an irregular half-graben tilting west, formed by high-angle faulting on reactivated structures from the Laramide orogeny. The Embudo-Pajarito-La Bajada-San Francisco-Rincon fault system became active at the end of the Miocene. When this happened, the Albuquerque basin reversed its half-graben tilt from west to east, and now slopes down to the base of the newly formed Sandia Mountains. The northern part of the Albuquerque Basin was left with the appearance of a symmetrical basin, and is sometimes regarded as a separate geologic basin (Santo Domingo basin).

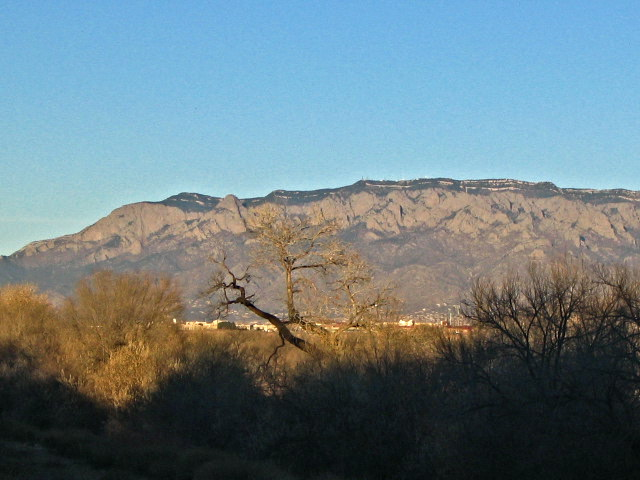
The Sandia Mountains from the Rio Grande bosque in Albuquerque. The basin terminates against this uplifted footwall.

A model of the basin based on seismic reflection data gathered by the oil industry was published in the early 1990s. In this model, the northern part of the basin was an east-tilted half graben, while the southern portion was a west-tilted half graben. A transfer zone running in a southwest direction connected the two. More recently, gravity data has given support for a different model, which is consistent with other sources of information. In this new model, the northern portion is an ENE-facing half-graben, extending further east than had been thought, while the southern portion is an east-facing half graben. The two are connected by a structural high running in a northwest direction. There is a west-tilting area in the southwestern margin of the basin, but it is just 15 to 30 kilometres (9.3 to 18.6 mi) wide.

There were volcanic eruptions throughout the period while the Santa Fe Group sediments were being deposited, and these continued into the late Pleistocene. Most of the resulting basalt and andesite rock is on the west side of the basin. The Albuquerque volcanic field contains volcanoes to the west of the city of Albuquerque that were active as recently as 156,000 years ago. The surface of the basin has extensive wind-blown deposits of sand sheets and dunes from the late Pleistocene and Holocene.

== Ecoregion ==
=== Climate ===
The climate is semi-arid. A large part of the basin is so dry as to be considered a desert. Average annual temperatures are around 13 °C (55 °F), ranging from an average of about 1 °C (34 °F) in January to about 24 °C (75 °F) in July. Average annual rainfall ranges from 190 millimetres (7.5 in) at Belen to 760 millimetres (30 in) at Sandia Crest. Precipitation comes from local thunderstorms in summer and from storm fronts in winter. The amount of rain that falls in a given year or place in the basin is unpredictable. Droughts lasting several years are not unusual. Throughout the basin, potential evapotranspiration is much higher than rainfall, meaning the ground is dry most of the time unless it is irrigated. Vegetation includes desert scrub and grassland in the lower levels, riparian woodland (bosque) along the Rio Grande, and woods on the mountain slopes.

=== Surface water ===
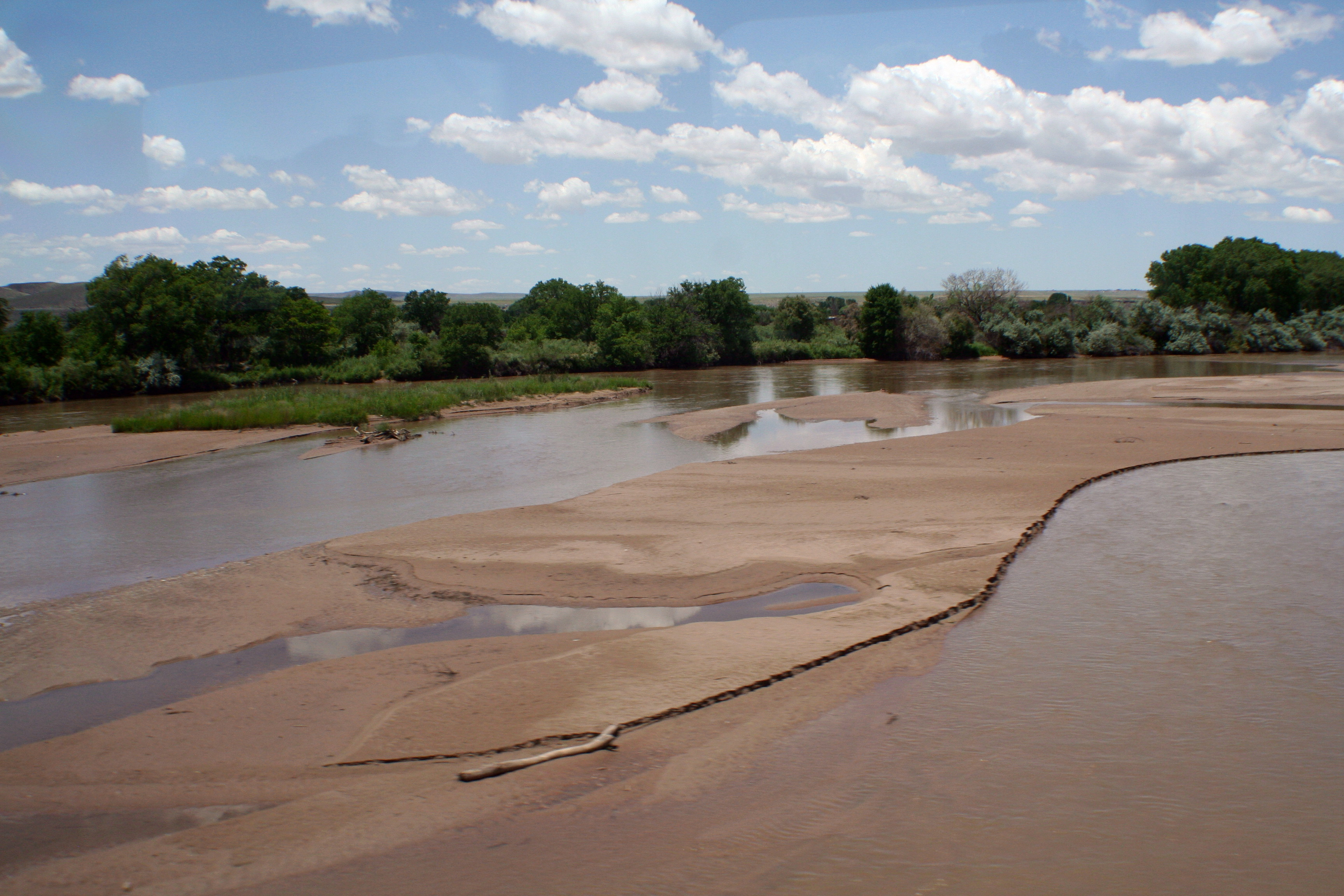
Rio Grande near Isleta

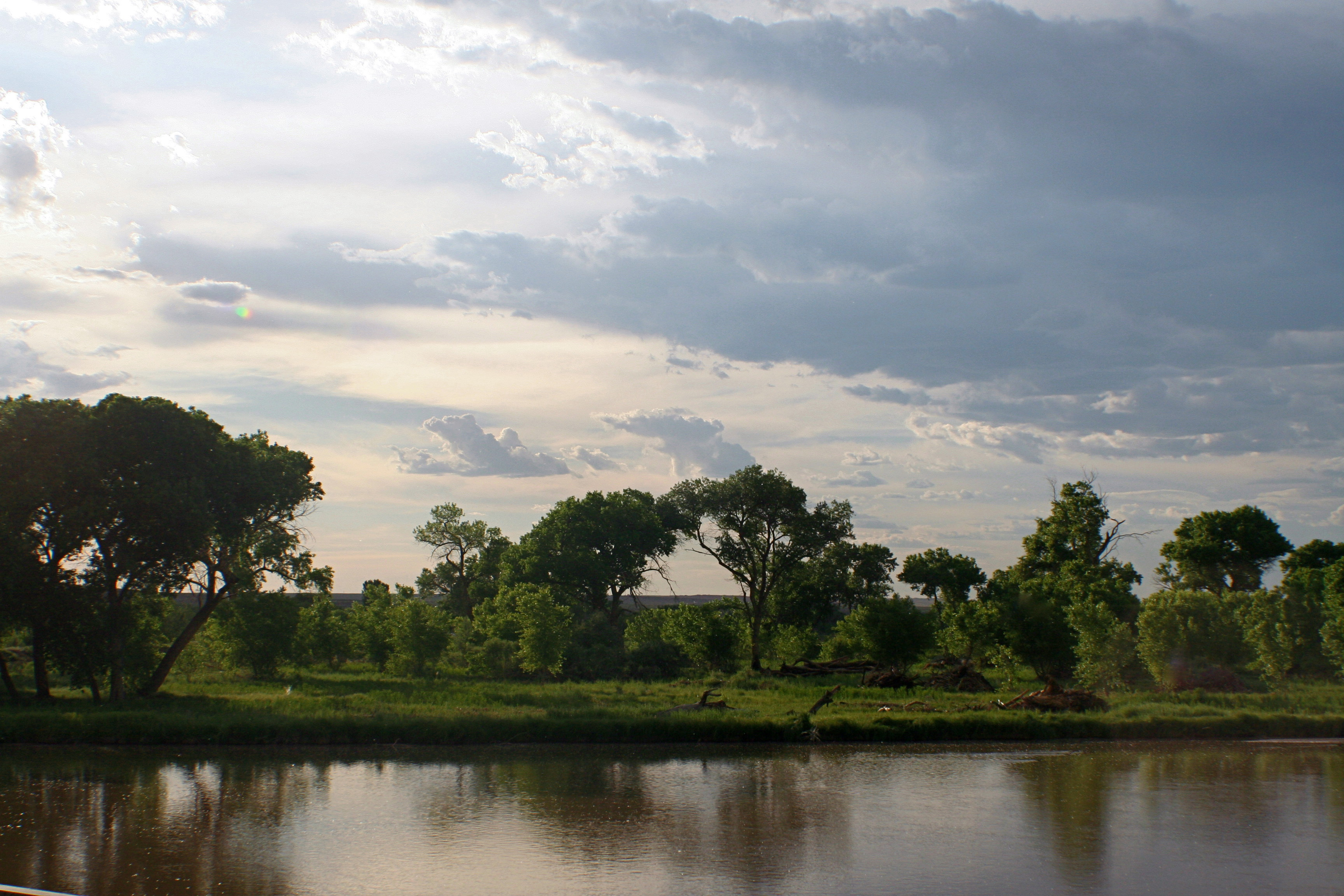
Rio Grande and Bosque near Albuquerque

The Rio Grande, which flows from southwestern Colorado for 2,000 kilometres (1,200 mi) before entering the Gulf of Mexico, was classified in 1993 as one of North America's most endangered or imperiled rivers. The Rio Grande flows south into the Albuquerque Basin between the Sandia and Jemez mountains.

The Pueblo people of the Rio Grande Valley had developed irrigation systems by the 10th century AD, and by the 13th century most of the major pueblos had been established. The Pueblo system of irrigation ditches is one of the oldest of the irrigation systems in North America. The Spanish arrived in Santa Fe de Nuevo México in the 16th-17th centuries, and steadily expanded their presence, Albuquerque was founded as a trading and military outpost in 1706. The Hispanos of New Mexico used them as the backbone of the Pueblo and Hispano acequia (shared irrigation ditch) into which water was diverted from the river, with secondary ditches leading off the main channel named for specific families. Maintenance of the main acequia would be a community responsibility.

Before entering the basin the river is impounded by the Cochiti Dam, built in 1975. After leaving the basin via Socorro, the river is impounded by the Elephant Butte Reservoir, built in 1916. Within the stretch between these dams, the river passes three mainstream structures that divert water into 1,280 kilometres (800 mi) of levees, canals and drains in the section between Algodones and the Bosque del Apache National Wildlife Refuge. When the river is low, the diversion dams at Isleta and San Acacia can divert all water from the Rio Grande along a 177 kilometres (110 mi) stretch of the river. Tributaries include the Jemez River and Rio Puerco from the west, and the Santa Fe River and Galisteo Creek from the east.

In 1848 Mexico ceded the territory to the United States. Railways arrived in 1880, bringing Anglo settlers. The federal government encouraged more irrigation, which probably peaked in the early 1890s. The newcomers developed the vineyards, orchards and vegetable farms, and by 1900 were exporting produce as far as California. Over-exploitation caused a steady decline in irrigation due to "droughts, sedimentation, aggradation of the main channel, salinization, seepage and waterlogging". The acequia running through the city of Albuquerque, parallel to the river, became an unsanitary drainage ditch, serving as a common sewer.

In 1925 the Middle Rio Grande Conservancy District (MRGCD) was formed. It built a levee to reduce the impact of Rio Grande floods, drained the swampy land and improved the acequias. During and since World War II, the city of Albuquerque has grown steadily. The MSGCD still maintains a large network of canals and irrigation systems that stretches from 30 miles (48 km) north of Albuquerque through the city down to the Bosque del Apache National Wildlife Refuge. As of 2012 the MRGCD was responsible for an area of 278,000 acres (113,000 ha), of which 128,787 acres (52,118 ha) could be irrigated and 70,000 acres (28,000 ha) were in fact being irrigated by 11,000 farmers. The MRGCD was maintaining four diversion dams and reservoirs, 834 miles (1,342 km) of canals and ditches and 404 miles (650 km) of riverside drains. With growing urbanization, the role of the MRGCD has gradually shifted from supporting agriculture to preserving the riverside ecology and helping to recharge the Albuquerque aquifer.

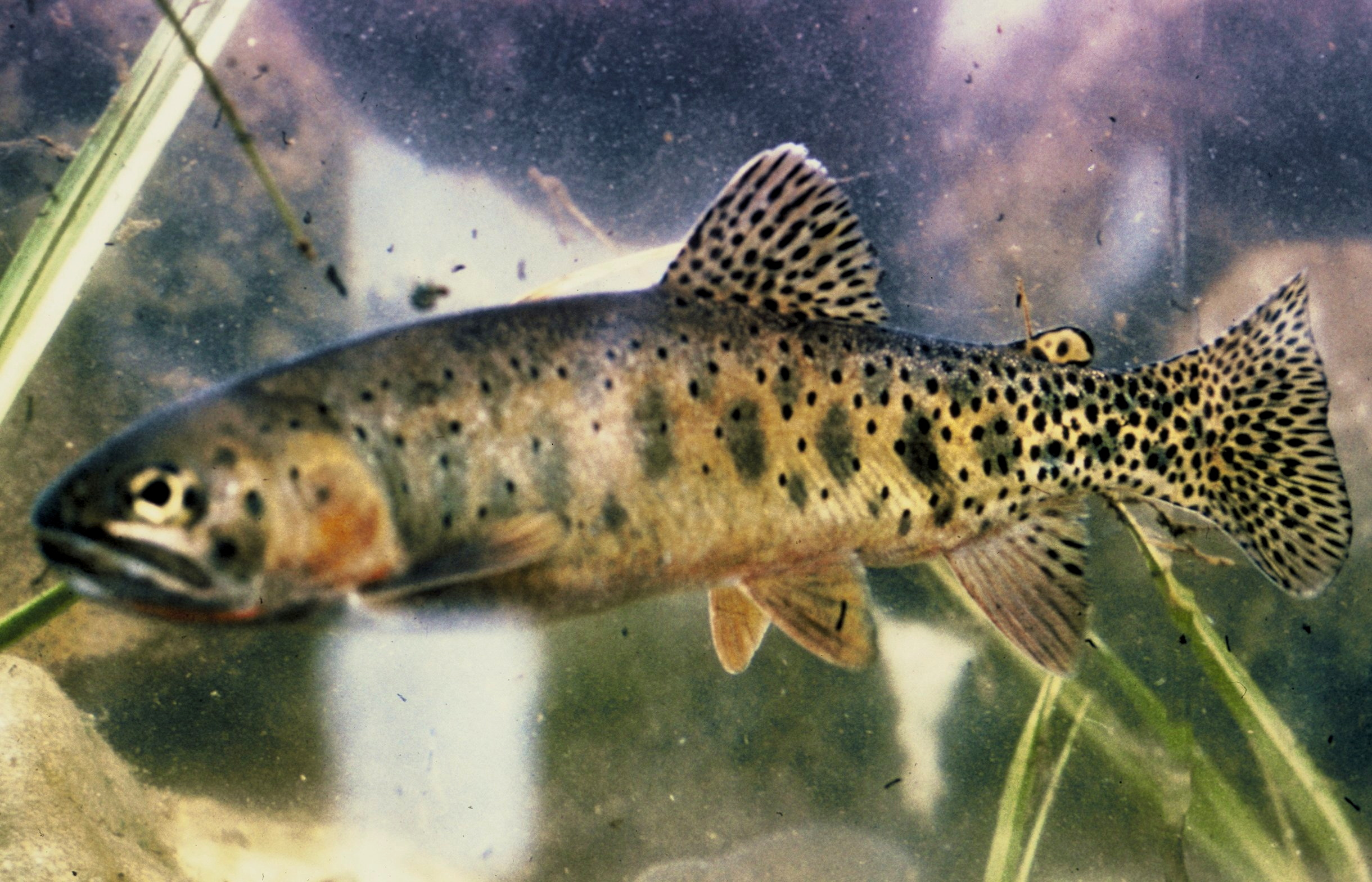
Rio Grande cutthroat trout, an endemic species that may be under threat

The Rio Grande in the Albuquerque Basin had a diverse population of mainly endemic fish up to the late nineteenth century. By the early 1960s many of the native species were no longer present in the northern part of the basin. Speckled chub and Rio Grande bluntnose shiner, two cyprinids, were last found in 1964. By the mid-1990s 45 species of fish were reported in the basin, of which only 17 were native. More than 40% of the native species of this section of the river have been eliminated. The main threats to the fish are diversion and pumping of water. River volumes peak between March and June due to the spring runoff, but demand for irrigation peaks between July and October. During the irrigation period, the river downstream from the Isleta diversion dam may largely dry up unless irrigation water is returned to the river or a summer storm provides a brief influx of water. Native fish may be trapped in pools in the river bed, where introduced game fish may take them, or they may die from loss of water in which they can live. The river may not start running steadily until the end of October, when irrigation stops.

=== Flora ===
Flora or vegetation surrounding the built portions of the city are typical of their desert southwestern and interior west setting, within the varied elevations and terrain. The limits are by significant urbanization, including much infill development occurring in the last quarter of the twentieth century.

Sandy soils include scrub and mesa vegetation such as sand sagebrush (Artemisia filifolia), fourwing saltbush (Atriplex canescens). Some similar grass and seasonal wildflower species occur that also occur in areas east of the Rio Grande, but in much lower densities. Sparsely as well, sandy soil grasses occur such as Indian ricegrass (Oryzopsis hymenoides), sand dropseed (Sporobolus cryptandrus), and mesa dropseed (Sporobolus flexuosus). Arroyos contain desert willow (Chilopsis linearis) while breaks and the prominent volcanic escarpment include threeleaf sumac with less frequent stands of oneseed juniper (Juniperus monosperma), netleaf hackberry (Celtis reticulata), mariola (Parthenium incanum), and beebrush or oreganillo (Aloysia wrightii). Isolated littleleaf sumac (Rhus microphylla) occurs on the hillsides above Taylor Ranch and at the Petroglyph National Monument Visitor Center.

Other areas of Albuquerque have more fine clay and caliche soils, plus more rainfall and slightly cooler temperatures, so natural vegetation is dominated by grassland species such as fluffgrass (Erioneuron pulchellum), purple threeawn (Hilaria mutica or Pleuraphis mutica), bush muhly (Muhlenbergia porteri), and black grama (Bouteloua eriopoda). Some woody plants occur in overall grassy areas, mainly fourwing saltbush (Atriplex canescens) and snakeweed (Gutierrezia microcephala). Isolated stands of creosote bush (Larrea tridentata) were reported by long-time residents on gravelly, desert pavement soils existing above arroyos and warm breaks, prior to urbanization in the Northeast Quadrant of Albuquerque. Today only remnants of creosote bush scrub remain in similar soils in foothill areas of Kirtland Air Force Base according to "Biologic Surveys for the Sandia National Laboratories Coyote Canyon Test Complex – Kirtland Air Force Base Albuquerque, New Mexico (Marron and Associates, Inc., May 1994)", then southward along sections of the western Manzano Foothills in Valencia County. In the lower foothills of the Sandia Mountains, loose or granitic soils help provide habitat for other species, such as feather dalea (Dalea formosa), mariola (Parthenium incanum), and beebrush or oreganillo (Aloysia wrightii).

Soaptree (Yucca elata) and broom dalea (Psorothamnus scoparius) are currently found or were once existing on sand hills and breaks on both sides of the Rio Grande Valley, roughly below the present-day locations of the Petroglyph Escarpment west of Coors Road and along Interstate 25 south of Sunport Boulevard.

The Rio Grande Valley proper bisects Albuquerque, and it has been urbanized the longest of all areas of the city. The present bosque or gallery forest of Rio Grande cottonwood (Populus deltoides var. wislizeni) and coyote willow (Salix exigua) is theorized to have been more savannah-like prior to replanting in the 1930s and upstream dams stifling the river's annual flood. New Mexico olive (Forestiera pubescens var. neomexicana) and Torrey wolfberry are common native understory shrubs. Discontinuous, small stands of Arizona walnut (Juglans major), and velvet ash (Fraxinus velutina) occasionally occur. Screwbean mesquite (Prosopis pubescens) can be found further south in the Albuquerque basin, but may be extirpated in its former range near Albuquerque. The forest now has a large proportion of non-native species including Siberian elm, Russian olive, saltcedar, mulberries, Ailanthus, and ravenna grass. Some restoration to native species is occurring, similar to the limited species of Populus and Salix used in the 1930s.

One prominent species of native mountainous trees is the piñon pine. At the east end of the city, the Sandia foothills receive about 50 percent more precipitation than most of the city, and with granitic, coarse soils, rock outcrops, and boulders dominant, they have a greater and different diversity of flora in the form of savanna and chaparral, dominated by lower and middle zones of New Mexico Mountains vegetation, with a slight orientation at lower elevations. Dominant plants include shrub or piñon pine, desert live oak (Quercus turbinella), gray oak (Quercus grisea), hairy mountain mahogany (Cercocarpus breviflorus), oneseed juniper (Juniperus monosperma), piñon (Pinus edulis), threeleaf sumac (Rhus trilobata), Engelmann prickly pear (Opuntia engelmannii), juniper prickly pear (Opuntia hystricina var. juniperiana), and beargrass (Nolina greenei, formerly considered Nolina texana). Similar grasses occur that are native to the eastern half of the city, but often of a higher density owing to increased precipitation. The foothills of Albuquerque are much less urbanized, the vegetation altered or removed than anywhere else in the city, though the lower areas have been mostly developed in a more dense suburban pattern in mostly developed communities including North Albuquerque Acres, Tanoan, High Desert, Glenwood Hills, Embudo Hills, Supper Rock, and Four Hills.

=== Fauna ===
An iconic bird often seen in Albuquerque is the greater roadrunner. Other birds include the common raven, American crow, great-tailed grackle, Gambel's and scaled quail, several species of hummingbirds, house finch, pigeon, mourning dove, white wing and European collared doves (both recent appearances), curve-billed thrasher, pinyon jay, and Cooper's, Swainson's, and red-tail hawks. The valley hosts sandhill cranes each winter.

Within city limits, the southwestern fence lizard and New Mexico whiptail (Aspidoscelis neomexicanus) are common. Snakes include the New Mexico garter snake and the bullsnake in the Rio Grande Bosque, and at the edges of the city, the venomous Western diamondback rattlesnake. Woodhouse toads and non-native bullfrogs are common around the Rio Grande. Retention ponds within the city often serve as breeding pools for New Mexico spadefoot toads and tadpole shrimp ("Triops").

Commonly seen mammals include the coyote, rock squirrel, Gunnison's prairie dog, desert cottontail, and black-tailed jackrabbit. Striped skunks, raccoons, and several mouse species can be found in the city, and mule deer and woodrats occur in the foothills. The broader area is home to bobcat, black bear, and mountain lion, and is at the north end of the range of the ringtail and javelina.

Larger arthropods include the plains cicada, vinegaroon, desert centipede, white-lined sphynx (hummingbird moth), two-tailed swallowtail, fig beetle, New Mexico mantis, and harvester ant.

== Groundwater ==
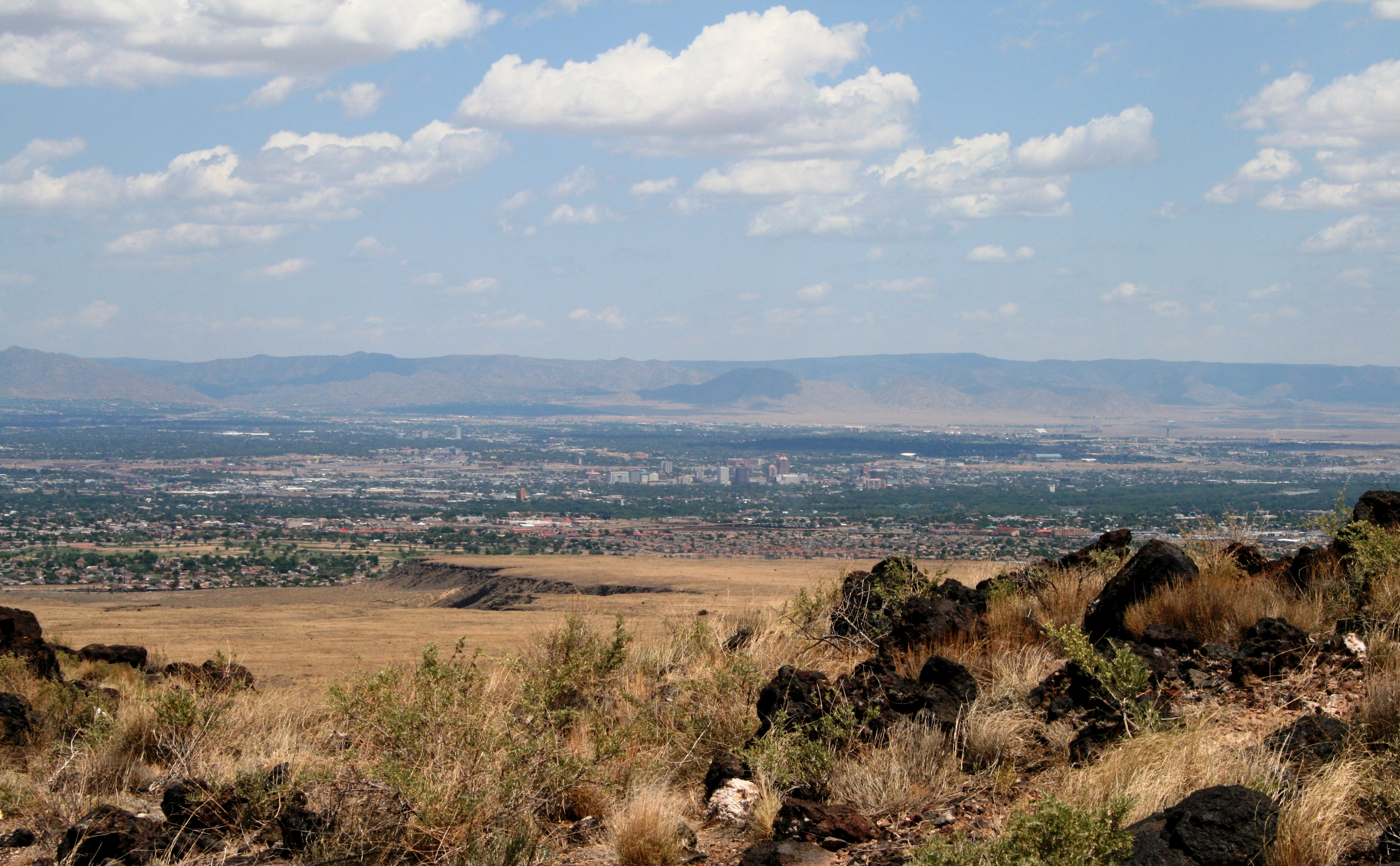
View of downtown Albuquerque and the Manzano Mountains from the West Mesa

Settlements in the region depend on groundwater. In the 1960s the City of Albuquerque began to extract large quantities of potable groundwater from wells drilled in the southeast and northeast heights. It was thought that this water came from a huge aquifer that would take centuries to exhaust. In the late 1980s there were declines in the water levels near Coronado Center causing concern that the water resource was not properly understood. Since 1992 the New Mexico Bureau of Geology and Mineral Resources has been undertaking extensive investigations of the geology of the basin and the aquifer.

The groundwater has been deposited in three main phases. The lower Santa Fe group was created by dune fields and small streams draining into playa lakes and mud flats. The sediments in this group yield low volumes of poor quality water. Deposits in the upper Santa Fe group come from drainage of the ancestral Rio Grande and the tributaries of that river. Although a small part of the total, most of the potable water in the region comes from these later deposits, which lie within 2 kilometres (1.2 mi) of the eastern boundary of the basin. Finally, the modern Rio Grande cut down into the Santa Fe group sediments to create the present river valley.

In the last 10,000 to 15,000 years the river valley has been receiving more sediment than it can carry away, building as much as 61 metres (200 ft) of new fill. There is groundwater in this new fill, which forms a thin aquifer very close to the surface and therefore very susceptible to contamination. Extraction of water from the valley floor aquifer is likely to cause subsidence and damage to buildings.

== Oil and gas ==
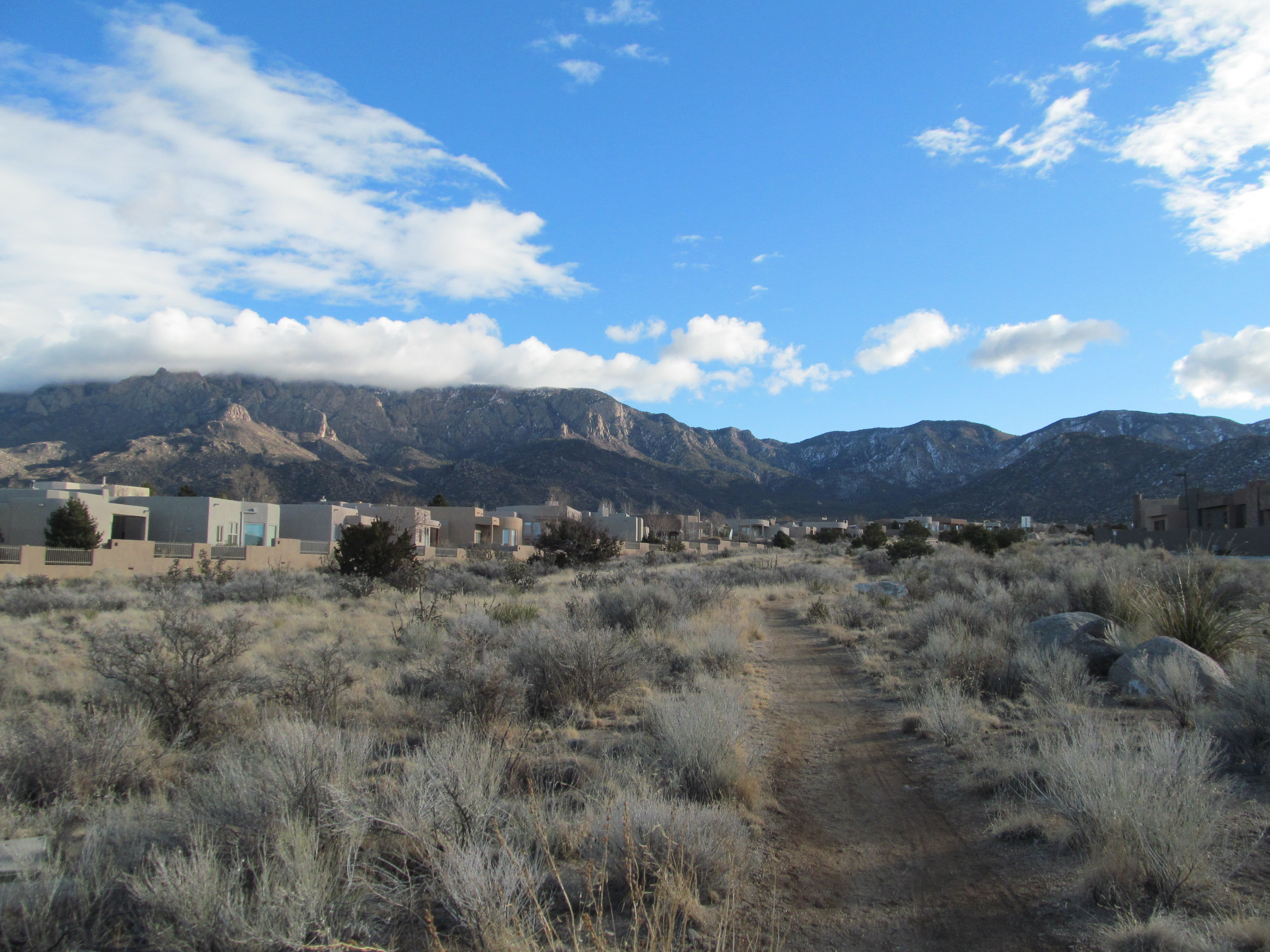
High Desert, Albuquerque, from the corner of Academy Rd. and Cortadena St.

Other basins in the Santa Fe rift hold oil and gas, which has been found in small quantities in wells east of Española and southwest of Santa Fe. The first known well to be drilled in the Albuquerque Basin in search of oil and gas was in 1914, and since then at least fifty exploratory wells have been drilled. Before 1953 most of these wells were shallow and only reached into the Tertiary deposits, but found numerous shows of oil and gas. After 1953 most of the wells were deeper, probing the Cretaceous deposits below the Tertiary fill. Royal Dutch Shell and other companies drilled wells in the 1970s and 1980s, mostly from 11,000 to 14,000 feet (3,400 to 4,300 m) deep. They found gas in the Cretaceous rocks, but not in commercial quantities. Exploration was halted in the late 1980s and early 1990s due to low global oil prices.

In 2001 the U.S. Geological Survey published a report on the probability that gas would be found in the basin. It noted that the Albuquerque Basin, like other basins formed during the Laramide orogeny, contains a thick layer of coals, carbonaceous shales and marine shales from the Cretaceous era. These are thought to be the source of basin-centered accumulations of gas. Unlike other basins in the region, the Albuquerque Basin is still actively subsiding. The temperature and pressure on the hydrocarbon source rocks in the deeper parts of the basin will be causing gas to generate, and the gas is probably migrating upward and accumulating in Upper Cretaceous sandstones. After discussing other factors, the report concluded "All of these characteristics suggest that a basin-centered gas accumulation of some sort is present in the Albuquerque Basin."

In 2007-2008 the Houston-based Tecton Energy had obtained the mineral rights to about 50,000 acres (20,000 ha) owned by SunCal, and had been exploring for natural gas on the Southwest Mesa. About 46 test wells had been drilled in the basin. Plans to exploit gas were opposed by activists concerned about damage to groundwater and to the environment if exploitation were allowed. In January 2008 Governor Bill Richardson imposed a six-month moratorium on further exploration.

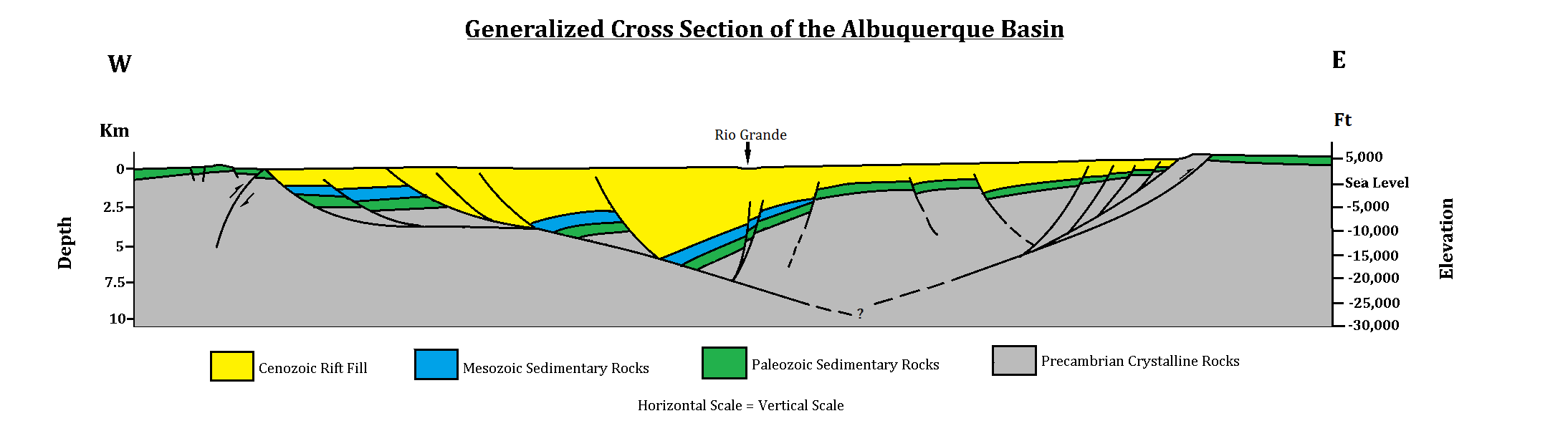
A generalized cross section of the Albuquerque Basin from east to west. Note the half-graben geometry, paleozoic and mesozoic sediments that existed pre-rift, and the large (up to 28%) amount of extension. Carbon-rich cretaceous deposits are in the upper Mesozoic.
