= San Acacia Diversion Dam =

- Location within New Mexico
- Country: United States
- Location: San Acacia, New Mexico
- Coordinates: 34.256376°N 106.88739°W
- Purpose: Irrigation
- Opening date: 1934
- Owner: Middle Rio Grande Conservancy District

Dam and spillways
- Type of dam: Diversion dam
- Height: 17 feet (5.2 m)
- Length: 700 feet (210 m)

The San Acacia Diversion Dam is a structure built in 1934 for the Middle Rio Grande Conservancy District (MRGCD) near to San Acacia, New Mexico, United States. It diverts water from the Rio Grande into irrigation canals.

== Structure ==
The dam is location on the Rio Grande about 0.75 miles (1.21 km) north of San Acacia, New Mexico. There are significant archeological sites along the left abutment of the diversion dam and the river embankments. There is a spoil levee about 500 feet (150 m) upstream from the dam. Scour by the river on the bank here was causing persistent bank erosion.

The dam was built in 1934 and rehabilitated by the Bureau of Reclamation in 1957 as part of the Middle Rio Grande Project. It is 17 feet (5.2 m) high and 700 feet (210 m) long, a concrete structure with 29 radial gates. The dam serves the Socorro Division, and has a diversion capacity of 283 cubic feet (8.0 m^{3}) per second. The dam diverts river water into the Socorro Main Canal operated by the MRGCD. It can also divert water into the Low Flow Conveyance Channel, operated by the United States Bureau of Reclamation. The Low Flow Conveyance Channel runs along the Rio Grande for 58 miles (93 km) from the San Acacia Diversion Dam to the narrows above Elephant Butte Reservoir.

== Impact ==
A 2003 report noted that there had been silting upstream of the dam but the width of the downstream channels had decreased sharply since the diversion dam was built. The river has cut a deeper channel in its bed and now runs faster. This made it harder for fish to travel upstream. The report suggested that if eight Gradient Restoration Facilities were installed in the downstream reach, that should be enough to slow the water, allowing sediment to settle and making fish passage easier. A 2005 report considered removing the dam altogether. Again, it suggested emplacement of Gradient Restoration Facilities to control erosion as sediment above and below the dam returned to normal levels.

Concerns about the survival of the endangered Rio Grande silvery minnow raised in Rio Grande Silvery Minnow v. Bureau of Reclamation led to the United States Bureau of Reclamation working with the United States Fish and Wildlife Service (USFWS) to try to rescue the fish. A number of projects are being undertaken to restore the silvery minnow's habitat, including a study of ways to allow the fish to pass the diversion dam. A requirement for a fish passage was given in the Biological Opinion (BO) issued in March 2003 by the USFWS. Water has been released from upstream reservoirs to supply more water to the habitat of the silvery minnow, and the Department of Reclamation is leasing water from the owners of water rights for this purpose. Water from the Low Flow Conveyance Channel is being pumped into sections of the river that regularly run dry.
