= Middle Rio Grande Conservancy District =

Irrigation District in Central New Mexico

Agency overview
- Formed: 16 August 1925
- Type: Water management authority
- Headquarters: Albuquerque, New Mexico, United States
- Website: www.mrgcd.com

The Middle Rio Grande Conservancy District (MRGCD) was formed in 1925 to manage the irrigation systems and control floods in the Albuquerque Basin. It is responsible for the stretch of river from the Cochiti Dam in Sandoval County in the north, through Bernalillo County, Valencia County and Socorro County to the Elephant Butte Reservoir in the south. It manages the Angostura, Isleta and San Acacia diversion dams, which feed an extensive network of irrigation canals and ditches.

== Background ==
The Pueblo people of the Rio Grande valley had developed initial irrigation systems in the Rio Grande valley by the 10th century AD. These systems used a main acequia (shared irrigation ditch) into which water was diverted from the river, with secondary ditches leading off the main channel named for specific families. Maintenance of the main acequia would be a community responsibility.

The Spanish arrived in New Mexico in 1598, and used Indian labor to extend the system of irrigation ditches. In 1848 Mexico ceded the territory to the United States. Railways arrived in 1880, bringing new settlers. The Federal government encouraged irrigation, which probably peaked in the early 1890s.

After this there was a steady decline in irrigation due to "droughts, sedimentation, aggradation of the main channel, salinization, seepage and waterlogging". Part of the problem was caused by increased use of the river for irrigation in the San Luis Valley upstream in Colorado. Development and deforestation there caused silt to be washed into the river.

Where the river widens and slows in the middle Rio Grande valley around Albuquerque the silt was deposited, raising the riverbed and the water table and causing waterlogging in the farmlands that border the river. By the time the Middle Rio Grande Conservancy District was founded in 1923, more than 60,000 acres (24,000 ha) of farmland had become swamps or alkaline and salt grass fields. Floods were another hazard, often destroying whole villages. The acequia running through the city of Albuquerque, parallel to the river, had become an unsanitary drainage ditch, serving as a common sewer.

== Initial construction ==
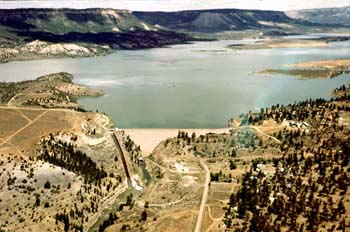
El Vado storage dam

A first attempt to create the Middle Rio Grande Conservancy District was made in 1923, but failed due to legal problems. The backers persisted, and the district was successfully established as of 16 August 1925. The goals of the Conservancy were to protect the villages in the valley from floods, drain the swamps and provide water for irrigating the farms. In most areas the plan was to reduce the water table to 4 to 6 feet (1.2 to 1.8 m). Irrigation water would be provided for 128,787 acres (52,118 ha) of arable land. 18% of the land was Indian land, which caused some concern over whether Indian rights were being sufficiently protected, but the plan was finally approved by the president on 13 March 1928.

By 1935 the Conservancy had built almost 200 miles (320 km) of levees along the river banks, and a system of jetties and checks to protect against floods. The Conservancy had built the El Vado storage dam, and the Cochiti, Angostura, Isleta, and San Acacia diversion dams to channel water into irrigation canals for each section of the river. 180 miles (290 km) of new main canal were built and 294 miles (473 km) of lateral ditches in addition to 214 miles (344 km) of existing laterals. 341 miles (549 km) of drainage canal were built to lower the water table. 118,000 acres (48,000 ha) were developed, of which 20,700 acres (8,400 ha) were Indian lands. 59,159 acres (23,941 ha) were being irrigated.

== Problems and rehabilitation ==
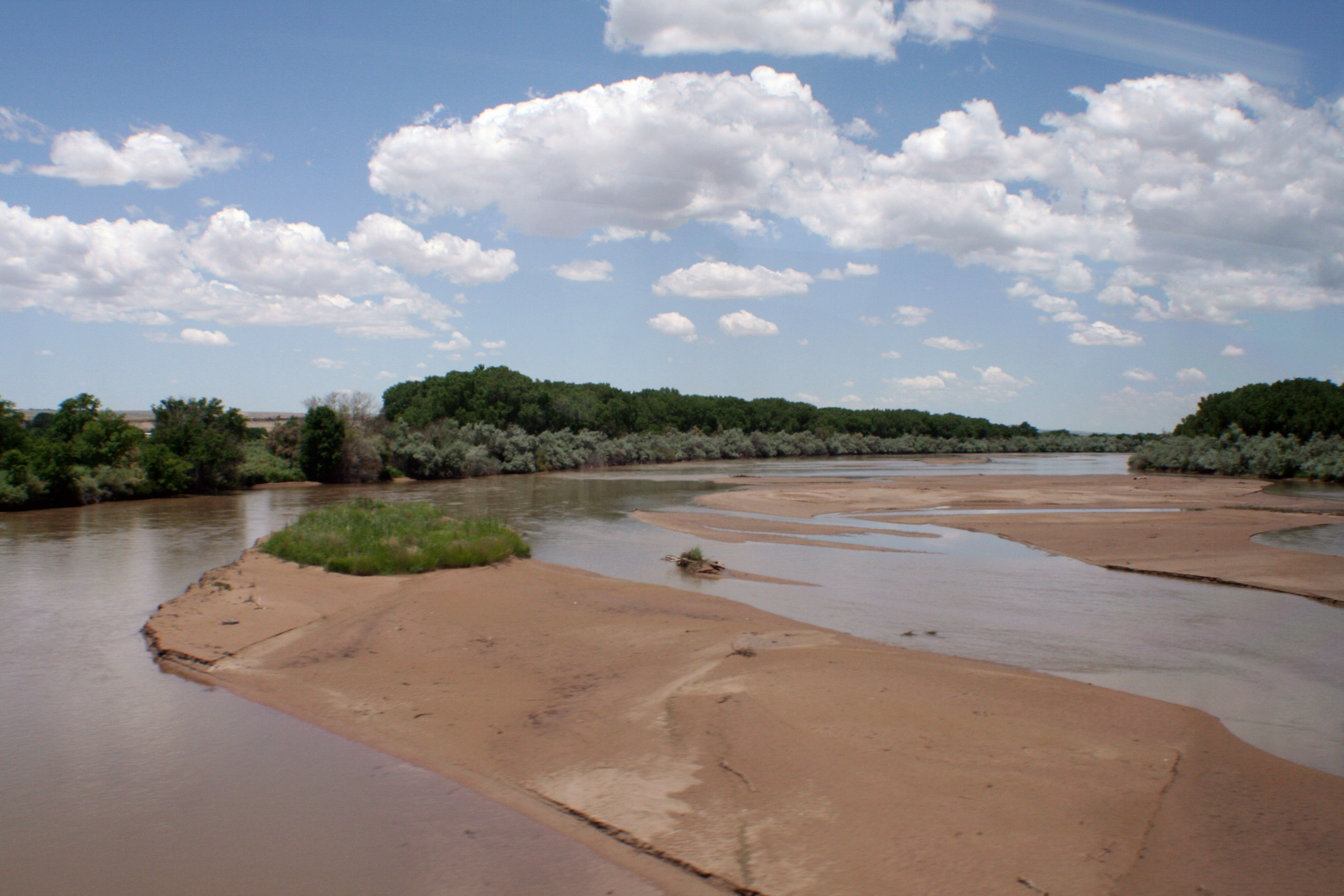
Rio Grande near Isleta Pueblo

The initial construction project had been rushed. Few of the ditches were cemented, and maintenance was neglected. Salt grass, weeds and bush began to encroach. Sediment continued to build up in the main river bed, making it possible that the river would continue to rise and would render the work that had been done pointless, with waterlogging returning. Another problem was that the Conservancy was charging assessments based on the benefits delivered. These were highest for the reclaimed fields, whose owners were least able to pay and often were forced to sell. The Conservancy ran into financial difficulties in the 1940s. It was unable to raise enough money for maintenance, let alone capital projects, and much of the land that could be irrigated was not because the farmers could not afford the water assessment fees. The earth levees were not able to contain a major flood in 1941, which inundated communities throughout the river valley, including some of downtown Albuquerque.

The Conservancy turned to the United States Bureau of Reclamation for help in reviewing and rehabilitating the work. Planning was approved in 1948, and the Middle Rio Grande Project was approved in May 1950. During the 1950s a series of projects was undertaken by the Bureau of Reclamation and the Corps of Engineers under the Rio Grande Comprehensive Plan. They rehabilitated the El Vado Dam and the diversion dams. The Cochiti Diversion Dam was inundated by the newly built Cochiti Storage Dam, completed in 1975. The project also undertook extensive work on the river channel, straightening and strengthened the banks and clearing the floodway. In 1971 a dam was completed on the Rio Chama to hold water brought from the San Juan River through a tunnel.

== Operation ==
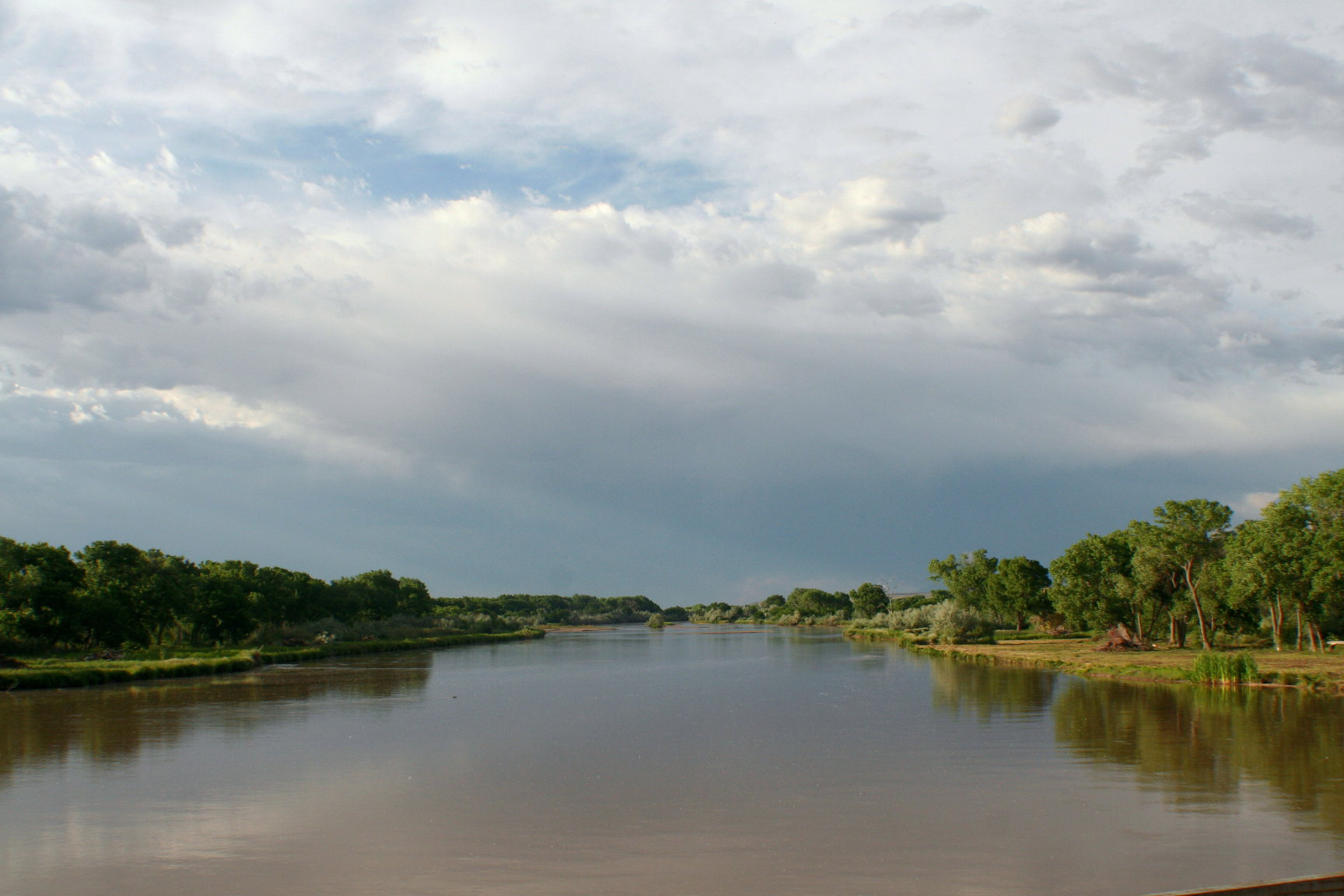
Rio Grande at Isleta in June 2007

With the Middle Rio Grande Project the Bureau of Reclamation took responsibility for El Vado dam and for maintaining the Rio Grande river channel from Velarde to the narrows of Elephant Butte Reservoir. The Corps of Engineers maintains Cochiti Dam. The Conservancy remains responsible for the three diversion dams and all the irrigation facilities. As of 2012 the Conservancy was responsible for an area of 278,000 acres (113,000 ha), of which 128,787 acres (52,118 ha) could be irrigated and 70,000 acres (28,000 ha) were in fact being irrigated by 11,000 farmers. The Conservancy was maintaining four diversion dams and reservoirs, 834 miles (1,342 km) of canals and ditches and 404 miles (650 km) of riverside drains.

The Conservancy is a major recipient of water from the San Juan–Chama Project, a series of tunnels and diversions that take water from the drainage basin of the San Juan River – a tributary of the Colorado River – to supplement water resources in the Rio Grande watershed. 24% of the 3,755,307,600 cubic feet (106,338,470 m^{3}) annual supply is allocated to the MRGCD, while 56% is allocated to the city of Albuquerque.

== Environmental impacts ==
River volumes peak between March and June due to the spring runoff, but demand for irrigation peaks between July and October. Both the Isleta diversion dam just south of Albuquerque and the San Acacia diversion dam further south are able to route all water out of the river during low-flow conditions. During the irrigation period, the river downstream from the Isleta Diversion Dam may largely dry up unless irrigation water is returned to the river or a summer storm provides a brief influx of water. The river may not start running steadily until the end of October, when irrigation stops. This has caused problems for fish such as the Rio Grande silvery minnow. This fish used to be one of the most common fish in the river. The diversion dams have cut its habitat into four separate segments. It is now classified as endangered and its population continues to decline.

In 1999 a suit was brought by a group of environmentalist organizations on behalf of the silvery minnow and the threatened Southwestern willow flycatcher, whose riparian habitat was also threatened, against the Bureau of Reclamation and the Corps of Engineers. The suit claimed violation of the Endangered Species Act and the National Environmental Policy Act. The Conservancy became involved in 2002. Eventually Rio Grande Silvery Minnow v. Bureau of Reclamation was dismissed in 2010. However, the Department of Reclamation is working on various improvements to management of the river to assist in improving the water supply and habitats of both species.

Irrigated agriculture does not contribute noticeable amounts of nitrogen and phosphorus to the river. The Albuquerque waste-water treatment plant contributes more, but not a great deal. However, in the 1990s high concentrations of un-ionized ammonia were found, caused by impaired water use in the section of the Rio Grande between the Jemez River and the Isleta Dam. The ammonia is toxic to some species of fish and invertebrates.

Improved drainage has dried out the wetlands, harming native plants and wildlife. The frequency of wildfires has increased. In response, the Isleta Pueblo and consultants have been developing a plan to reduce the risk of fire, prioritize fire fighting to focus on areas dominated by native vegetation, replant cottonwood and willows along the banks, restore riparian grasslands and search for ways to better manage the dam.

== Changing priorities ==
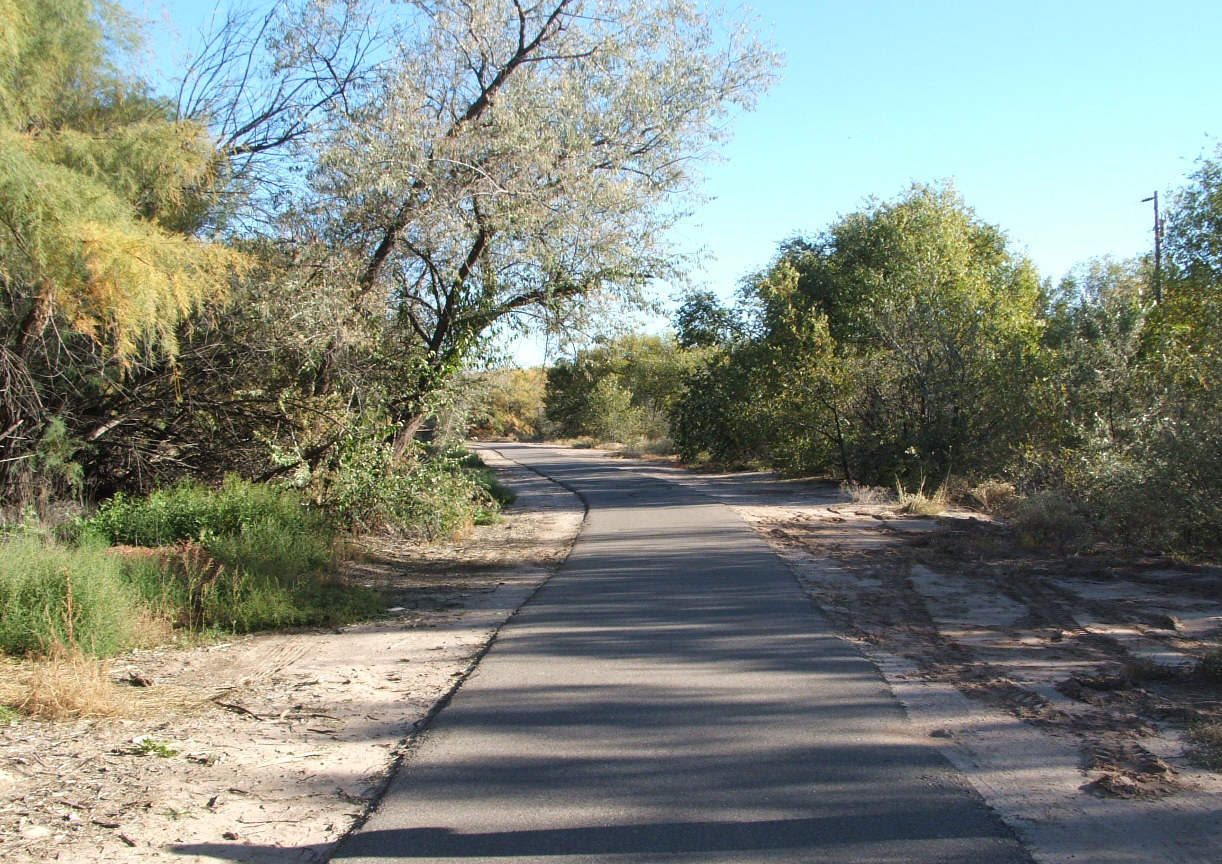
The Paseo del Bosque Trail in the Rio Grande Valley State Park

During and after World War II, the city of Albuquerque has grown steadily. With growing urbanization, the role of the Conservancy has gradually shifted from supporting agriculture to preserving the riverside ecology and helping to recharge the Albuquerque aquifer. In the Albuquerque metropolitan area, three quarters of the 316 miles (509 km) of channels are used for recreational purposes, and in the Conservancy as a whole one third of the waterways have recreational use. Ditches are used as horse, bike and running trails, wildlife habitat and fishing holes. The Conservancy owns and manages 30,000 acres (12,000 ha) of bosque including Tingley Park, San Gabriel Park, the Rio Grande Nature Center, and the Rio Grande Valley State Park.

The Conservancy collaborated in the Albuquerque Overbank Project, which started in 1998, with organizations such as the Department of Biology of the University of New Mexico, the Bureau of Reclamation, the City of Albuquerque Open Space Division and others. This project cleared an attached bar of a dense 1.4 hectares (3.5 acres) stand of Russian olive, lowered part of the bar to promote flooding, and built channel on the bar to encourage growth of cottonwood and willows. The changing ecology of the site is being carefully monitored, and initial results have been very encouraging, apparently restoring native plants and making the water flow more variable in response to discharges.

A 2003 report noted that there had been silting upstream of the Acacia diversion dam but the width of the downstream channels in Socorro county had decreased sharply since the diversion dam was built. The river has cut a deeper channel in its bed and now runs faster. This made it harder for fish to travel upstream. The report suggested that if eight Gradient Restoration Facilities were installed in the downstream reach, that should be enough to slow the water, allowing sediment to settle and making fish passage easier. A 2005 report considered removing the dam altogether. Again, it suggested emplacement of Gradient Restoration Facilities to control erosion as sediment above and below the dam returned to normal levels.

== See also ==
- Rio Grande dams and diversions
- Rio Grande Project
