= Cochiti Dam =

Dam in New Mexico, US

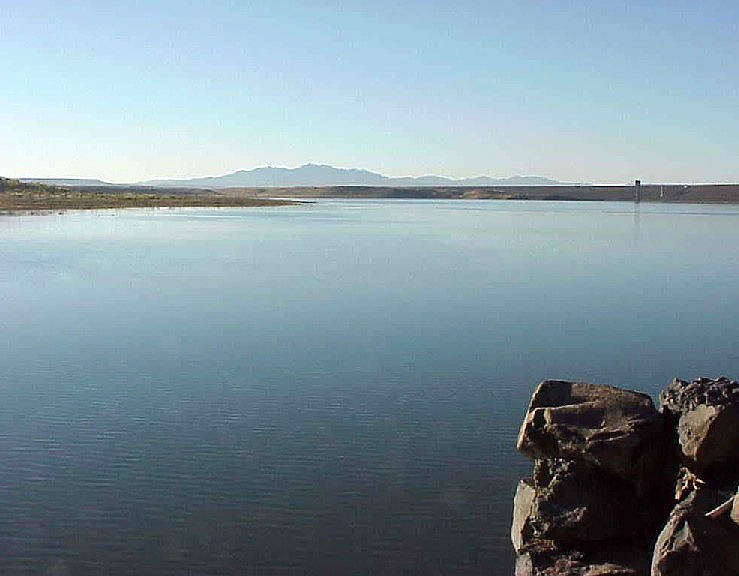
- Cochiti Dam from lake side
- Interactive map of Cochiti Dam
- Official name: Cochiti Dam
- Location: Cochiti Pueblo, Sandoval County, New Mexico, USA
- Coordinates: 35.6107°N 106.3132°W
- Construction began: 1965
- Opening date: 1973
- Operator: United States Army Corps of Engineers

Dam and spillways
- Impounds: Rio Grande, Santa Fe River
- Height: 251 ft (76.5 m)
- Length: 29,040 ft (8,852 m)
- Width (base): 1,760 ft (536.4 m)

Reservoir
- Creates: Cochiti Lake
- Total capacity: 718,019 acre-feet (885,663,000 m^{3})
- Active capacity: 49,359 acre-feet (60,883,000 m^{3})

Cochiti Dam is an earthen fill dam located on the Rio Grande in Sandoval County, New Mexico, approximately 50 miles (80 km) north of Albuquerque, New Mexico, in the United States. It also impounds the Santa Fe River. By volume of material, it is the 23rd largest dam in the world at 62,849,000 yd^{3} (48,052,000 m^{3}) of material, one of the ten largest such dams in the United States, and the eleventh largest such dam in the world. Cochiti Dam is one of the four United States Army Corps of Engineers projects for flood and sediment control on the Rio Grande system, operating in conjunction with Abiquiu Dam, Galisteo Dam and Jemez Canyon Dam.

== Description ==
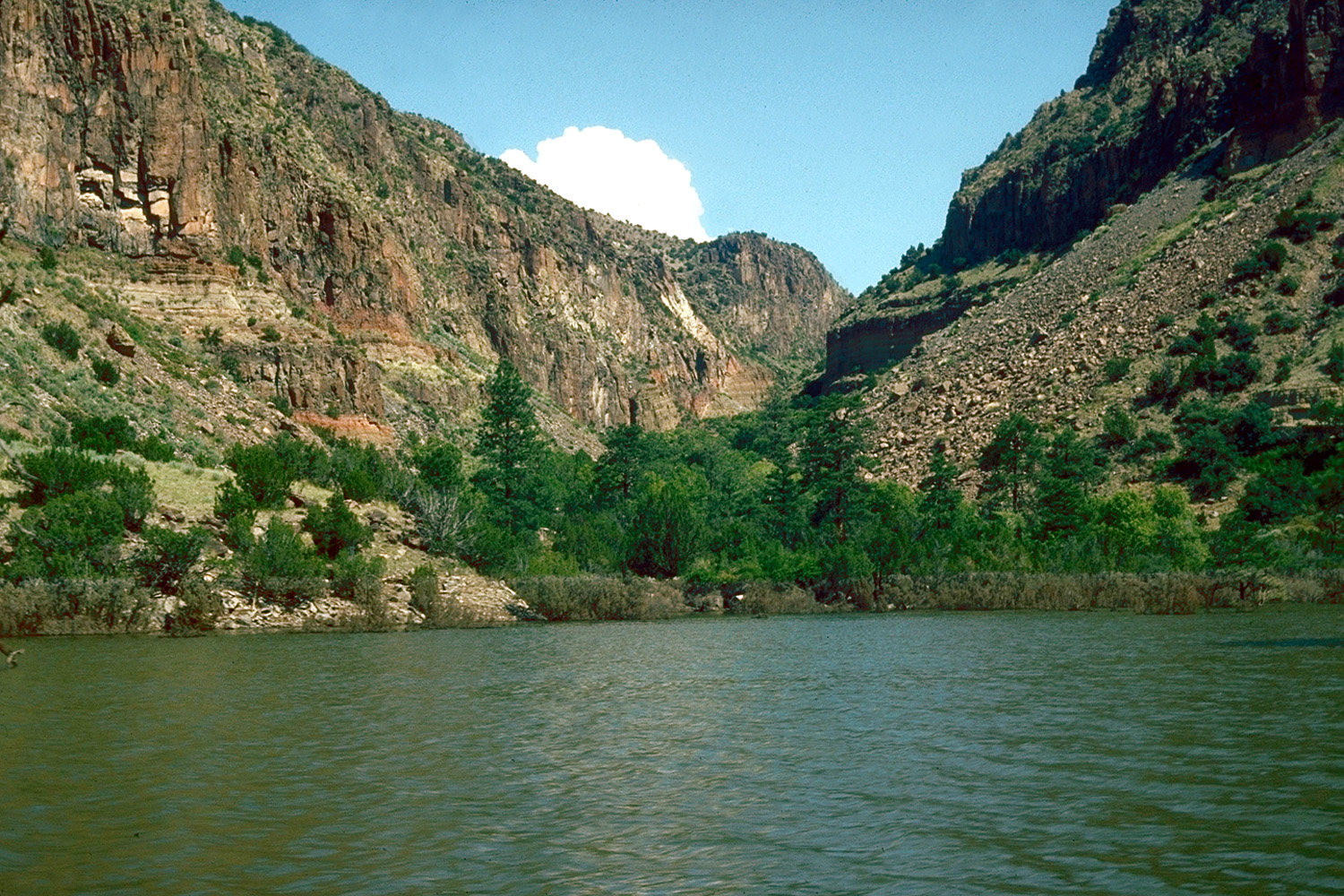
A view of the shoreline of Cochiti Lake, impounded by Cochiti Dam

Cochiti Dam is primarily a flood control dam built to ameliorate the effects of heavy runoff. The dam and the resultant lake also had the secondary purposes of creating recreational and wildlife habitat resources. The outlet works of the dam have an outflow capacity of 14,790 feet^{3}/s (418.8 m^{3}/s).

Cochiti Dam is operated to bypass all inflow to the lake to the extent that downstream channel conditions are capable of safely bypassing the flow. Flood-control operations are initiated when inflow to the lake is in excess of the downstream channel capacity. Stored floodwaters are released when downstream channel conditions permit, all in accordance with the provisions of Public Law 86-645 and the Rio Grande Compact.

Cochiti Dam marks the beginning of the Middle Rio Grande Conservancy District (MRGCD), Cochiti Division. It controls runoff water from an 11,695 square miles (30,290 km^{2}) drainage area.

== History ==
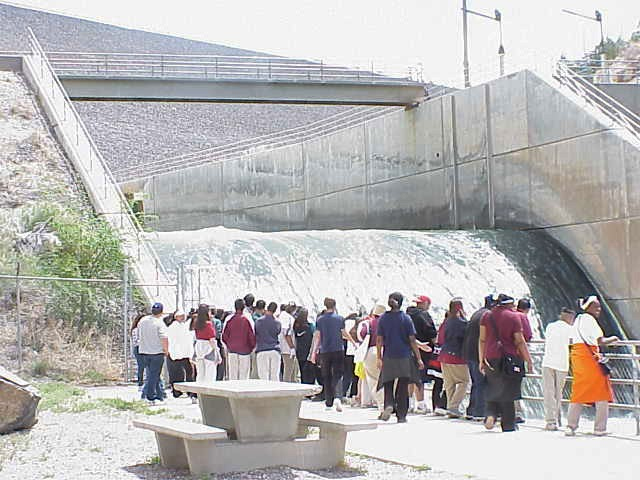
Outlet flow at Cochiti Dam in 2002

Cochiti Dam was authorized under the Flood Control Act of 1960 for a construction cost of US$94.4 million. The act was further amended in 1964 to allocate water resources for the development of fish and wildlife resources as well as recreational resources. 50,000 acre-feet (62,000,000 m^{3}) of water was allocated under this amendment for initial pool fill and sufficient resources were allocated to offset annual evaporation losses. This water was to come from water previously diverted into the Rio Grande system by Public Law 87-843 of 1962 from water in the Colorado River basin via the San Juan–Chama Project across the Continental Divide.

The dam was one of the projects proposed in 1966 for nuclear quarrying projects under Project Travois, a component of Project Plowshare. After a proposed project for quarrying at Buchanan Dam in California was abandoned, Cochiti Dam was the next project to be considered for the use of nuclear explosives to create large amounts of rockfill aggregate. Since the Cochiti project was already underway by this time, the proposal was abandoned, and considerations moved to damsites in Idaho and Oregon.

Construction began in 1965. Impoundment of water in Cochiti Lake began in 1973. Archaeological surveys were made prior to filling of the lake. The filling of the lake inundated the Cochiti Diversion Dam which had previously been used for irrigation purposes, and which had been rehabilitated by the United States Bureau of Reclamation in 1958 as part of the Middle Rio Grande Project. The new dam replaced this functionality.

Construction of the dam was opposed by the Cochiti Keres Pueblo people, who lost significant tracts of agricultural land as a result of the construction and subsequent pool filling. The Cochiti Keres filed a lawsuit against the Army Corps of Engineers regarding the inundation of their lands, winning the suit. In 2001, the Army Corps of Engineers made a public apology to the Cochiti Keres.

== Cochiti Lake ==
Cochiti Lake has maintained a permanent recreation pool of approximately 62,000,000 m^{3} (50,000 acre⋅ft) since the dam was completed. The permanent pool, which includes an intermittent pond in the arm of the Santa Fe River, provides sediment control benefits, trapping about 1,200,000 m^{3} (970 acre⋅ft) of sediment per year. The permanent pool was established by and is maintained by San Juan-Chama Project water. The remaining capacity of the reservoir, totaling about 672,000,000 m^{3} (545,000 acre⋅ft), is reserved for flood and sediment control. The elevation of the lake at surface of the normal pool is 5,335 ft (1626 m) above sea level.

There are two public recreation areas on the lake, one on the west side of the lake at Cochiti Recreation Area and one on the east at Tetilla Peak Recreation Area. Other lands around the lake are owned by and are part of the Pueblo de Cochiti Indian Reservation and are not open to the public. A visitor center is open to the public near the park headquarters. Fishing is permitted on the lake, with smallmouth bass and northern pike species among other species being available. Cochiti Lake is a no-wake lake, and boats are restricted to trolling speeds.

== The pueblo of Cochiti and the Cochiti Dam ==
Cochiti, New Mexico, has long been home to the indigenous tribe Pueblo of Cochiti. This tribe is also referred to as Ko-Tyit. Their native language is Keresan. The history of the Pueblo goes back millenniums, “pueblo cultures and the Keresan people have occupied the region for thousands of years”. The Pueblo of Cochiti have a long rich history dating back to the Ancestral Puebloans who settled near Frijoles Canyon around 1250 AD. From the beginning, their lives were controlled by the Spanish until 1581 but continued undergoing slavery, false imprisonment, and the banning of cultural and religious practices. In 1680 the people of the Pueblo of Cochiti took part in the Pueblo revolts and fled to near present-day Cochiti, New Mexico. Today the Pueblo of Cochiti live on around 50,000 acres in New Mexico, just outside of Albuquerque, and have a population of under 2,000. They are best known for their jewelry, pottery, and drum-making today.

Cochiti Lake is one of the United States’ largest man-made lakes. Like the Cochiti Dam, the Cochiti Lake was created and operated by the U.S. Army Corps of Engineers. Congress allowed for the creation of the dam under the Flood Control Act of 1960. The construction began in 1965 and was finally filled with water in 1973 and was finally finished and completed by 1975. The lake and Dam are located in Sandoval County, New Mexico, and within the reservation of the Pueblo de Cochiti Nation. But even though the Dam is within the reservation, it was created and helped managed by the U.S. Army Corps of Engineers. Of the around 50,000 acres of ancestral Cochiti lands, 11,000 of those acres are occupied by the Cochiti Dam.

Indigenous peoples have a long history of surviving, adapting, and connecting to the environment in a unique and special way. Indigenous nations account for twenty-two percent of the world's surface and hold eighty percent of the planet's remaining biodiversity. Indigenous peoples treat the land as a sacred place that for millennia has been used for ecological and spiritual practices. The United Nations states that “Indigenous Peoples are inheritors and practitioners of unique cultures and ways of relating to people and the environment. They have retained social, cultural, economic and political characteristics that are distinct from those of the dominant societies in which they live.”. Infrastructure and construction at the governmental level have a long history of uprooting indigenous communities and reservations around the United States.

The way of life of the Pueblo of Cochiti has been forever changed by the creation of the Cochiti Lake and Cochiti Dam. When creating the dam, seepage occurred and flooded the lands of the Cochiti; “the Cochiti lost their agricultural way of life and have suffered profound consequences as a result.” This is important because the economy of the Pueblo of Cochiti has been historically and still is today tied to agriculture. Not only is the economy affected by the Dam, but so are the Pueblo's cultural practices. Within the Dam area is The Whirlpool Rock, a sacred space for the Pueblos of Cochiti. The U.S. Army Corps of Engineers destroyed The Whirlpool Rock when creating the Dam, despite promising that they would not. This action has impacted the religious practices of the Cochiti and neighboring Pueblos.

The Cochiti Dam has uprooted the cultural practices and ecosystem of the land that the Pueblo of Cochiti have lived and worked on since the beginning of their time. According to Regis Pecos, a lifetime member of the Traditional Tribal Council, since the creation of the lake and the dam “Cochiti Pueblo has been in a fight for their survival culturally, politically, legally, economically, and environmentally”. It is said that because of the creation of the land the Pueblo of Cochiti have to “fight for survival”. To overcome this the Cochiti has a mission statement that states “With guidance and support from leadership, inclusive of the community, our mission is to overcome obstacles to preserve and revitalize the Cochiti way of life. We are committed to creating high-quality opportunities for our community members while enhancing our tribal infrastructure to maintain our inherent sovereignty”. Sovereignty is a self-governing state. The Pueblo of Cochiti are trying to get their land back and maintain their own sovereignty and not be controlled and managed by the government.

The Pueblo of Cochiti strongly opposed the building of the Dam in the 1960s. But since the mid to late 1970s the opposition weakened. This was due to the impacts of affirmative action and the U.S. Civil Rights Movement. Pecos explains that the U.S. government used the Pueblo of Cochiti people as pawns during wartime. The U.S. government used manipulation to enlist the Pueblo of Cochiti in World War I, World War II, and the Korean War to persuade others to agree to the dam project. The U.S. government did this by telling the enlisted Pueblo of Cochiti “You understand the things that those who never left do not. You are smart to catch on to how business works.”. The people of Cochiti lost their sacred and agricultural land to the U.S. government and Army Corps of Engineers. After World War II, the Pueblos of Cochiti had to combine their old ways of life with newer off-reservation employment to continue to survive.

There has been a long history of reports and lawsuits filed by the Pueblo of Cochiti on the U.S. Army Corps of Engineers and the U.S. government. In 1976, right after the Cochiti Dam was constructed the Pueblo of Cochiti filed their first report of damages to their farmland due to the rising water table that the dam created. Years after the report was filed, the U.S. Army Corps of Engineers installed a drainage system that was 17 acres, but it was ineffective. It was not until 1988, that the U.S. Army Corps of Engineers took responsibility for the Dam creating agricultural issues. In 1987 professors at New Mexico State University found that 550 of the 800 acres of the irrigated Cochiti tribal land was now unsuitable to use for agricultural practices. The lawsuit was settled in 1990 and the U.S. government provided $4.5 million for the cost of maintenance on the drainage system.

The Pueblo of Cochiti filed another lawsuit against the U.S. Army Corps of Engineers to hold them liable for the destruction, devastation, and violation of their sacred lands and the abominable impacts the Dam has had on their reservation. The Pueblo of Cochiti were not protected under the constitution or the American Indian Religious Freedom Act because their native religion is technically defined as an "unorthodox religion" which is not protected under the act. This meant that they could not use their religion to protect the land that was destroyed by the floods. The Pueblo of Cochiti almost gave up hope, until 1983 and 1984 when Congressman Bill Richardson caught wind of the injustices and created a bill to give back the Pueblo of Cochiti their ancestral lands. Richardson and the Pueblo of Cochiti worked together to get back 25,000 acres of their lands. Congressman Richardson is considered a “light” during a difficult time in the Cochiti reservation.

Cultural Survival is an organization whose mission statement is “Cultural Survival advocates for Indigenous Peoples' rights and supports Indigenous communities’ self-determination, cultures, and political resilience, since 1972.”. According to Sandra Lee, an author of Cultural Survival, the Pueblo of Cochiti is working and negotiating with a difficult government agency, the U.S. Army Corps of Engineers, she calls them an “unresponsive US government agency.”.

Along with the lawsuit, in 2016 the Cochiti people motioned for a bill called S. 2643, also called The Pueblo Of Cochiti Self Governance Act. This act subscribes to the Westfield Settlement Agreement amendment of 2015. This act would release the U.S. Army Corps of Engineers and the U.S. government of management and allow the Pueblo of Cochiti to have legal and financial responsibility for the management of the Cochiti Dam. With the Pueblo of Cochiti having full responsibility for the Dam, they would be able to restore their ancestral and historical lands. This act would also “expand the authorized used of accumulated drainage system reserve funds for the acquisition of ancestral lands known as the Cañada de Cochiti”, the Cañada de Cochiti being the Cochiti Canyon. This means that the Pueblo of Cochiti would be able to reacquire their ancestral homelands for free, not having to pay any federal, state, or local governments, but this has yet to pass.

Years after the Las Conchas fire in New Mexico, which destroyed the lands around them, the Pueblo of Cochiti came to an agreement with the state of New Mexico for a land exchange. The agreement is that if the Pueblo of Cochiti purchases land with the same value as the state states that the reservation is, New Mexico will transfer the ownership of the Cañada de Cochiti to the Pueblo of Cochiti. This would allow for the state of New Mexico to have more income-generating land and the Pueblo of Cochiti to have the land back for cultural usage. However, the Cañada de Cochiti was appraised at around 5 million dollars (Garcia, 2016). This makes it practically impossible for the Pueblo of Cochiti to reclaim their land due to the high economic price and stress in a short amount of time. For this agreement, S. 2643, to come to fruition and give back ancestral lands to the Pueblo of Cochiti Congress must endorse this.

== See also ==
- Project Travois
