= List of Rio Grande dams and diversions =

Rio Grande and Pecos watershed showing dams and diversions

Rio Grande dams and diversions are structures that store water along the Rio Grande or its tributaries, or that divert water for use in irrigation. The first diversions were made by the Pueblo Indians over 1,000 years ago. More permanent diversions were built by the Spanish in New Mexico to feed acequias, or shared irrigation canals. The first dam to impound the Rio Grande was the Rio Grande Dam, completed in 1914, followed by the Elephant Butte Dam, completed in 1916.

== Projects ==
Several major projects have undertaken construction of dams and diversion in the Rio Grande basin.

The Rio Grande Project built the Elephant Butte Dam and the Caballo Dam. A number of diversion dams were also constructed in this project, including the Leasburg, Percha, Mesilla, American and Riverside diversion dams. The Middle Rio Grande Conservancy District built El Vado Dam and the Angostura, Isleta and San Acacia diversion dams. Rehabilitation of these dams, and construction of the Cochiti Dam were undertaken by the Middle Rio Grande Project. The San Juan–Chama Project brings water to the Rio Grande basin from the Colorado River Basin, building the Heron Dam to store some of the water, with an expansion of the El Vado Dam storing some of the remainder. The Closed Basin Project extracts groundwater from the San Luis Valley and delivers it into the Rio Grande.

== Pecos River ==
The Pecos River is the largest tributary of the Rio Grande, and several dams have been built along it. These include the Sumner Dam, Santa Rosa Dam, Brantley Dam, Avalon Dam and Red Bluff Dam.

== List of structures ==
Structures include:

Name	Complete	Owner	Capacity	Location
Closed Basin Project	early 1990s	Bureau of Reclamation	25,000 acre-feet annually	Field of salvage wells in the San Luis Valley, Colorado
Rio Grande Dam and Reservoir	1914	San Luis Valley Irrigation District	52,000 acre-feet	Near Creede, Colorado
Platoro Dam and Reservoir	1951	Bureau of Reclamation	59,570 acre-feet	Conejos River, Colorado
Heron Dam and Reservoir	1971	Bureau of Reclamation	399,980 acre-feet	Willow Creek at confluence with the Rio Chama
El Vado Dam and Reservoir	1935	Bureau of Reclamation	195,440 acre-feet	Rio Chama, New Mexico
Abiquiu Dam and Reservoir	1963	Corps of Engineers	1,192,800 acre-feet	Rio Chama, New Mexico
Cochiti Dam and Cochiti Lake	1973	Corps of Engineers	582,019 acre-feet	Sandoval County, New Mexico
Galisteo Dam and Reservoir	1970	Corps of Engineers	88,900 acre-feet	Galisteo Creek, New Mexico near confluence with the Middle Rio Grande
Jemez Canyon Dam and Reservoir	1953	Corps of Engineers	102,700 acre-feet	Confluence of Jemez River and the Middle Rio Grande, New Mexico
Angostura Diversion Dam	1934	MRGCD	650 cfs diversion	Middle Rio Grande, 5 miles upstream of Bernalillo, New Mexico
Isleta Diversion Dam	1934	MRGCD	1,070 cfs diversion	Middle Rio Grande, 13 mi south of Albuquerque, New Mexico
San Acacia Diversion Dam	1934	MRGCD	283 cfs diversion	Middle Rio Grande at San Acacia, New Mexico
Elephant Butte Dam and Reservoir	1916	Bureau of Reclamation	2,065,010 acre feet	Middle Rio Grande, 3.75 miles east of Truth or Consequences
Caballo Dam and Reservoir	1938	Bureau of Reclamation	331,510 acre-feet	Rio Grande, 17 miles downstream from Elephant Butte Dam
Percha Diversion Dam	1918	Bureau of Reclamation	350 cu ft/s diversion	1 mile (1.6 km) west of the Caballo Dam
Leasburg Diversion Dam	1907	Bureau of Reclamation		Rio Grande, 5 miles northwest of Las Cruces, New Mexico
Mesilla Diversion Dam	1916	Bureau of Reclamation	950 cu ft/s diversion	40 miles (64 km) upstream of El Paso
American Diversion Dam	1938	International Boundary & Water Commission	1,200 cu ft/s diversion	3.5 miles upstream from El Paso, Texas
International Diversion Dam	1918	International Boundary & Water Commission	60,000 acre feet / year	2 miles downstream from American Dam
Riverside Diversion Dam	1928	International Boundary & Water Commission	900 cu ft/sec diversion	14 miles downstream from American Dam
Amistad Dam	1968	International Boundary & Water Commission	5,100,000 acre-feet	Confluence of the Rio Grande and the Pecos River, Texas
Falcon Dam	1954	International Boundary & Water Commission	3,200,000 acre-feet	Between Starr County, Texas and Nueva Ciudad Guerrero, Tamaulipas
