= Rio Grande Project =

American irrigation project

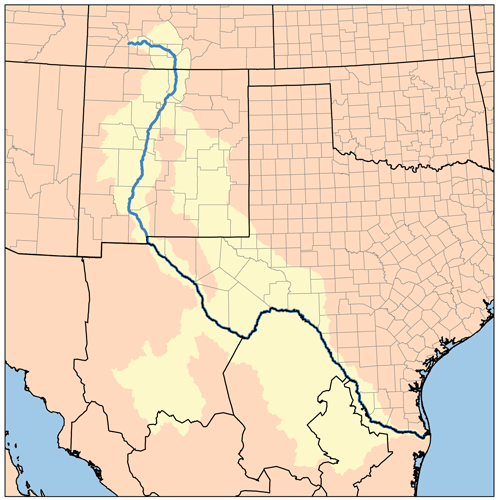
- Map of the Rio Grande drainage basin

General statistics
- Begun: 1905
- Completed: 1952
- Dams and reservoirs: Elephant Butte; Caballo; Percha (diversion); Leasburg (diversion); Mesilla (diversion); American (diversion); Riverside (diversion); Picacho North (flood control); Picacho South (flood control)
- Power plants: Elephant Butte (27.95 MW)
- Canals: 1,061 mi (1,708 km) (total); 596 mi (959 km) (irrigation); 465 mi (748 km) (drainage)

Operations
- Storage capacity: 2,453,413 acre⋅ft (3.026240 km^{3})
- Land irrigated: 193,000 acres (78,000 ha)
- Power plant capacity: 27.95 MW

The Rio Grande Project is a United States Bureau of Reclamation irrigation, hydroelectricity, flood control, and interbasin water transfer project serving the upper Rio Grande basin in the southwestern United States. The project irrigates 193,000 acres (780 km^{2}) along the river in the states of New Mexico and Texas. Approximately 60 percent of this land is in New Mexico. Some water is also allotted to Mexico to irrigate some 25,000 acres (100 km^{2}) on the south side of the river. The project was authorized in 1905, but its final features were not implemented until the early 1950s.

The project consists of two large storage dams, 6 small diversion dams, two flood-control dams, 596 miles (959 km) of canals and their branches and 465 miles (748 km) of drainage channels and pipes. A small hydroelectric plant at one of the project's dams also supplies electricity to the region.

== History ==
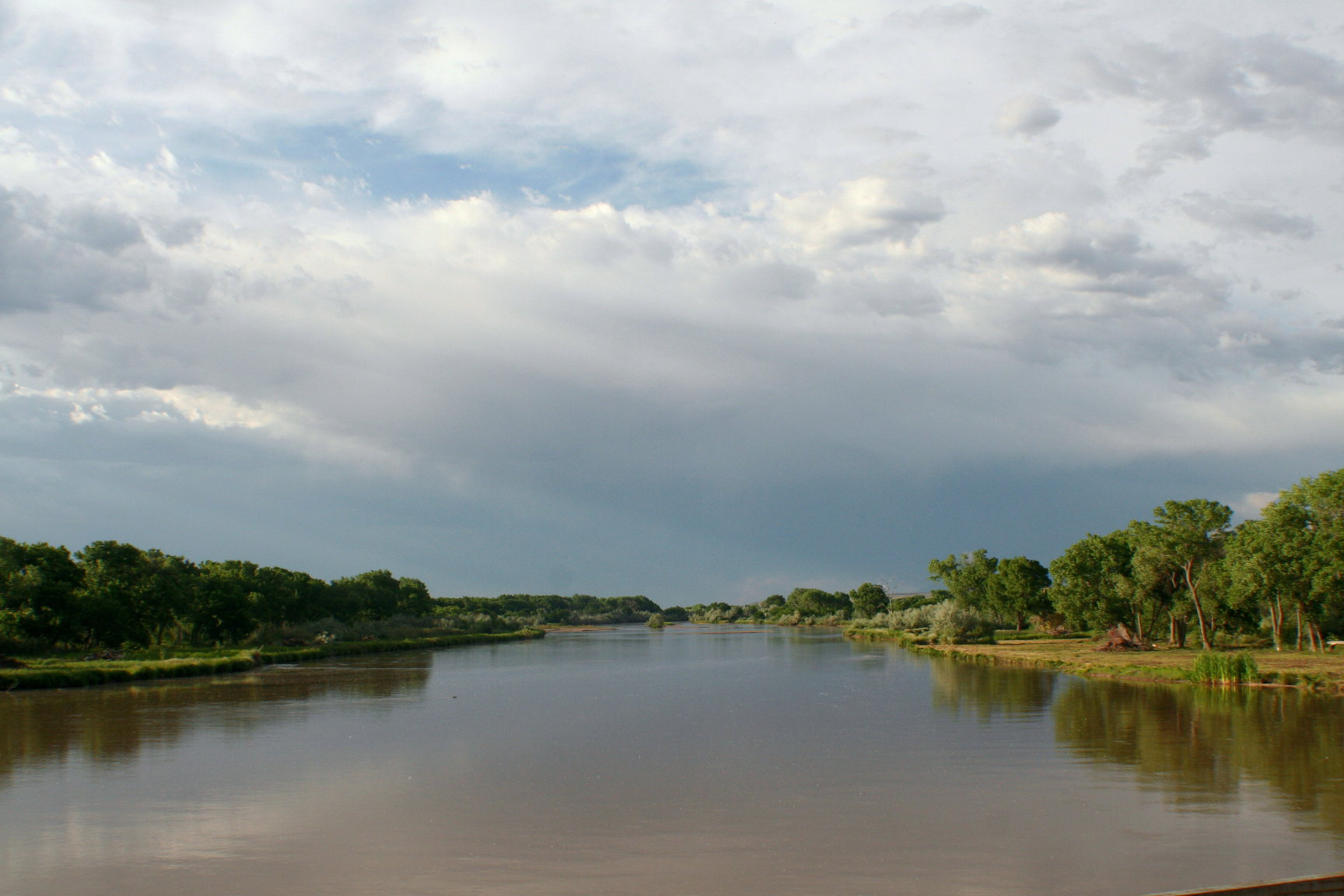
The Rio Grande in Isleta Pueblo, south of Albuquerque

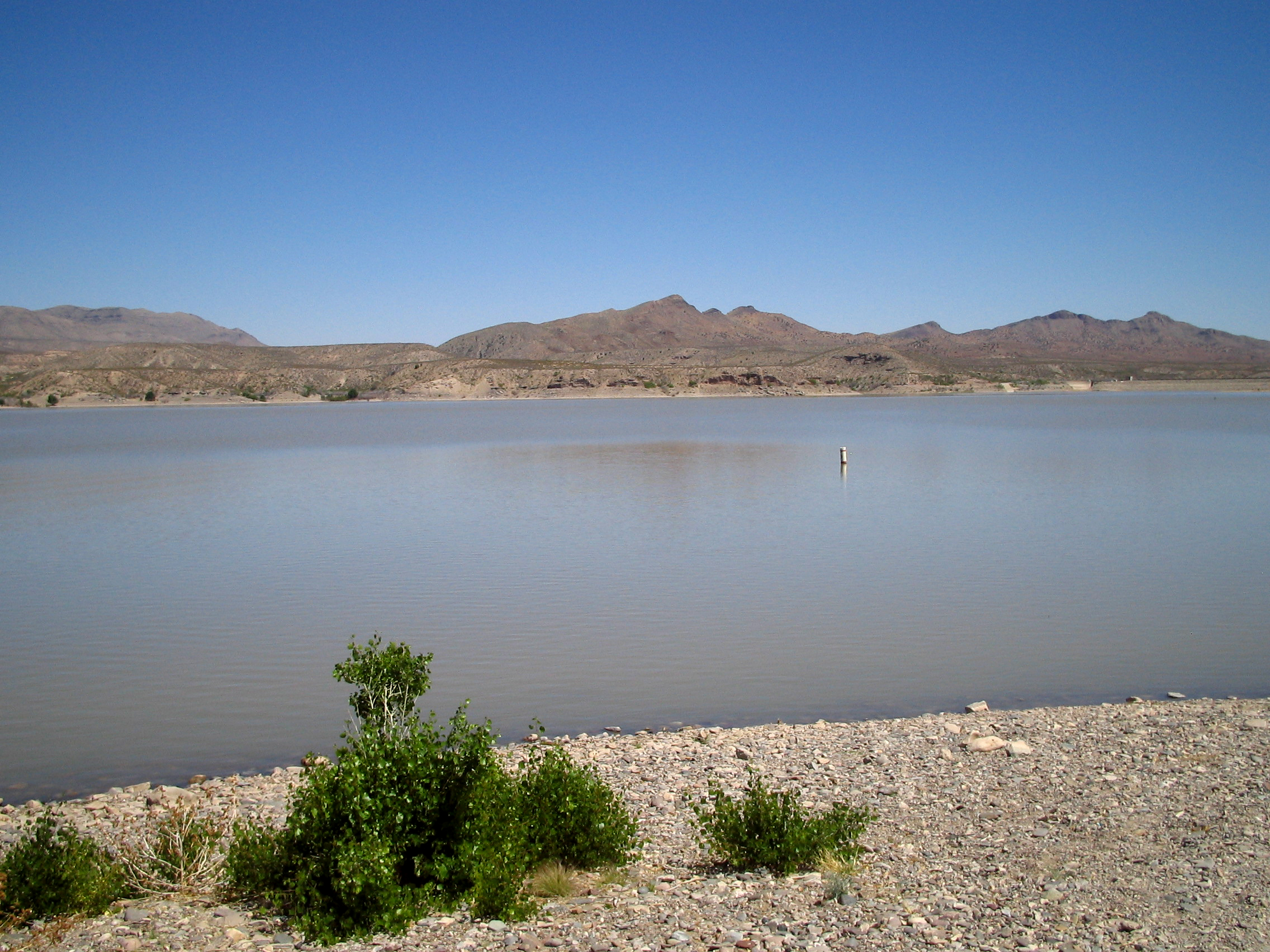
Caballo Lake, formed by Caballo Dam on the Rio Grande in southern New Mexico (between Hatch and Truth or Consequences)

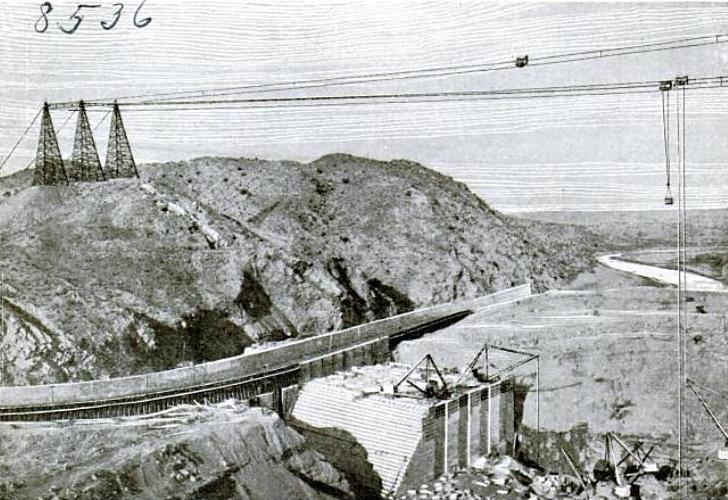
Elephant Butte Dam under construction in 1914

Long before Texas was a state, the Pueblo Indians used the waters of the Rio Grande with simple irrigation systems that were noted by the Spanish in the 16th century while conducting expeditions from Mexico to North America. In the mid-19th century, American settlers began intensive irrigation development of the Rio Grande watershed. Small dikes, dams, canals, and other irrigation works were constructed along the Rio Grande and its tributaries. The river would take out some of these primitive structures in its annual floods, and a large, coordinated project would be needed to construct permanent replacements. However, investigations to begin this project did not begin until the early twentieth century.

Like many rivers of the American Southwest, runoff in the Rio Grande basin is limited and varies widely from year to year. By the 1890s, water use in the upper basin was so great that the river's flow near El Paso, Texas, was reduced to a trickle in dry summers. To resolve these problems, plans were drafted up for a large storage dam at Elephant Butte, about 120 miles (190 km) downstream of Albuquerque, New Mexico. The Newlands Reclamation Act was passed in 1902, authorizing the Rio Grande Project as a Bureau of Reclamation undertaking. For the next two years, surveyors and engineers undertook a comprehensive feasibility study for the project's dams and reservoirs.

The first elements of the project to be built were the Leasburg Diversion Dam and about 6 miles (9.7 km) of supporting canal, begun in 1906 and finished in 1908. Elephant Butte Dam, the largest dam on the Rio Grande, was authorized by the United States Congress on February 15, 1905. Construction began in 1908, when groundworks were laid. Conflicts over the lands to be submerged under the future reservoir bogged down the project for a while, but work resumed in 1912 and the reservoir began to fill by 1915. The Franklin Canal was an existing 1890 canal purchased by the Bureau of Reclamation in 1912 and rebuilt from 1914 to 1915. The Mesilla and Percha Diversion Dams, East Side Canal, West Side Canal, Rincon Valley Canal, and an extension of the Leasburg Canal were built in the period between 1914 and 1919.

In the late 1910s, a problem developed with rising local groundwater levels caused by irrigation. In response, Reclamation began planning for the extensive 465-mile (748 km) drainage system of the Rio Grande Project in 1916. Contracts for the construction of these drainage systems, as well as distribution canals (laterals) were not awarded until the period from 1917 to 1918. Before 1929, the entire irrigation system would be overhauled. This involved repairing, rebuilding and extending old canals; and construction of new laterals. Work is still in progress, as agricultural development in the region continues to grow.

The last major components of the project were constructed from the 1930s to the early 1950s. Caballo Dam, the second major storage facility of the project located 21 miles south of Truth or Consequences, New Mexico was built from 1936 to 1938. Caballo was built to provide flood protection for the projects downstream, stabilize outflows from Elephant Butte, and replace storage lost in Elephant Butte Reservoir due to sedimentation. With the benefit of flow regulation, a small hydroelectric plant was completed in 1940 at the base of Elephant Butte Dam. The construction of power transmission lines was begun in 1940, and was finally completed by 1952.

The Elephant Butte Irrigation District is a 6,870 acres (27.8 km^{2}) historic district providing recognition and limited protection for the history of much of the system, which was listed on the National Register of Historic Places in 1997. The listing included three contributing buildings and 214 contributing structures. Noted as historic are the diversion dams and the unlined irrigation canals; most of the mechanical fixtures in the system have been routinely replaced and are non-historic.

== Components of the project ==
=== Elephant Butte Dam ===
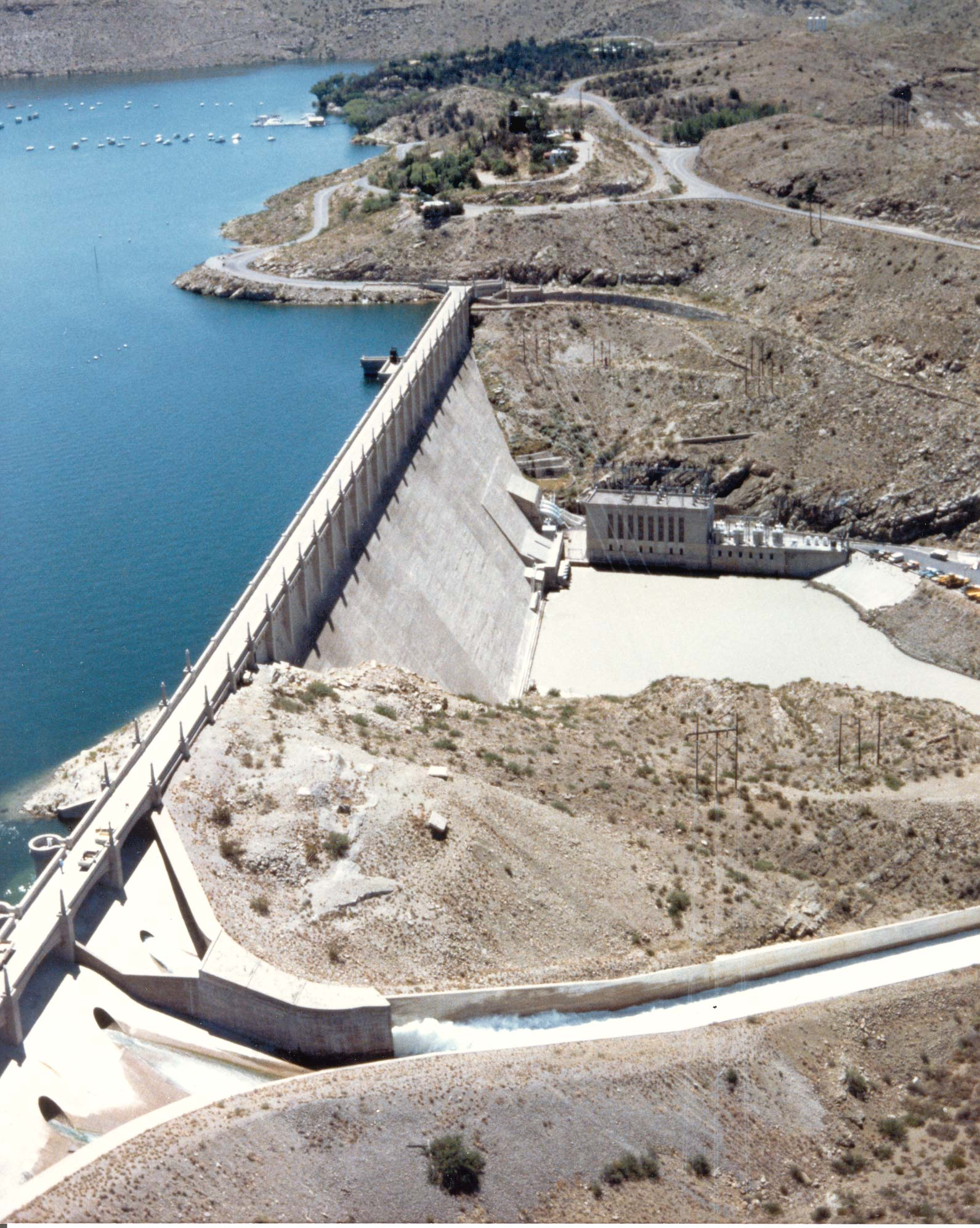
Elephant Butte Dam

The Elephant Butte Dam (also referred to as Elephant Butte Dike) is the main storage facility for the Rio Grande Project. It is a 1,674 ft (510 m) long concrete gravity dam standing 193 ft (59 m) above the river and 301 ft (92 m) high from its foundations. The dam is 228 feet (69 m) thick at the base and tapers to about 18 feet (5.5 m) thick at the crest. The dam took 629,500 cubic yards (481,300 m^{3}) of material to construct.

The full volume of Elephant Butte Reservoir is some 2,109,423 acre⋅ft (2.601935×10^{9} m^{3}), accounting for about 85% of the project's storage capacity. The outlet works of the dam can release 10,800 cu ft/s (310 m^{3}/s), while the service spillway can release 34,750 cu ft/s (984 m^{3}/s).

The reservoir and dam receive water from a catchment of 28,900 square miles (75,000 km^{2}), about 16% of the Rio Grande's total drainage area. The Elephant Butte hydroelectric station is a base load power plant that draws water from the reservoir and has a capacity of 27.95 megawatts.

=== Caballo Dam ===
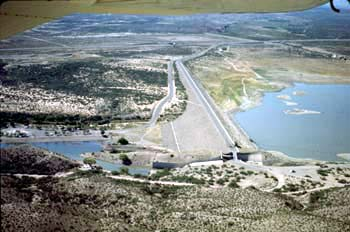
Caballo Dam

Caballo Dam is the second major storage dam of the Rio Grande Project, located about 25 miles (40 km) below Elephant Butte. The dam is 78 feet (24 m) high above the river, 96 feet (29 m) high from its foundations, and 4,558 feet (1,389 m) long. It forms the Caballo Reservoir, which can store up to 343,990 acre⋅ft (0.42431 km^{3}) of water.

The outlet works can release 5,000 cubic feet (140 m^{3}), while the spillway has a capacity of 33,200 cubic feet (940 m^{3}) per second. The dam has no power generation facilities, although it has been proposed that a small hydroelectric plant be installed at its base for local irrigation districts.

=== Percha Diversion Dam and Rincon Valley Main Canal ===
Percha Diversion Dam lies downstream from and 1 mile (1.6 km) west of the Caballo Dam. It consists of a concrete overflow section flanked by earthen wing dikes totaling 2,489 ft (759 m) in length, standing 19 feet (5.8 m) high above the riverbed and 29 feet (8.8 m) above its foundations. The dam diverts water into the Rincon Valley Main Canal, which is 28.1 miles (45.2 km) long and has a capacity of 350 cu ft/s (9.9 m^{3}/s). Water from the canal irrigates 16,260 acres (6,580 ha) of land in the Rincon Valley.

=== Leasburg Diversion Dam and Canal ===
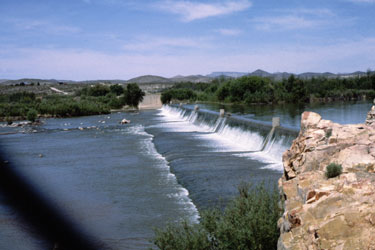
Leasburg Diversion Dam

Leasburg Diversion Dam is downstream and nearly identical in design to the Percha Diversion Dam. It is 7 feet (2.1 m) high above the river and 10 feet (3.0 m) high above its foundations. The dam and adjacent dikes total 3,922.3 feet (1,195.5 m) in length. The dam's spillway is a broad-crested weir about 600 feet (180 m) long with a capacity of 17,000 cu ft/s (480 m^{3}/s). The dam diverts water into the 13.7-mile (22.0 km) Leasburg Canal, which irrigates 31,600 acres (12,800 ha) of land in the upper Mesilla Valley. The canal has a capacity of 625 cubic feet (17.7 m^{3}) per second.

=== Pichacho North and South Dams ===
Pichacho North and Pichacho South dams impound North Pichacho Arroyo and South Pichacho Arroyo, respectively, to provide flood protection for the Leasburg Canal. Both arroyos are ephemeral, and so the dams operate only during storm events. The dams were both built in the 1950s.

- Pichacho North is an earthfill dam 38 feet (12 m) high above the streambed, 41 feet (12 m) high above its foundations, and 1,610 feet (490 m) long. It has an uncontrolled crest spillway that is 200 feet (61 m) long. It controls floods from a drainage area of 11 square miles (28 km^{2}).
- Pichacho South stands 26 feet (7.9 m) high above the arroyo and 30 feet (9.1 m) from its foundations. The dam is 3,945 feet (1,202 m) long. Its spillway is of similar design to that of North Pichacho, and is 100 feet (30 m) long. The dam provides flood protection for an area of 6 square miles (16 km^{2}).

=== Mesilla Diversion Dam and Canals ===
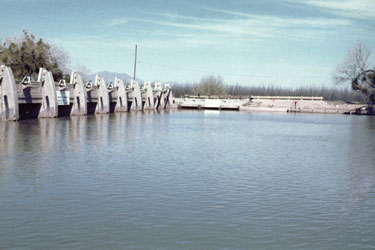
Mesilla Diversion Dam, upstream side. The headworks of one of the canals are visible in the center.

The Mesilla Diversion Dam is located about 40 miles (64 km) upstream of El Paso and consists of a gated overflow structure. The dam is 10 feet (3.0 m) high above the Rio Grande, 22 feet (6.7 m) high above its foundations, and measures 303 feet (92 m) long. The spillway has a capacity of 15,000 cu ft/s (420 m^{3}/s). The dam diverts water into the East Side Canal and West Side Canal, which provide irrigation water to 53,650 acres (21,710 ha) of land in the lower Mesilla Valley. The East Side Canal is 13.5 miles (21.7 km) long, and has a capacity of 300 cu ft/s (8.5 m^{3}/s). The West Side Canal is larger at 23.4 miles (37.7 km) long, and has a capacity of 650 cu ft/s (18 m^{3}/s). Near its end, the West Side Canal crosses underneath the Rio Grande via the Montoya Siphon.

=== American Diversion Dam and Canals ===
The American Diversion Dam is a gated dam flanked by earthen dikes about 2 miles (3.2 km) northwest of El Paso and just above the Mexico–United States border. It is 5 feet (1.5 m) high above the riverbed, and 18 feet (5.5 m) from crest to foundation. The spillway is 286 feet (87 m) long and has a capacity of 12,000 cu ft/s (340 m^{3}/s). The dam diverts water into the American Canal, which carries up to 1,200 cubic feet per second (34 m^{3}/s) of water for 2.1 miles (3.4 km) to the beginning of the Franklin Canal. The Franklin Canal is 28.4 miles (45.7 km) long and takes water into the El Paso Valle, where it irrigates 17,000 acres (69 km^{2}).

=== Riverside Diversion Dam and Canals ===
Riverside Diversion Dam is the lowermost dam of the Rio Grande Project. The dam is 8 feet (2.4 m) above the streambed, 17.5 feet (5.3 m) above its foundations, and 267 feet (81 m) long. Its service spillway consists of six 16 ft × 8.17 ft (4.88 m × 2.49 m) radial gates, and an uncontrolled overflow weir serves as an emergency spillway. The Riverside Canal carries water 17.2 miles (27.7 km) to the El Paso Valley, and has a capacity of about 900 cu ft/s (25 m^{3}/s). The Tornillo Canal, with a capacity of 325 cu ft/s (9.2 m^{3}/s), branches 12 miles (19 km) off the Riverside Canal. Excess waters from the canals are diverted to irrigate about 18,000 acres (7,300 ha) in Hudspeth County, Texas.

== Effects ==
=== Benefits ===
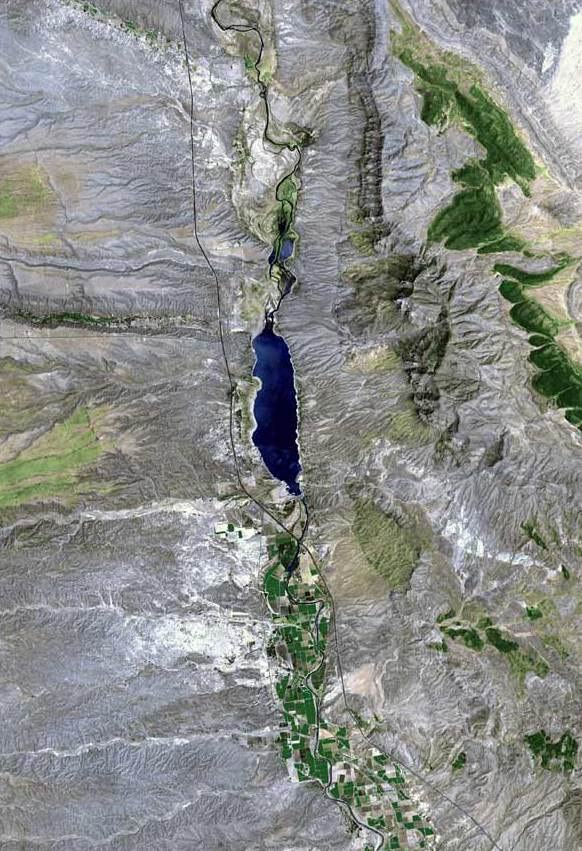
Aerial view of Caballo Lake and irrigated lands along the Rio Grande Valley

The Rio Grande Project furnishes irrigation water year-round to a long, narrow area of 178,000 acres (72,000 ha) in the Rio Grande Valley in south-central New Mexico and western Texas. Crops grown in the region include grain, pecans, alfalfa, cotton, and many types of vegetables. Power generated at the Elephant Butte power plant is distributed through an electrical grid totaling 490 miles (790 km) of 115-kilovolt transmission lines and 11 substations. Originally built by Reclamation, the power grid remained under its ownership until 1977, when it was sold to a local company.

Caballo and Elephant Butte reservoirs are both popular recreational areas. Elephant Butte Reservoir, with 36,897 acres (149.32 km^{2}) of water at full pool, is popular for swimming, boating, and fishing. Cabins, fishing tackle, and boat rental services are available at the reservoir. Downstream Caballo Reservoir, with an area of 11,500 acres (47 km^{2}), is also a popular site for picnicking, fishing and boating. Elephant Butte Lake State Park and Caballo Lake State Park serve the two reservoirs, respectively.

=== Negative impacts ===
Even before the Rio Grande Project, the waters of the Rio Grande were already overtaxed by human development in the region. At the end of the 19th century, there were some 925 diversions of the river in the state of Colorado alone. In 1896, it was affirmed by the United States Geological Survey (USGS) that the river's flow was decreasing by 200,000 acre-feet (250,000,000 m^{3}) annually. The river has run dry many times since the 1950s at Big Bend National Park. At El Paso, Texas, the river is non-existent for much of the year. Tributaries of the river, both on the Mexican and American sides, have been diverted heavily for irrigation. The Rio Grande is said to be "one of the most stressed river basins in the world". In 2001, the river failed to reach the Gulf of Mexico but instead ended 500 feet (150 m) from the shore behind a sandbar, "not with a roar but with a whimper in the sand".

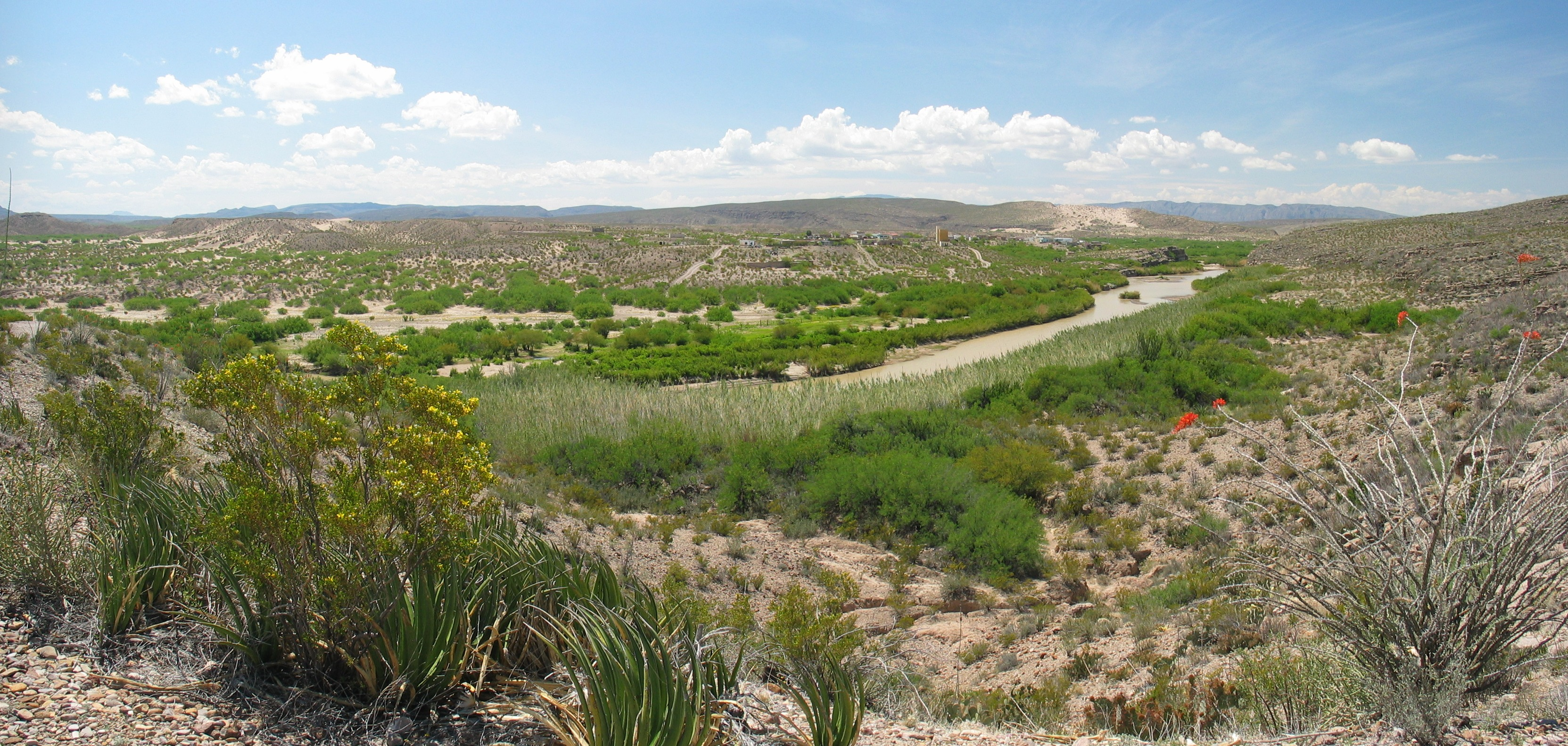
The river forms the border of the USA (foreground) and Mexico (background). However, the diminished flow, evident in the photo, has made it easier for illegal immigrants to cross the border.

The river's decreasing flow has posed problems for international security. In the past, the river was wide, deep and fast-flowing in its section through Texas, where it forms a large section of the Mexico–United States border. Illegal immigrants once had to swim across the river at the border, but with the river so low immigrants need only wade across for most of the year. Other than extensive diversions, exotic introduced, fast-growing and water-consuming plants, such as water hyacinth and hydrilla, are also leading to reduced flows. The United States government has recently attempted to slow or stop the progress of these weeds by introducing insects and fish that feed on the invasive plants.

== See also ==
- Colorado River Storage Project
- Rio Grande Rectification Project
- Rio Grande dams and diversions
