= Mesilla Diversion Dam =

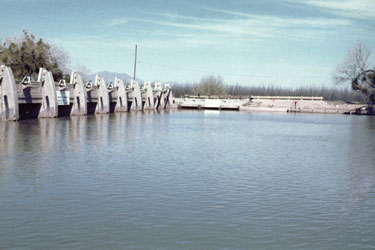
- Mesilla Diversion Dam, upstream side. The headworks of one of the canals are visible in the center

- Location within New Mexico Location within the United States
- Country: United States
- Location: Doña Ana County, New Mexico
- Coordinates: 32.227918°N 106.798308°W
- Purpose: Irrigation
- Owner: United States Bureau of Reclamation

Dam and spillways
- Type of dam: Diversion dam
- Height: 22 feet (6.7 m)
- Elevation at crest: 3,819 feet (1,164 m)
- Width (crest): 303 feet (92 m)
- Spillways: 3

The Mesilla Diversion Dam is located in the Rio Grande about 40 miles (64 km) upstream of El Paso, Texas, about 6 miles (9.7 km) to the south of Las Cruces, New Mexico. It diverts water from the river for irrigation in the lower Mesilla Valley. The dam is owned by the United States Bureau of Reclamation, which built it, and is operated by the Elephant Butte Irrigation District.

== Background ==
The first small canals in the Mesilla Valley were dug in 1841, and more canals were dug after 1848, when Mexico ceded the region to the United States. By 1897, there were five main canals, all north of Chamberino. In 1908, the Leasburg Diversion Dam was completed. Water flow was still unpredictable, with the river often drying up for several months. This changed with the closure of Elephant Butte Dam in 1915, which regulated the flow.

The Mesilla Diversion Dam was completed in 1916.

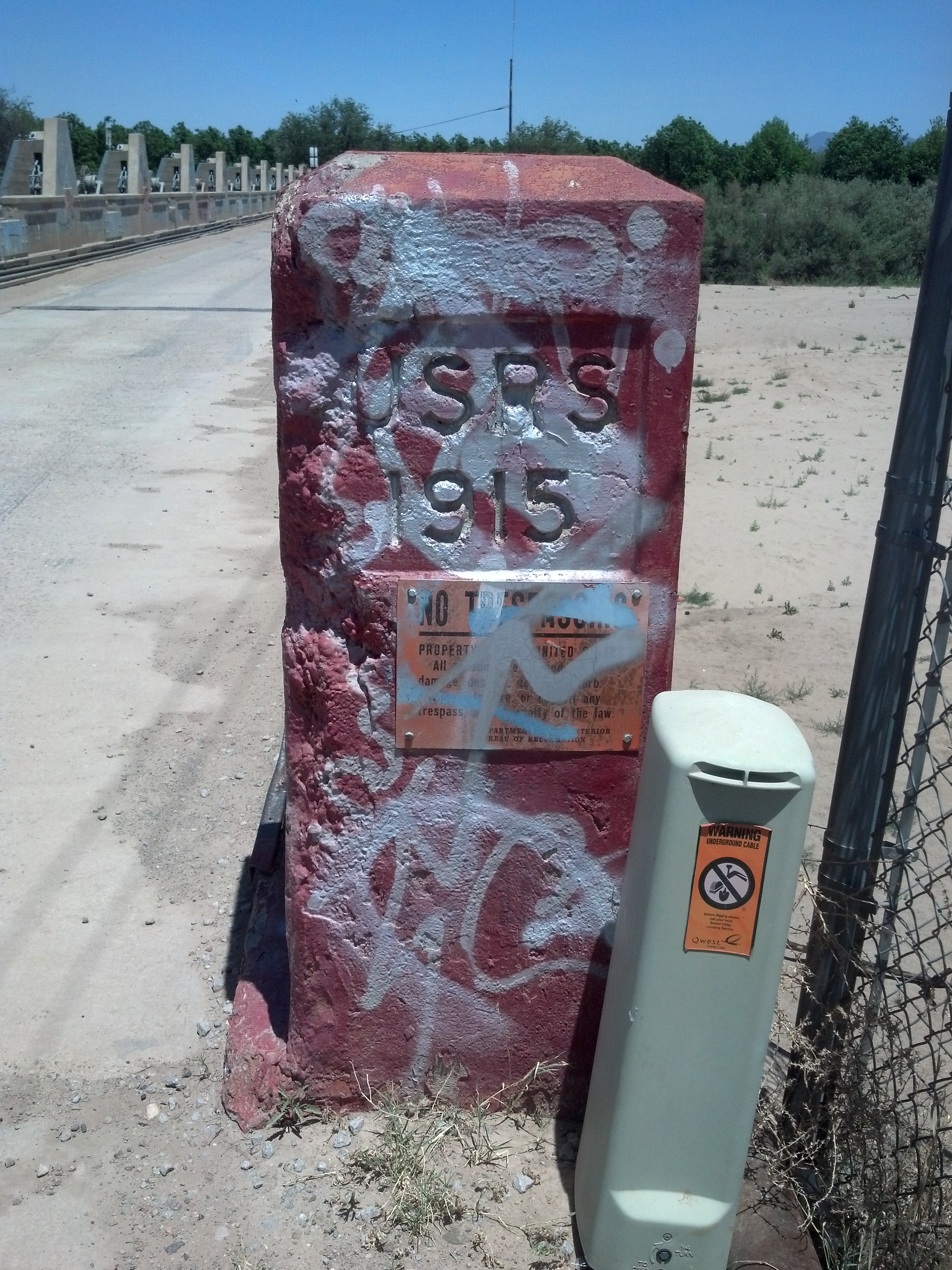
End of concrete railing wall on the west (downstream) end of the dam

By this time, the canal system had served the entire valley.

== Structure ==
The dam was built as part of the Rio Grande Project. The dam was completed in 1916, and the crest was raised by 1.66 feet (0.51 m) in 1940. The weir crest is 3,819 feet (1,164 m) above sea level. It consists of a low concrete weir with radial gates flanked by levees. The dam has a structural height of 22 feet (6.7 m) and a hydraulic height of 10 feet (3.0 m). The weir crest length is 303 feet (92 m).

The west side spillway has nine radial gates, each 21.58 by 6 feet (6.58 by 1.83 m). The east side spillway has four radial gates, each 21.58 by 8.42 feet (6.58 by 2.57 m). The main spillway has a capacity of 715,000 cubic feet (20,200 m^{3}) per second.

== Canals ==
The dam diverts water into the East Side Canal and West Side Canal, which provide irrigation water to 53,650 acres (21,710 ha) of land in the lower Mesilla Valley. The East Side Canal is 13.5 miles (21.7 km) long and has a capacity of 300 cu ft/s (8.5 m^{3}/s). The West Side Canal is larger at 23.4 miles (37.7 km) long and has a capacity of 650 cu ft/s (18 m^{3}/s). Near its end, the West Side Canal crosses underneath the Rio Grande via the Montoya Siphon.
