= Franklin Canal =

Franklin Canal may refer to:

- Franklin Canal (Texas), an irrigation canal
- Franklin Canal Company, who built the Erie to Cleveland railroad, later the Lake Shore and Michigan Southern Railway
