= Riverside Diversion Dam =

- Location within Texas
- Country: United States
- Location: El Paso, Texas
- Coordinates: 31.658151°N 106.330139°W
- Purpose: Irrigation
- Opening date: 1928
- Demolition date: 1987
- Owner: Bureau of Reclamation

Dam and spillways
- Type of dam: Diversion dam
- Elevation at crest: 3,621 feet (1,104 m)
- Width (crest): 267 feet (81 m)

The Riverside Diversion Dam (or simply the Riverside Dam) was a diversion dam on the Rio Grande to the southeast of El Paso, Texas. The dam was owned by the United States Bureau of Reclamation, and diverted water into the Riverside Canal for use in irrigation in the El Paso Valley. The dam became obsolete with completion of a cement-lined canal carrying water from the upstream American Diversion Dam to the head of the canal. It was partially removed in 2003.

== Construction ==
The 21 May 1906 treaty between the United States and Mexico for "an equitable distribution of the waters of the Rio Grande" guaranteed Mexico up to 60,000 acre-feet (74,000,000 m^{3}) annually, with the Americans taking the rest, except in time of drought when the shares would be reduced on a percentage basis. The Mexicans would withdraw their water from the Rio Grande at the Acequia Madre about 2 miles (3.2 km) downstream from the point where the river starts to form the international border.

Riverside Diversion Dam was the lowermost dam of the Rio Grande Project, downstream from the Mexican dam. The dam, completed in 1928, was a concrete weir with radial gates, located on the Rio Grande about 15 miles (24 km) southeast of El Paso. It had a structural height of 17.5 feet (5.3 m) and a hydraulic height of 8 feet (2.4 m), with a weir crest length of 267 feet (81 m). The crest elevation was 3,621 feet (1,104 m) The spillway had six radial gates, each 16 by 8.17 feet (4.88 by 2.49 m), with an overflow weir for excess water.

The dam could deliver 11,000 cubic feet per second (310 m^{3}/s) downstream and could divert 900 cubic feet per second (25 m^{3}/s) into the Riverside Canal headworks through 5 radial gates, each 16 by 6 feet (4.9 by 1.8 m). On average the El Paso County diverted 194,387 acre-feet (239,773,000 m^{3}) into the Riverside Diversion Dam / Riverside Canal each year between 1928 and 1998.

== American dam and canal ==
To ensure that they got their agreed share of Rio Grande water, in 1935 Congress authorized construction of the American Dam, which measures the Mexican portion before it reached the international border and lets it continue along the river to the International Dam, while diverting the rest along the new 2 miles (3.2 km) long American Canal to the Franklin Canal, used to irrigate the 90 miles (140 km) long El Paso valley. Between 1997 and 1998 a cement-lined extension to the American Canal replaced part of the earthen Franklin Canal. The Rio Grande American Canal Extension fed water into the Riverside Canal near to the dam.

== Failure and removal ==
The Riverside Diversion Dam failed on 9 June 1987 due to flooding in the Rio Grande. With completion of the Rio Grande American Canal Extension, there was little need to rebuild the dam. In September 2003 the Socorro Field Division of the Bureau of Reclamation removed part of the failed diversion dam and coffer dam to improve flood control capability in the Rio Grande. The project required coordination between the Bureau of Reclamation, International Boundary and Water Commission and El Paso County Water and Improvement District No. 1.
