= Texas Irrigation Canals =

U.S. state water canal networks

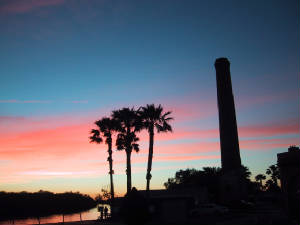
The First Lift Station in Mission in the Rio Grande Valley became a Texas Historic Landmark in 1985.

Texas has many irrigation canals with the majority of large canal networks in the Rio Grande Valley and the Gulf Coast, though smaller systems are located throughout the state. Canals provide water to dry climates to irrigate crops.

== Rio Grande Valley Canals ==
=== El Paso area canals (upper Rio Grande valley) ===
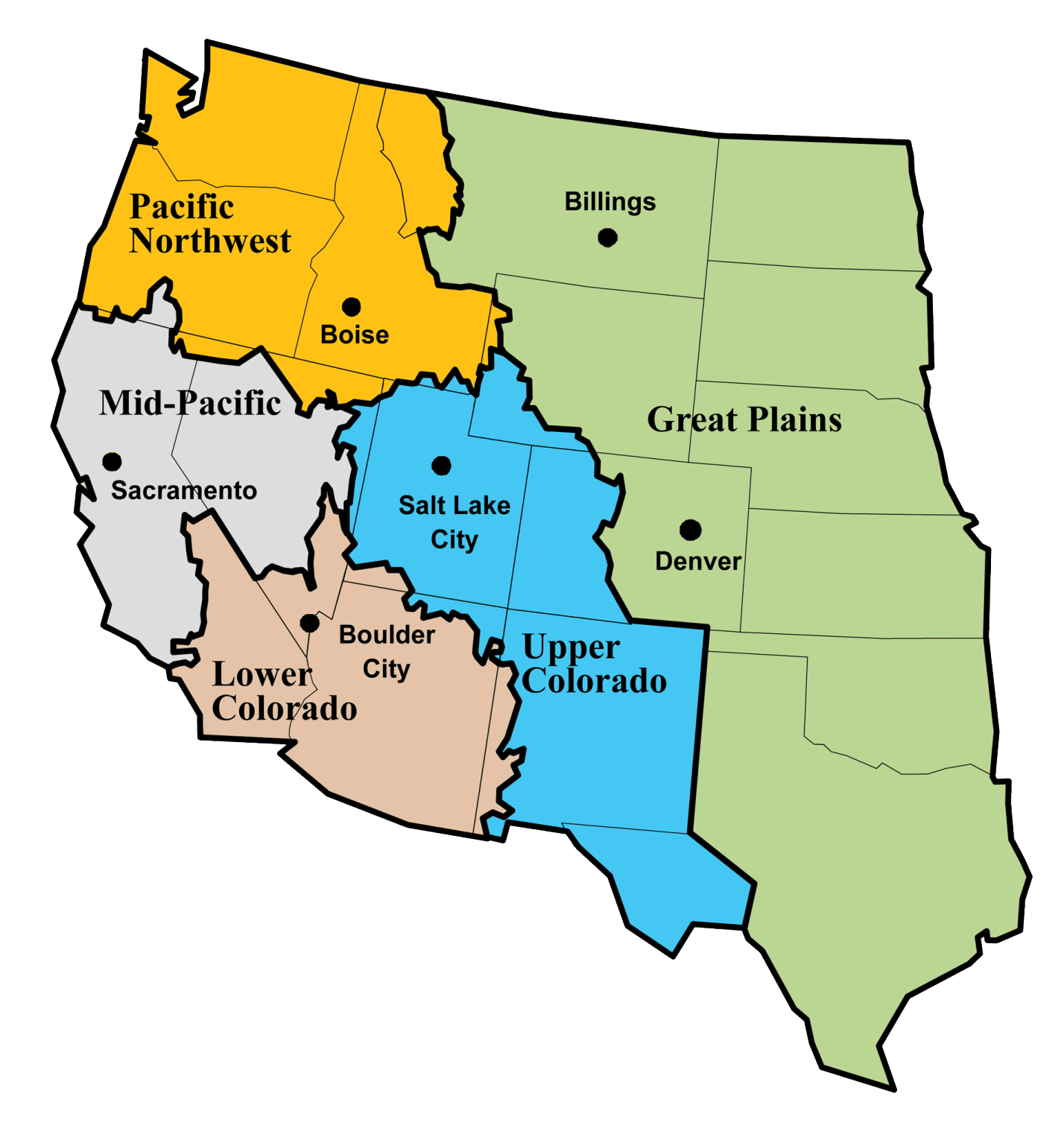
The upper valley canals are in the southern part of the Upper Colorado Region

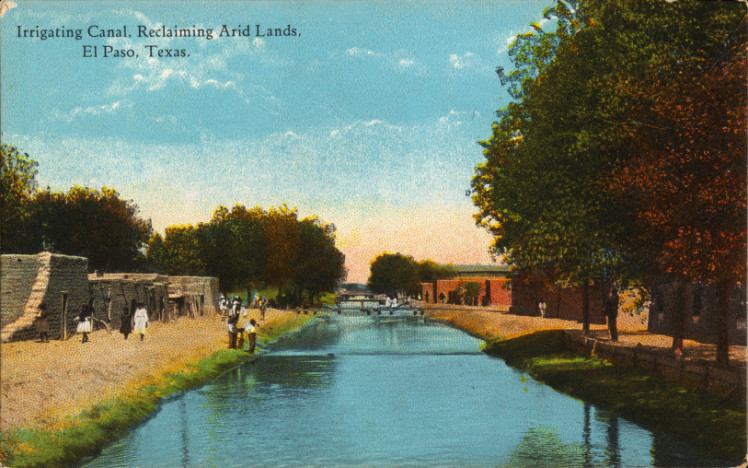
Irrigating canal, El Paso, Texas (postcard, circa 1908)

One large canal system in Texas is located along the Rio Grande near El Paso. The canal system begins at the American Diversion Dam on the Texas–New Mexico–Mexico border; it moves water into the American Canal on the U.S. side of the Rio Grande. This canal runs along the Rio Grande through the city of El Paso. Downstream from El Paso, the canal begins to divide into smaller canals (including the Franklin Canal) used to irrigate a great amount of the upper Rio Grande valley (El Paso and Hudspeth county water districts). The network is managed by the US Bureau of Reclamation. The major canals in this network are the Riverside Canal (El Paso), American Canal, and the Franklin Canal. A similar canal system exists on the Mexican side of the river, beginning in Ciudad Juárez, Chihuahua.

=== Eagle Pass canals ===
A canal system had been planned in Eagle Pass since 1885, when rancher Patrick W. Thompson drew up plans for an irrigation canal network. Construction on the project commenced in 1889. Progress was stopped due to a lack of funding after only three miles of canal were built. Construction on the project did not begin again until 1926, when Capt. W. A. Fitch pushed for construction. The canal began operation in 1932, and in the early 1970s, the main canal ran 108 miles (174 km). Onions and figs were among the first crops grown here.

=== Lower Rio Grande valley canals ===
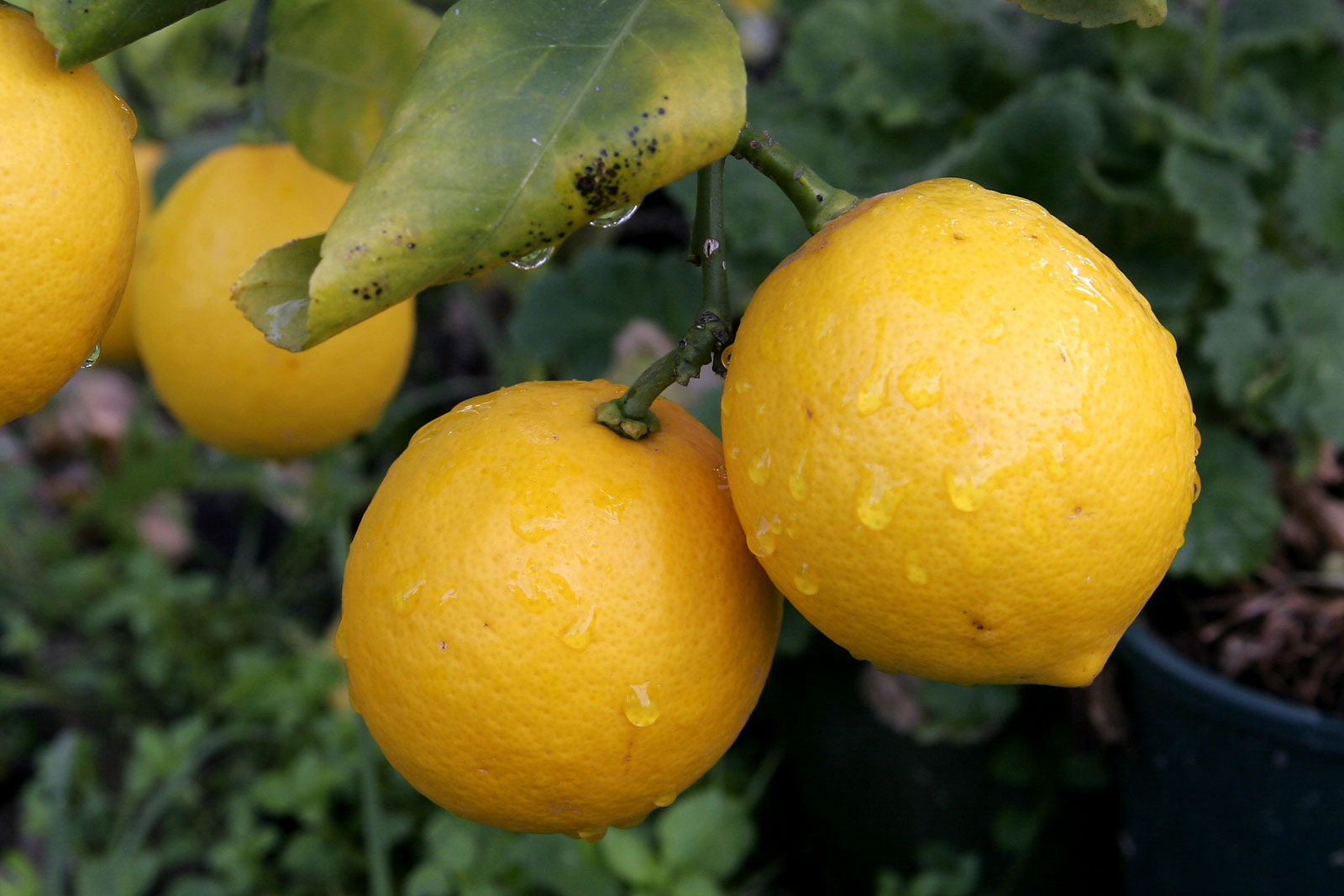
Citrus is among the foods grown in the lower Rio Grande valley

A large canal system is located in the lower Rio Grande valley, at the southernmost tip of Texas. The area is covered by 25 water districts, stretching three counties. The tropical climate of this area provides ideal conditions for growing citrus fruits, watermelons, and many other fruits and vegetables. It is the state's primary growing area for many crops, including citrus.

== Texas Colorado River canals ==
Another large system of canals in Texas is located on the Colorado River (not connected to the other Colorado River) in the Gulf Coast region. The canal network of 1,100 miles (1,800 km) is managed by the Lower Colorado River Authority (LCRA) and provides water to farm a region with inadequate and unreliable rainfall. Texas produces 7% of the nation's rice, and the majority of this rice is grown along the Colorado River. Nine pumping stations provide water to the canals. The network covers up to 91,500 acres (370 km^{2}) in Colorado, Matagorda, and Wharton Counties.

== Phantom Lake Canal ==
The Phantom Lake Canal is a canal in West Texas. The canal is used for irrigating vineyards, orchards, and other crops. The excess water in the canal feeds Lake Balmorhea. (Also See Balmorhea Canals)

== Balmorhea canals ==
The Balmorhea canal system acquires water from San Solomon Springs and transports it to nearby farms for irrigation. The water leaves the San Solomon Springs swimming pool in Balmorhea State Park in one large canal. The canal begins to divide after it leaves the park.

== East Texas canals ==
The canals in East Texas serve several purposes including delivery of water to farms throughout the area. There are many separate canals, most of them located to the East of Houston and the West of Beaumont. The canals are often mistaken for drainage ditches, which are very common in the area. The canals can usually be identified by several characteristics:

- The water level is above or close to ground level, and may have berms
- Usually straight with occasional turns as opposed to naturally flowing streams
- May have locks or valves to control water

Although the canals are mostly located in remote areas, they can be seen from I-10 in certain places, both following and crossing the highway. Other major highway canal crossings include US 90, US 69, US 96, and US 287 in Beaumont and the surrounding areas.

=== Gulf Coast Water Authority ===
The Gulf Coast Water Authority operates several canals. The American Canal and Briscoe Canal systems were originally built to provide irrigation for rice and sugar cane farming in Brazoria, Fort Bend, and Galveston counties. Now they also supply municipal and industrial customers. The canals are fed by natural water from Oyster Creek augmented with water the GCWA pumps out of the Brazos River three miles south of Fulshear.

=== Lower Neches Valley Authority ===
A large portion of the canals in Southeast Texas are owned and operated by the Lower Neches Valley Authority. The LNVA, the second river district created by the state of Texas, is currently one of 23 river districts in the state. The Lower Neches Valley Authority was granted authority by the Texas legislature in 1933 to operate within Hardin, Jefferson, and Tyler counties and eastern Chambers and Liberty counties. The LNVA system includes 400 miles of canals covering a 700 square mile area. The canals deliver fresh water to "...eight cities and water districts, 26 industries, and over 100 irrigated farms..." Water is drawn from the lower Neches River and Pine Island Bayou in north Beaumont with 21 large pumps delivering between 20,000 and 110,000 gallons of water a minute with a capability of delivering over one billion gallons of water a day.

A permanent saltwater barrier across the Neches River is located downstream of confluence of Pine Island Bayou and the Neches River within one-half mile of the confluence point. The barrier, constructed between 2000 and 2003, prevents saltwater contamination during periods of low river flows. The permanent saltwater barrier project had a budgeted cost of $50 million with the federal government paying 75% of the cost and the LNVA responsible for the remaining 25%. The barrier, over 1,000 feet long, includes a 650 foot long overflow barrier; five forty-five foot wide tainter gates; and a fifty-six foot wide navigation lane regulated by two thirty foot sector gates. Temporary barriers were installed across Pine Island Bayou and the Neches River upstream of the confluence 36 times between 1940 and 2000 prior to construction of the permanent barrier.

=== Sabine River Authority ===
The Sabine River Authority John W. Simmons Gulf Coast Canal System provides water for irrigation as well as industrial and municipal purposes. The system includes 75 miles of canals originating at the Sabine River nine miles north of Orange, Texas. Pumps can deliver more than 360 million gallons of water per day.
