= International Diversion Dam =

- Location within Mexico
- Country: Mexico
- Location: Ciudad Juárez, Chihuahua, Mexico
- Coordinates: 31.761022°N 106.509752°W
- Purpose: Irrigation

Dam and spillways
- Type of dam: Diversion dam

The International Diversion Dam (or simply the International Dam) is a diversion dam on the Rio Grande in Ciudad Juárez. The dam is operated by the International Boundary and Water Commission, and diverts water into the Acequia Madre for use in irrigation in Mexico. Water is diverted under the terms of the 1906 treaty on usage of Rio Grande water between the United States and Mexico.

== Origins ==
The dam has its origins in the 21 May 1906 treaty between the United States and Mexico for "an equitable distribution of the waters of the Rio Grande." This guaranteed Mexico up to 60,000 acre-feet (74,000,000 m^{3}) annually, with the Americans taking the rest, except in time of drought when the shares would be reduced on a percentage basis. The Mexicans would withdraw their water from the Rio Grande at the Acequia Madre about 2 miles (3.2 km) downstream from the point where the river starts to form the international border. The International Dam at the head of the Acequia Madre was completed in 1918, and improvements to the dam were completed in 1941.

== American Dam ==
To ensure that they got their agreed share, in 1935 Congress authorized construction of the American Dam, which measures the Mexican portion before it reached the international border and lets it continue along the river to the International Dam, while diverting the rest along the new 2 miles (3.2 km) long American Canal to the Franklin Canal, used to irrigate the 90 miles (140 km) long El Paso valley. The International Dam is about 2 miles (3.2 km) below the American dam, and diverts water for the Mexican side of the El Paso Valley, usually called the Valle de Juarez. Beyond the ruins at Fort Quitman the Rio Grande riverbed is often dry until the confluence of the Rio Conchos.

== Future possibilities ==
The dam is part of the Rio Grande Rectification Project. Between 1997 and 1998 a cement-lined extension to the American Canal replaced part of the earthen Franklin Canal, which delivered water through the City of El Paso to farms in El Paso’s Lower Valley. During planning for the extension, the Mexicans expressed interest in having their 60,000 acre-feet (74,000,000 m^{3}) allotment delivered from the end of the RGACE near Riverside Dam, rather than to the International Dam at the head of the Acequia Madre, as at present. The water would be delivered via a siphon underneath the Rio Grande.
