= American Dam =

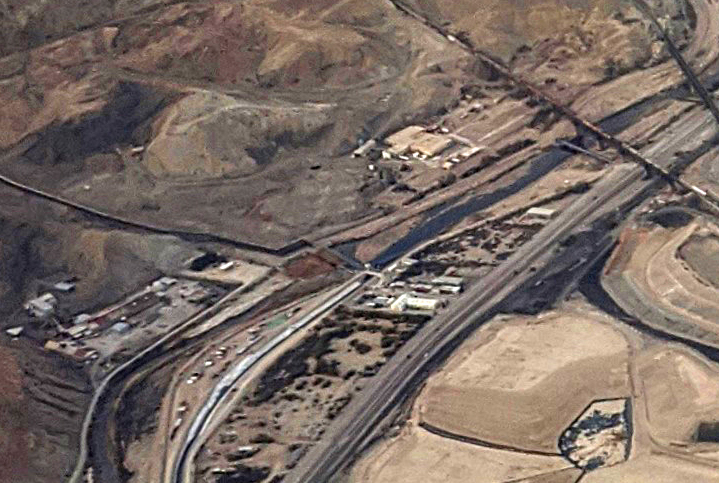
- American Dam (center)

- Location within Texas
- Country: United States
- Location: El Paso, Texas / Sunland Park, New Mexico
- Coordinates: 31.784234°N 106.527845°W
- Purpose: Irrigation
- Opening date: 1938

Dam and spillways
- Type of dam: Diversion dam
- Height: 5 feet (1.5 m)
- Height (foundation): 18 feet (5.5 m)
- Length: 284 feet (87 m)
- Elevation at crest: 3,684 feet (1,123 m)

The American Dam, or American Diversion Dam, is a diversion dam on the Rio Grande in El Paso, Texas, that divides the river water between Mexico and the U.S. It is about 140 feet (43 m) north of the point where the west bank of the river enters Mexico, 3.5 miles (5.6 km) from the business center. The dam is operated by the International Boundary and Water Commission. It started operation in 1938.

== Origins ==
The dam has its origins in the 21 May 1906 treaty between the United States and Mexico for "an equitable distribution of the waters of the Rio Grande." This guaranteed Mexico up to 60,000 acre-feet (74,000,000 m^{3}) annually, with the Americans taking the rest, except in time of drought when the shares would be reduced on a percentage basis. The Mexicans would withdraw their water from the Rio Grande at the Acequia Madre in Ciudad Juárez about 2 miles (3.2 km) downstream from the point where the river starts to form the international border.

To ensure that they got their agreed share, in 1935 Congress authorized construction of the American Dam, which measures the Mexican portion before it reached the international border and lets it continue along the river to the Acequia Madre, while diverting the rest along the new 2 miles (3.2 km) long American Canal to the Franklin Canal, used to irrigate the 90 miles (140 km) long El Paso valley.

== Location ==
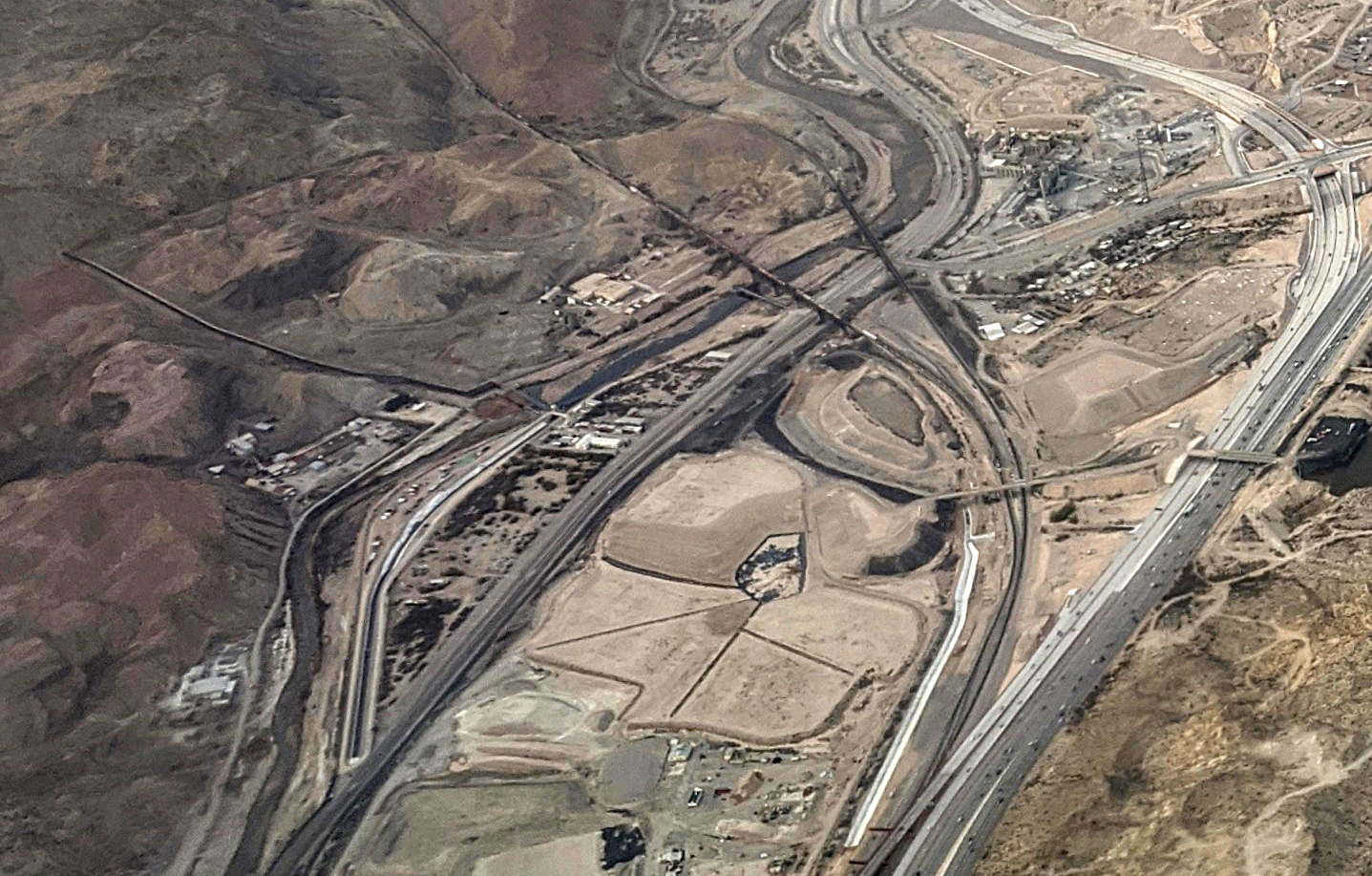
Aerial view, from the southeast, of the corner of Texas, New Mexico, and Mexico, with the Rio Grande, American Dam, American Canal, and abandoned Smeltertown site, and the old Asarco smelter area. The dam site is below the two railroad bridges over the river. The American Dam Headquarters building (white, center) is in the abandoned Smeltertown neighborhood. A section of border wall privately constructed in 2019 is visible extending west from the dam.

The dam is part of the Rio Grande Project. It marks the end of the Mesilla Valley section, which starts at the Leasburg Diversion Dam 63 miles (101 km) upstream, and marks the beginning of the El Paso Valley section, which extends downstream for another 46 miles (74 km) on the American side of the Rio Grande. 52,000 acres (21,000 ha) are irrigated in the El Paso Valley. The International Dam, about 2 miles (3.2 km) below the American dam, diverts water for the Mexican side of the El Paso Valley, usually called the Valle de Juarez. Beyond the ruins at Fort Quitman the Rio Grande riverbed is often dry until the confluence of the Rio Conchos.

The location at the corner of Texas, New Mexico, and Mexico puts the dam in an area sensitive to border issues. In 2019, the private group We Build the Wall built a half-mile section of border wall extending west from the dam into New Mexico, with a locked gate on federal land by the dam, which blocks access to Monument One on the border, and to part of the levee. The International Boundary and Water Commission cut the lock and locked the gate open to preserve their access to the road along the riverbank by the dam.

== Structure ==
The American Dam was built in 1937–1938 at a cost to the United States Government of $667,398. It is 284 feet (87 m) long, with thirteen radial gates. Water is diverted into the American Canal over a weir, parallel to the general course of the river, with intake controlled by two radial gates. The dam has a normal operating depth of 5 feet (1.5 m), has a structural height of 18 feet (5.5 m), and is flanked by earthen dikes. The crest elevation is 3,684 feet (1,123 m) above sea level, The main spillway into the Rio Grande has a capacity of 12,000 cu ft/s (340 m^{3}/s).

== Downstream canals ==
The American Canal is about 2 miles (3.2 km) long, and has a design capacity of 1,200 cubic feet per second (34 m^{3}/s) of water. The American Canal runs along the north bank of the Rio Grande for two miles, then delivers water into the Rio Grande American Canal Extension (RGACE). This carries water for the Rio Grande Reclamation Project about 12 miles (19 km) to the Riverside Canal Heading, which is just downstream from the Ysleta–Zaragoza International Bridge. By the late 1990s the original American Canal was in poor condition, particularly in the open sections, and operating well below its original planned capacity.

The cement-lined RGACE replaced part of the earthen Franklin Canal, which delivered water through the city of El Paso to farms in El Paso’s Lower Valley. The RGACE, built from 1997 to 1998, was designed to carry 1,535 cubic feet per second (43.5 m^{3}/s) of water. During planning for the RGACE the Mexicans expressed interest in having their 60,000 acre-feet (74,000,000 m^{3}) allotment delivered from the end of the RGACE near Riverside Dam, rather than to the head of the Acequia Madre just below the American Dam, as at present. The water would be delivered via a siphon underneath the Rio Grande.

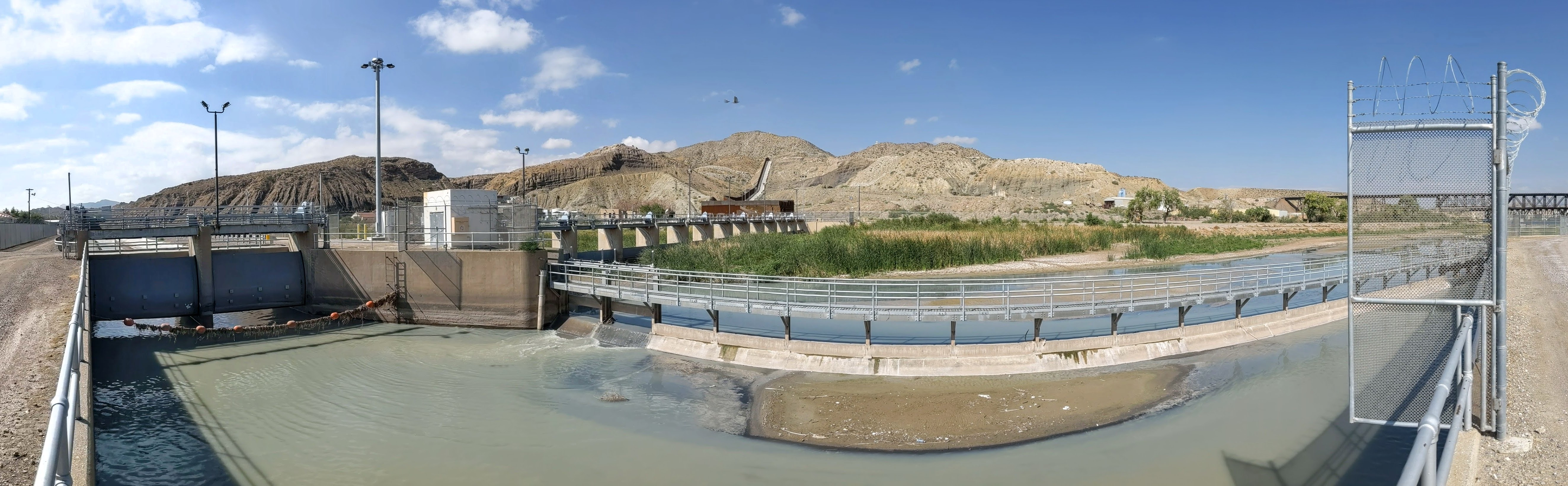
Panoramic view of the American Dam and Canal, with mountains of Mexico (left) and New Mexico (right) in the background. The dam and diversion weirs are in the center; canal at left; railroad bridges over the Rio Grande upstream at right; private border wall and cross on Mount Cristo Rey in center background.
