= Rio Grande Dam =

Dam in Hinsdale County, Colorado, United States

Coordinates: 37°43′15″N 107°16′01″W

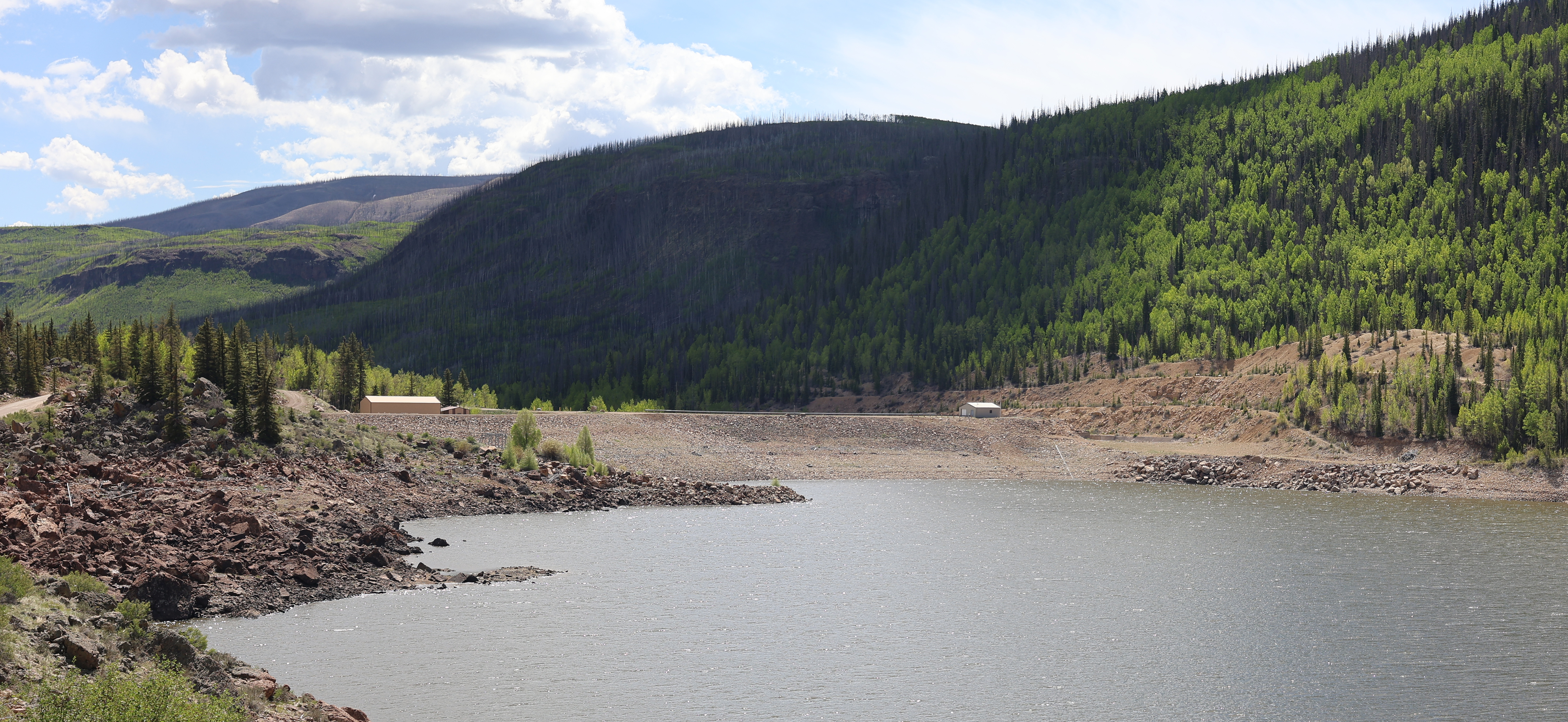
The dam in 2024

Rio Grande Dam is a dam in Hinsdale County, Colorado impounding the Rio Grande. Built between 1910 and 1914 by the San Luis Valley Irrigation District to store water for agriculture in the San Luis Valley, Rio Grande Dam is an earth and rock fill dam 111 ft (34 m) high and 550 ft (170 m) long. The dam impounds the Rio Grande Reservoir, with a capacity of 52,000 acre⋅ft (64,000,000 m^{3}).

The dam and reservoir are situated at an elevation of 9,449 ft (2,880 m) about 20 mi (32 km) southwest of Creede, several miles below the headwaters of the Rio Grande.

== See also ==
- List of Rio Grande dams and diversions
- List of largest reservoirs of Colorado
