= Elephant Butte Historic District =

Historic district in New Mexico, United States

- U.S. National Register of Historic Places
- Location within New Mexico
- Nearest city: Elephant Butte, New Mexico
- Coordinates: 33°08′56″N 107°11′27″W
- Area: 2,443 acres (9.89 km^{2})
- Built: 1916
- Architect: Louis C. Hill
- Architectural style: Pueblo Revival
- NRHP reference No.: 96001616
- Added to NRHP: February 10, 1997

The Elephant Butte Historic District, a historic district in the Elephant Butte, New Mexico, was listed on the National Register of Historic Places in 1997. The district included 30 contributing buildings, 10 contributing structures and 34 contributing sites on 2,443 acres (9.89 km^{2}), as well as numerous non-contributing resources.

It includes the Elephant Butte Dam, which was completed in 1916, and resources associated with its construction such as buildings and roads, and including even garbage dumps from that era which were later themselves recognized as archeological sites for studying the construction era. It includes developments during the New Deal era, which created and expanded power generation and recreation opportunities associated with the dam.

The district runs roughly along New Mexico State Road 51 from the dam to Mescal Canyon and along New Mexico State Road 52 from Ash Canyon to Long Ridge.

The dam itself is important for its effect on agriculture and life in its area and down the Rio Grande valley in both the U.S. and Mexico. The construction of the dam allowed early season water runoff to be stored until needed for agricultural purposes, and addressed water rights claims by Mexico which had come into contention when water supply dropped due to diversions in the U.S. and due to the changing environment. Runoff peaked earlier each year due to deforestation in the upper reaches of the watershed, and was unusable for agriculture which needed water later in the growing seasons.

The United States disputed the Mexican claims, but eventually proceeded nonetheless with the dam project and with guarantees of water for Mexico as well as for agricultural areas in southern New Mexico and west Texas.

A site lower far downriver, at the El Paso narrows, was considered for a dam, but would have flooded a large area of the lower Mesilla Valley and would have interfered with railway and other transportation. Also a private dam project only 1,500 feet upstream from the final Elephant Butte dam site was in the works, but was eventually stymied by legal issues. The project raised funds from British investors in 1894, and had permission of the U.S. Department of the Interior. It was eventually blocked by the U.S. Secretary of State, Olney, on basis of a technicality that the Rio Grande was arguably a navigable river and permission from the War Department was also needed. Court cases delayed the project, and after an injunction against building the dam was lifted in 1897, the project failed to proceed, and the investors lost their rights to the dam site in 1903.

Studies determined that water supply from a dam at Elephant Butte could meet demands of all irrigation projects in the U.S. and Mexico, and in 1906 the U.S. agreed to water rights for Mexico of 60,000 acre-feet per year, despite the U.S. not admitting Mexico's claims. The project was an important precedent. Before this, the U.S. government had mostly given up waterways' control to states; here, the U.S. government found legal mechanisms to take back control. These were applied elsewhere and forever changed balance of power between the federal government and states.
