= Leasburg Dam State Park =

State park in New Mexico, United States

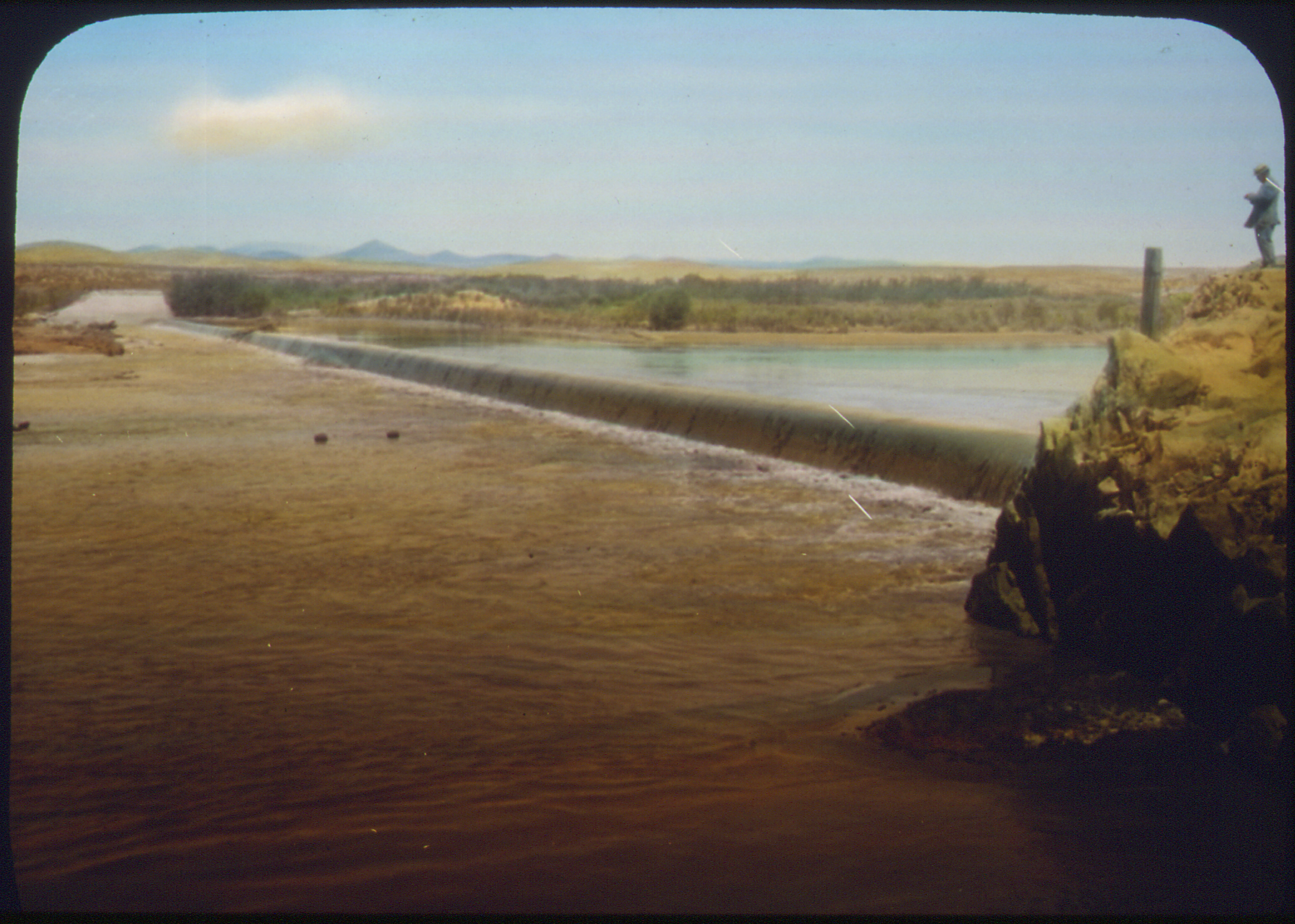
- Leasburg Dam, ca. 1908

- Location within New Mexico
- Location: Doña Ana County, New Mexico, United States
- Coordinates: 32°29′34″N 106°55′04″W
- Area: 293 acres (119 ha)
- Elevation: 3,962 ft (1,208 m)
- Established: 1971
- Administrator: New Mexico Energy, Minerals and Natural Resources Department
- Website: Official website

Leasburg Dam State Park is a state park of New Mexico, United States, located on the Rio Grande 15 miles (24 km) north of Las Cruces.. It provides opportunities for camping, hiking, picnicking, swimming, and wildlife viewing. Nearby is the historic Fort Selden State Monument.

The dam at Leasburg was completed in 1908 to divert water into canals for nearby farms in the Mesilla Valley. Early settlers used the area as a passage to El Camino Real and the Jornada del Muerto.
