= Platoro Dam =

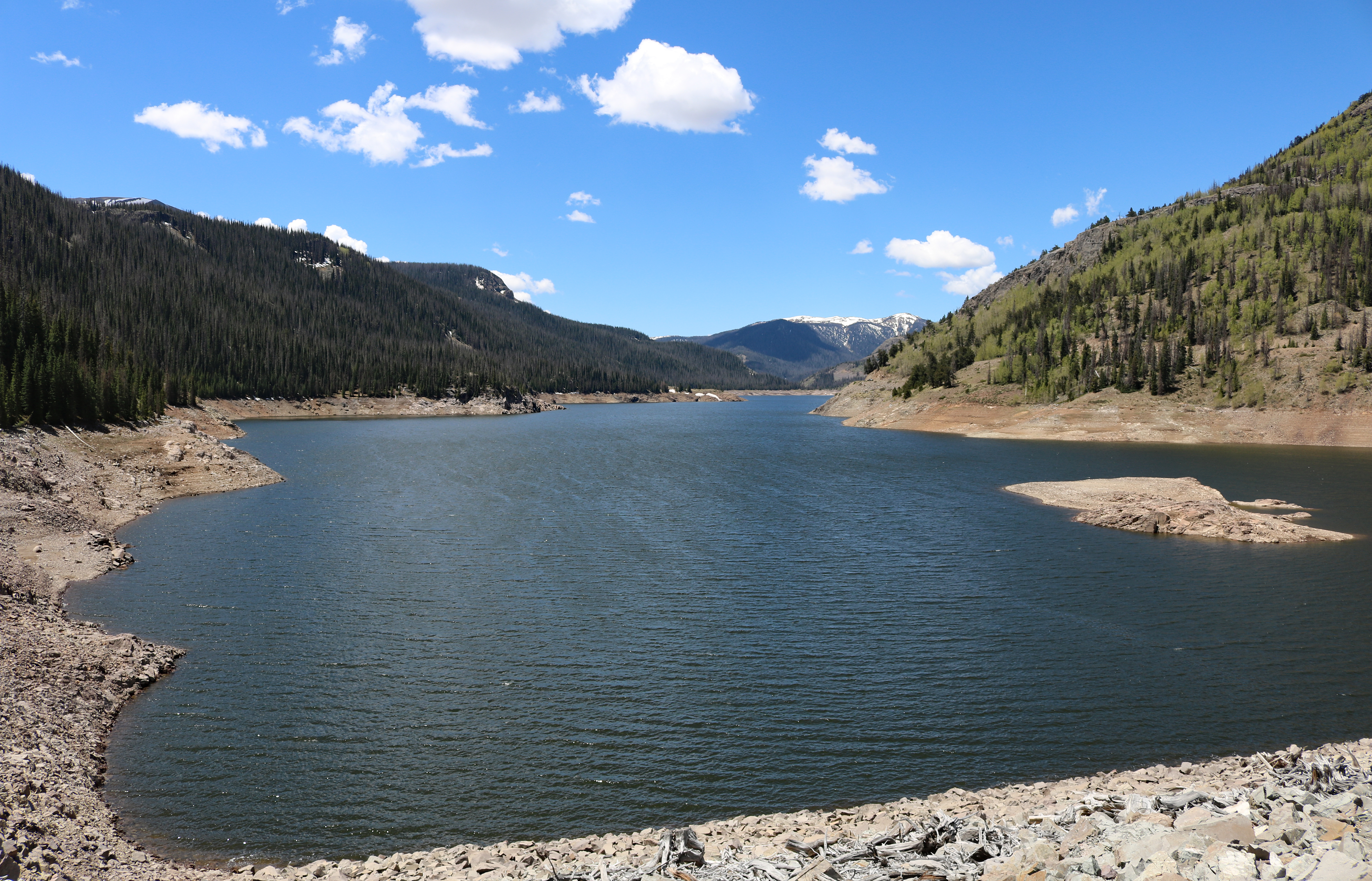
- The reservoir viewed from the top of the dam

- Location within Colorado
- Country: United States
- Location: Conejos County, Colorado
- Coordinates: 37.35114°N 106.5473°W
- Purpose: Irrigation water storage
- Opening date: 1951
- Owner: United States Bureau of Reclamation

Dam and spillways
- Height: 165 feet (50 m)
- Elevation at crest: 9,993 feet (3,046 m)
- Width (crest): 1,475 feet (450 m)

Reservoir
- Total capacity: 53,506 acre-feet (65,999,000 m^{3})
- Surface area: 1.5 square miles (3.9 km^{2})
- Normal elevation: 9,977 feet (3,041 m)

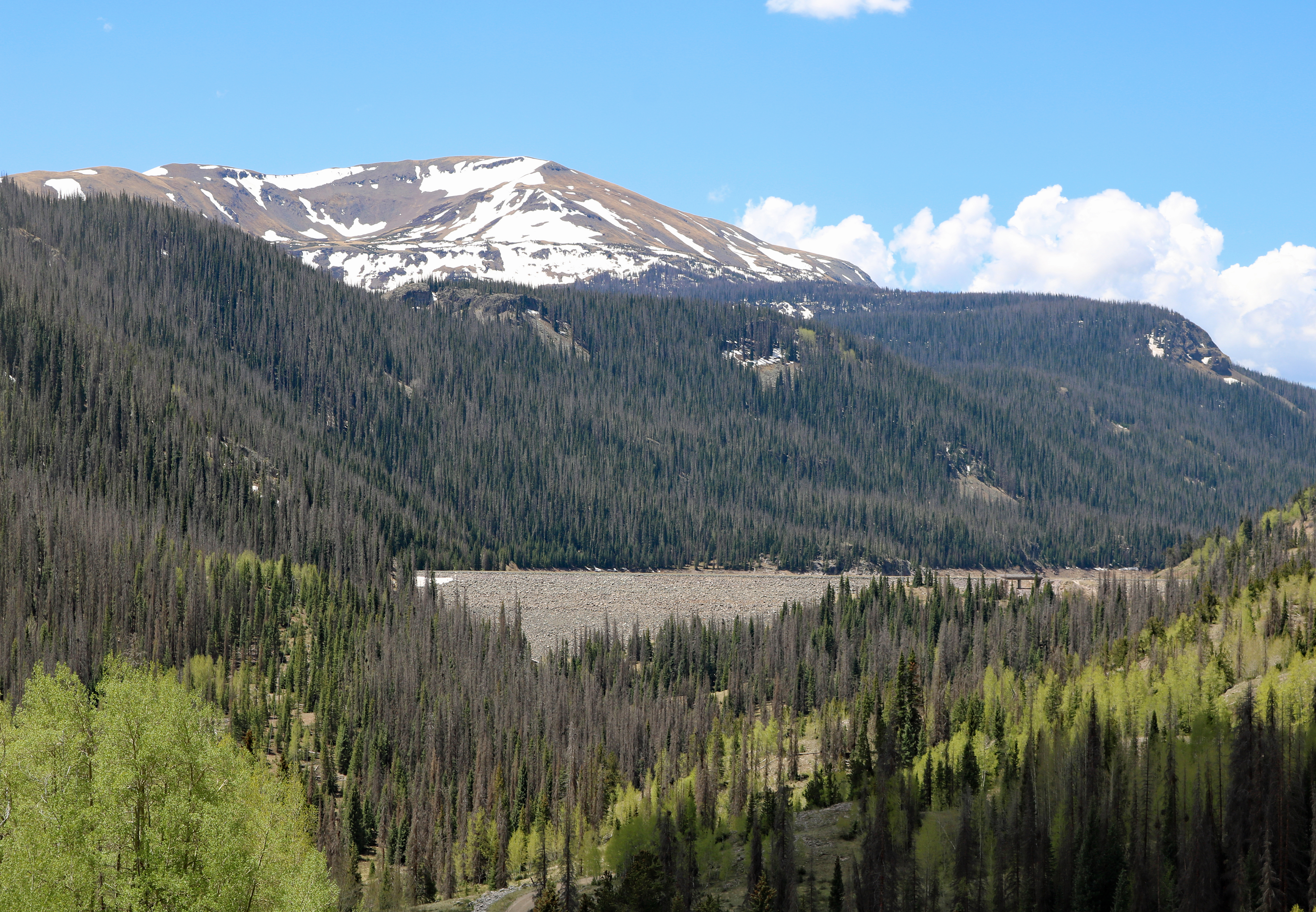
The dam viewed from across the canyon

Platoro Dam (National ID # CO82911) is a dam in Conejos County, Colorado.

The earthen dam was constructed between 1949 and 1951 by the United States Bureau of Reclamation with a height of 165 feet (50 m), and 1,475 feet (450 m) long at its crest. It impounds the Conejos River, a tributary of the Rio Grande, for irrigation water storage as part of the larger San Luis Valley Project. The dam is owned by the Bureau and operated by the local Conejos Water Conservancy.

The reservoir it creates, Platoro Reservoir, has a normal water surface of 1.5 square miles (3.9 km^{2}), and a maximum capacity of 53,506 acre-feet (65,999,000 m^{3}). Recreation includes fishing, camping, boating and hunting, although use is light because of the remote, high mountain valley location and the short season.

== See also ==
- List of Rio Grande dams and diversions
- List of largest reservoirs of Colorado
