= Percha Diversion Dam =

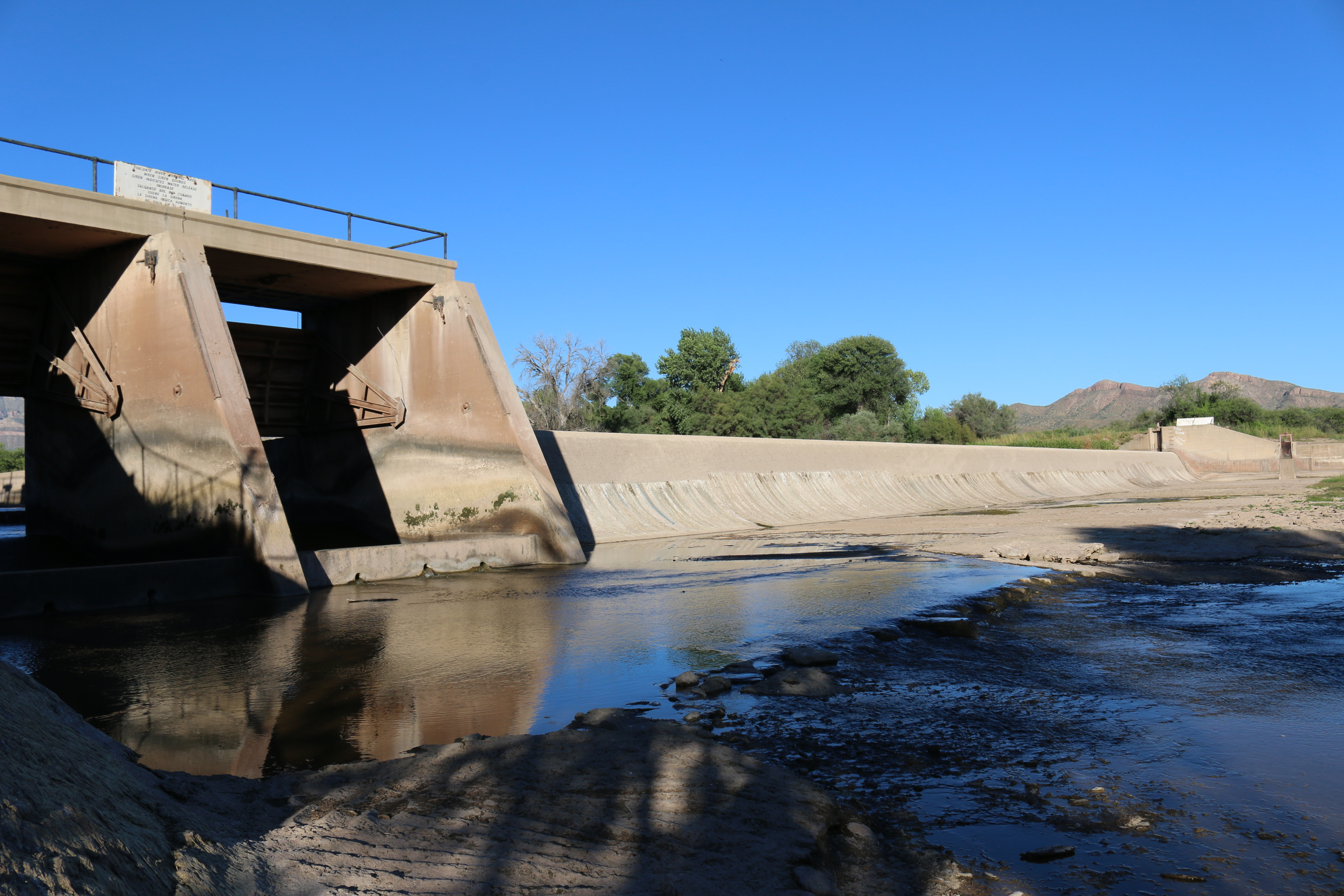
- Interactive map of Percha Diversion Dam
- Country: United States
- Location: Sierra County, New Mexico
- Purpose: Irrigation
- Opening date: 1918
- Owner: United States Bureau of Reclamation

Dam and spillways
- Type of dam: Diversion dam
- Percha Diversion Dam
- U.S. National Register of Historic Places
- NM State Register of Cultural Properties
- Location within New Mexico Location within the United States
- Nearest city: Arrey, New Mexico
- Coordinates: 32°52′6″N 107°18′11″W
- Area: 3 acres (1.2 ha)
- Built: 1916
- Architect: L.M. Lawson
- Architectural style: Ogee Weir
- NRHP reference No.: 79001555
- NMSRCP No.: 570

Significant dates
- Added to NRHP: April 6, 1979
- Designated NMSRCP: January 20, 1978

The Percha Diversion Dam is a structure built in 1918 on the Rio Grande in New Mexico, United States. It diverts water from the Rio Grande into the Rincon Valley Main Canal, an irrigation canal.

== Location ==
Percha Diversion Dam was completed on the Rio Grande in 1918, 21 miles south of Truth or Consequences, New Mexico. It is two miles downstream from Caballo Dam, which was built in 1938. It is listed on the National Register of Historic Places. The dam is accessible within the 80 acres (32 ha) Percha Dam State Park, which is considered one of the top five bird-watching sites in New Mexico.

== Structure ==
The dam is a reinforced concrete weir, 350 feet (110 m) long and 18.5 feet (5.6 m) tall. When the embankment wings are included the crest is 2,720 feet (830 m) long. The dam includes eight Tainter gates that lift the level of the river 6 feet (1.8 m) above its normal elevation so it can be diverted into the canal.

== Downstream canal ==
Percha Diversion Dam diverts the stored water into the 27.1 miles (43.6 km) long Rincon Valley Main Canal, which carries water to irrigate lands in the Rincon Valley between Truth or Consequences and Las Cruces, New Mexico. The Rincon canal crosses over the Rio Grande in the Garfield Flume, and under the river in the Hatch and Rincon siphons.

== See also ==
- National Register of Historic Places listings in Sierra County, New Mexico
