= Elephant Butte Irrigation District =

- U.S. National Register of Historic Places
- Location within the United States
- Nearest city: Las Cruces, New Mexico
- Coordinates: 32°12′58″N 106°57′31″W
- Area: 6,870 acres (27.8 km^{2})
- Built: 1906
- Built by: U. S. Bureau of Reclamation
- Architectural style: Irrigation System
- NRHP reference No.: 97000822
- Added to NRHP: August 8, 1997

The Elephant Butte Irrigation District is a 6,870 acres (27.8 km^{2}) historic district in New Mexico and Texas which was listed on the National Register of Historic Places in 1997. The listing included three contributing buildings and 214 contributing structures, in Doña Ana County, New Mexico, Sierra County, New Mexico and El Paso County, Texas.

It preserves portions of the Rio Grande Project, a U.S. Bureau of Reclamation project which distributes water of the upper Rio Grande River.

It is in the area of Las Cruces, New Mexico. The district runs roughly along U.S. Route 85 between its junction with New Mexico State Road 90 and the El Paso, Texas city limits.

== See also ==
- Farm and Ranch Heritage Museum, Las Cruces.
