= Elephant Butte Dam =

Dam on the Rio Grande in New Mexico, United States

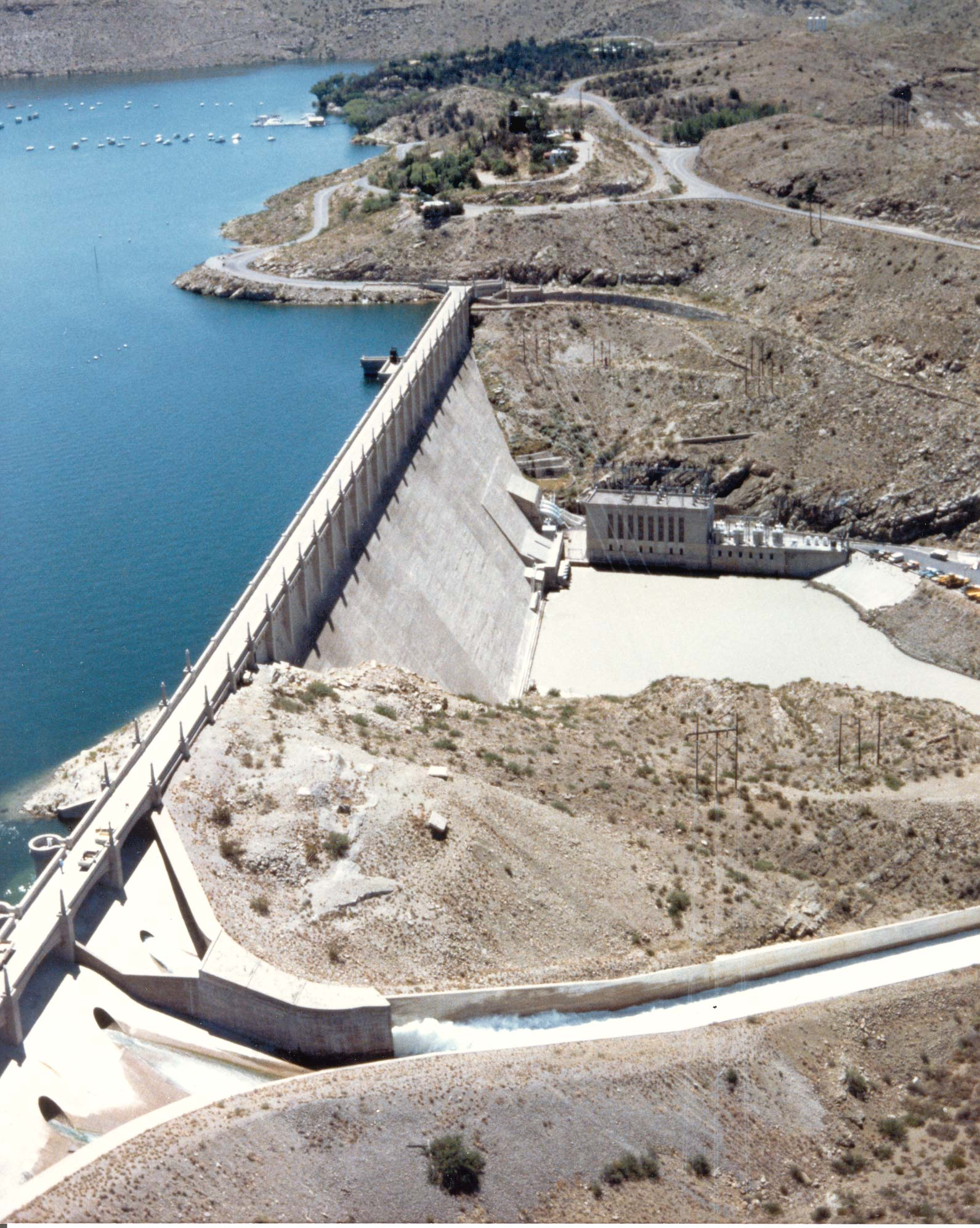
- The dam and reservoir at highstand
- Interactive map of Elephant Butte Dam
- Country: United States
- Location: Elephant Butte, New Mexico
- Coordinates: 33.153969°N 107.192113°W
- Status: In use
- Construction began: 1911
- Opening date: 1916
- Owner: U.S. Bureau of Reclamation

Dam and spillways
- Type of dam: Gravity
- Impounds: Rio Grande
- Height: 301 ft (92 m)
- Length: 1,674 ft (510 m)
- Width (crest): 18 ft (5 m)
- Width (base): 228 ft (69 m)
- Dam volume: 618,785 cu yd (473,095 m^{3})
- Spillway type: Concrete chute

Reservoir
- Creates: Elephant Butte Lake
- Total capacity: 2,065,010 acre⋅ft (2.547152329×10^{9} m^{3})
- Catchment area: 28,900 mi^{2} (75,000 km^{2})
- Surface area: 36,500 acres (14,800 ha)

Power Station
- Hydraulic head: 140 ft (43 m) (rated)
- Turbines: 1 x Francis turbine
- Installed capacity: 27.95 MW
- Annual generation: 38,449,061 kWh
- Elephant Butte Dam
- U.S. National Register of Historic Places
- NM State Register of Cultural Properties
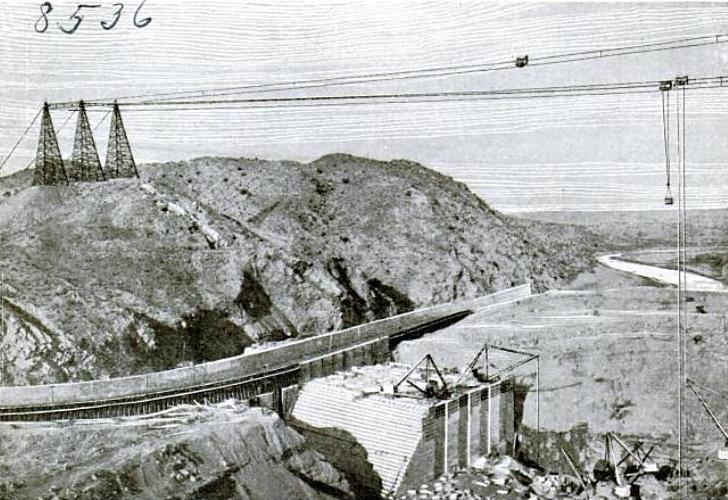
- The spillway is in the lower left corner of the picture and the power plant is located at the base of the opposite side of the dam.

- Location within New Mexico Location within the United States
- Nearest city: Elephant Butte, New Mexico
- Area: 45 acres (18 ha)
- Built: 1910
- Architect: Louis C. Hill
- Architectural style: Gravity-type
- NRHP reference No.: 79001556
- NMSRCP No.: 617

Significant dates
- Added to NRHP: April 9, 1979
- Designated NMSRCP: March 20, 1978

Elephant Butte Dam or Elephant Butte Dike, originally Engle Dam, is a concrete gravity dam on the Rio Grande near Truth or Consequences, New Mexico, in the United States. The dam impounds Elephant Butte Reservoir, which is used mainly for agriculture but also provides for recreation, hydroelectricity, and flood and sediment control. The construction of the dam has reduced the flow of the Rio Grande to a small stream for most of the year, with water being released only during the summer irrigation season or during times of exceptionally heavy snow melt.

== Etymology ==
Elephant Butte is an exposed volcanic plug in Sierra County, New Mexico. The sides of the volcano have eroded away and left only the solidified butte-shaped core. It is now an island in the lake except at low-water levels, when it is connected to land by an isthmus. The butte was said to have the shape of an elephant lying on its side, and its name has been applied to the area since before the dam's construction. The nearby city of Elephant Butte was named for the rock formation.

The original name of the dam was Engle Dam, after the nearby railroad stop at Engle, New Mexico. The stop was named "Engle" after the construction engineer R.L. Engle and was later renamed to "Engel" by the Santa Fe Railroad after their company's vice president, Edward Engel. Locals complained to Congress about the name change but were unsuccessful in having the name reverted. Today, the stop bears its original name, "Engle."

Another name proposed for the dam and used in at least one publication was "Woodrow Wilson Dam," after the former U.S. president.

The proposed name for the reservoir was "Lake B.M. Hall," after Bureau of Reclamation engineer Benjamin Mortimer Hall, who championed the project.

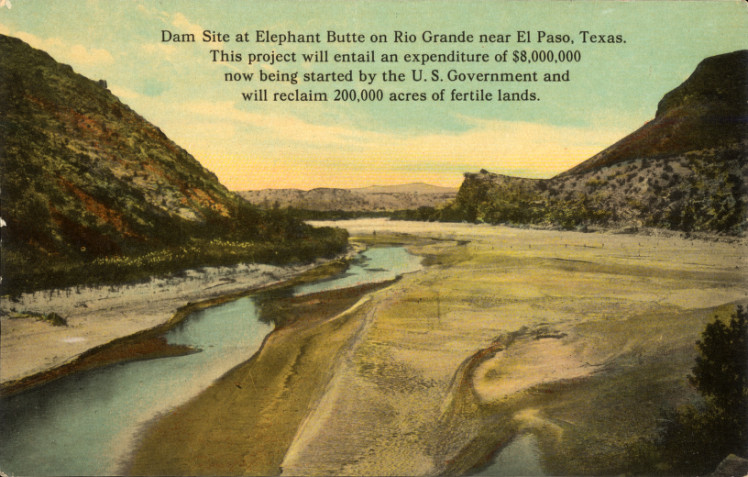
Dam site, Elephant Butte (postcard, circa 1916-1924)

== History ==
=== Drought and floods ===
Like for many other rivers of the American Southwest, runoff in the Rio Grande basin is limited and varies widely from year to year and alternates between devastating droughts and destructive floods. In the 1880s, farmers in the region began to complain that they were not receiving a fair appropriation of river water. By the 1890s, water use in the upper basin was so great that the river's flow near El Paso, Texas, had been reduced to "a trickle in dry summers."

To resolve those problems, plans were drafted up for a large storage dam at Elephant Butte, about 130 miles (210 km) downstream of Albuquerque, New Mexico. The first to propose a dam for the area were Peter E. Kern, E.V. Berrien, John Campbell, R.M. Loomis and Edward Roberts. They had camped in the area where the dam is now; although Kern encouraged the others to consider building a dam there, its construction was delayed by legal battles relating to the final site and to water rights.

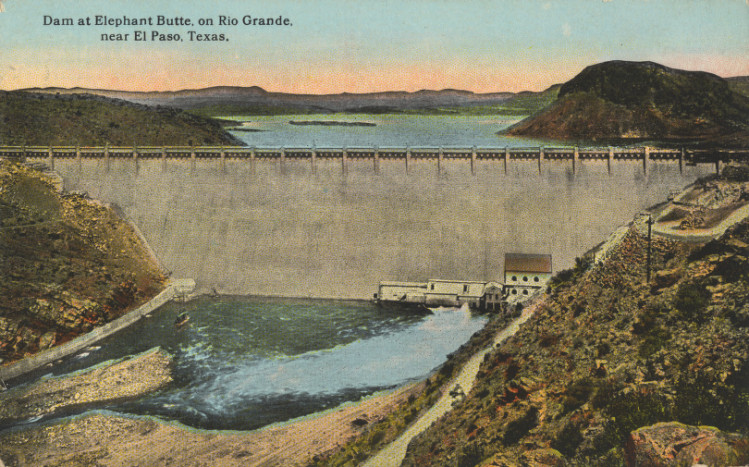
Dam at Elephant Butte, on Rio Grande, near Truth or Consequences, New Mexico (postcard, circa 1916)

A site lower far downriver, at the El Paso narrows (the former site of the ASARCO plant at Smeltertown), was considered for a dam, but it would have flooded much of the lower Mesilla Valley and interfered with railway and other transportation. The site at Elephant Butte was chosen for those reasons and for its mountainous location, which created a natural basin for a reservoir. The river at the site was "too thin to plow, too thick to drink." The proposed dam featured in the 1906 Boundary Waters Convention between the United States and Mexico, which also specified how much water should be delivered to Mexico after the dam's completion.

A private dam project backed by British investors was in the works in 1894 just upstream from the dam site and also by the U.S. Department of the Interior. It was eventually blocked by the U.S. Secretary of State "on basis of a technicality that the Rio Grande was arguably a navigable river and permission from the War Department was also needed." Although delayed by legal issues, the injunction against building the dam was lifted in 1897. However, the project failed to proceed, and the investors lost their rights to build the private dam in 1903.

The Victorio Land and Cattle Co. owned about three fourths of the site and in 1909 demanded the government pay $17.83 per acre, instead of the substantially lower offer of $1.83 per acre. A lengthy court battle ensued, and the US government condemned 24,730 acres of the company's land and settled on a price of $6.66 per acre for the remaining 30,000 acres.

=== Construction ===
The U.S. Congress passed the Newlands Reclamation Act in 1902, authorizing the Rio Grande Project to provide power and irrigation to south-central New Mexico and western Texas as a Bureau of Reclamation undertaking. For the next two years, surveyors and engineers undertook a comprehensive feasibility study for the project's dams and reservoirs. Construction of the dam was authorized on February 25, 1905, and began in 1911.

To accommodate the dam's construction, crews built and improved roads and constructed a Bureau of Reclamation office, water tanks, worker camps, a machine shop, a power plant, and a hospital. A system of three cables, each having a capacity of 15 tons and a span of 1,400 feet (430 m), was suspended across the canyon over the site.

At its peak, the camps housed around 3,500 workers. Two worker camps housed them. The "Upper Camp" was built upstream and housed affluential and skilled workers, such as supervisors and engineers. The "Lower Camp" was downstream of the site, housed the less influential laborers, and was further segregated by American and Mexican workers living in separate areas of the camp. Upper Camp was inundated by the dam's own reservoir, but although it was on dry land, Lower Camp has no trace remaining.

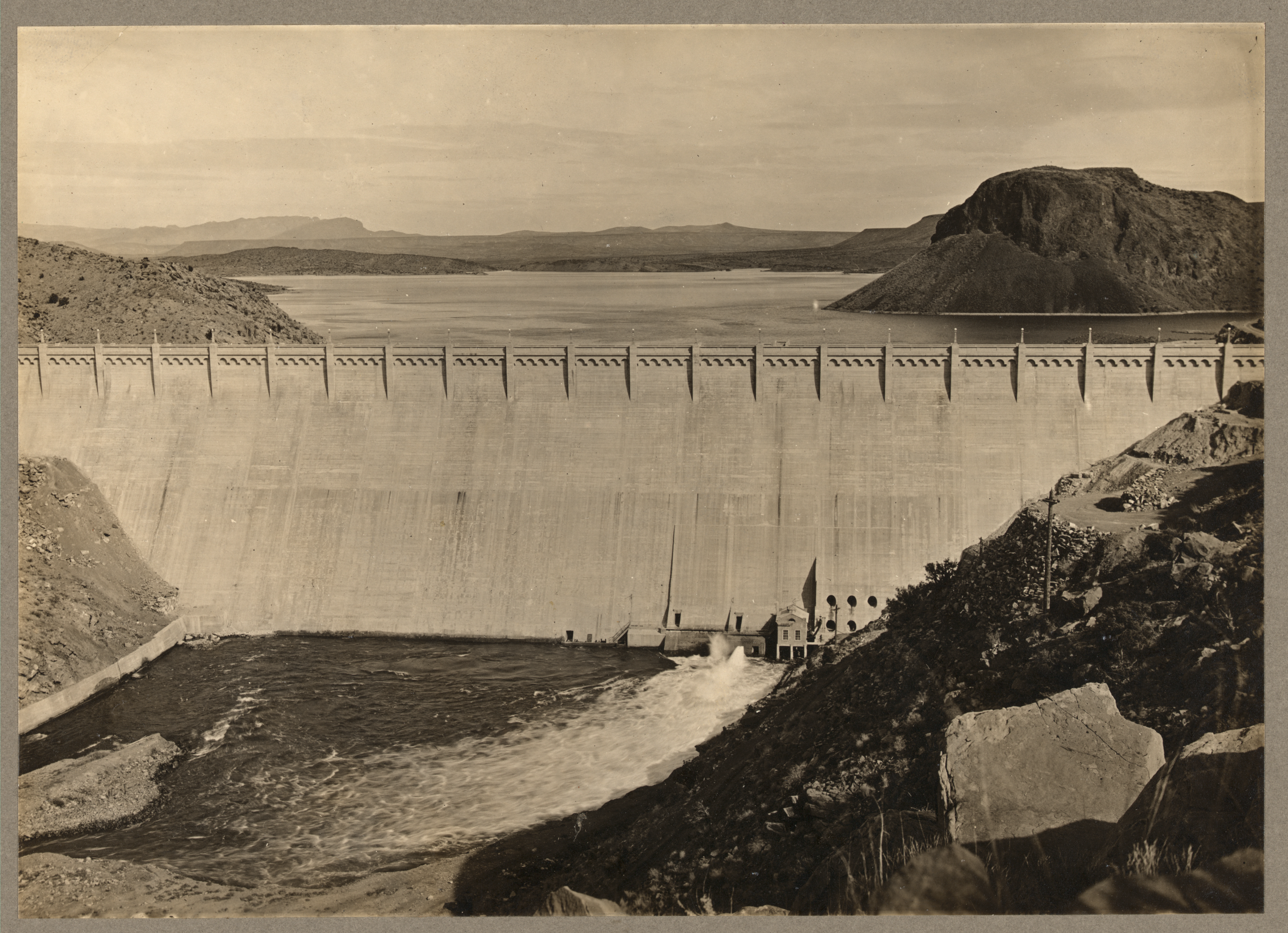
Photograph of the newly finished dam in 1916. The reservoir is partially filled. The characteristic white mineral stains on the hills are absent, as they were created during the 1942 highstand.

During its construction, the dam was the largest irrigation dam ever built except for the Aswan Dam, in Egypt, and impounded the world's largest artificial lake. It was expected that the dam would become the property of the local settlers once a water tax had reimbursed the government for the cost of construction.

Elephant Butte Dam was designated as a National Historic Civil Engineering Landmark by the American Society of Civil Engineers in 1976. The dam and Bureau of Reclamation office were listed on the U.S. National Register of Historic Places in 1979. Historic resources from the era of construction of the dam, as well as from the New Deal era development of power generation and recreation facilities in the area, were recognized in the 1997 listing of a 2,443 acres (9.89 km^{2}) area on the National Register as the Elephant Butte Historic District. The historic district listing includes the dam and surrounding historic structures.

== Characteristics ==
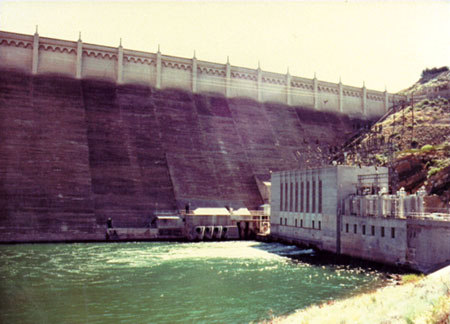
Elephant Butte Powerplant

Elephant Butte Dam is 301 feet (91.7 m) high, 1,674 feet (510.2 m) long including the spillway and is made from 618,785 cubic yards (473,095 m³) of concrete. The width at the top of the dam is 18 feet (5.5 m) and 228 feet (69.5 m) at the base.

The reservoir has a capacity of 2,065,010 acre-feet (2.54715×10^{9} m^{3}) of water and controls the runoff from 28,900 square miles (74,850 km²). It provides irrigation to 178,000 acres (720 km²) of land. The dam also contains a 28 MW hydroelectric powerplant. The current turbine was installed in 1940 and generates 38,449,061 kWh per year (as of 2005).

== See also ==
- List of Rio Grande dams and diversions
- Caballo Dam
- National Register of Historic Places listings in Sierra County, New Mexico
