= Red Bluff Dam =

- Location within Texas
- Country: United States
- Location: Reeves County, Texas; Loving County, Texas
- Coordinates: 31.9014°N 103.9110°W
- Purpose: Irrigation and flood control

Red Bluff Dam is a dam in the Pecos River, situated about 40 miles (64 km) north of Pecos, Texas. Its Red Bluff Reservoir was formed in 1936 by the dam construction, organized by the Red Bluff Water Control District to provide water for irrigation and hydroelectric power.

== Planning and construction ==
A water user's association was formed to promote the dam in 1916, and surveying began in 1921. In 1924 the states of Texas and New Mexico agreed to allow construction, and in 1926 President Calvin Coolidge approved the plan. In 1927 the Red Bluff Water Control District was formed to manage the project from seven existing water districts. In 1934 the loan for construction was approved by the Public Works Administration. The dam was completed in September 1936, and started to supply water in 1937.

== Structure ==
The dam is an earthfill structure 9,200 feet (2,800 m) long, 102 feet (31 m) high and with a crest width of 25 feet (7.6 m). Crest length is 790 feet (240 m). Crest elevation is 2,828 feet (862 m) above sea level. Spillway width is 1,233 feet (376 m). The spillway is concrete ogee controlled by 12 tainter gates, each 25 by 15 feet (7.6 by 4.6 m). The dam includes two hydroelectric plants with a combined capacity of 2,300 kilowatts.

The reservoir can safely store 307,000 acre-feet (379,000,000 m^{3}).The surface area of the reservoir is 7,507 acres (3,038 ha). Maximum discharge is 389,749 cubic feet (11,036.5 m^{3}) per second. Water from the dam irrigates 145,000 acres (59,000 ha) of farmland.
