= Caballo Dam =

Dam on the Rio Grande in New Mexico, United States

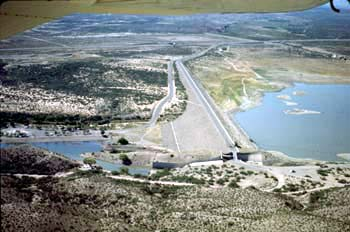
- Caballo Dam from the air

- Location within New Mexico
- Country: United States
- Location: Sierra County, New Mexico
- Coordinates: 32.8964°N 107.2934°W
- Purpose: Irrigation,

Dam and spillways
- Height: 96 ft (29 m)
- Length: 4,590 ft (1,400 m)

Reservoir
- Total capacity: 343,990 acre-feet (424,310,000 m^{3})

Caballo Dam is an earthen dam on the Rio Grande about 15 miles (24 km) downstream from Truth or Consequences, New Mexico, United States. In conjunction with Elephant Butte Dam, which lies about 25 miles (40 km) upstream, it regulates the discharge of the river in the lower Rio Grande Valley of New Mexico. Caballo serves as an afterbay for the Elephant Butte Reservoir, i.e. it stores water released from Elephant Butte for hydroelectricity generation purposes and discharges it in the dry season to provide for irrigation agriculture downstream. The dam is an important part of the Rio Grande Project. A secondary purpose of the dam was to compensate for lost capacity in Elephant Butte Lake due to sedimentation.

Caballo Dam is 96 feet (29 m) high and stands 82 feet (25 m) above the Rio Grande. It is 4,590 feet (1,400 m) long and contains 33,578,388 cubic feet (950,834.1 m^{3}) of material. The elevation of the crest is 4,190 feet (1,280 m) and the average elevation of its reservoir, Caballo Lake, is 4,172 feet (1,272 m). The dam has two water outlets; the outlet works have a capacity of 5,000 cubic feet per second (140 m^{3}/s), and the main spillway has a capacity of 33,200 cubic feet per second (940 m^{3}/s). Caballo Lake is roughly 7 miles (11 km) long and stores up to 343,990 acre-feet (424,310,000 m^{3}) of water.

== See also ==
- Caballo Lake State Park
- List of rivers of New Mexico
