= American Canal =

Canal in Texas, United States

Coordinates: 31.7724°N 106.5153°W

American canal
- Interactive map of American canal

History
- Current owner: El Paso County Water District 1
- Date completed: 1938
- Date restored: 2020

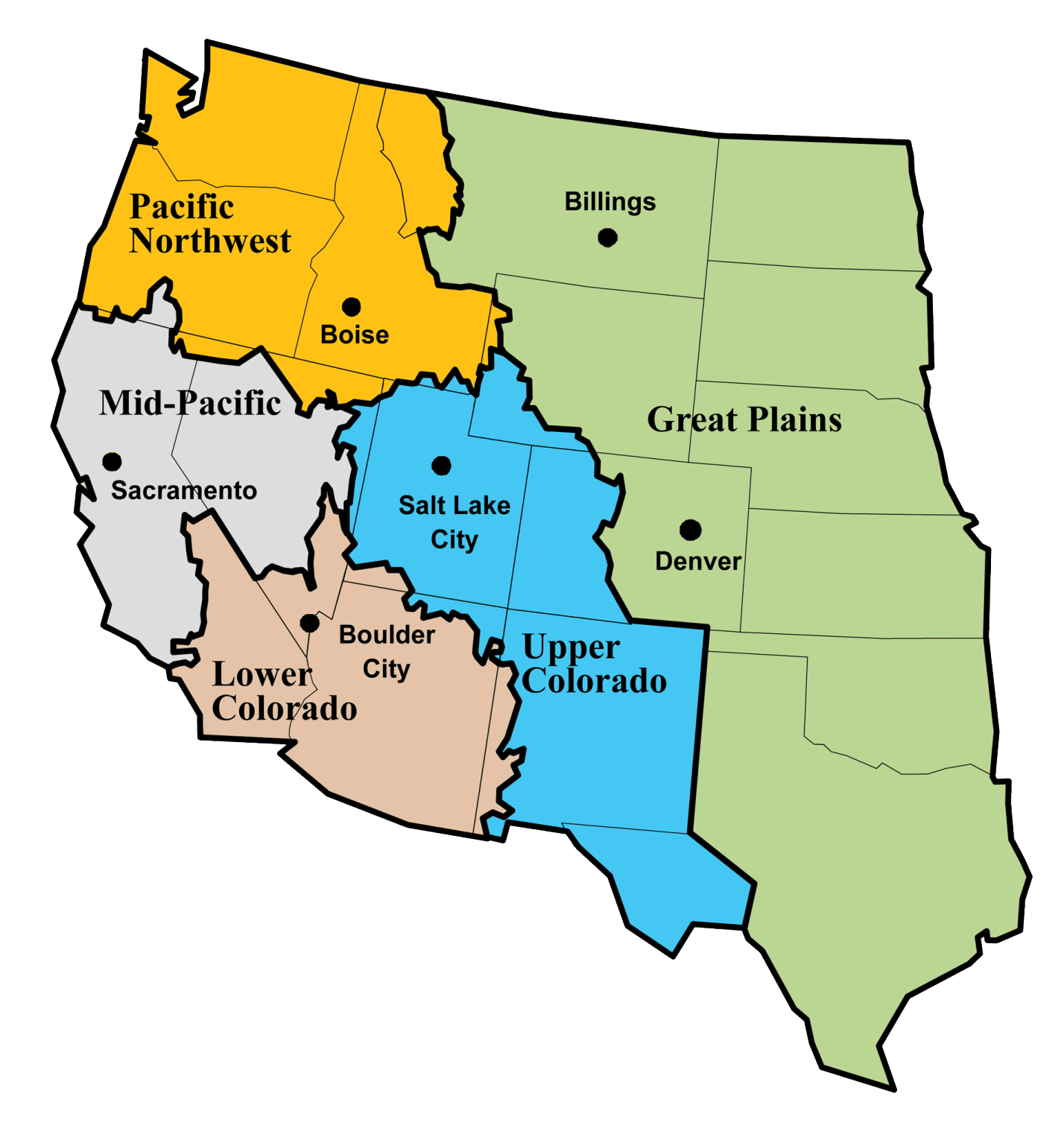
The American Canal is in the southern part of the Upper Colorado Region

The American Canal is an irrigation canal in the Upper Rio Grande Valley near El Paso, Texas. The canal acquires water from the Rio Grande from the American Diversion Dam at the Texas–New Mexico–Mexico border, 2 miles (3.2 km) northwest of downtown El Paso. The canal supplies the majority of the raw water to El Paso’s Johnathan-Roger Water Treatment Plant. It also mitigates flooding in south El Paso neighborhoods. The canal travels along the Rio Grande for 2.1 miles (3.4 km) where it flows into the Franklin Canal and the rest of the canal network. Construction of the canal dates back to 1938.

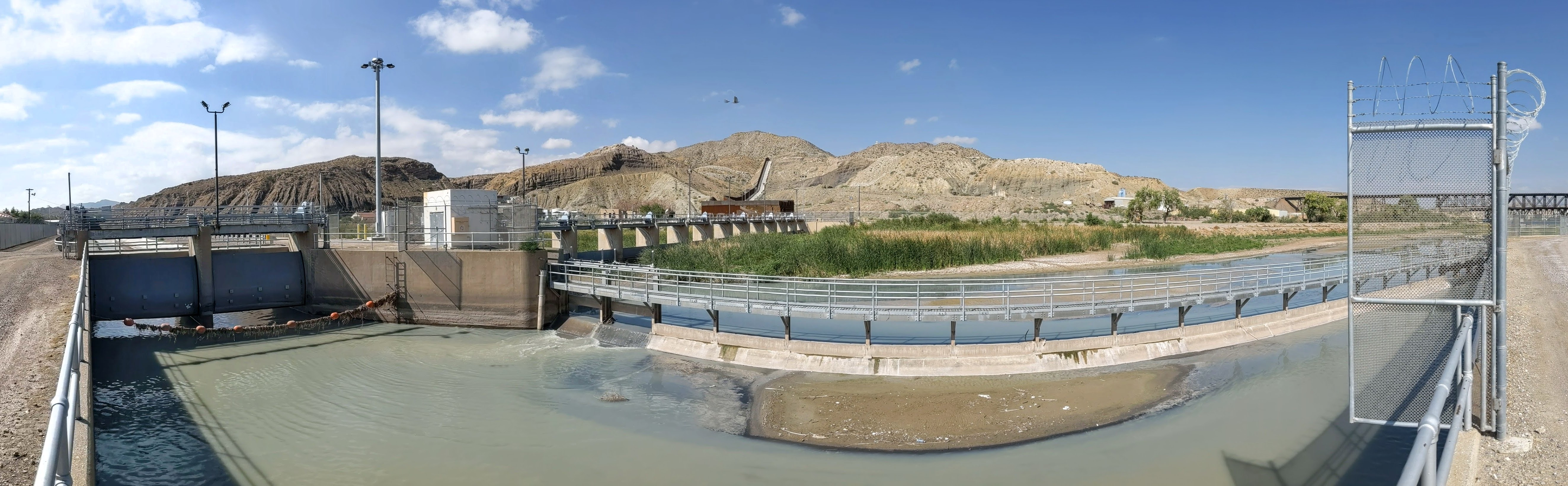
Panoramic view of the American Dam and Canal, with mountains of Mexico (left) and New Mexico (right) in the background. The dam and diversion weirs are in the center; canal at left; railroad bridges over the Rio Grande upstream at right; private border wall and cross on Mount Cristo Rey in center background.

== See also ==
- Texas Irrigation Canals
- Franklin Canal (Texas)
- Riverside Canal
