= Leasburg Diversion Dam =

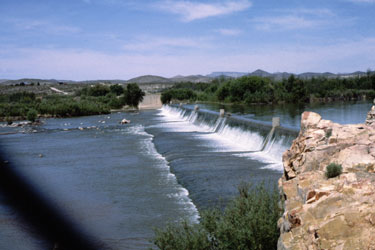

- Location within New Mexico
- Country: United States
- Location: Doña Ana County, New Mexico
- Coordinates: 32.497231°N 106.922733°W
- Purpose: Irrigation
- Opening date: 1907
- Owner: United States Bureau of Reclamation

Dam and spillways
- Type of dam: Diversion dam
- Height: 10 feet (3.0 m)
- Length: 600 feet (180 m)

The Leasburg Diversion Dam is a structure completed in 1907 on the Rio Grande in New Mexico, United States. It diverts water from the Rio Grande into the 13.7 miles (22.0 km) long Leasburg Canal, which carries irrigation water into the upper Mesilla Valley, north of Las Cruces, New Mexico.

== Location ==
The town of Leasburg, now Radium Springs, grew up around Fort Selden, 18 miles north of Las Cruces. A diversion dam was built for irrigation purposes built of poles and interwoven with twigs and stones for ballast. The Rio Grande Project was authorized on 2 December 1905. The U.S. Reclamation Service designed a 10 feet (3.0 m) high, 600 feet (180 m) long concrete weir to replace the old dam. Work began in November 1906.

Leasburg Diversion Dam was the first dam completed on the Rio Grande Project by the United States Bureau of Reclamation. By 1908, the Rio Grande was being diverted into the Leasburg Canal to irrigate 31,600 acres (12,800 ha) of land in the upper Mesilla Valley. Nine miles south of the dam, the 502 feet (153 m) long, steel truss Picacho Flume carried canal water over the Rio Grande. In 1919 the crest of Leasburg Dam was raised 1.25 feet (0.38 m).

Recreation opportunities at the dam are operated by Leasburg Dam State Park.
