= Franklin Canal (Texas) =

Coordinates: 31°40′21″N 106°22′35″W

- Interactive map of Franklin Canal
- Location: El Paso, Texas
- Country: United States

Specifications
- Length: 28.4 miles (45.7 km)

History
- Current owner: National Park Service
- Date completed: 1891

- Franklin Canal
- U.S. National Register of Historic Places
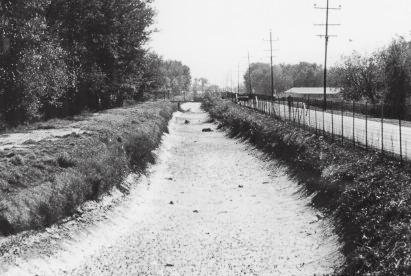
- Franklin Canal
- Nearest city: El Paso, Texas
- Area: 184 acres (74 ha)
- Built: 1889
- Built by: El Paso Irrigation Company
- NRHP reference No.: 92000696
- Added to NRHP: June 19, 1992

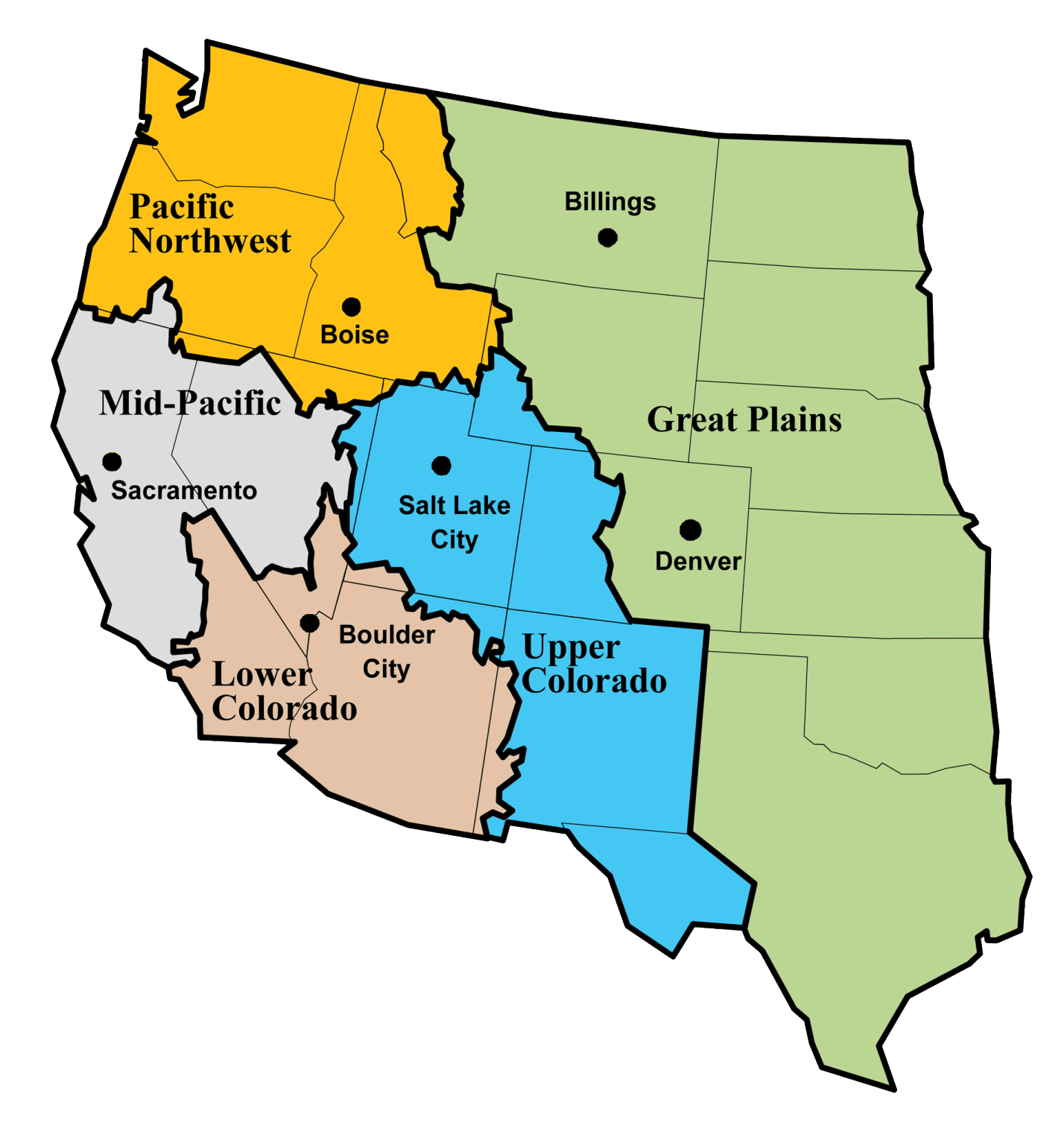
The Franklin Canal is in the southern part of the Upper Colorado Region

The Franklin Canal is an irrigation canal in the Upper Rio Grande Valley near El Paso, Texas. The canal acquires water from the Rio Grande via the American Canal. The canal is 28.4 miles (45.7 km) long with a capacity of 325 cubic feet per second (9.2 m^{3}/s).

The Franklin Irrigation Company completed the canal in 1891 at a cost of $150,000. In 1912, the U.S. Reclamation Service purchased the canal, and it became a key part of the Rio Grande Project.

The canal was renovated and enlarged between 1912 and 1916. The work included repairing the diversion dam, enlarging the heading of the canal, and lining a portion of the channel with concrete. When completed, the canal was capable of irrigating 40,000 acres (16,000 ha).

== See also ==
- National Register of Historic Places listings in El Paso County, Texas
- Texas Irrigation Canals
- Riverside Canal
- American Canal
