= Dvořák (surname) =

Dvořák (feminine: Dvořáková) is a Czech surname. Originally the word dvořák referred to a servant or an official of manorial estate or royal court, or denoted a free peasant on a large estate. There is also a theory that the surname was derived from the adjective zdvořilý ('polite'). As of 2022, it is the fourth most common surname in the Czech Republic.

An anglicized form of the surname is Dvorak. A diminutive form of the surname is Dvořáček. Notable people with the surname include:

== Arts ==
- Ann Dvorak, stage name of Anna McKim (1912–1979), American actress
- Antonín Dvořák (1841–1904), Czech composer
- Eva Švankmajerová (née Dvořáková; 1940–2005), Czech surrealist artist
- František Dvořák (painter), (1862–1927), Czech painter
- Helena Dvořáková (born 1979), Czech actress
- Josef Dvořák (born 1942), Czech actor
- Ludmila Dvořáková (1923–2015), Czech operatic soprano
- Lukáš Dvořák (born 1982), Czech photographer
- Max Dvořák (1874–1921), Austrian art historian
- Miloš Dvořák (1938–2025), Czech actor
- Rudolf Bruner-Dvořák (1864–1921), Czech photographer

== Science ==
- August Dvorak (1894–1975), educational psychologist
- Harold F. Dvorak, American pathologist and vascular researcher
- John C. Dvorak (1946–2026), computer-industry columnist and new-media personality
- Lubomír Dvořák (born 1940), Czech physicist
- Vinko Dvořák (1848–1922), Czech-Croatian physicist
- Vernon Dvorak (1928–2022), meteorologist
- Zdeněk Dvořák (born 1981), Czech mathematician

== Sports ==
- Bedřich Dvořák (1930–2018), Czech canoeist
- Ben Dvorak (1895–1974), American football running back
- Bill Dvořák (born 1958), American pioneering whitewater rafter
- Christian Dvorak (born 1996), American ice hockey player
- David Dvořák (born 1992), Czech mixed-martial artist
- Dominik Dvořák (born 1992), Czech bobsledder
- Dusty Dvorak (born 1958), American volleyball player
- Filip Dvořák (canoeist) (born 1988), Czech canoeist
- Filip Dvořák (ice hockey, born 1976), Czech ice hockey player
- Filip Dvořák (ice hockey, born 1997), Czech ice hockey player
- Libor Dvořák (born 1957), Czech canoeist
- Milan Dvořák (1934–2022), Czech footballer
- Miroslav Dvořák (ice hockey) (1951–2008), Czech ice hockey player
- Miroslav Dvořák (skier) (born 1987), Czech skier
- Oldřich Dvořák (born 1953), Czech wrestler
- Pavel Dvořák (born 1989), Czech footballer
- Radek Dvořák (born 1977), Czech ice hockey player
- Tomáš Dvořák (born 1972), Czech decathlon and heptathlon athlete
- Veronika Dvořáková (born 2000), Czech handball player

== Other ==
- Denisa Dvořáková (born 1989), Czech model
- Edwin Dvorak (1929–2004), American politician
- Oskar Dvořák (born 1991), Slovak politician

== People with related surnames ==
- Gábor Dvorschák (born 1989), Hungarian footballer
- Henry Dworshak (1894–1962), American politician
- Leo Ferdinand Dworschak (1900–1976), American bishop

== See also ==
- Dvorak (disambiguation)
