= Lukáš Dvořák =

Lukáš Dvořák may refer to:

- Lukáš Dvořák (photographer) (born 1982), Czech photographer
- Lukáš Dvořák (footballer) (born 1984), Czech footballer
