= Poshuouinge =

Pueblo ruins site in Rio Arriba County, New Mexico

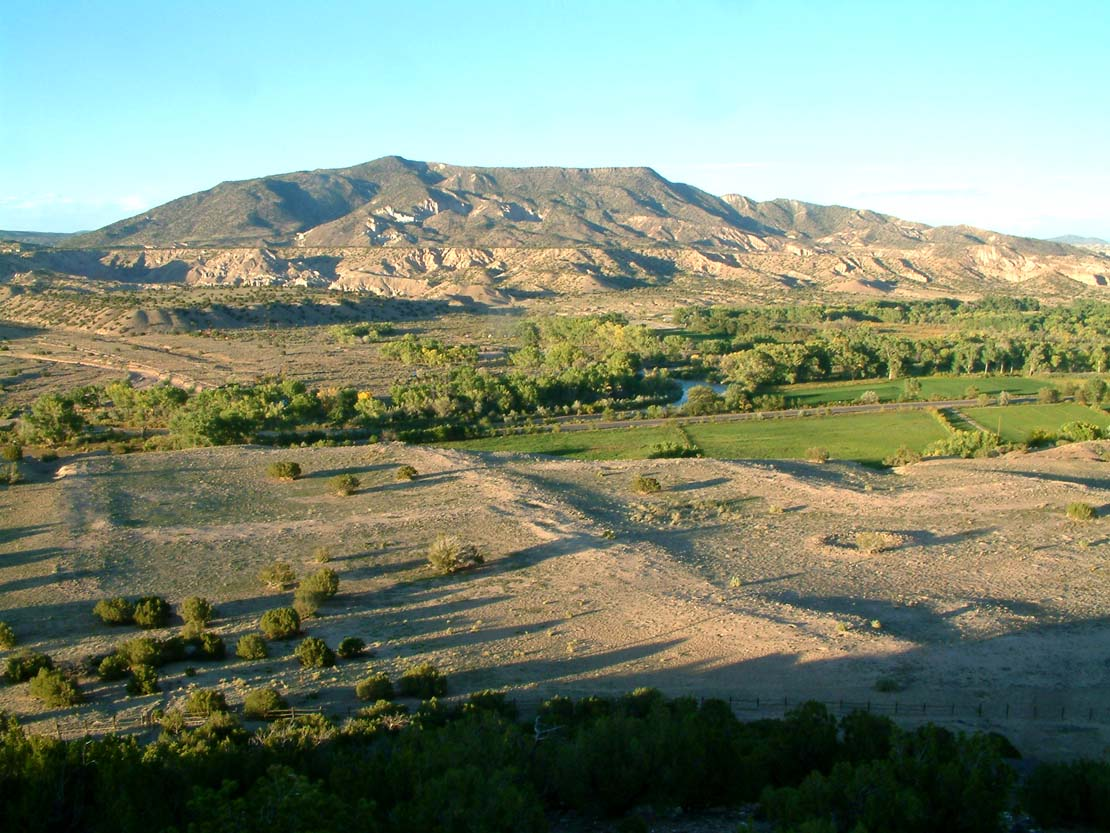
Poshuouinge in 2011

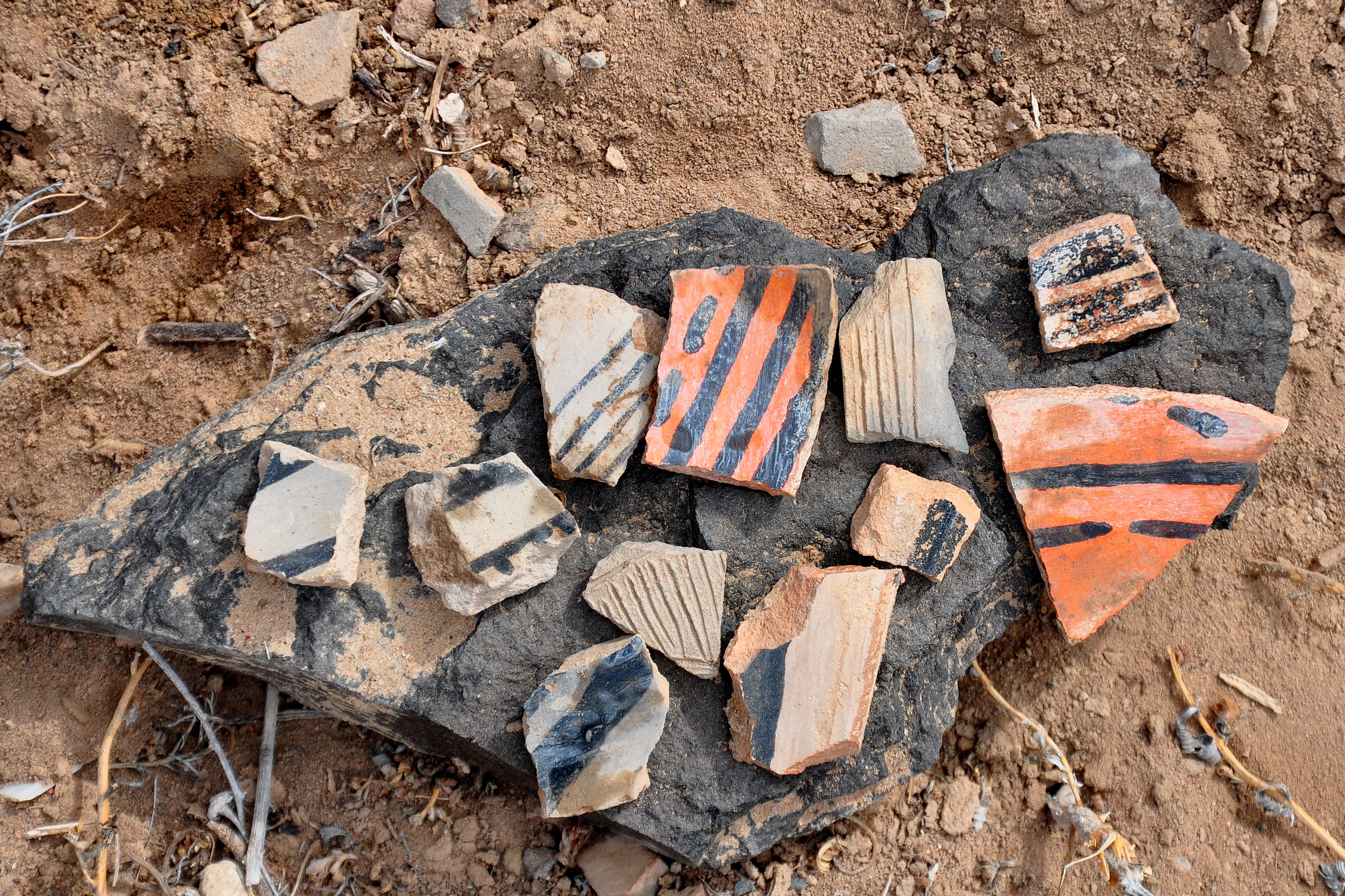
Poshuouinge potsherds

Poshuouinge (Note: /ˈpoʊʃuːˈwɪŋɡeɪ/ POH-shoo-WING-gay) (Tewa: Pʼoshúˀ Ówîngeh Kayyee, pronounced [pʼòʃúʔ ʔówîŋɡè kèːjìː], lit. 'water point village ruin') is a large ancestral Pueblo ruin located on U.S. Route 84, about 2.5 miles (4.0 km) south of Abiquiu, New Mexico. Its builders were the ancestors of the Tewa Pueblos who now (2011) reside in Santa Clara Pueblo and San Juan Pueblo. It has also been referred to informally as Turquoise Ruin, although there is no evidence that turquoise has ever been found in the area. Poshuouinge is situated 3 miles (4.8 km) upstream and due west of another Tewa Pueblo ancestral site, Tsama.

== Geography ==
Poshuouinge was built on a high mesa, some 150 feet (46 m) above the Chama River, around 1400. There are two springs located about 500 feet (150 m) to the south of the ruins which are believed to have been the main water sources for the habitation. It is accessible by a United States Department of Agriculture Forest Service trail.

This pueblo, at its largest, consisted of about 700 ground floor rooms, most being two or even three stories tall. The pueblo was laid out with two main plazas, and a large kiva near the center of the eastern courtyard. The barrow pits of Poshuouinge were planted with small stone grids in the basement.

== History ==
The pueblo is believed to have been occupied between 1375 and 1475. The site was abandoned around 1500, well before Coronado and the first Europeans arrived. It is believed that its inhabitants left the banks of the Chama River and relocated nearby around the Rio Grande, where their descendants live today.

== Archaeology ==
Adolph Bandelier excavated the area in 1885. Jean Allard Jeancon and his Tewa workmen unearthed tzii-wi war axes whilst excavating the site in 1919. Jeançon was said "to have interpreted the Poshuouinge shrines in light of ethnographic evidence, arguing that they represented a "world quarter system" similar to that of San Juan Pueblo."

Coordinates: 36°12′44″N 106°16′26″W

== Gallery ==
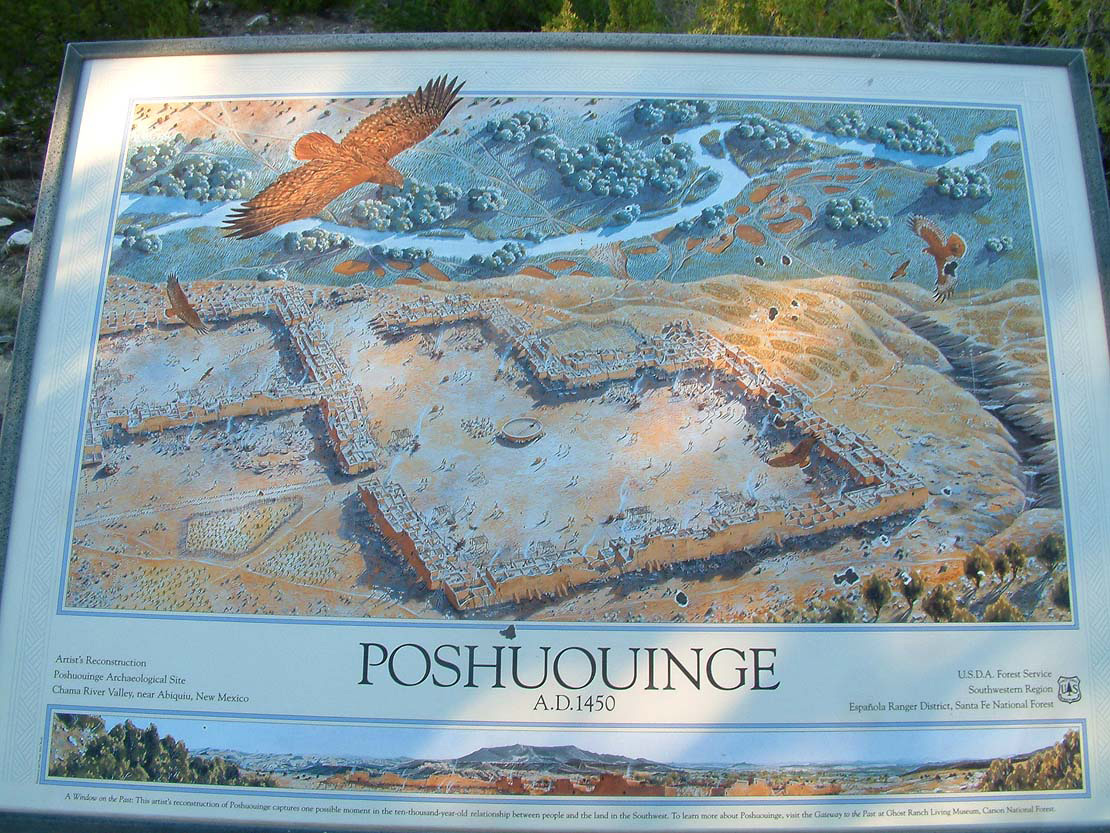
USDA Forest Service rendering of the ruins

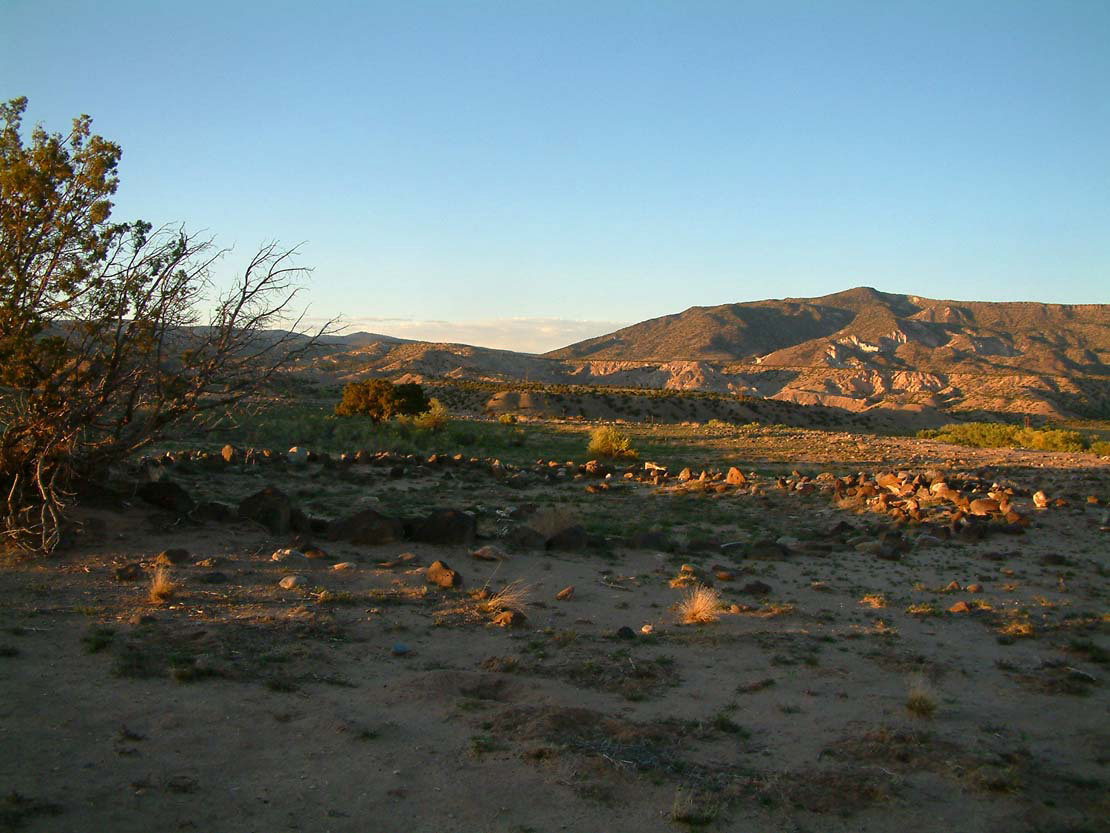
Kiva

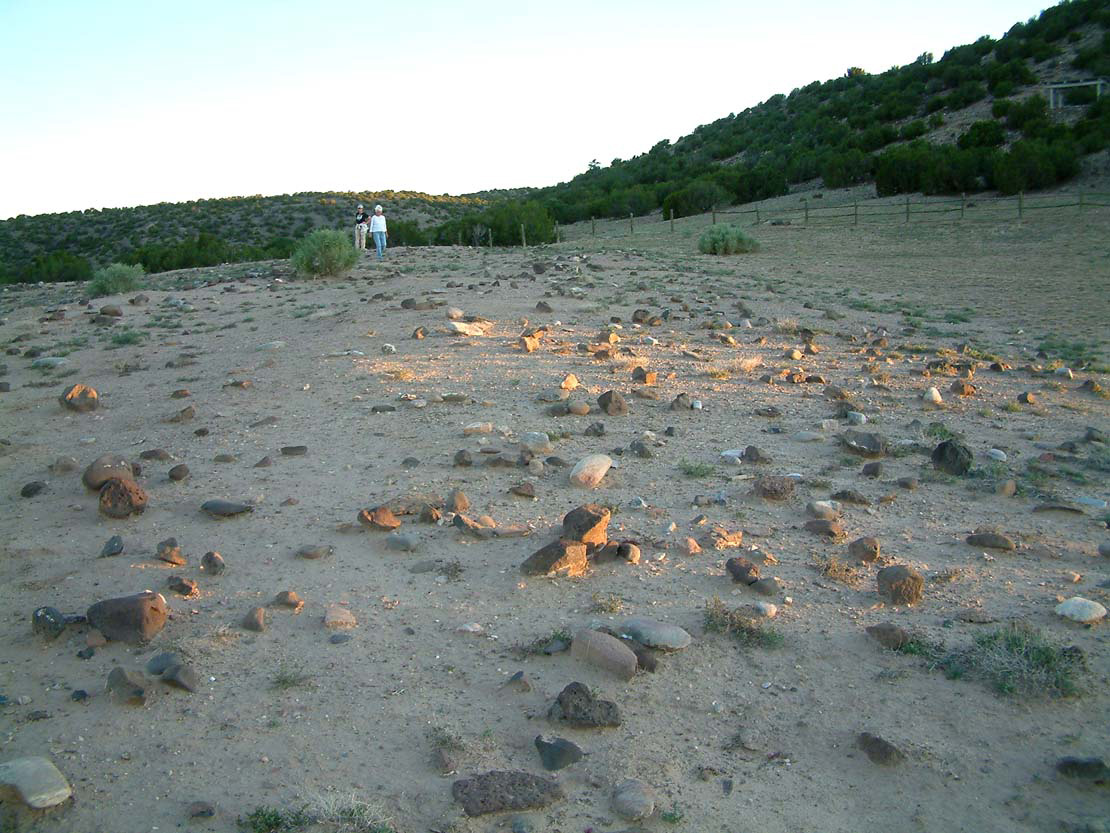
What remains of the buildings
