= Eric J. Will =

American politician (1959–2008)

Member of the Nebraska Legislature from the 8th district
- In office January 9, 1991 – January 6, 1999
- Preceded by: Sharon Beck
- Succeeded by: Patrick Bourne

Personal details
- Born: April 16, 1959 Omaha, Nebraska
- Died: August 10, 2008 (aged 49) Omaha, Nebraska
- Party: Democratic
- Education: University of Southern California (B.A.); Creighton University (J.D.)

Eric J. Will (April 16, 1959 – August 10, 2008) was a Democratic politician from Nebraska who served as a member of the Nebraska Legislature from 1991 to 1999.

== Early career ==
Will was born in Omaha, Nebraska, and graduated from Omaha Northwest High School in 1977. He attended the University of Southern California, graduating with his bachelor's degree in 1981, and later attended the Creighton University School of Law, receiving his Juris Doctor, though he did not practice law. He worked as a legislative aide to State Senator Vard Johnson and for the legislature's Revenue Committee, which was chaired by Johnson until he resigned, and later by Senator Tim Hall.

== Nebraska Legislature ==
In 1990, Will ran for the legislature from the Omaha-based 8th district, challenging incumbent Republican Senator Sharon Beck, who had been appointed to replace Johnson when he resigned in 1989. Beck placed first in the primary election over Will, receiving 59 percent of the vote to Will's 41 percent. In the general election, Will narrowly defeated Beck, 53–47 percent, winning by 610 votes. The race was formally nonpartisan, but Beck was supported by the Nebraska Coalition for Life, a pro-life group, and Will "was endorsed as a pro-choice candidate."

Will ran for re-election in 1994, and was challenged by John Folsom, an investment consultant supported by local Republicans. Will placed first in the primary over Folsom, winning 54 percent of the vote to Will's 46 percent. In the general election, Folsom attacked Will over his drunken driving arrest from the previous year. Folsom alleged that Will had received free legal representation from his attorney, a registered lobbyist, which violated a state law prohibiting legislators from accepting more than fifty dollars from registered lobbyists. Will denied the charge, and responded that he had paid for his legal representation. Will ultimately defeated Folsom by a wide margin, winning re-election 55–45 percent.

== Post-legislative career ==
In 1998, Will opted against seeking a third term in the Legislature, and instead ran for Douglas County Treasurer. He won the Democratic nomination, and challenged incumbent Republican Julie Haney. Will campaigned on improving the quality and convenience of services, arguing that his experience in the legislature would be an asset. Will lost to Haney in a landslide, receiving just 28 percent of the vote to Haney's 72 percent.

== Death ==
Will died on August 10, 2008.
