= Linda S. Cordell =

American archaeologist and anthropologist

Linda Sue Cordell
- Born: October 11, 1943; New York City, New York
- Died: March 29, 2013 (aged 69); Santa Fe, New Mexico
- Awards: National Academy of Sciences 2005 Anthropology; Academy of Arts and Sciences 2008 Anthropology and Archaeology

Academic background
- Education: UC Santa Barbara; University of Oregon; George Washington University

Academic work
- Discipline: Archaeology; Anthropology
- Institutions: University of Colorado; California Academy of Sciences; University of New Mexico
- Main interests: pre-Columbian history of the Southwestern United States

Linda Sue Cordell (October 11, 1943 - March 29, 2013) was an American archaeologist and anthropologist. She was a leading researcher of the archaeology of the Southwest United States and Ancestral Pueblo communities. She authored a number of notable books familiar to both the general public and scholars, including the Prehistory of the Southwest. Cordell was well recognized for her mentorship and leadership in the field; she received many awards and honors throughout her career, including being elected to the National Academies of Sciences and the American Academy of Arts and Sciences, and an endowed Peabody Award was named in honor of her in 2014.

== Early life and education ==
Cordell was born in New York City, NY October 11, 1943. She was exposed to the sciences early on, her father Harry Seinfeld was a pharmacist and her mother Evelyn S. Kessler, earned her Ph.D. in anthropology from Columbia University and was a professor of anthropology at the University of South Florida. In 1965 Cordell graduated with distinction and Phi Beta Kappa from George Washington University. It was during time that she was introduced to Southwest Archaeology, when she was invited to join an exclusive school trip to Florence Hawley Ellis’s University of New Mexico field school at the pueblo of Sapawe. After completing her bachelor's degree Cordell moved to the University of Oregon and earned a master's. She then complete her PhD in 1972 at the University of California, Santa Barbara, working on one of the first archeological projects that implemented statistical methods.

== Career ==
Cordell was a longtime academic researcher and professor. After completion of her PhD, she moved to the University of New Mexico where she remained until 1987. Then she moved to the California Academy of Sciences where she was the Irvine Curator and Chair of the Anthropology Department until 1993. Cordell was also a visiting professor at Stanford University in 1990. Finally, Cordell moved to the University of Colorado where she was appointed Professor of Anthropology and Director of the University of Colorado Museum of Natural History. She remained her until she retired in 2013. On March 29, 2013, Linda S. Cordell died in her home in Santa Fe while working on a scientific paper.

Cordell's research focused on the pre-Columbian history of the Southwestern United States. She was particularly interested in the anthropology of the Pueblo Indians, their social organization, their migration and demography and their culture (especially ceramics). In the field of archaeobotany Cordell dealt with the distribution and use of the corn plant. In addition, she wrote various books on the archaeology of the Southwest or the Pueblo Indians in general. She was also extremely active in teaching, mentorship and the representation of women in the field of archaeology.

== Awards and honors ==
- 2009 – Lifetime Achievement Award from the Society for American Archaeology
- 2008 – Elected to the American Academy of Arts and Sciences
- 2005 – Elected to the National Academies of Sciences
- 2001 – A.V. Kidder Award from the American Anthropological Association
