= Kate L. Fick Jeancon =

- Born: Katherine Llwyn DIxon Woodcock; June 5, 1884; Cornwallis, Manitoba, Canada
- Died: September 2, 1969 (age 85); San Diego, California, U.S.
- Other names: Kate Fick, Kate Perkins, Kate Marcellus
- Occupation: Court reporter
- Relatives: Jean Allard Jeancon (brother-in-law)

Katherine Llwyn Fick Jeancon Marcellus (née Woodcock; June 5, 1884 – September 2, 1969) was a Canadian-American stenographer and court reporter. She was the first woman to hold the position of court reporter in Winnipeg, Vancouver, and San Diego courts.

== Early life ==
Kate Woodcock was born in 1884 in Cornwallis, Manitoba, Canada, the daughter of Thomas Dixon Woodcock and Emma Eleanor Hardy Woodcock.

== Career ==
In 1908, Jeancon became the first female court reporter in Winnipeg. She later became the first woman to hold the position in Vancouver, and, after moving to San Diego, California, in 1914, the first in the San Diego Superior Courts. In 1932 she was named official reporter for the Sixth Superior Court, under Judge Arthur Mundo. She was still the "only woman court stenographer" in San Diego in 1937, when she told a newspaper reporter, "I know it sounds like an awful job. But I never get tired of it." She retired in 1949, after 35 years of court reporting.

She was a member of the San Diego Business & Professional Women's Club.

== Personal life ==
Jeancon married John Law Perkins in Canada in 1902. They had one son, Francis Jackson Perkins, who became a dentist. She was known as "Mrs. Kate Fick" in 1915 and 1920. She married playwright and musical director Otto Lemcke Jeancon (brother of anthropologist Jean Allard Jeancon), in 1921 in California. He died from acute kidney disease in 1925. She took a 9,000-mile automobile trip through 28 states with Mr. and Mrs. M. B. Keyser in 1928. Her last husband, George Albert Marcellus, died in 1947. She died in 1969, at the age of 85, in San Diego.
