= Tsama Pueblo =

- U.S. National Register of Historic Places
- NM State Register of Cultural Properties
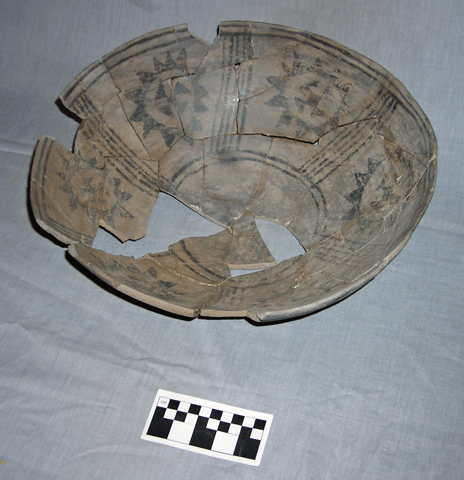
- Tsama bowl, an example of Rio Grande White Ware
- Nearest city: Abiquiú, New Mexico
- Coordinates: 36°11′43″N 106°12′52″W
- Area: 24.3 acres (9.8 ha)
- NRHP reference No.: 83004158
- NMSRCP No.: 929

Significant dates
- Added to NRHP: November 17, 1983
- Designated NMSRCP: August 25, 1983

Tsama Pueblo (Tewa: Tsâmâ Ówîngeh Kayyee, pronounced [tsɑ̂mɑ̂ ʔówîŋɡè kèːjìː], transl. 'they wrestled village ruin') (Note: Also seen as Tsámaˀówîngeh) is a Tewa Pueblo ancestral site in an address-restricted area of Abiquiú, New Mexico, on a terrace above the Rio Chama floodplain near its confluence with El Rito Creek. It was occupied from around 1250 until the 1500s, possibly into the Spanish period. The pueblo contained 1,100 rooms, inhabited by a maximum of 1150 to 1300 people. Like other ancestral Tewa pueblos, the pueblo was initially divided into blocks which may have corresponded to the two traditional moieties of the Tewa.

The site and others in the area were explored by Florence Hawley Ellis in the 1960s and 1970s. In 1983, it was listed on the National Register of Historic Places listings in Rio Arriba County, New Mexico. Tsama is located 3 miles (4.8 km) from the Poshuouinge site, and the Sapawe site is closely related. In December 2008, The Archaeological Conservancy extended the Tsama Archaeological Preserve by 11.6523 acres, mostly cobble mulch garden plots which were likely once constructed by the residents of Tsama Pueblo.

According to Scott Ortman, pottery remains at Tsama have a high proportion of features and motifs associated with Mesa Verde archaeological sites, namely iconography linking pottery with woven baskets, which is rare at the sites founded earlier or concurrently on the Pajarito Plateau. Under his hypothesis of Tewa migration from Mesa Verde to the upper Rio Grande, Ortman argues that the Pajarito sites were populated by earlier emigrants who rapidly innovated upon their arrival in the Tewa Basin, while Tsama represents a late settlement by a large group of Mesa Verde holdouts who retained more traditional motifs from their homeland.

== See also ==
- National Register of Historic Places listings in Rio Arriba County, New Mexico
