= D11 motorway (Czech Republic) =

Czech motorway

Coordinates: 50°6′59.62″N 15°12′9.01″E

D11 Motorway
- Dálnice D11

Route information
- Part of
- Length: 115 km (71 mi) Planned: 156 km (97 mi)

Major junctions
- From: D0 in Prague
- D35 near Hradec Králové
- To: S3 border with Poland

Location
- Country: Czech Republic
- Regions: Prague, Central Bohemian, Pardubice, Hradec Králové
- Major cities: Prague, Hradec Králové

Highway system
- Highways in the Czech Republic
← D10	→ D35

The D11 motorway (Czech: Dálnice D11) is a motorway in the Czech Republic connecting Prague to Pardubice region and Hradec Králové region to the border with Poland near Trutnov where it continues as Expressway S3 (Poland) to Legnica and Szczecin.

The section of the motorway from Prague to Hradec Králové and Jaroměř is part of European route E67 Via Baltica from Prague in the Czech Republic, to Helsinki in Finland, passing towns and cities in Poland, Lithuania, Latvia and Estonia.

Around Hradec Králové, the D11 runs in concurrently with the D35 (between the Sedlice and the Plotiště interchanges).

== History ==
Plans to build a highway connecting Prague and Hradec Králové date from 1938. Construction began in 1978, with sections 1101 (Prague-Jirny) and 1102/I (Jirny–Bříství) put into operation in October 1984. The second oldest 8.2-kilometre-long (5.1 mi) section, 1102/II (Bříství–Třebestovice) was put into operation a year later, in October 1985.

In 2009, the connecting section of the D35 motorway Sedlice (MÚK with D11) - Opatovice nad Labem (MÚK with I/37) was put into operation. This significantly accelerated the connection to Pardubice and the southern parts of Hradec Králové.

In 2017, the motorway was finally brought to Hradec Králové. In 2018 and 2019, there was an expansion to 6 lanes between Horní Počernice and Jirny, but only four lanes are still in use.

Sections between Hradec Králové - Smiřice and Smiřice - Jaroměř, which construction started in 2018, were opened in December 2021.

Three lanes in each direction are planned by 2025 between Prague and Jirny (8 km) and to Poděbrady after 2025.

=== Future plans ===
As the S3 expressway connecting the Polish side was finished before the Czech D11, further postponement of completion of the motorway to the Polish border is undesirable. Almost all the land for section 1109 (Trutnov - state border with Poland) has already been purchased. Construction was originally scheduled to start at the end of 2023, and the contractor was selected in November 2023. However, a month later, an objection was filed against the selection of the most advantageous bid. This final section is yet to be started, with completion expected in 2027 at earliest.

Section 1108 Jaroměř – Trutnov; a 19.6-kilometre-long (12.2 mi) segment is planned. The construction should commence in 2025, in order to be put into operation in time for 2028.

With the completion of the Polish S3, and after completion of the border section of D11 and the transfer of international traffic for E65 and E67 from Harrachov and Náchod to Královec, congestion is expected on road 37.

== Route description ==
Country	Region	Location	km	mi	Exit	Name	Destinations	Notes
Czech Republic	Prague	Prague	0	0.0	—			Kilometrage starting point
Czech Republic	Prague	Prague	1	0.62	—	Dálniční křižovatka Horní Počernice	D0 E67	
Czech Republic	Prague	Prague			Rest area	Odpočívka Beranka		
Czech Republic	Central Bohemian Region	Central Bohemian Region	8	5.0	—	Jirny		
Czech Republic	Central Bohemian Region	Central Bohemian Region	18	11	—	Bříství		
Czech Republic	Central Bohemian Region	Central Bohemian Region			Rest area	Odpočívka Bříství		
Czech Republic	Central Bohemian Region	Central Bohemian Region	25	16	—	Sadská		
Czech Republic	Central Bohemian Region	Central Bohemian Region	35	22	—	Vrbová Lhota		
Czech Republic	Central Bohemian Region	Central Bohemian Region			Rest area	Odpočívka Vrbová Lhota		
Czech Republic	Central Bohemian Region	Central Bohemian Region	39	24	—	Kluk		
Czech Republic	Central Bohemian Region	Central Bohemian Region	42	26	—	Libice		
Czech Republic	Central Bohemian Region	Central Bohemian Region	40	25	—	Dobšice		
Czech Republic	Hradec Králové Region	Hradec Králové Region	62	39	—	Chlumec nad Cidlinou		
Czech Republic	Hradec Králové Region	Hradec Králové Region	68	42	—	Chýšť		
Czech Republic	Hradec Králové Region	Hradec Králové Region	76	47	—	Pravy		
Czech Republic	Hradec Králové Region	Hradec Králové Region			Rest area	Odpočívka Osice		
Czech Republic	Hradec Králové Region	Hradec Králové Region	84	52	—	Dálniční křižovatka Sedlice	D35 E442	
Czech Republic	Hradec Králové Region	Hradec Králové Region	90	56	—	Kukleny		
Czech Republic	Hradec Králové Region	Hradec Králové Region	95	59	—	Dálniční křižovatka Plotiště	D35 E442 I/11 I/35	
Czech Republic	Hradec Králové Region	Hradec Králové Region	104	65	—	Smiřice	I/33	
Czech Republic	Hradec Králové Region	Hradec Králové Region	108	67	—	Jaroměř-jih	I/33 E67	
Czech Republic	Hradec Králové Region	Hradec Králové Region	113	70	—	Jaroměř-sever	I/37	Temporary end of the motorway (other sections in preparation)
Czech Republic	Hradec Králové Region	Hradec Králové Region	117	73	—	Choustníkovo Hradiště		In preparation
Czech Republic	Hradec Králové Region	Hradec Králové Region	123	76	—	Kocbeře		In preparation
Czech Republic	Hradec Králové Region	Hradec Králové Region			Rest area	Odpočívka Brusnice		In preparation
Czech Republic	Hradec Králové Region	Hradec Králové Region	134	83	—	Střítež		In construction, planned for 2028
Czech Republic	Hradec Králové Region	Hradec Králové Region	140	87	—	Poříčí		In construction, planned for 2028
Czech Republic	Hradec Králové Region	Hradec Králové Region	140	87	—	Poříčí		In construction, planned for 2028
Czech Republic	Hradec Králové Region	Hradec Králové Region			Rest area	Odpočívka Bernartice		In construction, planned for 2028
Czech Republic	Hradec Králové Region	Hradec Králové Region	152	94	—	Královec		In construction, planned for 2026
Czech Republic	Hradec Králové Region	Hradec Králové Region	152	94	—	Královec		In construction, planned for 2026
Czech Republic	Hradec Králové Region	Hradec Králové Region	154	96	—	Královec/Lubawka border crossing	S 3 E67	In construction, planned for 2026 Kilometrage end point Border crossing; road continues as the Polish S3
1.000 mi = 1.609 km; 1.000 km = 0.621 mi: Proposed; Route transition; Unopened

== Images ==
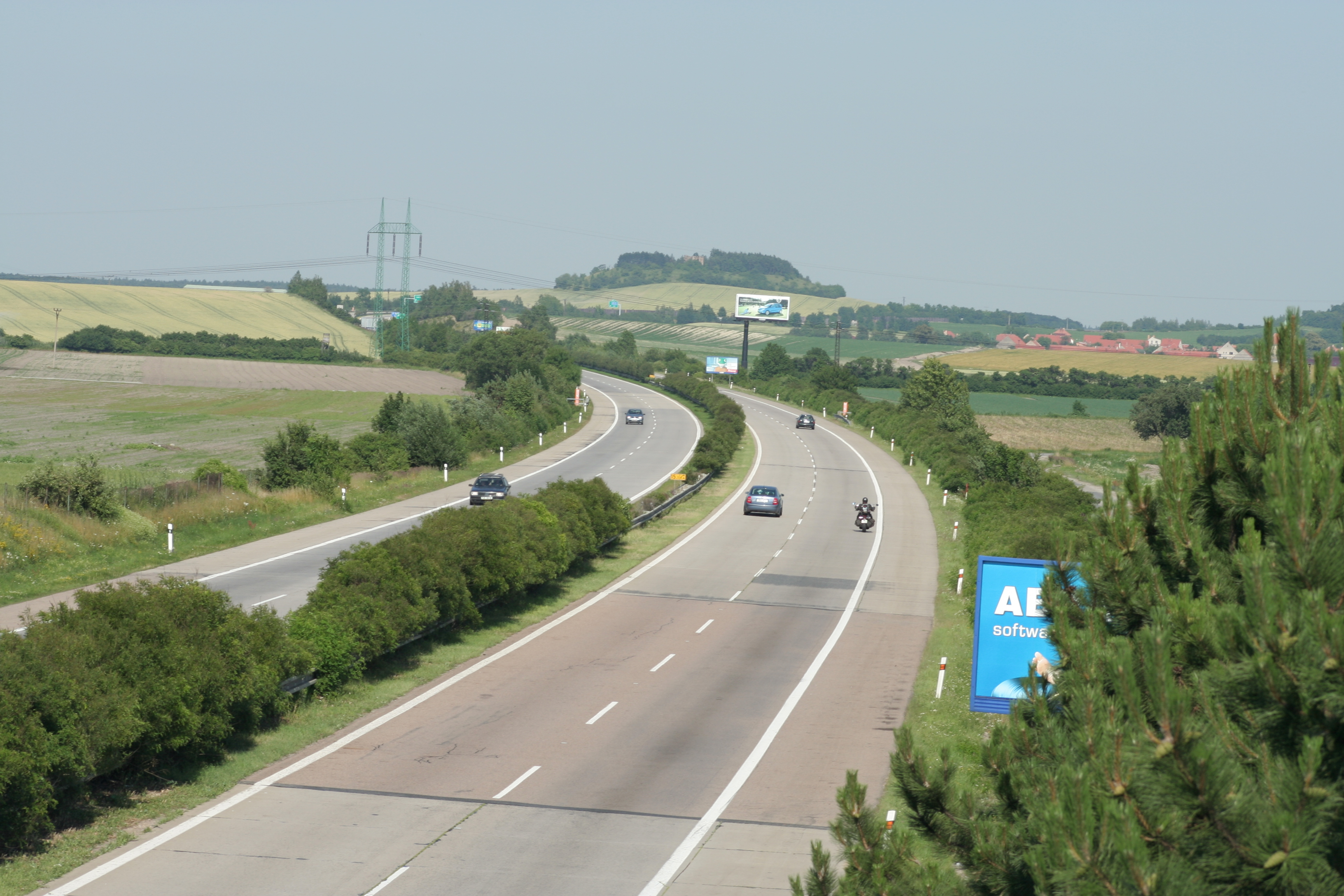
D11 motorway near Bříství, Nymburk District.

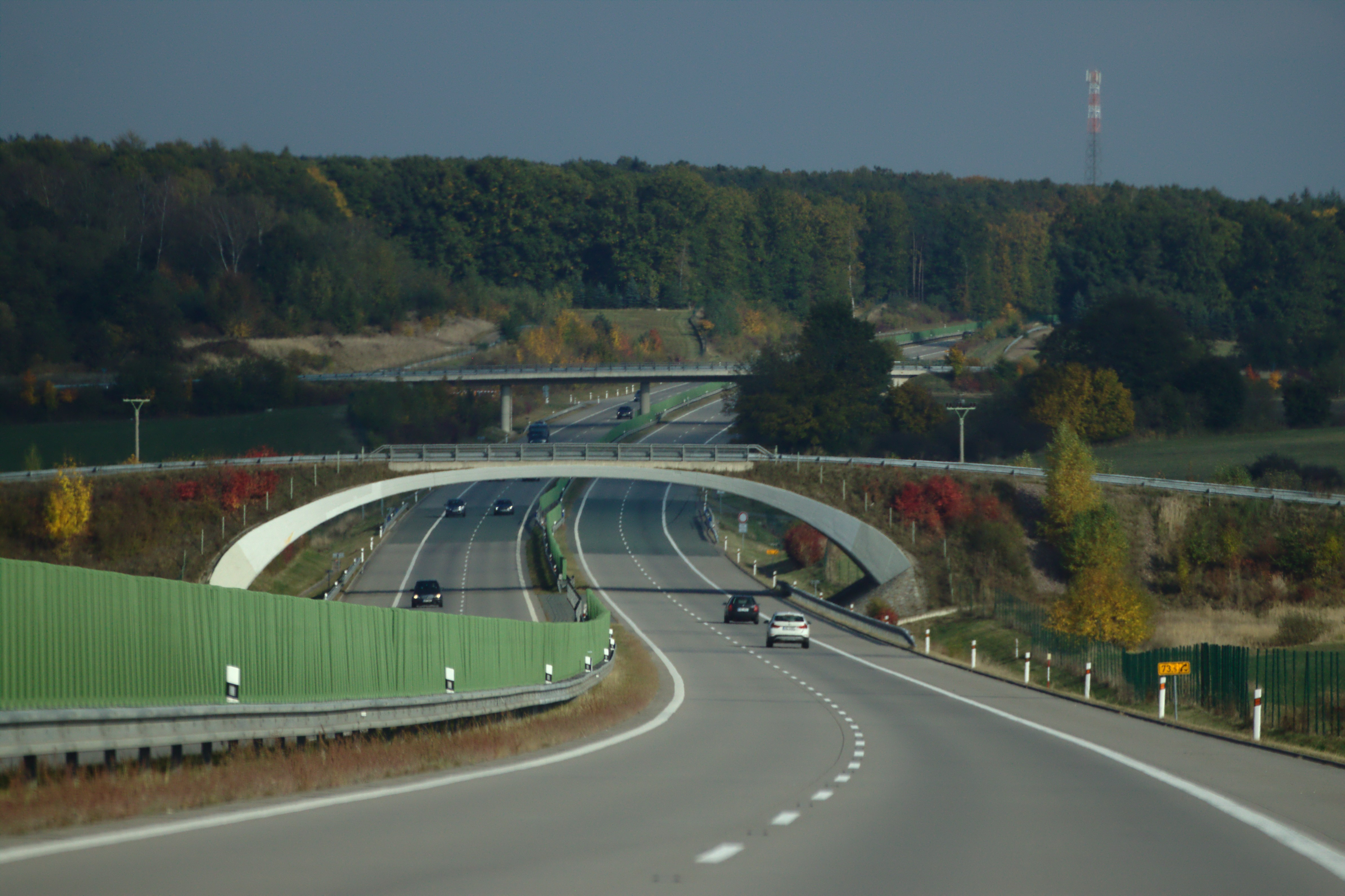
D11 motorway near Voleč, Pardubice Region.

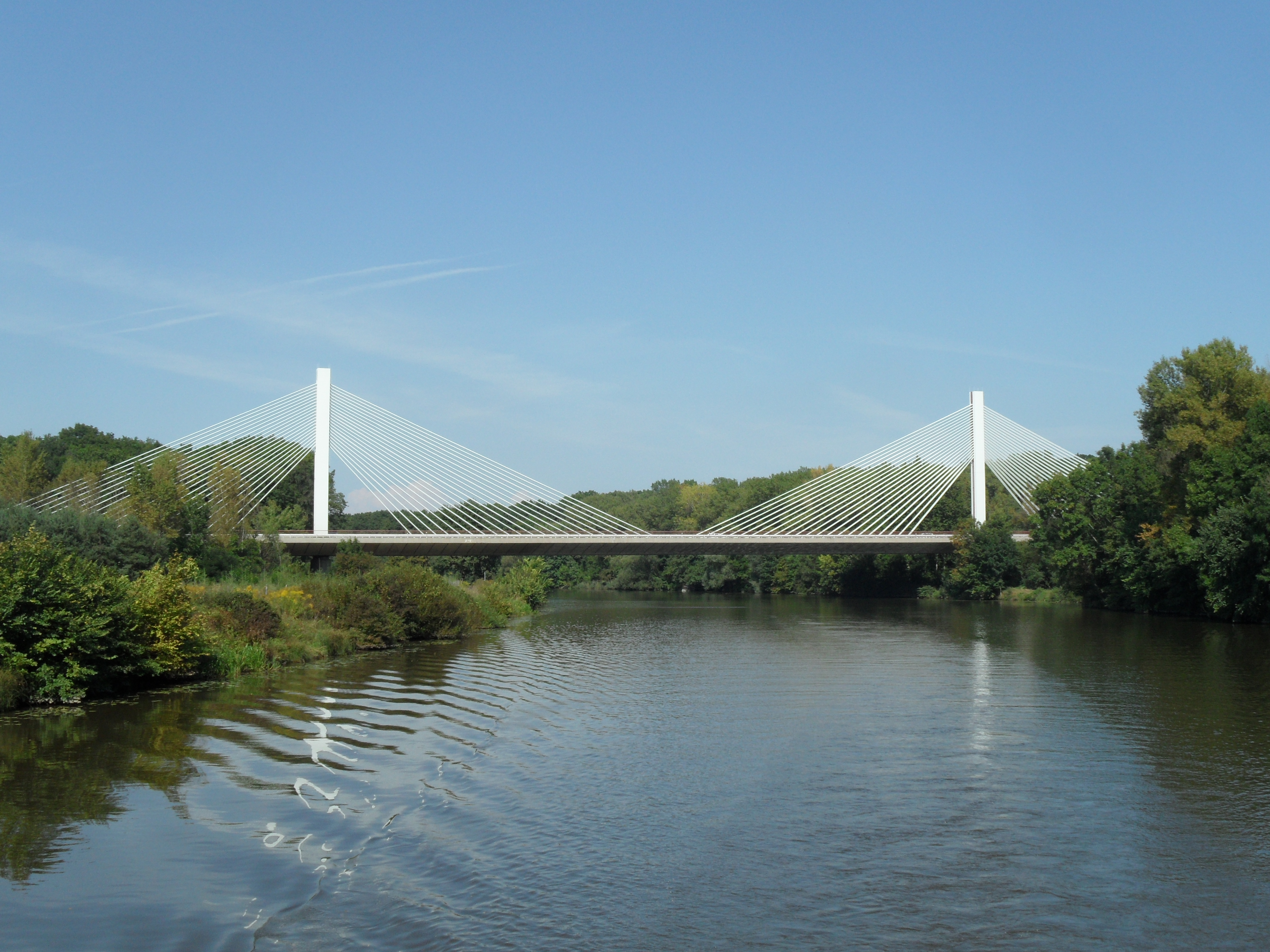
Bridge on D11 near Poděbrady
