= Sapawe =

Sapawe may refer to:

- Eva Marion Lake, Ontario
- Sapawe, New Mexico
