= Dvořáček =

Dvořáček (feminine: Dvořáčková) is a Czech surname, a diminutive form of the surname Dvořák. Notable people with the surname include:

- Alois Dvořáček (1909–?), Czech basketball player
- David Dvořáček (born 1992), Czech ice hockey player
- Dusty Dvoracek (born 1981), American football player
- Hermann Dvoracek (1920–?), Austrian footballer
- Josef Dvořáček (born 1952), Czech table tennis player
- Ladislav Dvořáček (1923–2015), Czech philatelist
- Ludvík Dvořáček (1910–1963), Czech basketball player
- Vladimír Dvořáček (1934–1983), Czech ice hockey player
