= Filip Dvořák =

Filip Dvořák may refer to:

- Filip Dvořák (canoeist) (born 1988), Czech canoeist
- Filip Dvořák (ice hockey, born 1976), Czech ice hockey player
- Filip Dvořák (ice hockey, born 1997), Czech ice hockey player
