= Sharon Beck (Nebraska politician) =

American politician (1937–2013)

Member of the Nebraska Legislature from the 8th district
- In office January 4, 1989 – January 9, 1991
- Preceded by: Vard Johnson
- Succeeded by: Eric J. Will

Personal details
- Born: November 14, 1937 Omaha, Nebraska
- Died: December 26, 2013 (aged 76) Chattanooga, Tennessee
- Party: Republican
- Spouse: Bill D. Beck (m. 1956)
- Children: 4 (Clayton, Curtis, Clint, Christine)
- Education: Peru State College; Doane College (B.A.); Chadron State College (M.S.)
- Occupation: Teacher

Sharon Kay Reagan Beck (November 14, 1937 – December 26, 2013) was a Republican politician from Nebraska who served as a member of the Nebraska Legislature from the 8th district from 1989 to 1991.

== Early career ==
Sharon Reagan was born in Omaha, Nebraska, in 1937, and graduated from Bratton Union Rural Consolidated High School in 1955. She later attended Peru State College from 1955 to 1957, and graduated from Doane College with her bachelor's degree in 1962. She married Bill Beck in 1956, and had four children, later returning to school and graduating from Chadron State College with her master's degree in 1980. Beck worked as a teacher, and taught English and literature at Midwestern Baptist Academy. She was active in the local Republican Party, serving as a member of the Douglas County Republican Party Central Committee, and was a pro-life activist.

== Nebraska Legislature ==
In 1986, Beck ran for the Nebraska Legislature against State Senator Vard Johnson, a Democrat, who represented the Omaha-based 8th district. She was joined in the primary by attorney Horace Reynolds IV and railroad administrator George Davis. Beck argued that Johnson had an "inconsistent approach" in the legislature, and attacked him for proposing a sales tax on utility services. Johnson narrowly placed first in the primary, winning 40 percent of the vote to Beck's 39 percent, and they both advanced to the general election.

In the general election, Beck campaigned as a social conservative and a supporter of the death penalty, noting, "The unborn has no judge, no jury, no appeal[.]" Johnson raised the most money out of any legislative candidate statewide, and significantly outraised and outspent Beck. In the final days of the campaign, U.S. Senator Edward Zorinsky, a conservative Democrat, said that he "would vote for" Beck "if [he] lived in that district." Ultimately, Johnson narrowly defeated Beck, winning re-election with 52 percent of the vote.

In 1988, Johnson announced that he would resign from his seat in the legislature, effective 1989. Governor Kay Orr appointed Beck as Johnson's successor, and she was sworn in on January 4, 1989.

Beck ran for re-election in 1990, and was challenged by Eric J. Will, a former legislative aide to Johnson. In the primary election, Beck placed first over Will by a wide margin, winning 59–41 percent, and they both advanced to the general election. The candidates' positions on abortion was a defining issue of the campaign; Beck was endorsed by the Nebraska Coalition for Life, while Will ran on his support for abortion rights. Beck was narrowly defeated by Will, receiving 47 percent to his 53 percent.

== Death ==
Beck died on December 26, 2013, in Chattanooga, Tennessee.
