= Josef Hojný =

Czech sport shooter

Personal information
- Nationality: Czech
- Born: 2 December 1958 (age 67) Smiřice, Czechoslovakia

Sport
- Sport: Sport shooting

Josef Hojný (born 2 December 1958) is a Czech sport shooter. He competed in the mixed trap event at the 1980 Summer Olympics.
