= Jean Allard Jeancon =

American anthropologist

Jean Allard Jeançon (December 14, 1874 – April 11, 1936) was an American anthropologist. He conducted archaeological work in the American Southwest, including Chimney Rock, Colorado, and the Lower Río Chama Valley in northwestern New Mexico.

== Early life and education ==
Jeançon was born in Newport, Kentucky on December 14, 1874, to a French father, Jean Allard Jeançon Sr., and German mother, Matilde Louise Lemcke. He was educated in Newport, Kentucky before studying abroad in Germany and France, and returned to Newport for one year of high school. He studied music at the College of Music of Cincinnati and Kentucky College of Music before receiving a doctoral degree from the National Conservatory of Music of American in New York City.

== Career ==
Jeançon served as a private and musician during the Spanish-American War with the Kentucky Infantry and as First Lieutenant with the Colorado National Guard. In 1904, he became interested in archaeology after spending four weeks with the Tewa people in New Mexico, and later became the supervisor of the Manitou Cliff Ruins in Colorado. In 1922, he received a B.A. degree from the University of Denver, where he taught archaeology and ethnology as well as directing excavation camps in conjunction with the Colorado State Museum. His archaeological work was mostly conducted in Colorado, New Mexico, and Arizona from the 1910s to early 1930s. This work is related to prehistoric and historic Native American tribes including the Utes, Pueblos, and Navajos.

He is most known for his work excavating at Chimney Rock, Colorado, where he and his team discovered many artifacts that were added to the State Historical Society collections. In 1921, they worked at multiple sites in this area including the Guard House and the Great House Pueblo. Jeançon and Frank H. H. Roberts began working together in 1922 to survey the area and continue excavations, and their work continued into the early 1930s.

His excavations at Poshuouinge in the Río Chama Valley in 1919 were conducted through the auspices of the Bureau of American Ethnology and funded by Otto Tod Mallery, a noted economist in Philadelphia, Pennsylvania. Some of the artifacts from Jeançon's work in the Lower Río Chama Valley and later, along the Pecos River, were donated by Mallery to the University of Pennsylvania's Penn Museum. A very few artifacts were donated by Jeançon himself to the Colorado Springs Pioneers Museum, in Colorado Springs, Colorado.

== Death ==
Jeançon died on April 11, 1936, in Denver, Colorado at the Oakes Nursing Home after a long illness. He was cremated and buried on April 28, 1936, in Colorado Springs at the Jeançon family plot.

== Works ==
- Archaeological research in the northwestern San Juan Basin of Colorado during the summer of 1921 (1922)
- Excavations in the Chama Valley, New Mexico (1923)
- Indian Song Book (1924)
- Archeological investigations in the Taos Valley, New Mexico, during 1920 (1929)
- A Handbook of the Pueblo Indians (unpublished)
