= Bill Dvorak =

United States whitewater rafting guide

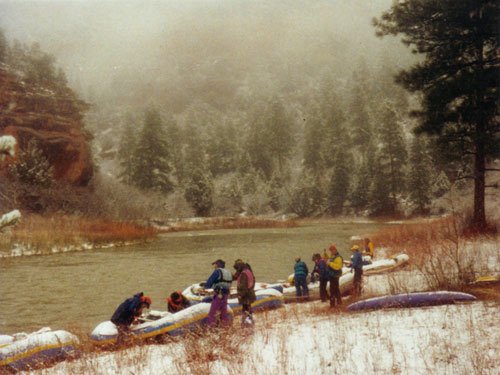
Bill (yellow jacket) on an early Spring training trip down the Rio Chama, in New Mexico.

Bill Dvorak is a Salida, Colorado-based whitewater rafting outfitter. He is best known for organizing multi-day rafting trips on the Dolores and Green Rivers where professional classical musicians give nightly concerts. He claims to be a fifth cousin of classical composer Antonín Dvořák.

He grew up on a ranch in Wyoming and founded his river guiding company, Dvorak Expeditions, in 1979. During the 1980s, Dvorak Expeditions was one of the first companies to organize rafting trips for fishers on the Gunnison River. He has worked as a public land organizer for the National Wildlife Federation and advocated against the diversion of water from the Gunnison River to cities in Colorado.
