= Jirny =

- Municipality
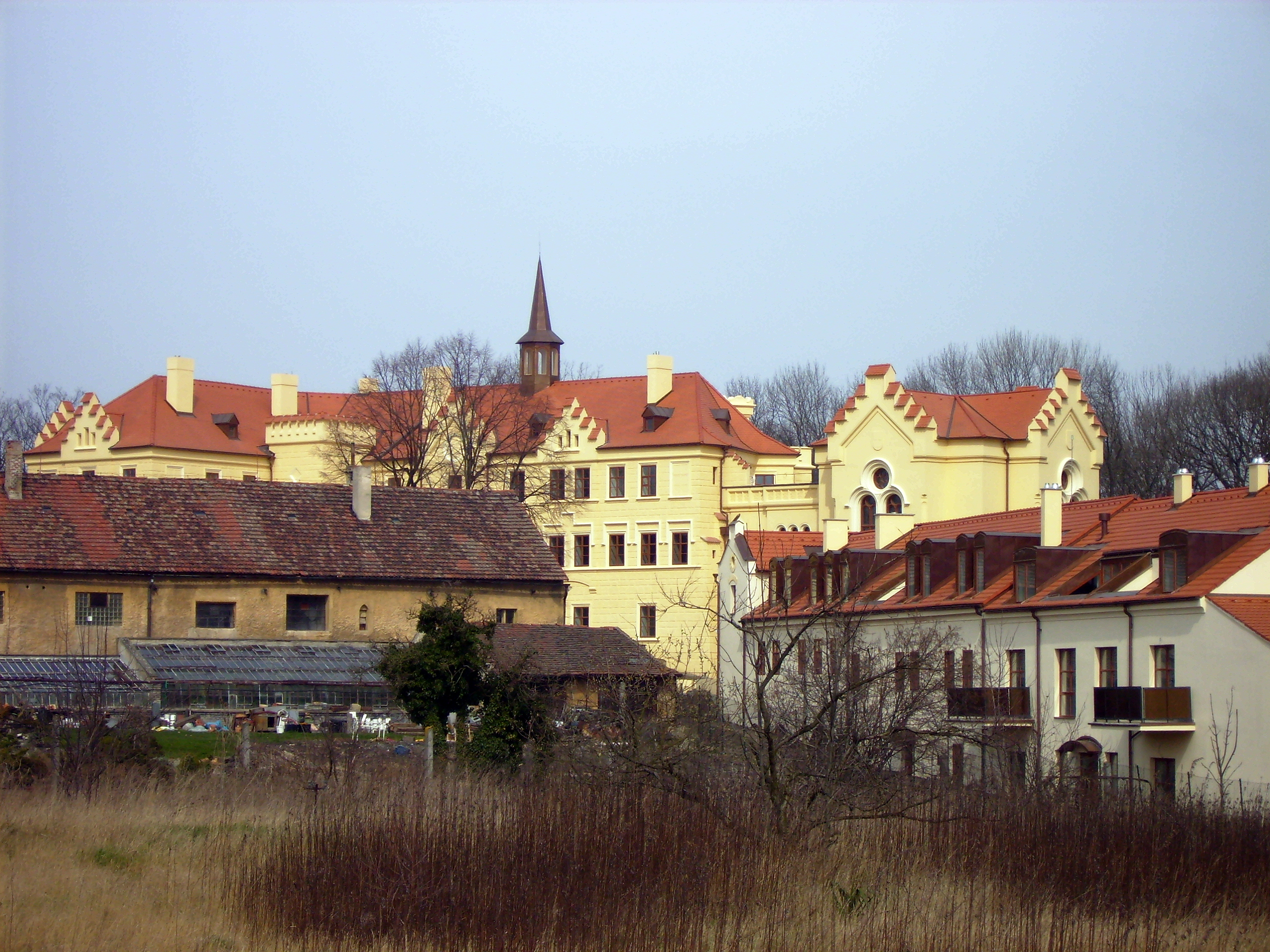
- Jirny Castle

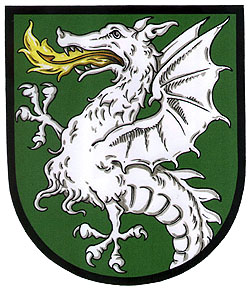
- Flag Coat of arms

- Location in the Czech Republic
- Coordinates: 50°6′57″N 14°41′57″E
- Country: Czech Republic
- Region: Central Bohemian
- District: Prague-East
- First mentioned: 1350

Area
  - Total: 8.26 km^{2} (3.19 sq mi)
- Elevation: 250 m (820 ft)

Population (2026-01-01)
  - Total: 3,280
  - Density: 397/km^{2} (1,030/sq mi)
- Time zone: UTC+1 (CET)
  - Summer (DST): UTC+2 (CEST)
- Postal code: 250 90
- Website: www.jirny.cz

Jirny (Czech pronunciation: [ˈjɪrnɪ]) is a municipality and village in Prague-East District in the Central Bohemian Region of the Czech Republic. It has about 3,300 inhabitants.

== Administrative division ==
Jirny consists of two municipal parts (in brackets population according to the 2021 census):

- Jirny (2,011)
- Nové Jirny (1,186)

== Etymology ==
The initial name of the settlement was Jireň (in old Czech also written as Jureň). The name was derived from the personal name Jiren/Juren (a variant of the name Jiří), meaning "Jiren's/Juren's". In the 15th century, the Latin name Girnie was used, and from this name the Czech name Jirny was derived.

== Geography ==
Jirny is located about 9 kilometres (6 mi) east of Prague. It lies in a flat landscape in the Central Elbe Table. The stream Jirenský potok flows through the municipality. The fishpond Návesní rybník is located in the centre of the municipality.

== History ==
The first written mention of Jirny is from 1350, when there was a stone fortress. For centuries, Jirny was mostly the property of various lesser nobles. Until the Thirty Years' War, there were two villages in the area of today's municipality: Jirny and Jiřenec. After the war, in the 17th century, the area was rebuilt as one village.

== Demographics ==
Historical population

Year	Pop.	±%
1869	1,147	—
1880	1,240	+8.1%
1890	1,167	−5.9%
1900	1,194	+2.3%
1910	1,423	+19.2%

Year	Pop.	±%
1921	1,388	−2.5%
1930	1,835	+32.2%
1950	1,781	−2.9%
1961	1,797	+0.9%
1970	1,641	−8.7%

Year	Pop.	±%
1980	1,469	−10.5%
1991	1,302	−11.4%
2001	1,331	+2.2%
2011	2,532	+90.2%
2021	3,197	+26.3%

Source: Censuses

== Transport ==
The D11 motorway from Prague to Hradec Králové runs through the municipality.

== Sights ==
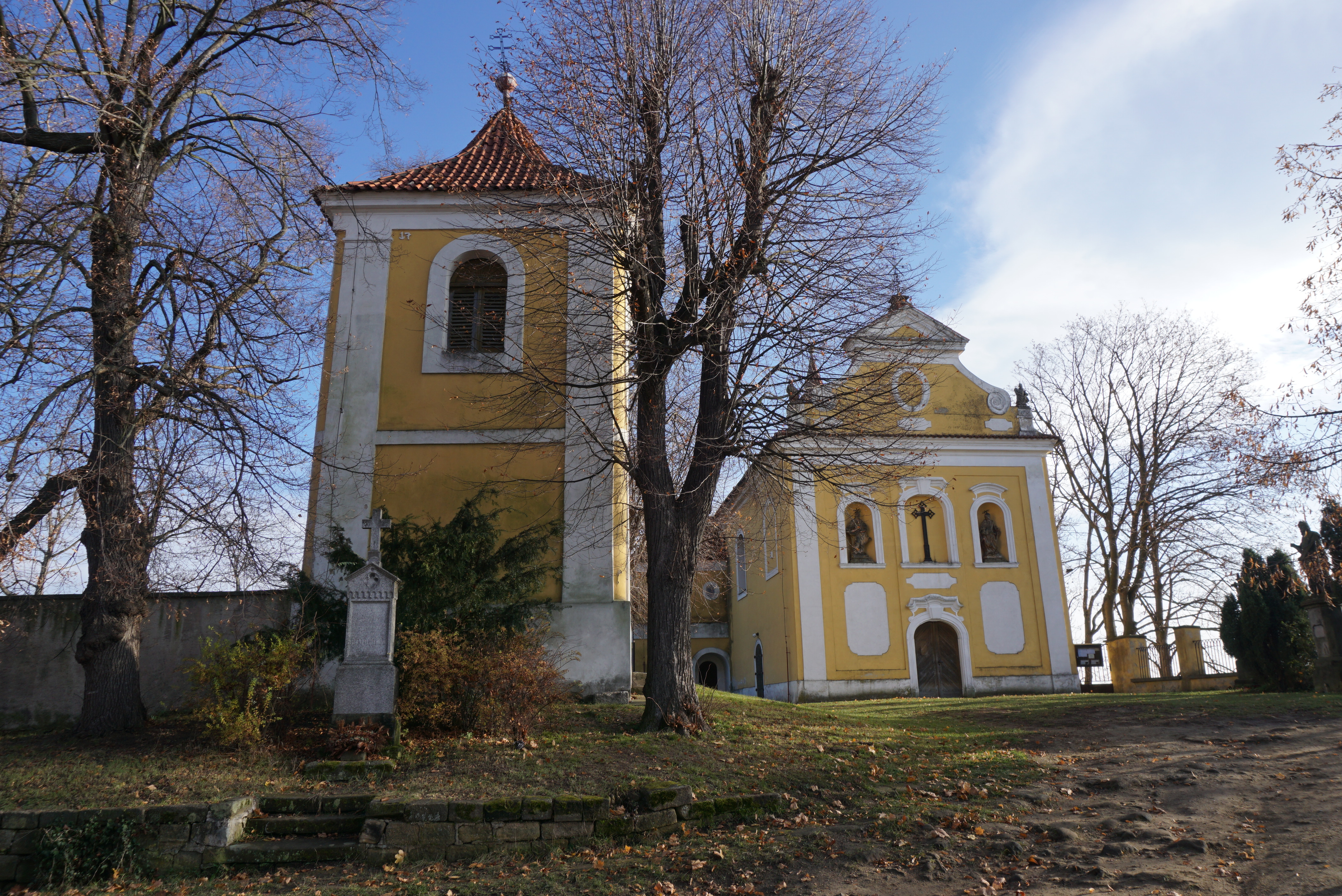
Church of Saints Peter and Paul

The main landmarks of Jirny are the Church of Saints Peter and Paul and Jirny Castle. The church was originally a Gothic building from the 14th century, rebuilt in the Baroque style in the 18th century. Next to the church is a separate bell tower.

The local medieval fortress was rebuilt into a Renaissance castle, which was rebuilt in the Baroque style in the 17th century. In 1844–1847 and 1851–1856, Romantic modifications were made. Today it is privately owned and inaccessible. The castle is surrounded by an English-style park.
