= Rokytnice (Přerov District) =

- Municipality
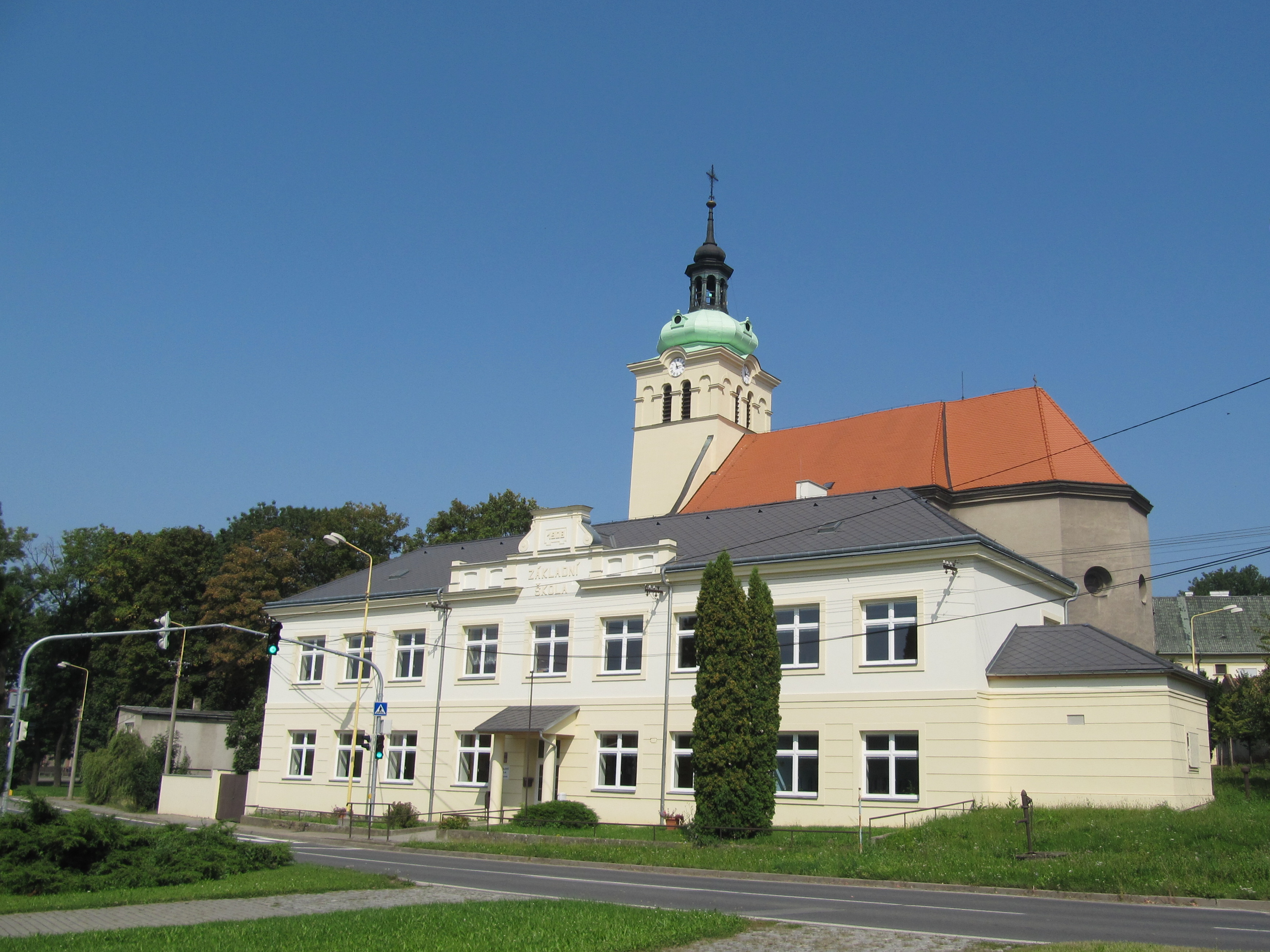
- Primary school and Church of Saint James the Great

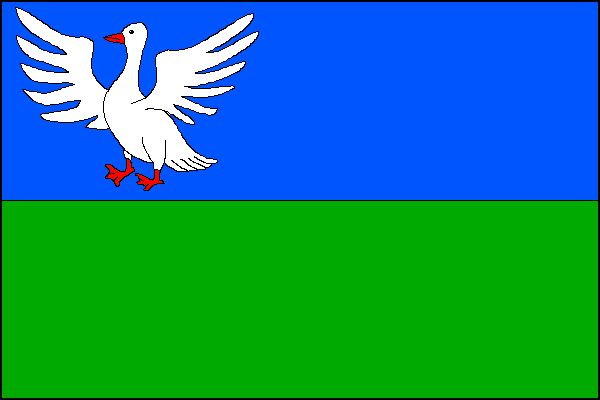
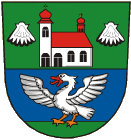
- Flag Coat of arms

- Location in the Czech Republic
- Coordinates: 49°27′57″N 17°23′28″E
- Country: Czech Republic
- Region: Olomouc
- District: Přerov
- First mentioned: 1348

Area
  - Total: 8.06 km^{2} (3.11 sq mi)
- Elevation: 210 m (690 ft)

Population (2026-01-01)
  - Total: 1,514
  - Density: 188/km^{2} (487/sq mi)
- Time zone: UTC+1 (CET)
  - Summer (DST): UTC+2 (CEST)
- Postal code: 751 04
- Website: www.obecrokytnice.cz

Rokytnice is a municipality and village in Přerov District in the Olomouc Region of the Czech Republic. It has about 1,500 inhabitants.

Rokytnice lies approximately 5 kilometres (3 mi) west of Přerov, 18 km (11 mi) south-east of Olomouc, and 224 km (139 mi) east of Prague.

== Demographics ==
Historical population
Year	Pop.	±%
1869	871	—
1880	851	−2.3%
1890	912	+7.2%
1900	941	+3.2%
1910	1,147	+21.9%
1921	1,243	+8.4%
1930	1,413	+13.7%
1950	1,475	+4.4%
1961	1,725	+16.9%
1970	1,640	−4.9%
1980	1,575	−4.0%
1991	1,390	−11.7%
2001	1,422	+2.3%
2011	1,431	+0.6%
2021	1,529	+6.8%
Source: Censuses

== Notable people ==
- Lubomír Dvořák (born 1964), physicist
