= West Fork Rio Chama =

Physical characteristics
- Source
  - location: Archuleta County, Colorado
  - coordinates: 37°07′05″N 106°36′45″W
- Mouth
  - location: Confluence with East Fork
  - coordinates: 37°05′29″N 106°33′03″W
  - elevation: 9,272 ft (2,826 m)

Basin features
- Progression: Rio Chama—Rio Grande

West Fork Rio Chama is a tributary of the Rio Chama in southern Colorado. The stream flows southeast from its source Chama Lake near the continental divide to a confluence with the East Fork Rio Chama in Archuleta County that forms the Rio Chama.

== See also ==
- List of rivers of Colorado
