= Dvorak (disambiguation) =

Antonín Dvořák (1841–1904) was a Czech composer.

Dvorak may also refer to:

- Dvořák (surname), a Czech surname, including a list of people with the name, and variants
- Dvorák (crater), on Mercury named after the composer
- Dvorak keyboard layout, an alternative to the QWERTY layout created by August Dvorak
- Dvorak technique, to estimate tropical cyclone intensity developed by Vernon Dvorak

== See also ==
- Dworshak (disambiguation)
