= Smiřice =

- Town
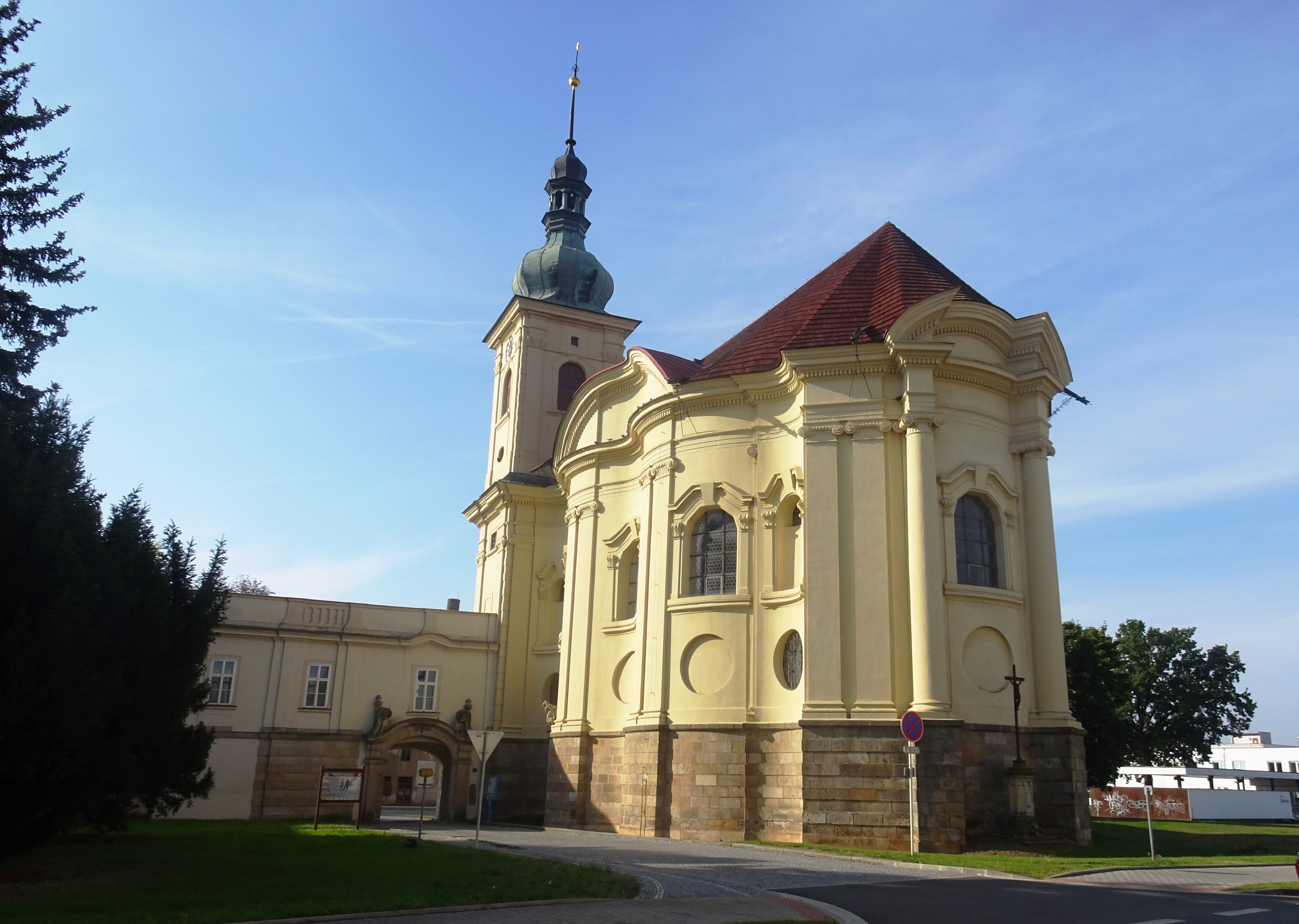
- Chapel of the Epiphany

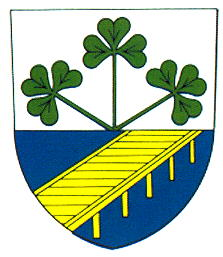
- Coat of arms

- Location in the Czech Republic
- Coordinates: 50°17′59″N 15°51′50″E
- Country: Czech Republic
- Region: Hradec Králové
- District: Hradec Králové
- First mentioned: 1361

Government
  - Mayor: Luboš Tuzar

Area
  - Total: 10.68 km^{2} (4.12 sq mi)
- Elevation: 240 m (790 ft)

Population (2026-01-01)
  - Total: 3,142
  - Density: 294.2/km^{2} (762.0/sq mi)
- Time zone: UTC+1 (CET)
  - Summer (DST): UTC+2 (CEST)
- Postal code: 503 03
- Website: www.mestosmirice.cz

Smiřice (Czech pronunciation: [ˈsmɪr̝ɪtsɛ]; German: Smirschitz) is a town in Hradec Králové District in the Hradec Králové Region of the Czech Republic. It has about 3,100 inhabitants. The town is located on the right bank of the Elbe River, in the East Elbe Table.

Smiřice became a town in 1659. The most important monument in the town is the Chapel of the Epiphany, which of protected as a national cultural monument.

== Administrative division ==
Smiřice consists of three municipal parts (in brackets population according to the 2021 census):

- Smiřice (2,590)
- Rodov (192)
- Trotina (14)

== Etymology ==
The name Smiřice is derived from the personal name Smír, meaning "the village of Smír's people".

== Geography ==
Smiřice is located about 9 kilometres (6 mi) north of Hradec Králové. It lies in an agricultural landscape in the East Elbe Table. The highest point is the flat hill Lískovec at 296 m (971 ft) above sea level. The town is situated on the right bank of the Elbe River.

== History ==
The first written mention of Smiřice is from 1361. It was originally a settlement between two branches of the Elbe with a fortress, which was later rebuilt to a castle. Smiřice was the centre of a large estate owned by various noble families, most notably by the Smiřickýs of Smiřice (until 1476), the Trčkas of Lípa (1498–1636) and the Sternbergs (1685–1780). In 1659, the village was promoted to a town.

== Demographics ==
Historical population

Year	Pop.	±%
1869	2,218	—
1880	2,788	+25.7%
1890	2,834	+1.6%
1900	2,834	+0.0%
1910	2,964	+4.6%

Year	Pop.	±%
1921	2,765	−6.7%
1930	2,961	+7.1%
1950	2,765	−6.6%
1961	2,828	+2.3%
1970	2,653	−6.2%

Year	Pop.	±%
1980	3,118	+17.5%
1991	3,084	−1.1%
2001	3,145	+2.0%
2011	2,808	−10.7%
2021	2,796	−0.4%

Source: Censuses

== Transport ==
The D11 motorway runs next to the town.

Smiřice is located on the railway line heading from Pardubice and Hradec Králové to Jaroměř.

== Sights ==
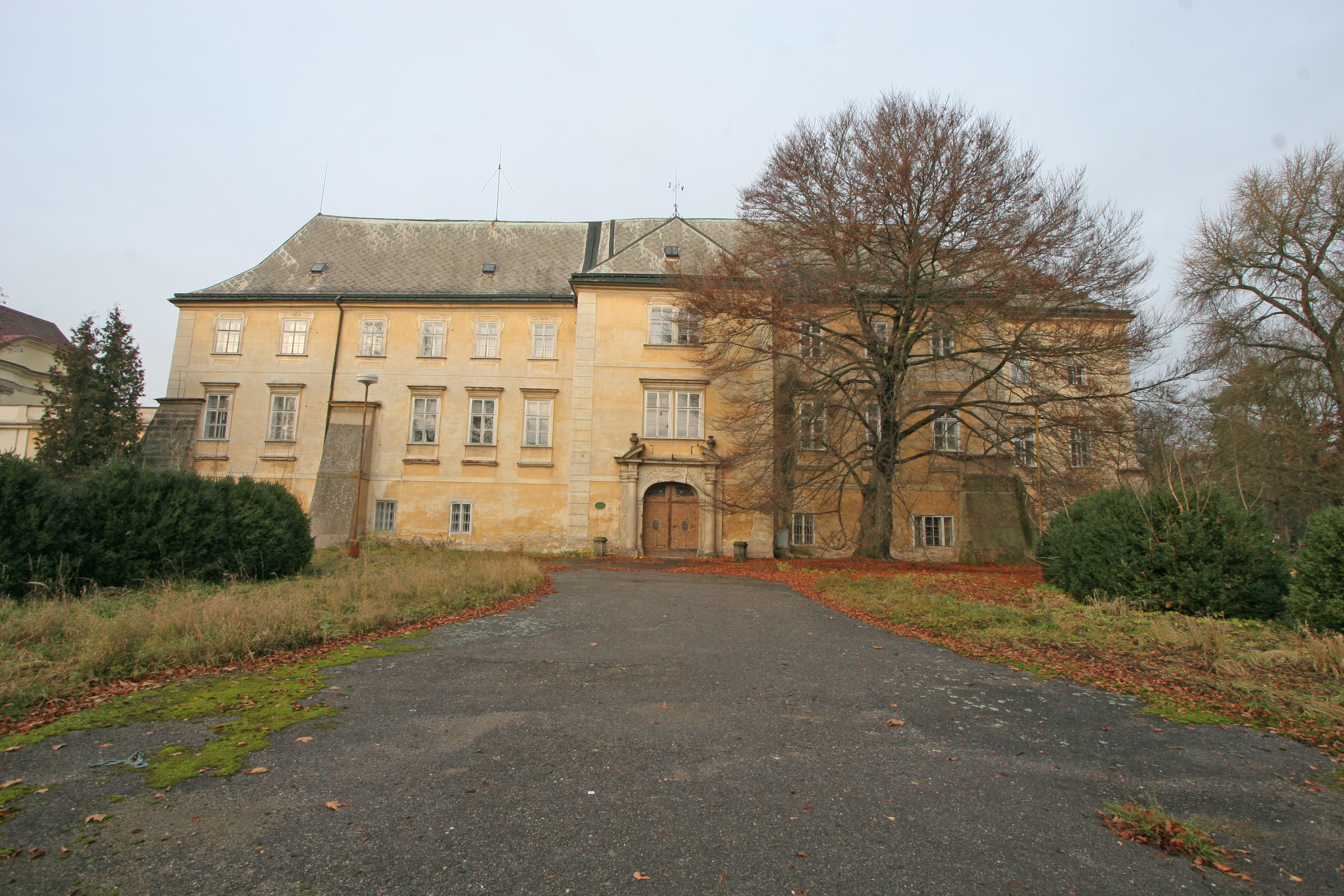
Smiřice Castle

The main landmark of the town is the Smiřice Castle. The fortress, which formerly stood on the site of the castle, was most likely rebuilt in the first third of the 17th century. Artistic modifications were made around 1700 by the Sternbergs. Today the castle is privately owned and is gradually reconstructed.

The most important monument is the Chapel of the Epiphany. This large Baroque castle chapel was probably built according to design by Christoph Dientzenhofer between 1699 and 1710. For its value, it is protected as a national cultural monument.

== Notable people ==
- Miloš Dvořák (1939–2025), actor
- Josef Hojný (born 1958), sport shooter

== Twin towns – sister cities ==
Smiřice is twinned with:

- Boguszów-Gorce, Poland
