= Bříství =

- Municipality
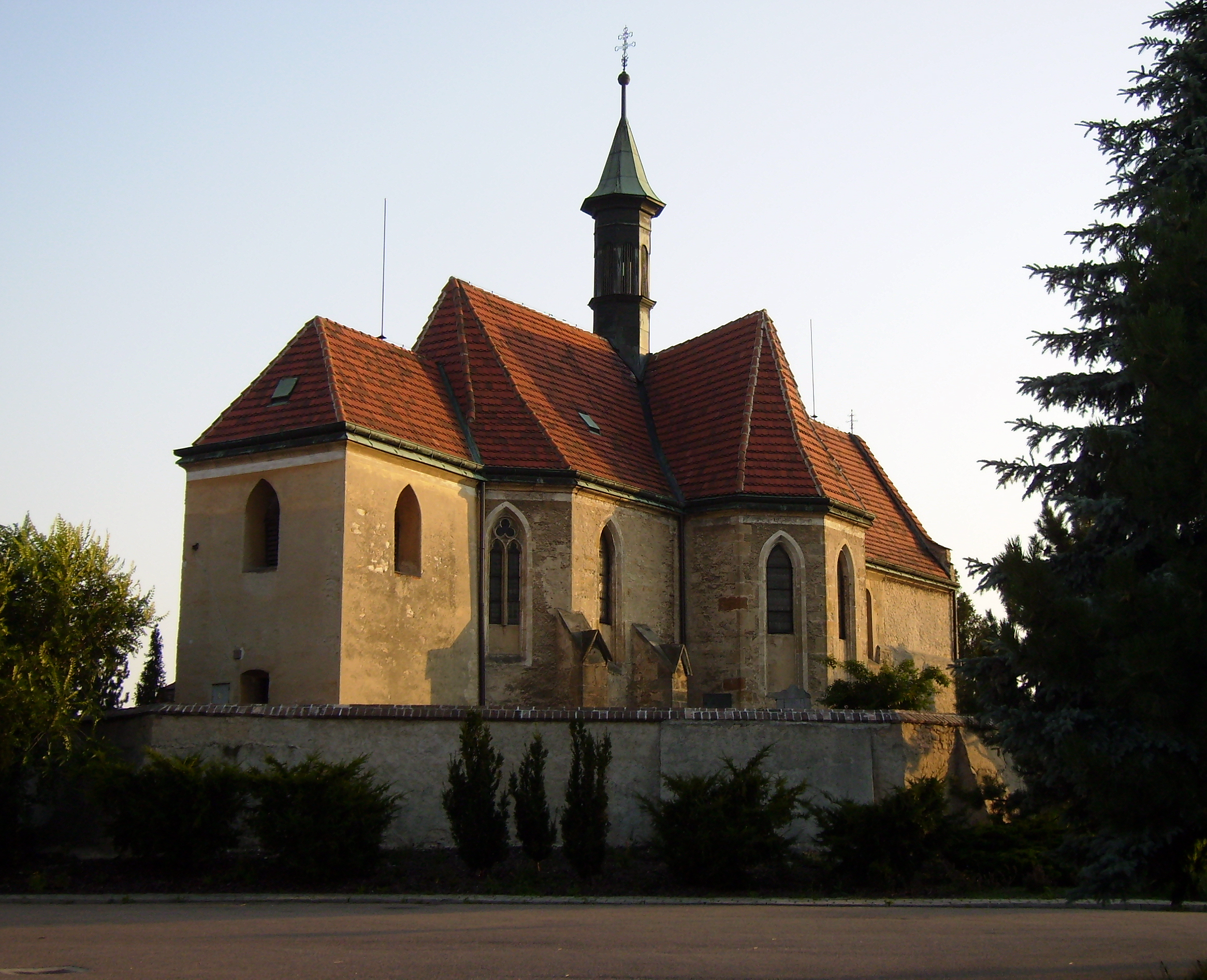
- Church of the Finding of the Holy Cross

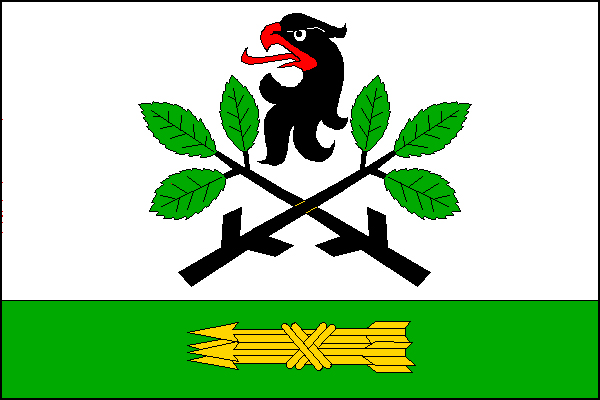
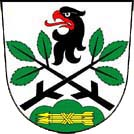
- Flag Coat of arms

- Location in the Czech Republic
- Coordinates: 50°8′2″N 14°50′31″E
- Country: Czech Republic
- Region: Central Bohemian
- District: Nymburk
- First mentioned: 1318

Area
  - Total: 3.60 km^{2} (1.39 sq mi)
- Elevation: 193 m (633 ft)

Population (2026-01-01)
  - Total: 392
  - Density: 109/km^{2} (282/sq mi)
- Time zone: UTC+1 (CET)
  - Summer (DST): UTC+2 (CEST)
- Postal code: 289 15
- Website: www.obecbristvi.cz

Bříství is a municipality and village in Nymburk District in the Central Bohemian Region of the Czech Republic. It has about 400 inhabitants.

== Etymology ==
The name evolved from the old Czech words břest (i.e. 'elm') and břístí ('elm forest').

== Geography ==
Bříství is located about 15 kilometres (9 mi) southwest of Nymburk and 21 km (13 mi) east of Prague. It lies in a flat landscape in the Central Elbe Table. The highest point is the hill Břístevská hůra at 233 m (764 ft) above sea level. The stream Kounický potok flows through the municipality.

== History ==
The first written mention of Bříství is from 1318. According to older research, the village was mentioned as early as 993 in connection with the founding of the Břevnov Monastery, but this theory is not substantiated.

== Demographics ==
Historical population

| Year | Pop. | ±% |
|---|---|---|
| 1869 | 352 | — |
| 1880 | 370 | +5.1% |
| 1890 | 406 | +9.7% |
| 1900 | 497 | +22.4% |
| 1910 | 518 | +4.2% |

| Year | Pop. | ±% |
|---|---|---|
| 1921 | 554 | +6.9% |
| 1930 | 548 | −1.1% |
| 1950 | 380 | −30.7% |
| 1961 | 374 | −1.6% |
| 1970 | 353 | −5.6% |

| Year | Pop. | ±% |
|---|---|---|
| 1980 | 302 | −14.4% |
| 1991 | 269 | −10.9% |
| 2001 | 273 | +1.5% |
| 2011 | 379 | +38.8% |
| 2021 | 373 | −1.6% |

Source: Censuses

== Transport ==
The D11 motorway (part of the European route E67) from Prague to Hradec Králové runs through the municipality.

== Sights ==
The main landmark of Bříství is the Church of the Finding of the Holy Cross. It is a Gothic church with a Romanesque core, which was probably founded around 1150.

On Břístevská hůra is a ruin of the Chapel of the Exaltation of the Holy Cross. It was built in the Baroque style in 1714. In 1764, it burned down after being struck by lightning. It was repaired in 1816, but burned down again two years later.
