= East Fork Rio Chama =

Physical characteristics
- Source
  - location: Conejos County, Colorado
  - coordinates: 37°07′53″N 106°33′03″W
- Mouth
  - location: Confluence with West Fork
  - coordinates: 37°05′29″N 106°33′03″W
  - elevation: 9,272 ft (2,826 m)

Basin features
- Progression: Rio Chama—Rio Grande

East Fork Rio Chama is a tributary of the Rio Chama in southern Colorado. The stream flows south from Dipping Lakes near the continental divide in Conejos County, Colorado to a confluence with the West Fork Rio Chama in Archuleta County, Colorado that forms the Rio Chama.

== See also ==
- List of rivers of Colorado
