= Voleč =

- Municipality
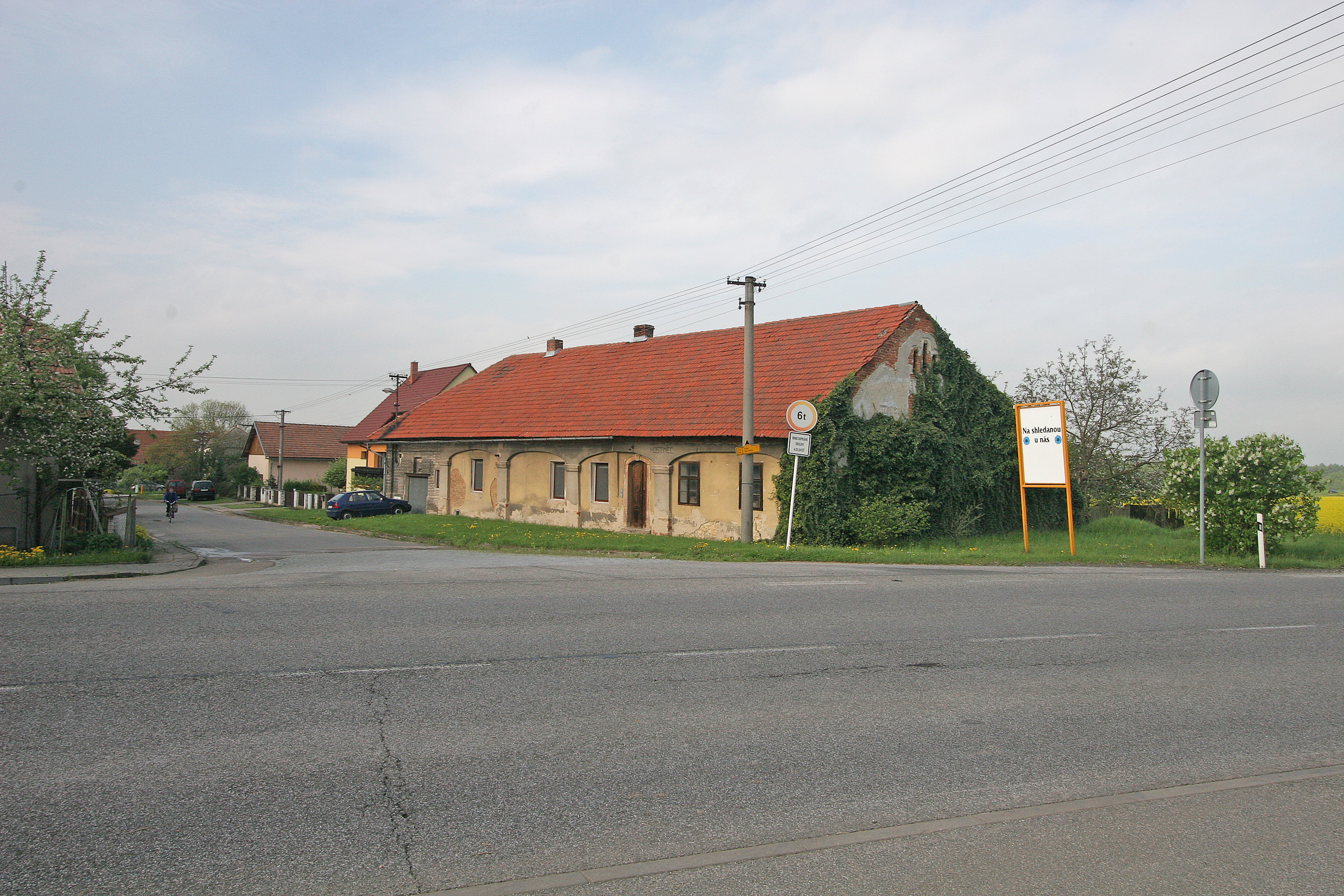
- Centre of Voleč

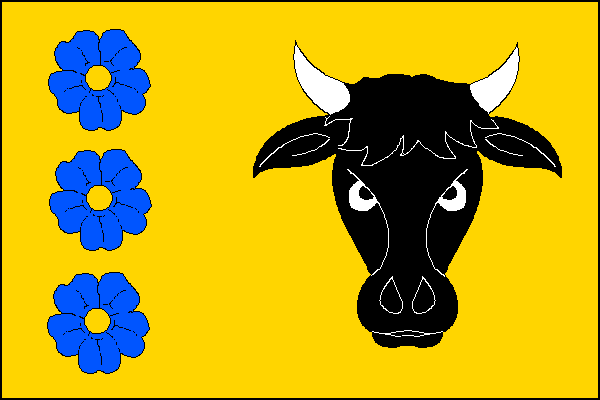
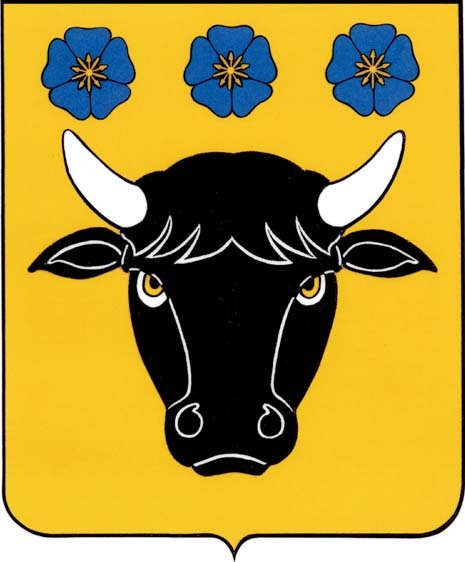
- Flag Coat of arms

- Location in the Czech Republic
- Coordinates: 50°7′3″N 15°34′22″E
- Country: Czech Republic
- Region: Pardubice
- District: Pardubice
- First mentioned: 1398

Area
  - Total: 4.78 km^{2} (1.85 sq mi)
- Elevation: 268 m (879 ft)

Population (2026-01-01)
  - Total: 387
  - Density: 81.0/km^{2} (210/sq mi)
- Time zone: UTC+1 (CET)
  - Summer (DST): UTC+2 (CEST)
- Postal code: 533 41
- Website: www.obecvolec.cz

Voleč is a municipality and village in Pardubice District in the Pardubice Region of the Czech Republic. It has about 400 inhabitants.

== Demographics ==
Historical population
Year	Pop.	±%
1869	441	—
1880	488	+10.7%
1890	495	+1.4%
1900	478	−3.4%
1910	484	+1.3%
1921	456	−5.8%
1930	425	−6.8%
1950	379	−10.8%
1961	360	−5.0%
1970	361	+0.3%
1980	373	+3.3%
1991	337	−9.7%
2001	309	−8.3%
2011	343	+11.0%
2021	367	+7.0%
Source: Censuses
