= Lukáš Dvořák (footballer) =

Czech footballer (born 1984)

Personal information
- Date of birth: 30 January 1984 (age 42)
- Place of birth: Czechoslovakia
- Height: 1.84 m (6 ft 0 in)
- Position: Defender

Team information
- Current team: Ústí nad Labem
- Number: 15

Senior career*
Years	Team	Apps	(Gls)
2004–2005	Teplice	0	(0)
2005–	Ústí nad Labem	86	(2)
- * Club domestic league appearances and goals as of 31 December 2012

Lukáš Dvořák (born 30 January 1984) is a Czech football player who currently plays for Ústí nad Labem.
