= Miloš Dvořák =

Czech actor (1939–2025)

Miloš Dvořák (29 January 1939 – 4 August 2025) was a Czech actor.

== Life and career ==
Dvořák was born in Smiřice on 29 January 1939.

In 1958, together with Pavel Fiala, he founded the amateur ensemble Kladivadlo in Broumov, which gained recognition at national theatre festivals. The group relocated to Ústí nad Labem in 1965 and later evolved into the professional Činoherní studio.

In 1990, he moved to Prague, served as secretary of the ensemble at the theatre of Realistické divadlo, and later worked at the National Theatre in Prague.

Dvořák died on 4 August 2025, at the age of 86.
