= Ladislav Dvořáček =

Czech philatelist

Ladislav Dvořáček (27 June 1923 - January 2015) was a Czech philatelist who was appointed to the Roll of Distinguished Philatelists in 2000. He was a fellow of the Royal Philatelic Society London, president of the Union of Czechoslovak Philatelists, and president of the International Federation of Philately.
