= Vard Johnson =

American politician

Member of the Nebraska Legislature from the 8th district
- In office January 3, 1979 – January 3, 1989
- Preceded by: Edwin Dvorak
- Succeeded by: Sharon Beck

Personal details
- Born: March 11, 1939 (age 87) Kansas City, Missouri
- Party: Republican (until 1983); Democratic (1983–present)
- Spouse: Loretta Turner (m. 1963)
- Children: 2 (Samuel, Schuyler)
- Education: Yale University (B.A.); Harvard Law School (LL.B.)
- Occupation: Attorney

Vard Johnson (born March 11, 1939) is a Democratic politician and attorney from Nebraska who served as a member of the Nebraska Legislature from the 8th district from 1979 to 1989.

== Early life ==
Johnson was born in Kansas City, Missouri, and graduated from Kramer High School in 1956. He later attended Yale University, and graduated with his bachelor's degree in 1960, and Harvard Law School, receiving his bachelor of laws in 1964. Upon graduation, he worked for the Omaha-based firm of Young, Holm, McEachen & Hamann, and then moved to Arizona to work for a legal aid society. He returned to Omaha in 1969 to become the director of the metropolitan area's Legal Aid Society. In 1977, Johnson took a leave of absence to teach at the Creighton University School of Law, and returned to the Legal Aid Society later that year.

== Nebraska Legislature ==
In 1978, Johnson announced that he would run for the Nebraska Legislature from the 8th district, challenging appointed State Senator Edwin Dvorak. In the nonpartisan primary, Dvorak narrowly placed first, winning 30 percent of the vote to Johnson's 27 percent and state labor department employee Francis Woznicki's 21 percent. Johnson defeated Dvorak in the general election, winning 56–44 percent.

Johnson ran for re-election in 1982, and was challenged by coin dealer Wayne Hohndorf and attorney Rosemarie Lee. In the primary election, Johnson placed first by a wide margin, winning 59 percent of the vote to Hohndorf's 26 percent and Lee's 15 percent. Johnson and Hohndorf advanced to the general election, where Johnson defeated him in a landslide, winning 63 percent of the vote to Hohndorf's 37 percent.

During Johnson's re-election campaign, he announced that he was leaving the Legal Aid Society and starting a private law firm with Robert Broom, Johnson's successor as director.

In 1983, Johnson announced that he would switch to the Democratic Party, stating that his "more moderate views [were] out of step with those of Nebraska Republican leadership."

Johnson ran for re-election in 1986, and was challenged by teacher and conservative activist Sharon Beck, attorney Horace Reynolds IV and railroad administrator George Davis. In the primary election, Johnson placed first, winning 40 percent of the vote to Beck's 39 percent. They advanced to the general election, Johnson narrowly won, winning 52 percent of the vote to her 48 percent.

In 1988, Johnson announced that he would resign from the legislature two years into his term. Though he was speculated to be considering a run for Mayor of Omaha in 1989, he ultimately declined to do so, announcing that he would return to the "highest calling in American life, that of a private citizen." He officially resigned from the legislature on January 3, 1989, and Beck was appointed by Governor Kay A. Orr to succeed him.
