= Veronika Dvořáková =

Czech handball player

Personal information
- Nationality: Czech
- Born: 7 December 2000 (age 25) Cheb, Czech Republic
- Height: 1.73 m (5 ft 8 in)

Sport
- Sport: Handball
- Position: Line player
- Current club: DHK Baník Most
- Number: 7

Senior clubs
- Years: Team
- 2017–: DHK Baník Most
National team
- Years: Team
- 2018–: Czech Republic

Veronika Dvořáková (born 7 December 2000) is a Czech handball player who plays for DHK Baník Most and the Czech Republic national team.

== Achievements ==
- Czech First Division:
  - Winner: 2018
