= Edwin Dvorak =

American politician (1929–2004)

Member of the Nebraska Legislature from the 8th district
- In office August 4, 1977 – January 4, 1979
- Preceded by: Warren Swigart
- Succeeded by: Vard Johnson

Personal details
- Born: December 14, 1929 near Ravinia, South Dakota
- Died: December 10, 2004 (aged 74) Omaha, Nebraska
- Party: Democratic
- Education: Creighton University (B.B.A.)
- Occupation: Accountant

Military service
- Allegiance: United States
- Branch/service: United States Marine Corps
- Years of service: 1952–1954

Edwin V. Dvorak (December 14, 1929 – December 10, 2004) was a Democratic politician from Nebraska who served as a member of the Nebraska Legislature from the 8th district from 1977 to 1979.

== Early life ==
Dvorak was born on his family's farm near Ravinia, South Dakota, in 1929, He grew up in Lake Andes, South Dakota, and played as a halfback in high school. Dvorak moved to Omaha, Nebraska, in 1947, to attend Creighton University, where he received his bachelor's degree in business administration. He served in the Marines from 1952 to 1954, and returned to Omaha, working as a sales representative, accountant, and life insurance agent before establishing an accounting firm.

== Nebraska Legislature ==
In 1977, State Senator Warren Swigart, who represented the North Omaha-based 8th district, resigned after he was elected to the Omaha City Council. Governor J. James Exon appointed Dvorak to serve out the remainder of Swigart's term, and upon Dvorak's swearing in on August 4, 1977, he announced that he would seek a full term in 1978. Dvorak, a sportsman, pushed for the creation of new state parks in the legislature.

Dvorak faced five challengers in the nonpartisan primary: attorney Vard Johnson, University of Nebraska at Omaha administrator Earl Berg, state labor department employee Frances Woznicki, retired teacher Christine Kneifl, and businessman Grant Manchester. Dvorak placed first in the primary election, receiving 30 percent of the vote, and advanced to the general election against Johnson, who placed second with 27 percent. Johnson ultimately defeated Dvorak, winning the general election with 56 percent of the vote.

== Death ==
Dvorak died on December 10, 2004.
