= Tzii-wi =

Type of axe

The Tzii-wi (two flake or two point) is a type of axe historically used in the Jemez Plateau, New Mexico, USA. Notched and double-bitted, it is believed to be associated with war.
