= Lubomír Dvořák =

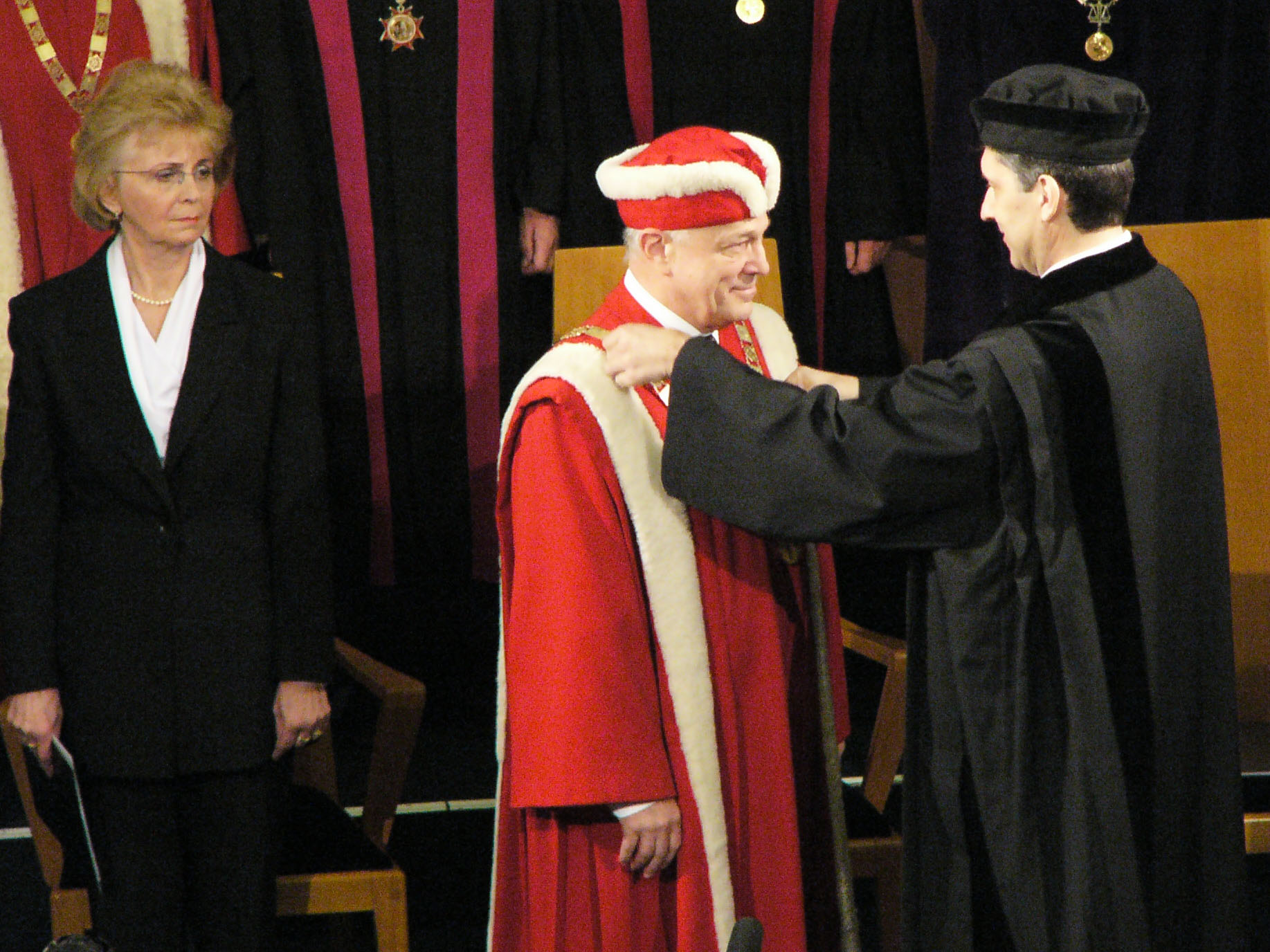
Inauguration of Lubomír Dvořák in 2006 as Palacký University Rector at Olomouc

Lubomír Dvořák (born 10 July 1940 in Rokytnice) is a Czech scientist specialising in experimental physics.

From 1997 to 2000 and again between 2006 and 2010 he was Rector of the Palacký University of Olomouc.

Between 1993 and 1997 and again from 2003 till 2006 he served as the Dean of the Faculty of Science at Olomouc. Since 2010 he has been University Vice-Rector for Regional Development, one of seven vice-rectors currently at Olomouc.
