= Filip Dvořák (ice hockey, born 1976) =

Czech ice hockey player

- Born: December 2, 1976 (age 48) Czechoslovakia
- Height: 6 ft 0 in (183 cm)
- Weight: 174 lb (79 kg; 12 st 6 lb)
- Position: Forward
- Shot: Left
- Played for: HC Olomouc
- Playing career: 1995–2007

Filip Dvořák (born December 2, 1976) is a Czech former professional ice hockey player who played 26 games in the Czech Extraliga over two seasons.

Dvořák made his Czech Extraliga debut playing with HC Olomouc during the 1995-96 Czech Extraliga season.
