= Lukáš Dvořák (photographer) =

Czech photographer

- Born: 1982 (age 43–44); Prague, Czechoslovakia
- Known for: Photography
- Website: lukasdvorak.net

Lukáš Dvořák (born 1982) is a Czech photographer.

== Career ==
His artwork has been published by a number of fashion magazines, including Vogue, Harper's Bazaar, Marie Claire, Vanity Fair, Cosmopolitan, as well men's magazines, Playboy and GQ. He has a strong preference for black and white photography in his work, which is highly contrasting and striking. His images are characterized by an intense emotional and sensually erotic charge. He is inspired by travelling the world in search of places with the most beautiful light. Location and light are as important to him as the charismatic and feminine types of models he photographs.

== Bibliography ==
- 2010: First Impression (164 p., self-published)

== Exhibitions ==
- 2004: Lukáš Dvořák – Galerie Nora, Prague, Czech Republic
- 2005: New Zealand – Café-Bar-Galerie Hidden, Prague, Czech Republic
- 2005: Lukáš Dvořák – Palackého náměstí, Prague, Czech Republic
- 2005: New Zealand – Kulturní centrum Novodvorská, Prague, Czech Republic
- 2009: Lukáš Dvořák – Kongresové Centrum, Prague, Czech Republic
- 2010: First Impression, Leica Gallery Prague, Prague, Czech Republic
- 2010: Festival Internationale de la photographie de mode, Cannes, France
- 2011: Lukáš Dvořák, Prague Photo Festival, Prague, Czech Republic
- 2012: Festival International de la photographie de mode, Cannes, France
- 2013: Lukáš Dvořák, Embassy of the Czech Republic, Accra, Ghana
- 2013: Nudes, Galerie Vinicni Altan, Prague, Czech Republic
- 2017: Nudes, Galerie Vnitroblok, Prague, Czech Republic
- 2021: Jizerská 50 viděna šesti, Leica Gallery Prague, Prague, Czech Republic
