= Sapawe, New Mexico =

Tewa Pueblo ancestral site

Sapawe or Sepawe (Tewa: Są̈p’ą̈́ą̈we Ówîngeh Kayyee) is a Tewa Pueblo ancestral site in an address-restricted area near El Rito, New Mexico. It was occupied from around 1350 until around 1550.

Coordinates: 36°18′01″N 106°09′28″W
