= Rio Chama =

River of Colorado and New Mexico in the US

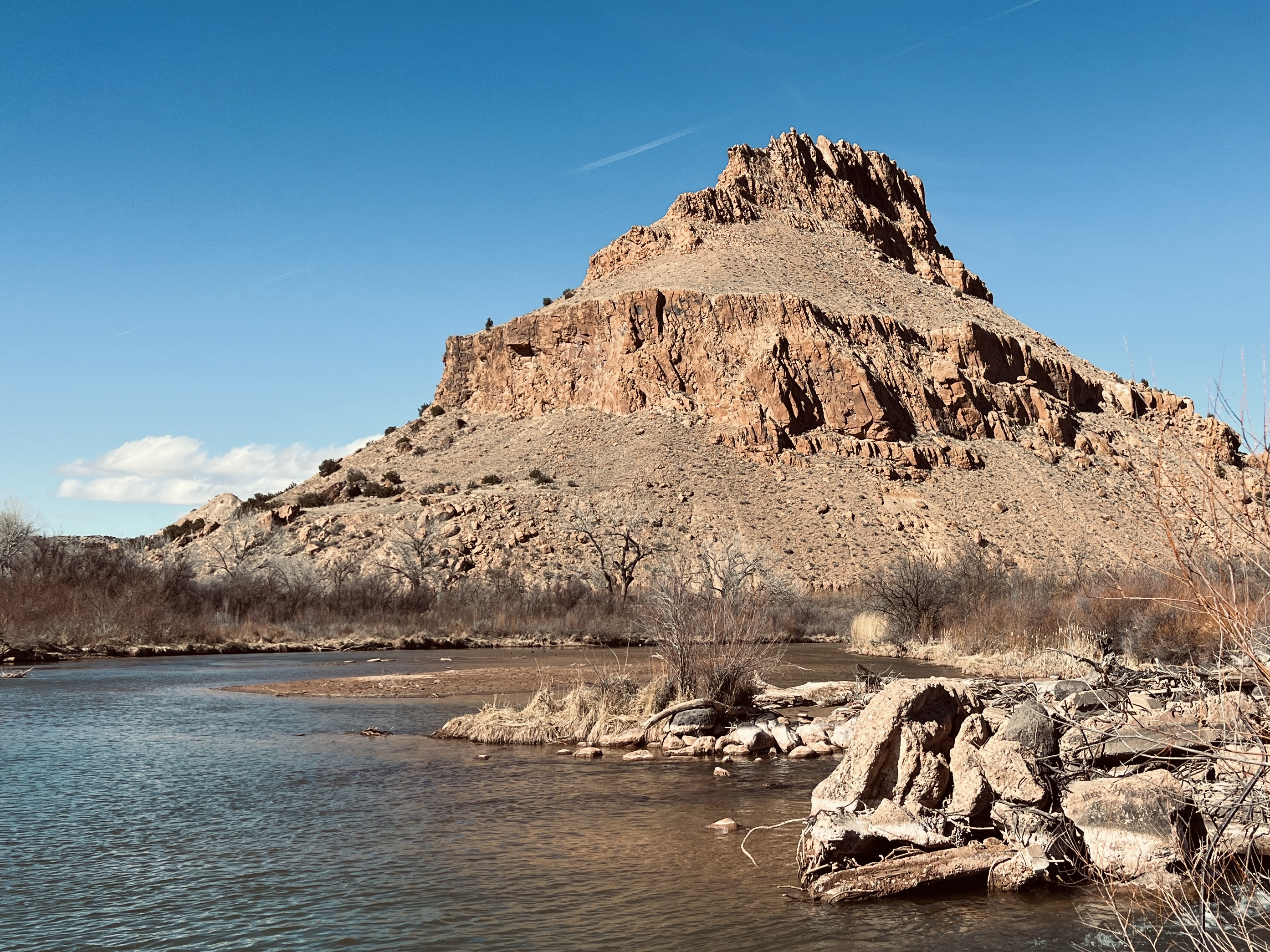
- The Rio Chama near Abiquiú, New Mexico

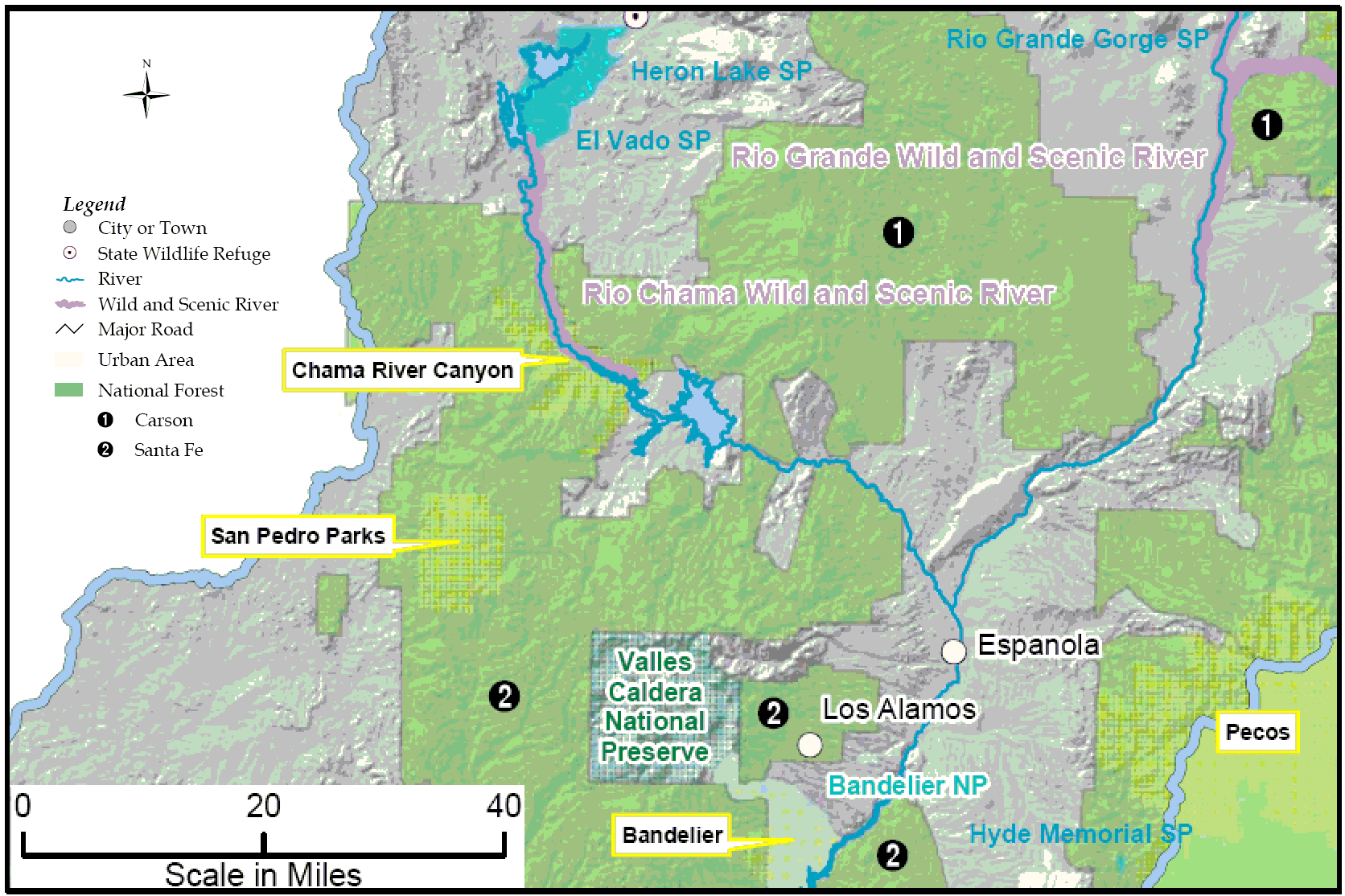
- Map of the Rio Chama within New Mexico, showing reservoirs and "wild and scenic" stretch

Location
- Country: United States
- State: New Mexico, Colorado
- Counties: Rio Arriba County, New Mexico, Archuleta County, Colorado, Conejos County, Colorado

Physical characteristics
- Source: Confluence of West Fork and East Fork
  - location: San Juan Mountains, Rio Grande National Forest, Colorado
  - coordinates: 37°05′36″N 106°33′06″W
  - elevation: 9,440 ft (2,880 m)
- Mouth: Rio Grande
  - location: Ohkay Owingeh, New Mexico
  - coordinates: 36°2′32″N 106°5′16″W
  - elevation: 5,620 ft (1,710 m)
- Length: 130 mi (210 km)
- Basin size: 3,144 sq mi (8,140 km^{2})
- Discharge
  - location: USGS gage 08290000, 2.8 miles above mouth
  - average: 571 cu ft/s (16.2 m^{3}/s)
  - minimum: 1.2 cu ft/s (0.034 m^{3}/s)
  - maximum: 15,000 cu ft/s (420 m^{3}/s)

National Wild and Scenic River
- Type: Wild, Scenic
- Designated: November 7, 1988

The Rio Chama, a major tributary river of the Rio Grande, is located in the U.S. states of Colorado and New Mexico. The river is about 130 miles (210 km) long altogether. From its source to El Vado Dam its length is about 50 miles (80 km), from El Vado Dam to Abiquiu Dam is about 51 miles (82 km), and from Abiquiu Dam to its confluence with the Rio Grande is about 34 miles (55 km).

The name "Chama" is a Spanish approximation of the Tewa term Tsâmâ ("they wrestled"), which is taken from the nearby now-abandoned Tsama Pueblo, which may still have been occupied during the Spanish exploration, about 5.5 miles (9 km) east of Abiquiu, New Mexico. The Tewa, who live along the river, call it P'oe P'în P'oe or 'red river water'.

== Course ==
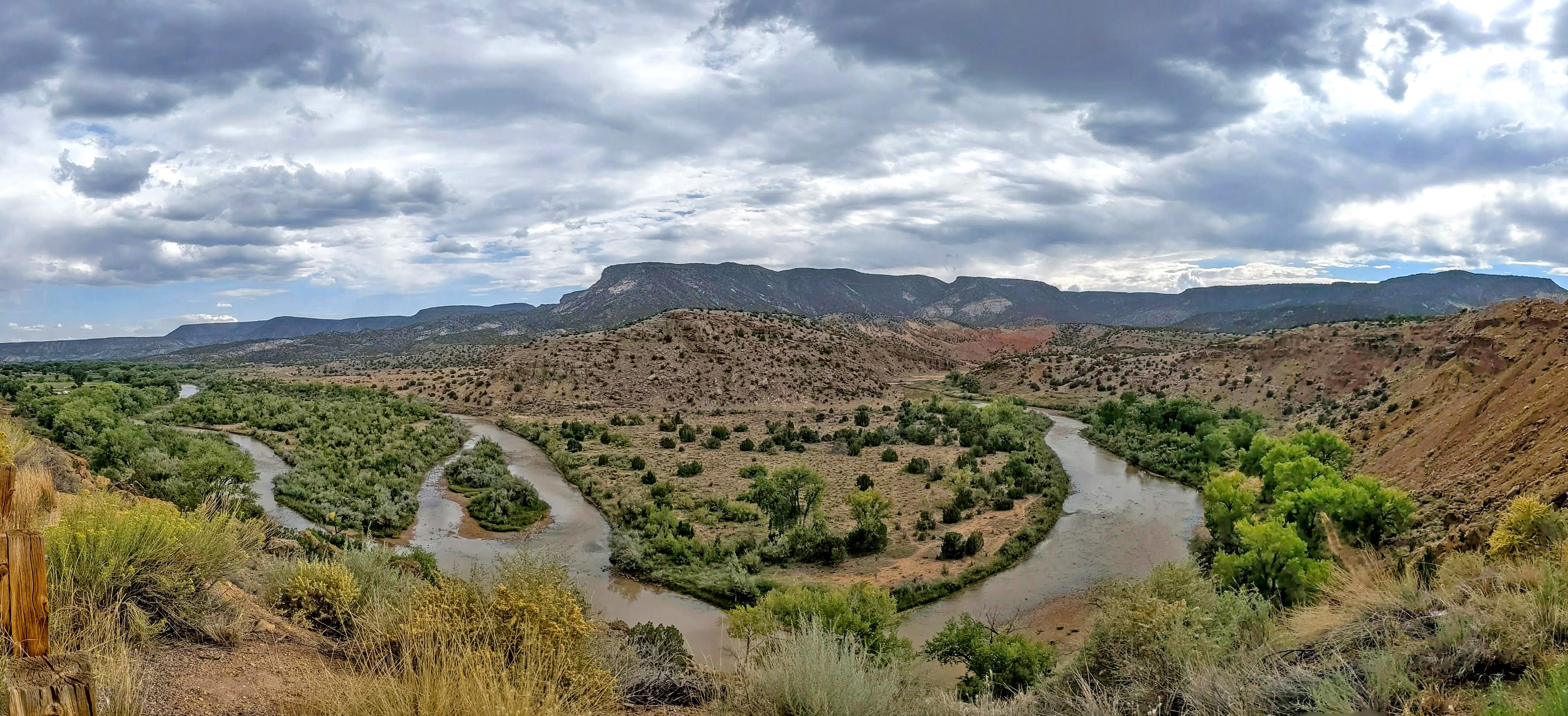
The Rio Chama viewed from US highway 84 between Abiquiú, New Mexico, and Abiquiu Dam

The Rio Chama originates in south-central Colorado, just above the New Mexico border in the San Juan Mountains and Rio Grande National Forest. The main stem Rio Chama begins at the confluence of two short headwater tributaries called West Fork and East Fork. The West Fork flows eastward from the Continental Divide. Across the divide lies the Navajo River, one of the headwater tributaries of the Colorado River. The East Fork extends a few miles into Conejos County, Colorado to a source near one of the headwater tributaries of the Conejos River. The confluence of the forks lies just within Archuleta County, Colorado. From there the Rio Chama flows generally south. After a few miles the river enters Rio Arriba County, New Mexico, and flows by the town of Chama. The tributary Willow Creek joins the Rio Chama after being impounded as Heron Lake by Heron Dam. Willow Creek flows from the dam about 1,000 feet (300 m) to the Rio Chama. A couple miles below that the Rio Chama flows into El Vado Lake, a reservoir created by El Vado Dam.

From El Vado Dam the Rio Chama continues flowing south, entering Chama Canyon and Santa Fe National Forest and the Chama River Canyon Wilderness. It is joined by Rio Cebolla from the east, then Rio Gallina from the west. Then the river enters Abiquiu Lake, the reservoir created by Abiquiu Dam. The tributary Rio Puerco joins the Rio Chama in Abiquiu Lake.

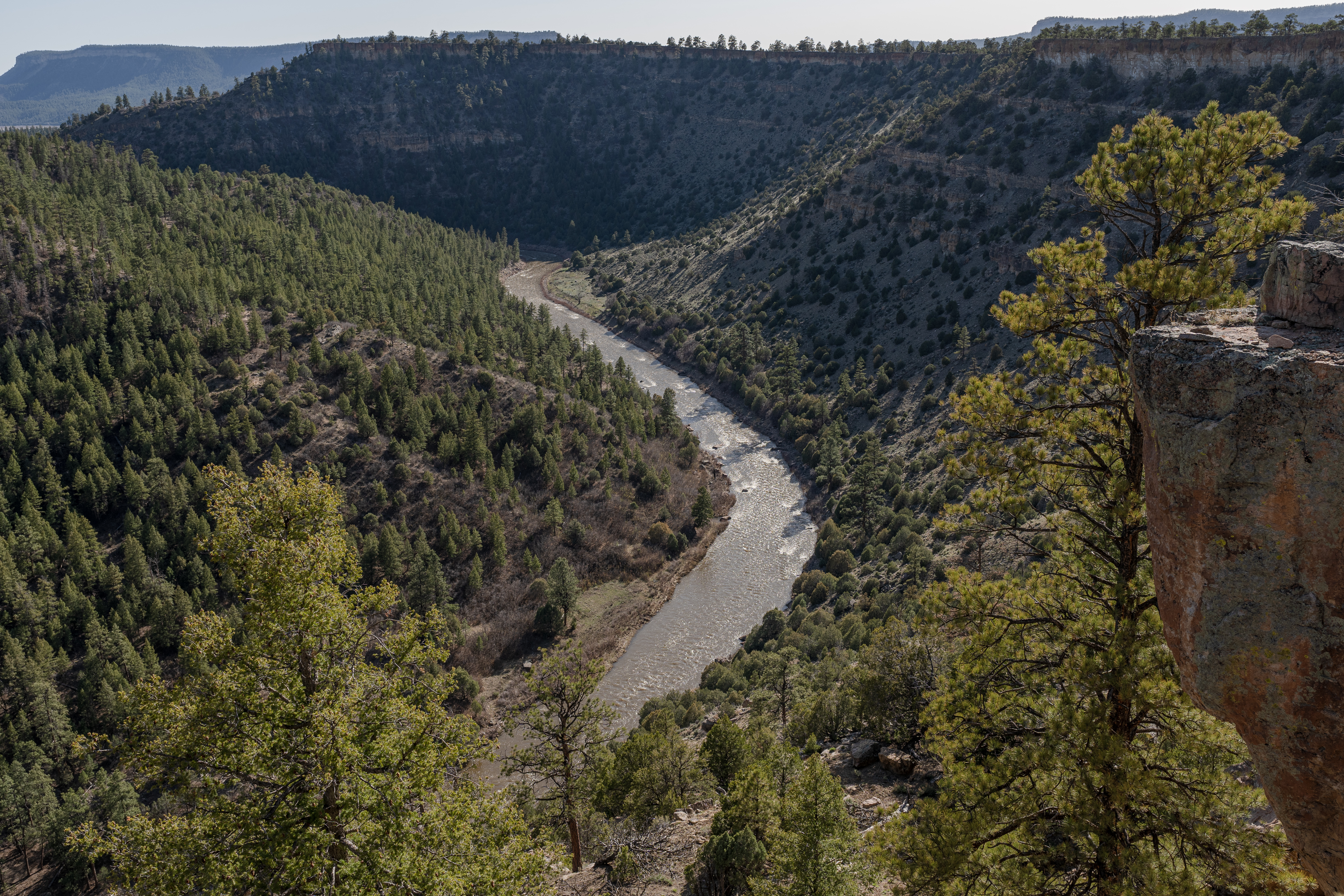
Rio Chama passes through the canyon on the southern end of Heron Lake State Park.

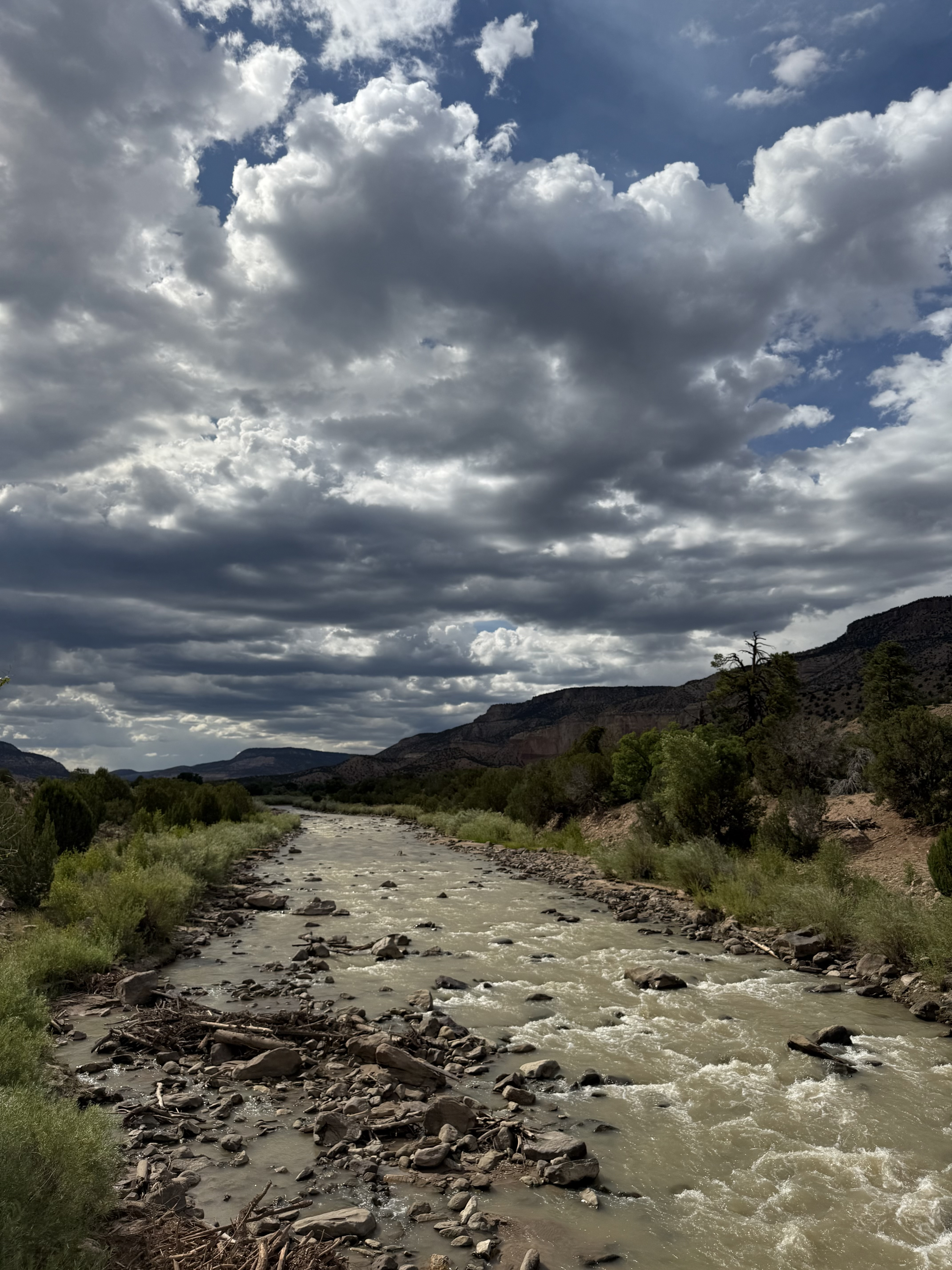
Looking upstream from the CDT crossing.

Below Abiquiu Dam the Rio Chama flows generally east, skirting the edge of Carson National Forest. It flows by the town of Abiquiú, located at the mouth of Abiquiu Creek, after which it turns to flow generally southeast. Near the villages of Chili and La Chuachia the Rio Chama is joined by two of its primary tributaries. The Rio del Oso joins from the west then, within less than a mile, the Rio Ojo Caliente joins from the northeast. From there the Rio Chama flows several miles southeast to join the Rio Grande near Ohkay Owingeh, about 5 miles (8.0 km) north of the city of Española and approximately 30 miles (48 km) north of Santa Fe.

== History ==
The Rio Chama has been used by humans for nearly 10,000 years, dating from the time when camels and Columbian mammoths roamed the southwestern United States. In 1988, the 24.6-mile (39.6 km) section known as Chama Canyon was designated as a National Wild and Scenic River by the U.S. Congress.

== Recreation ==
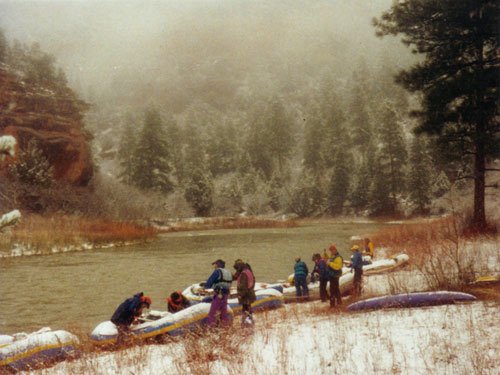
An early spring rafting trip down the Rio Chama in New Mexico

=== Whitewater boating ===
The upper river is characterized by huge boulders that create difficult holes, sizeable drops and hidden/sunken driftwood that test experienced whitewater boaters. The first 6-7.5 miles (12.1 km) of this reach above El Vado Lake in New Mexico is a Class IV to VI whitewater run of great intensity that is only suitable for expert whitewater kayakers. The rest of this run can be made by canoeists and kayakers with at least strong intermediate level whitewater skills on Class I to III water that drops through deep canyons on its way to the lake. Below El Vado Lake the river is a Class II to III run for almost anybody with intermediate or higher level whitewater skills. After passing through Abiquiu Lake, the river passes through private land, however, the constitution of New Mexico provides for public access to the waterway as long as individuals remain within the banks of the river.

The popular section for most paddlers is the 31.1 miles (50.1 km) from El Vado Ranch down through Chama Canyon and Chavez Canyon to the Big Eddy access above Abiquiu Reservoir near US 84.

=== Fishing ===
The Rio Chama and its tributaries offer excellent fly fishing for trout. Ten miles of the Rio Chama, above the mouth of Wolf Creek (4 miles (6.4 km) below the New Mexico border), public waterway easement runs through private land, restricting access to streambeds-only on the Rio Chama and Wolf Creek. The Rio Chama at this point holds wild browns with cutthroats in Wolf Creek and rainbows in both streams. The Rio Chamita flows into the Rio Chama, 9 miles (14 km) below the Wolf Creek confluence with the Rio Chama. Access to the Rio Chamita is from a dirt road one and a half miles north of the town of Chama.

North of Chama on NM 17 there is good trout fly fishing. There are special regulations on this stretch of the Rio Chama. Fifteen miles south of Chama on US 64/84 is the confluence of the Rio Brazos with the Rio Chama. Most of this run of the Rio Chama is on private land, except for a 4-mile (6.4 km)-long stretch south of Chama.

Below its confluence with the Rio Brazos, the Rio Chama offers several miles of fly fishing to the tailwaters of Heron Lake and El Vado Reservoir. The Rio Chama, is very wide at this point, with large runs, pools, and boulders that create fishing opportunities for rainbow and wild brown trout.

== Chama Canyon ==
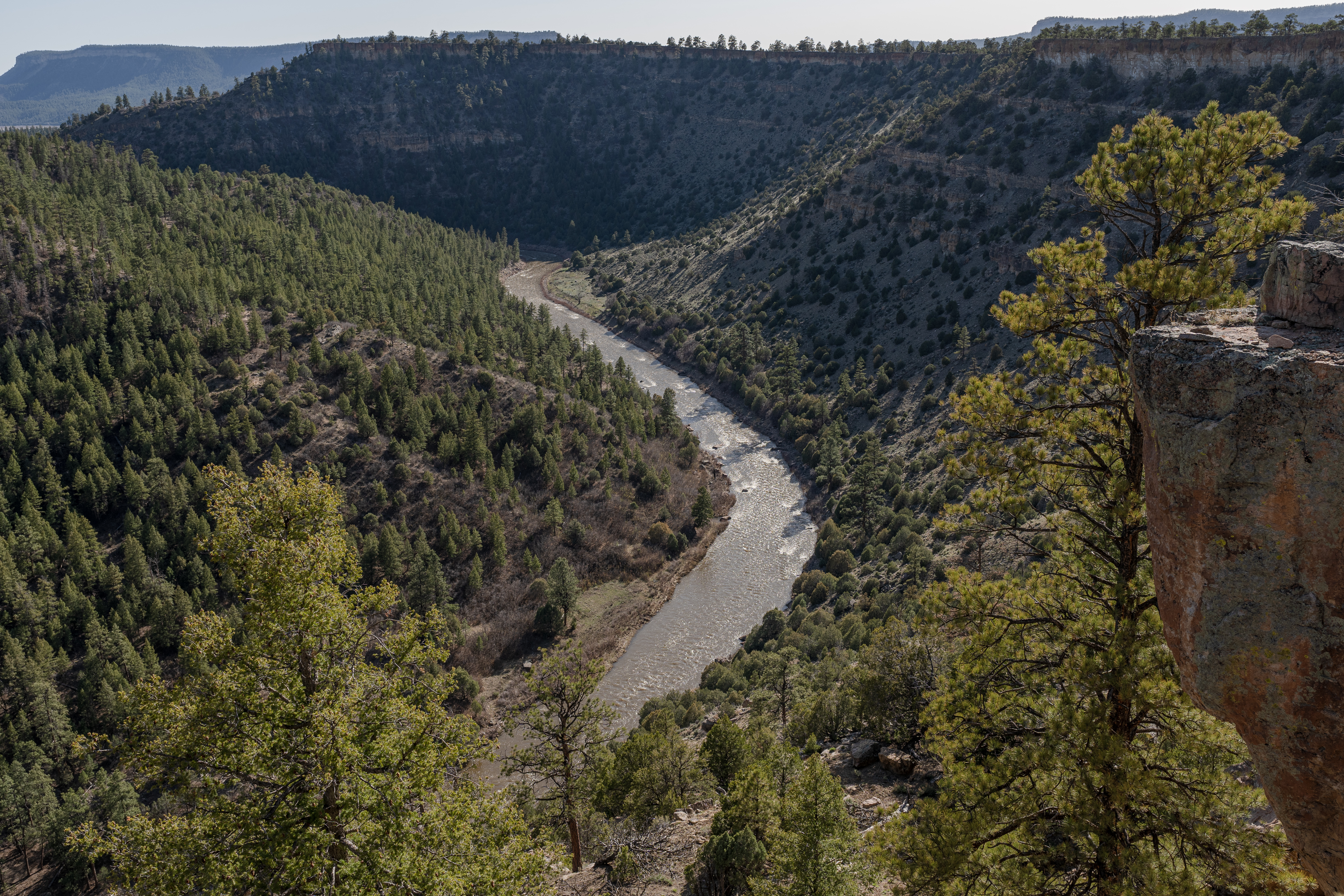
Rio Chama passes through the canyon on the southern end of Heron Lake State Park.

The walls in Chama Canyon rise some 1,500 feet (460 m) above the river. The canyon rim and sloping uplands are "frequently punctuated by steep sandstone and shale outcroppings. Inside the canyon is a plethora of geological wonders including high, steep canyon walls and escarpments consisting of rock slides, ledges, pinnacles and ridges. The bedrock of Chama Canyon is shale, basalt, tuft, sandstone, granite, quartzite and other types of rocks, some of which formed about 110 million years ago."

The Chama Valley is home to dense stands of ponderosa pine, douglas-fir, pinyon, juniper, mountain mahogany, gambel oak, and serviceberry. The riparian area also includes cottonwoods, box elder, willows, hackberry and numerous shrubs that are indigenous to north-central New Mexico. It is teeming with a variety of wildlife including cougars, black bears, elk, mule deer, badgers, bobcats, coyotes, beavers, raccoons, ducks, dippers, spotted sandpipers, Canada geese, turkey, golden eagles, bald eagles, falcons, hawks, owls, turkey vultures, brown and rainbow trout, flathead chub, flathead minnows, white suckers, carp, channel catfish, black crappie, longnose dace, and other species of mammals, birds and fish. Various species of rattlesnakes are found in the adjacent mountain valleys and canyons.

== See also ==
- List of rivers in Colorado
- List of New Mexico rivers
- List of National Wild and Scenic Rivers
- List of tributaries of the Rio Grande
