= Mill Creek (San Juan River tributary) =

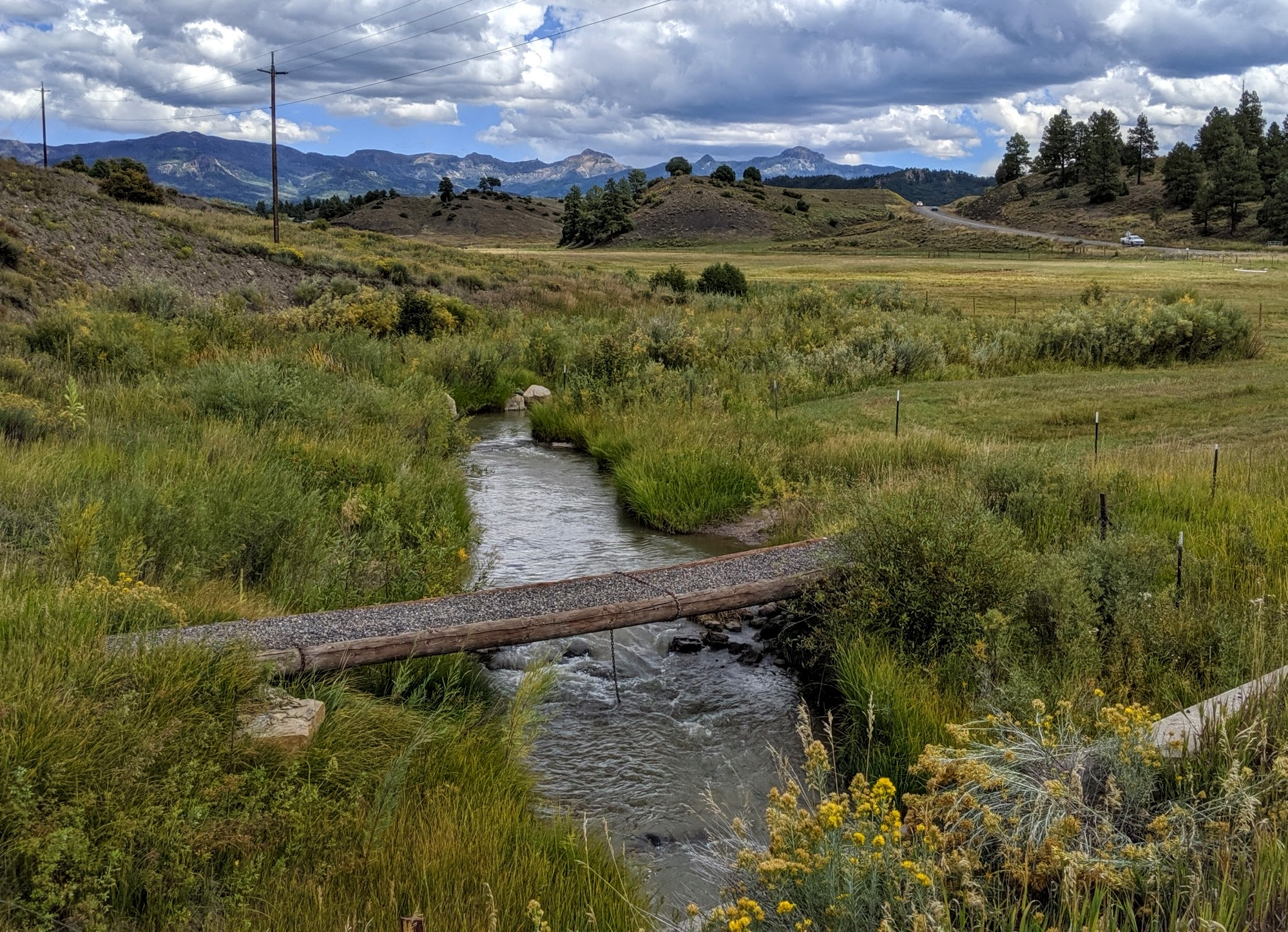
- Looking upstream from Light Plant Road

Location
- Country: United States
- State: Colorado

Physical characteristics
- Source: San Juan National Forest
  - location: East of Pagosa Springs, Colorado
  - coordinates: 37°19′08″N 106°49′40″W
- Mouth: San Juan River (Colorado River tributary)
  - location: South of Pagosa Springs
  - coordinates: 37°14′35″N 107°00′38″W
  - elevation: 6,988 ft (2,130 m)

Mill Creek is a stream in the San Juan National Forest in Archuleta County, Colorado, and a minor left tributary of San Juan River. It flows in a generally southwesterly direction from Mill Creek Canyon, east of Pagosa Springs between Coal Creek and Rio Blanco, to join the San Juan River just sound of Pagosa Springs.

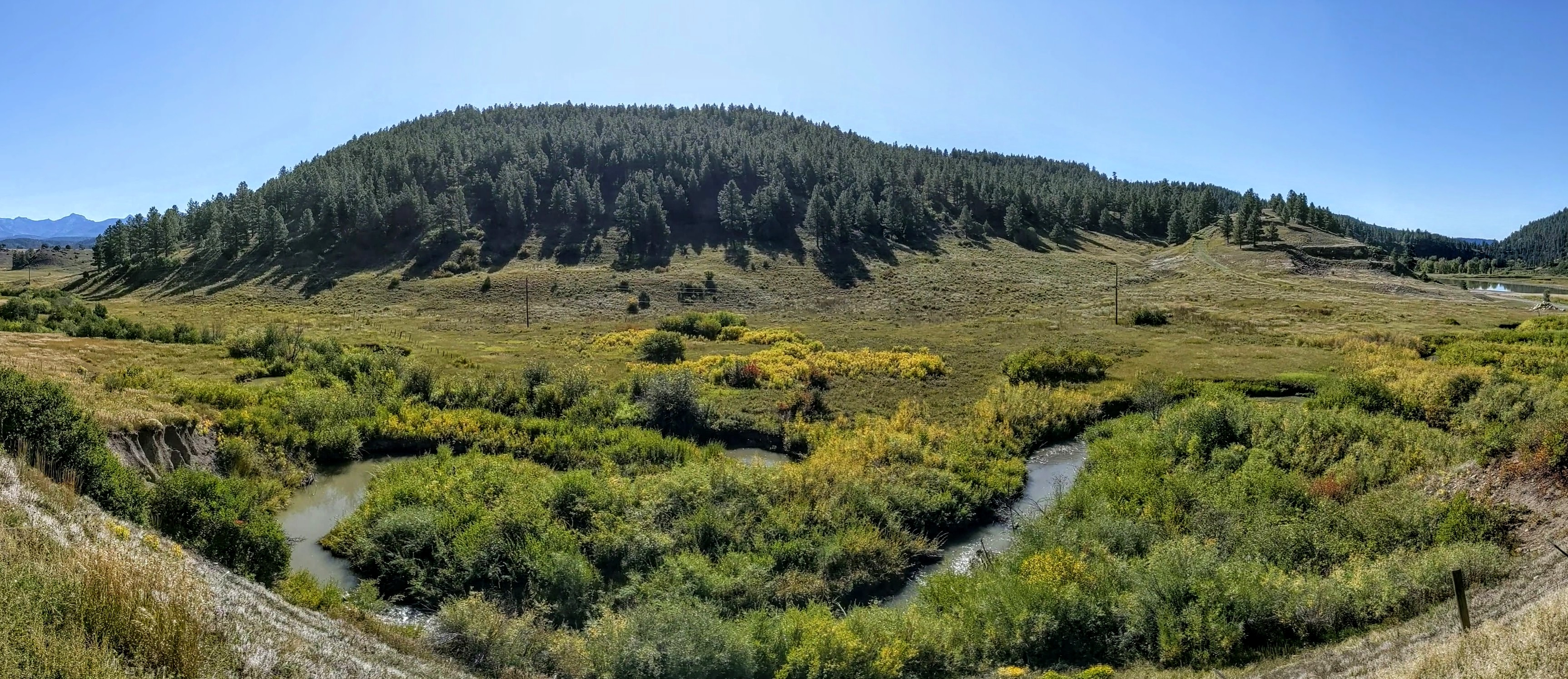
Panoramic view of Mill Creek from Light Plant Road, just above its confluence with the San Juan (visible at right)

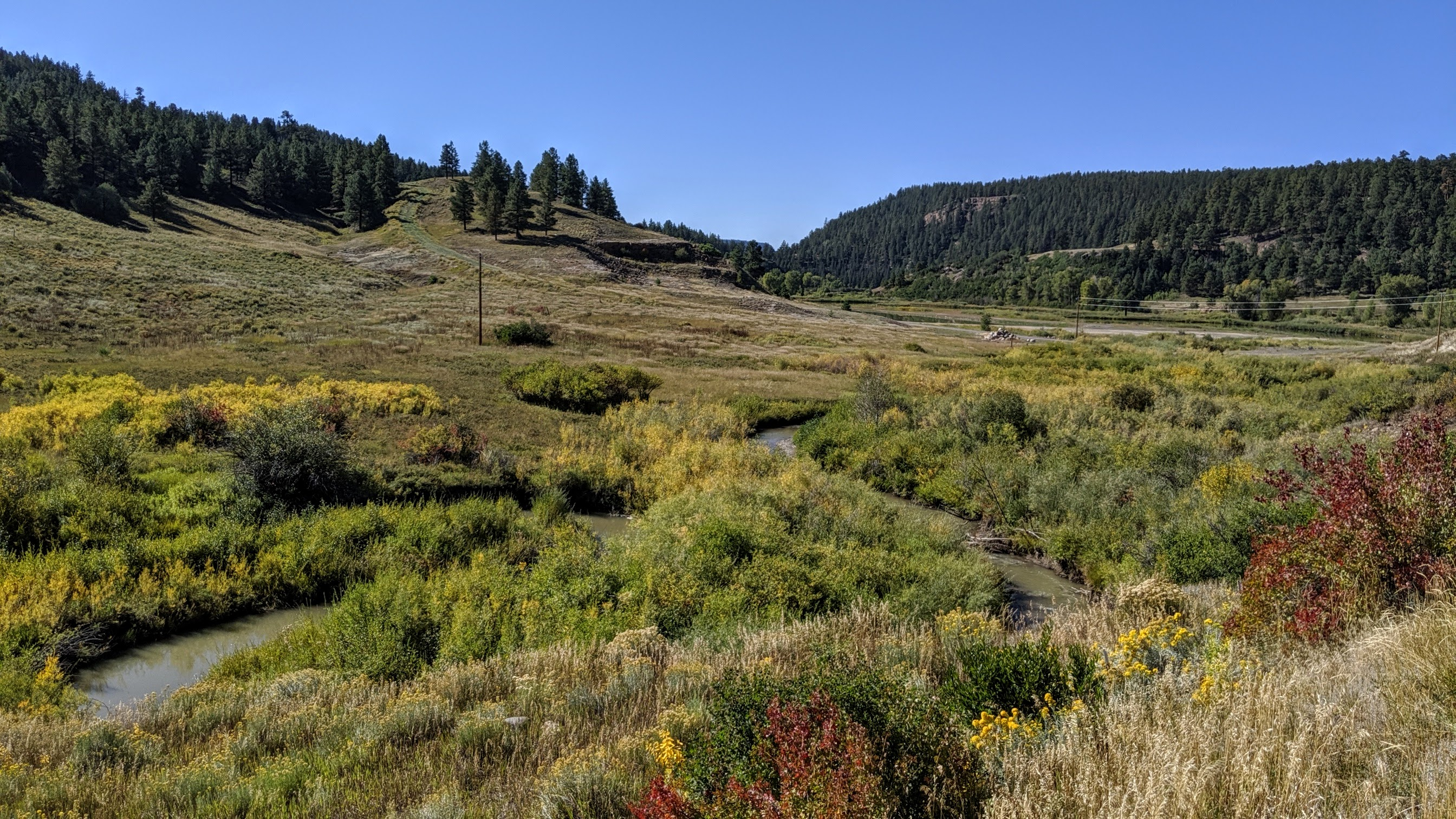
View toward the confluence with the San Juan

== See also ==
- List of rivers of Colorado
