= Senator Archuleta =

Senator Archuleta may refer to:

- Antonio D. Archuleta (1855–1918), Colorado State Senate
- Bob Archuleta (born 1945), California State Senate
