= Little Navajo River =

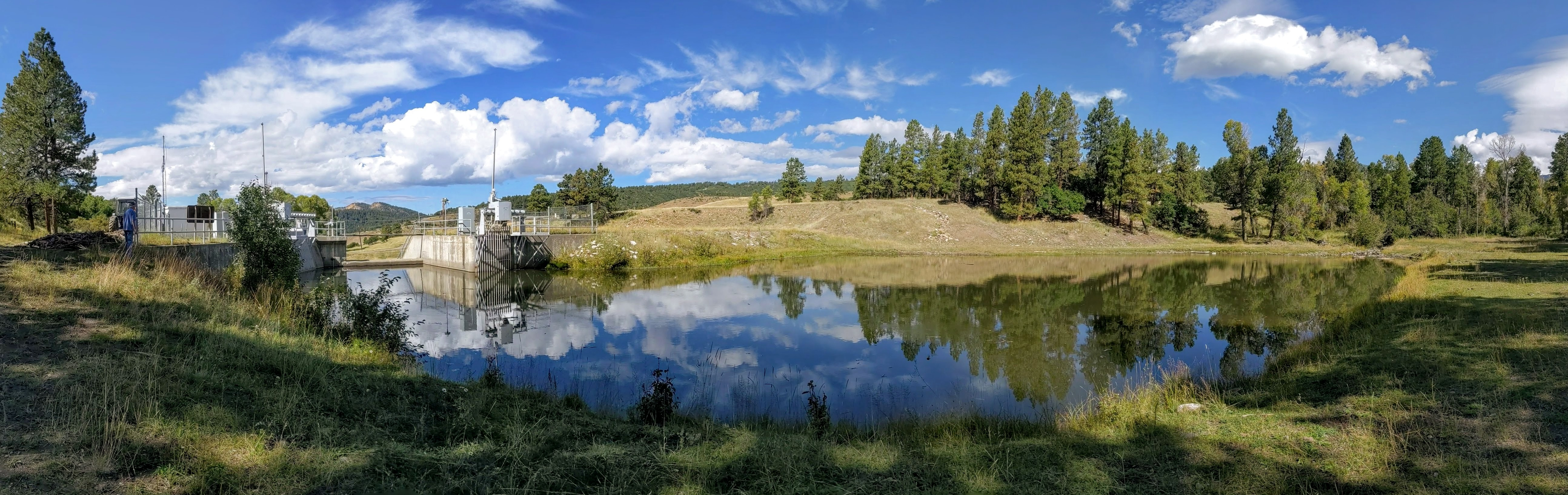
- Reservoir on the Little Navajo River at the Little Oso Diversion Dam

Physical characteristics
- Mouth
  - location: Confluence with Navajo River at Chromo, Colorado
  - coordinates: 37°02′04″N 106°50′43″W

Basin features
- Progression: Little Navajo–Navajo–San Juan–Colorado

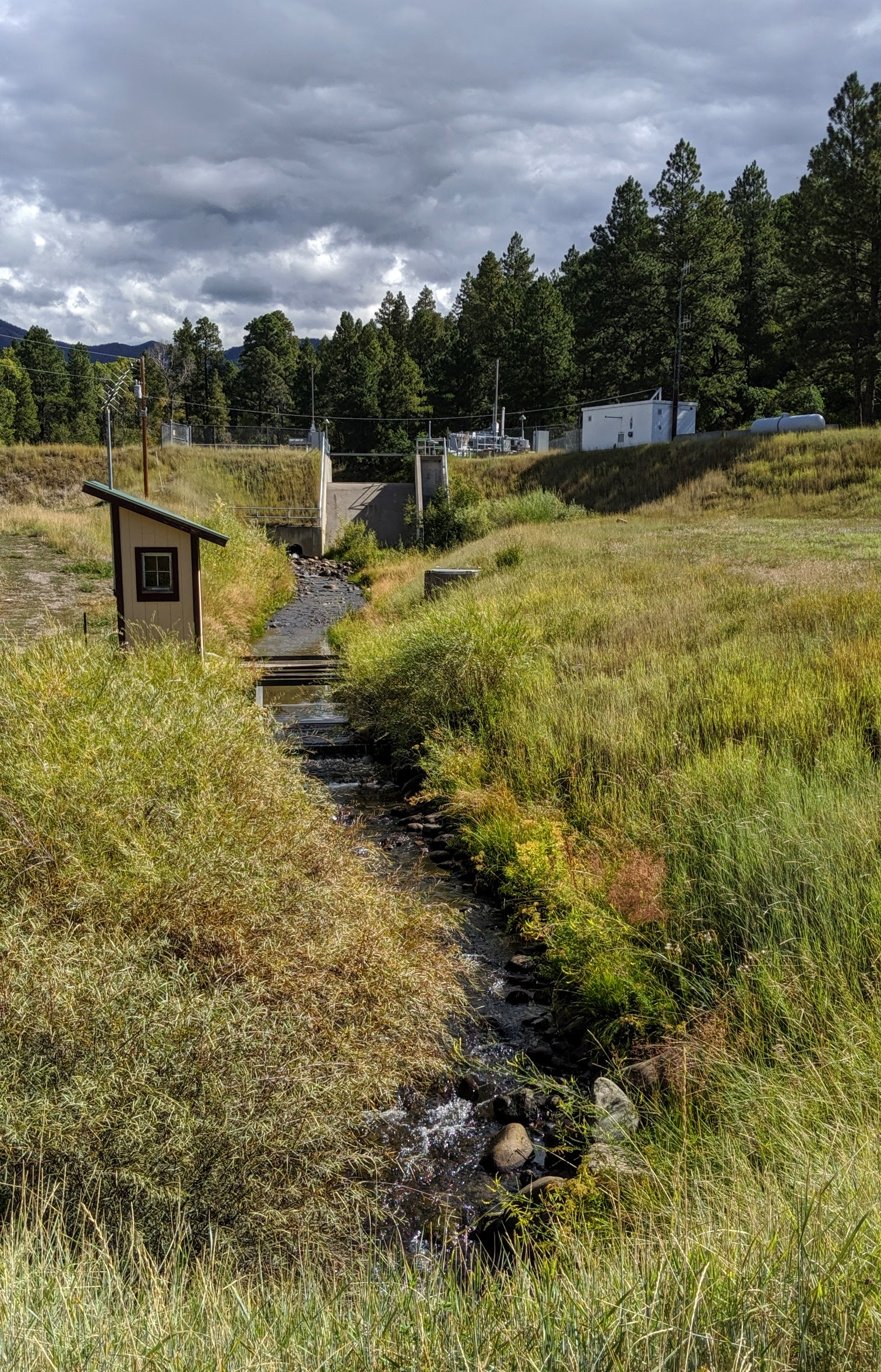
Little Navajo River below the diversion dam

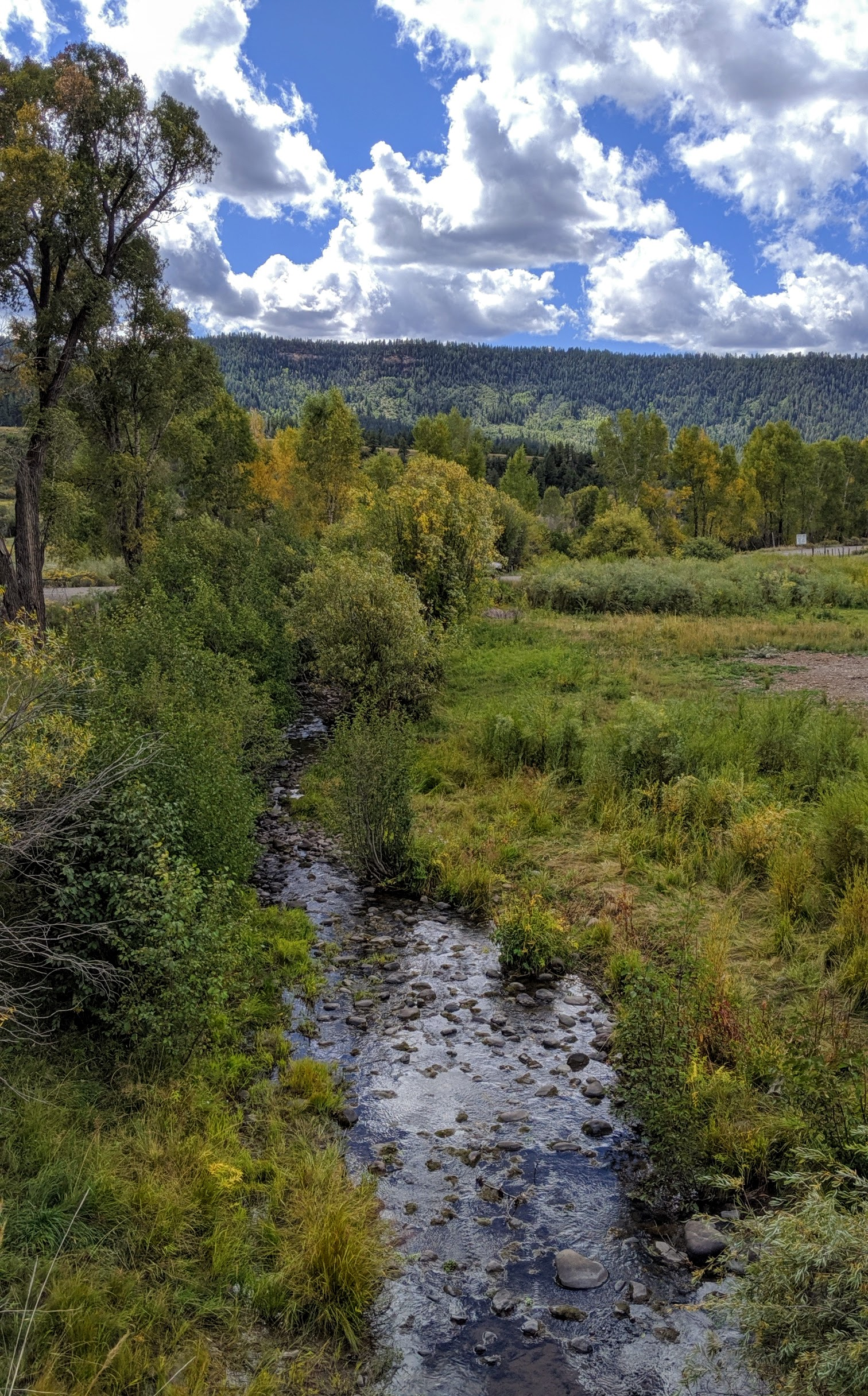
Little Navajo River near its confluence with the Navajo River

The Little Navajo River is a tributary of the Navajo River in Archuleta County, Colorado. It joins the Navajo River at Chromo, Colorado. A large portion of its water is diverted, at the Little Oso Diversion Dam, across the Continental Divide to the Rio Grande basin as part of the San Juan–Chama Project.

== See also ==
- List of rivers of Colorado
