= U.S. Route 84 =

United States Numbered Highway in the United States

U.S. Route 84
- US 84 highlighted in red

Route information
- Length: 1,919 mi (3,088 km)
- Existed: 1926–present

Major junctions
- West end: US 160 at Pagosa Springs, CO
- I-25 / US 85 / US 285 at Santa Fe, NM; I-40 / US 54 at Santa Rosa, NM; I-20 from Roscoe, TX to Abilene, TX; I-35 / US 77 at Waco, TX; I-45 at Fairfield, TX; I-49 near Mansfield, LA; I-55 near Brookhaven, MS; I-59 in Laurel, MS; I-65 at Evergreen, AL; I-75 at Valdosta, GA
- East end: I-95 near Midway, GA

Location
- Country: United States
- States: Colorado, New Mexico, Texas, Louisiana, Mississippi, Alabama, Georgia

Highway system
- United States Numbered Highway System; List; Special; Divided
← US 83	→ US 85

U.S. Route 84 (US 84) is an east–west (Note: US 84 was signed north-south in parts of Colorado and New Mexico.) United States Numbered Highway that started as a short Georgia–Alabama route in the original 1926 scheme. By 1941, it had been extended all the way to Colorado. The highway's eastern terminus is a short distance east of Midway, Georgia, at an Interchange with I-95. The road continues toward the nearby Atlantic Ocean as a county road. Its western terminus is in Pagosa Springs, Colorado, at an intersection with US 160.

The section from Brunswick, Georgia, to Roscoe, Texas, has been designated by five state legislatures as part of the El Camino East–West Corridor. The designation was in recognition of its history as a migration route from the Atlantic coast to the present Mexican border, one of the routes that Spanish settlers called El Camino Real. (In Louisiana, the route was called the Harrisonburg Road.) The designation is intended to promote the route for both tourism and NAFTA-facilitated trade with Mexico. States are asking for federal funds to widen the US 84 El Camino East–West Corridor.

== Route description ==
=== Colorado ===
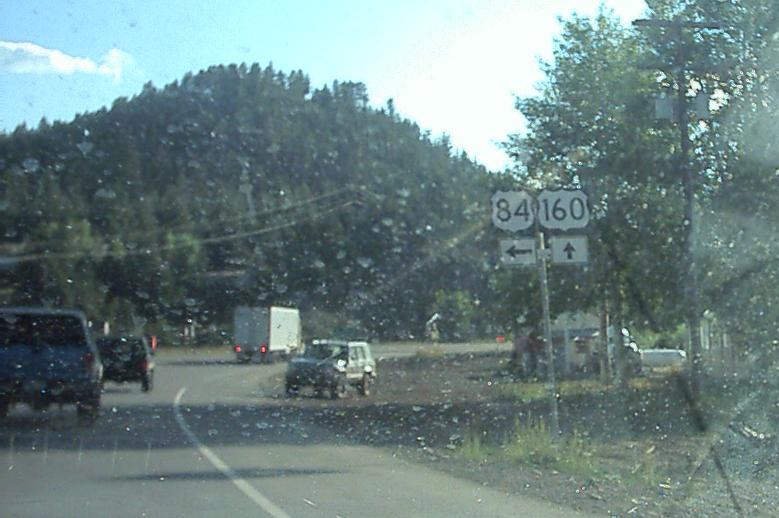
Northern/western terminus at US 160 in Pagosa Springs, CO

The northern terminus of US 84, Pagosa Springs, Colorado, was made famous by C. W. McCall in the 1975 song and album Wolf Creek Pass. US 84 actually ends approximately one mile (1.6 km) east of downtown Pagosa Springs at a T-intersection with US 160 (Main Street).

South of Pagosa Springs, the 28 miles (45 km) of the Colorado section of US 84 pass through a portion of San Juan National Forest. The highway climbs Confar Hill, a drainage divide between the Rio Blanco and Navajo River, before descending into the village of Chromo and passing into New Mexico.

=== New Mexico ===
US 84 enters Rio Arriba County, New Mexico, 28 miles (45 km) south of its terminus at US 160. About six miles (9.7 km) south of the Colorado–New Mexico state line, US 64 comes from the west and runs concurrently with US 84 for the next 28 miles (45 km). Only three miles (4.8 km) east of this intersection, the concurrency crosses the Continental Divide at Sargent Pass, elevation 7,718 feet (2,352 m) above sea level or more than 3,100 feet (940 m) lower than Wolf Creek Pass, the next Continental Divide highway pass to the north. Therefore, only 37 miles (60 km) of US 84 are located west of the Continental Divide. About 12 miles (19 km) east of the intersection, US 64/US 84 enters the town of Chama. At a T-intersection, New Mexico State Road 17 enters from the north and terminates at said intersection, while US 64 and US 84 enter from the south and west.

After heading south from Chama, US 64 and US 84 combine for about 14 miles (23 km) to Tierra Amarilla, where US 64 departs from US 84 and heads southeast, while US 84 continues south. About 57 miles (92 km) down the road, US 84 is joined by US 285 south of the small community of Chili. About five miles (8.0 km) further, US 84/US 285 enters the city of Española from the north as North Paseo de Onate Street. At the south end of the town, US 84/US 285 becomes the Santa Fe Highway and an expressway. About nine miles (14 km) further, US 84/US 285 becomes a limited-access freeway. Another 15 miles (24 km) further south, the two return to surface street status, and then travel past downtown Santa Fe via St. Francis Drive. On the south side of Santa Fe at I-25's exit 282A, US 84/US 285 merges with northbound I-25/US 85. The freeway heads east and slightly to the south to avoid the Sangre de Cristo Mountains. Just before turning north, US 285 exits the freeway at exit 290 and continues south. After winding north and south, the freeway finally begins heading solely north, and US 84 exits about 55 miles (89 km) later at exitv339 near Romeroville and travels in an east/southeast direction, while I-25/US 85 continues north to Colorado. Following a path southeast and then south for 42 miles (68 km), US 84 merges with I-40 (and Historic US 66) at I-40's exit 256. After 17 miles (27 km) I-40/US 84 enters Santa Rosa. About 21 miles (34 km) from its confluence with I-40, US 84 diverges at exit 277.

The highway then travels south/southeast for 42 miles (68 km) until merging with US 60 in downtown Fort Sumner. From the intersection with US 60, US 60/US 84 travels east, passing through Taiban and Melrose before intersecting US 70 after 61 miles (98 km) in Clovis. From the intersection with US 70, US 60/US 70/US 84 travels east 8.7 miles (14.0 km) entering Texico. Here, about 280 feet (85 m) before the Texas–New Mexico state line, US 60 splits from US 70/US 84 as US 70/US 84 continues east into Farwell, Texas. Despite being an east-west route, US 84 is signed north-south between Fort Sumner and the Colorado state line.

=== Texas ===
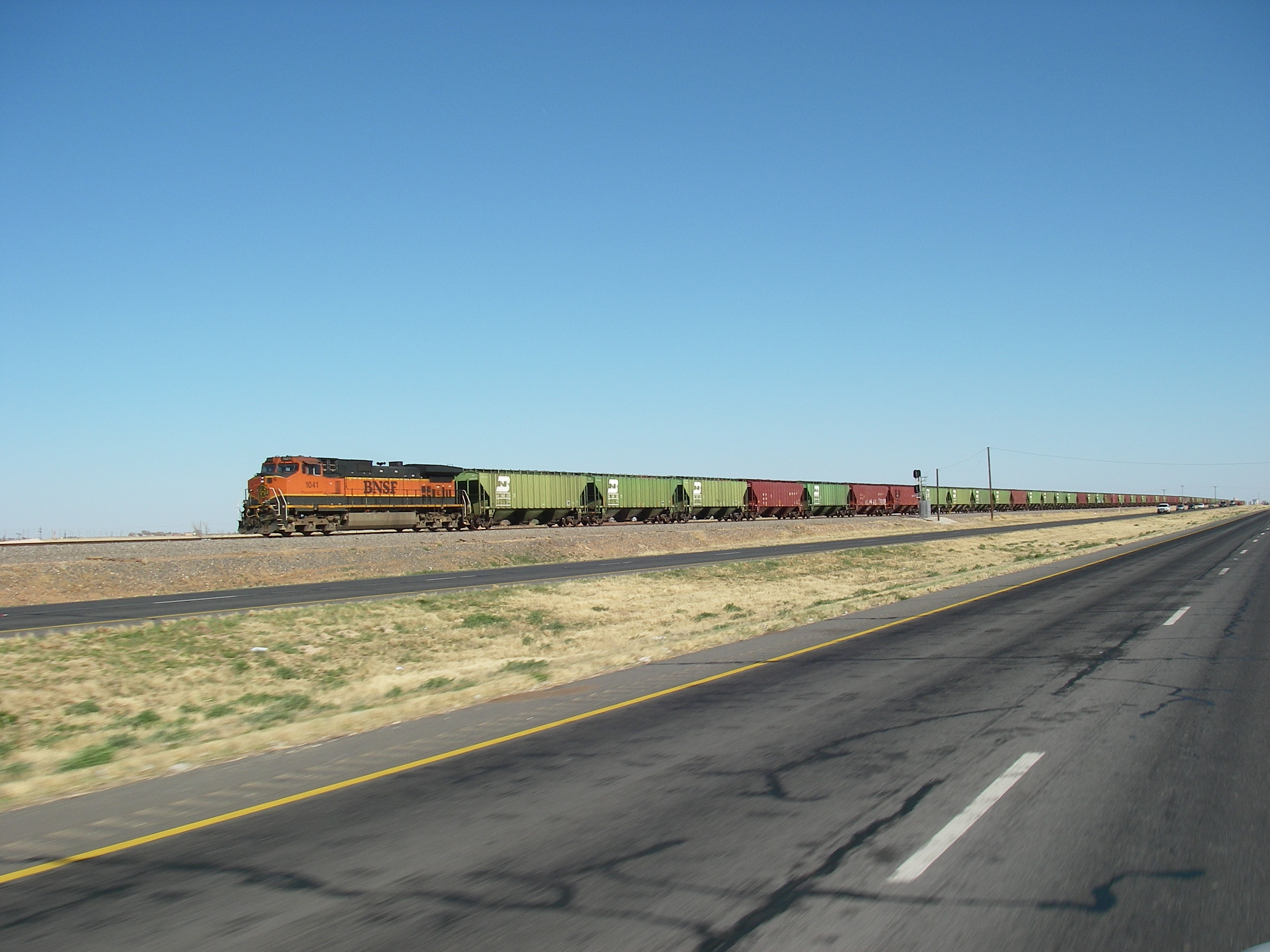
BNSF freight train running parallel to US 84 while crossing the Llano Estacado

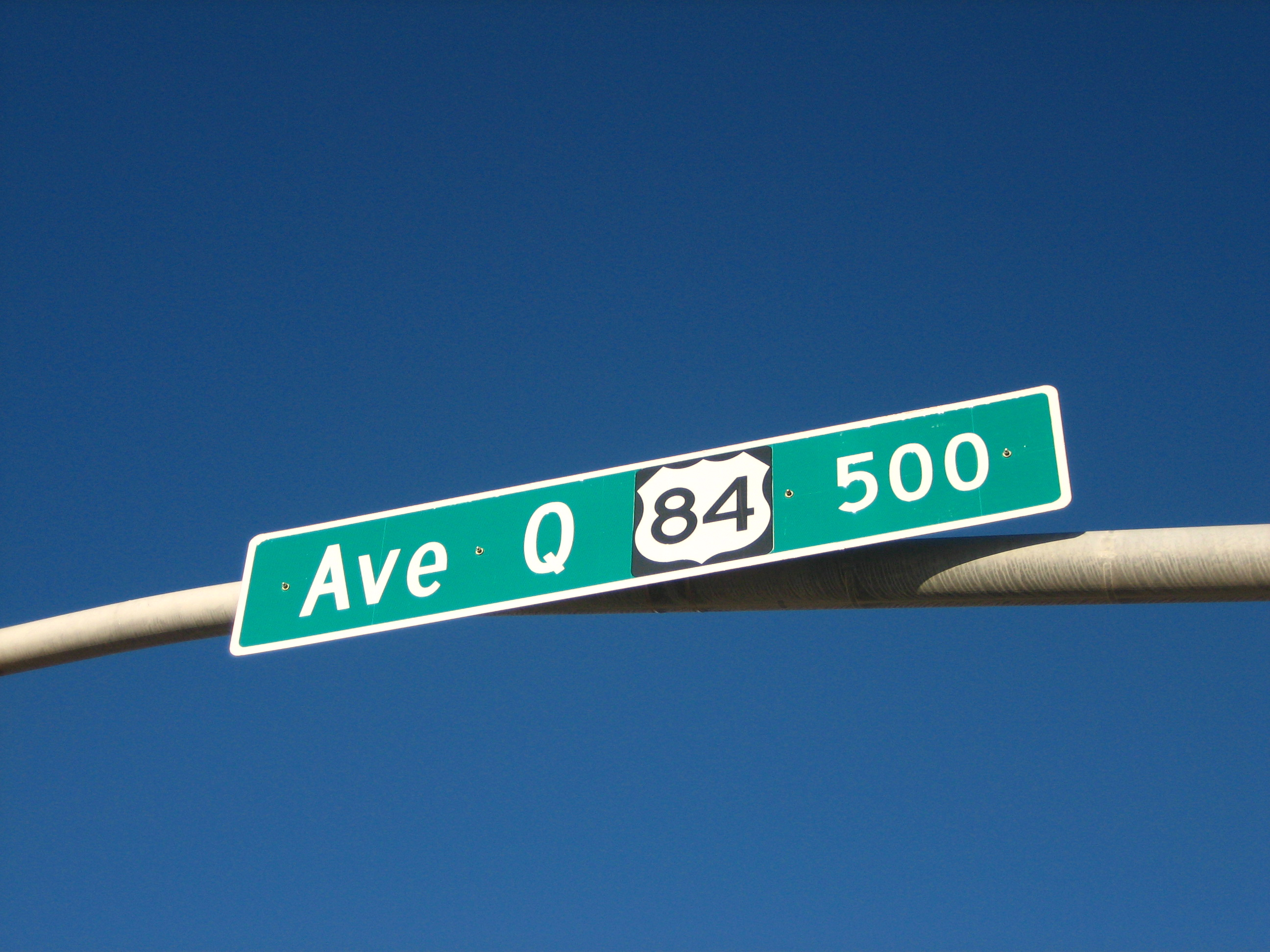
US 84 in Lubbock along Avenue Q, a major downtown thoroughfare

US 70/US 84 crosses into Texas at Farwell. After passing through Farwell, US 70/US 84 veers to the southeast, continuing concurrently until Muleshoe. From Muleshoe, US 70 leaves the route, while US 84 continues on a southeasterly direction across the level plains of the Llano Estacado. Along this stretch, US 84 travels parallel to the BNSF Railway, crosses a sandy section called the Muleshoe Dunes, and then passes Littlefield, the birthplace of country singer Waylon Jennings. US 84 continues in a southeasterly direction through cotton fields and small towns such as Anton and Shallowater, eventually entering Lubbock, the largest city in the South Plains and the birthplace of Buddy Holly. Signed as Avenue Q, US 84 passes through the heart of downtown Lubbock before making a sharp easterly turn on the southeast side of the city, where it is known as the Slaton Highway. After bypassing the town of Slaton, US 84 makes another gentle turn to the east, following a generally southeasterly heading through Post, Snyder, and Roscoe, where it merges with I-20.

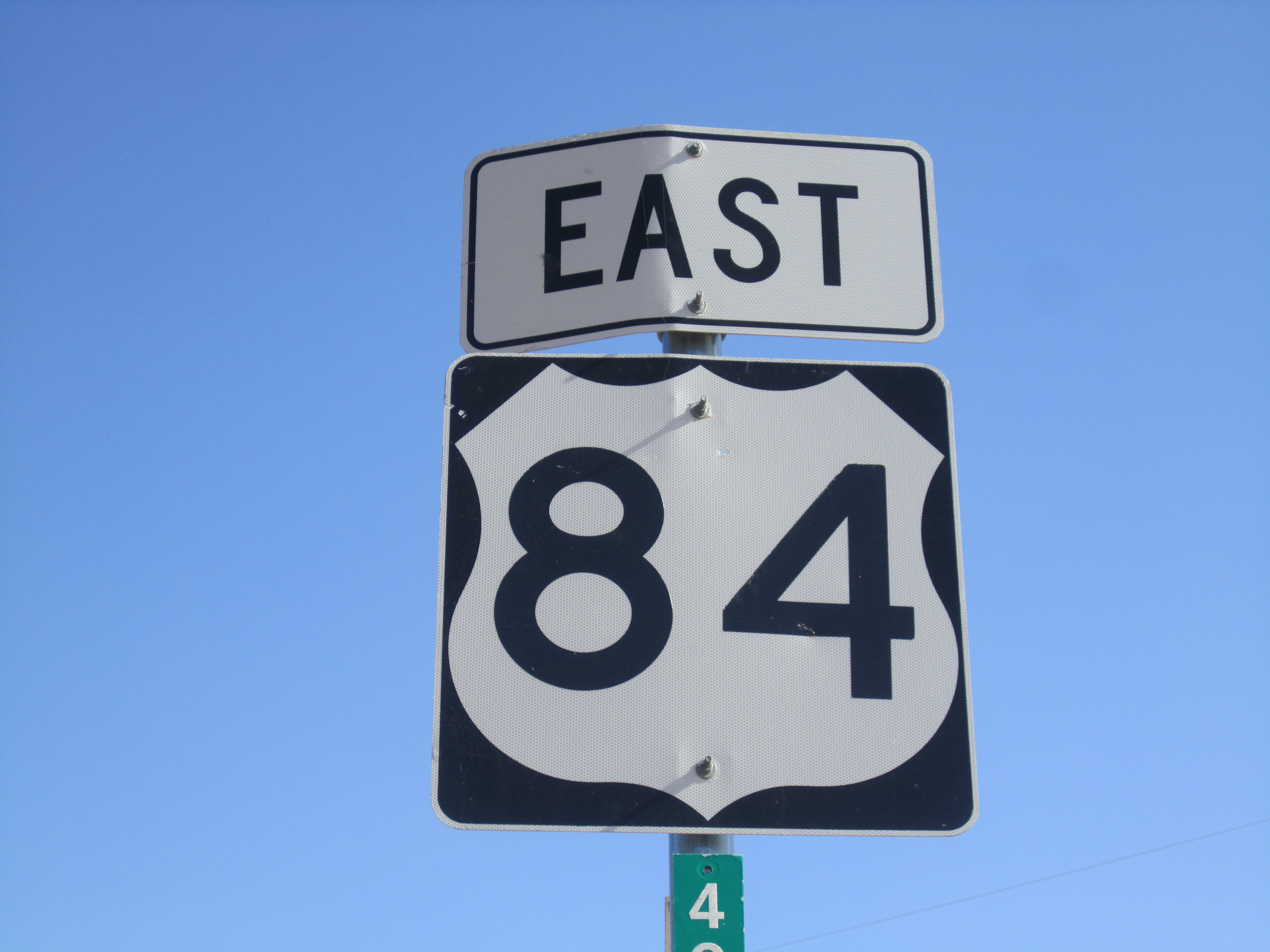
US 84 sign north of Snyder

From this point, US 84 follows I-20, unsigned, until Abilene, where it leaves the Interstate, making a hard southerly turn and forming the western side of a three-quarter loop around the city (along with US 83 and US 277). From the south side of Abilene, US 84 continues concurrently with US 83 until the two highways split about two miles (3.2 km) northeast of Tuscola, and though still signed as east–west, maintains a due north–south heading. US 84 makes a gentle turn back to the southeast at Lawn, following this bearing until Santa Anna, where it merges with US 67 and takes a more due easterly turn.

US 84 merges with US 183 at Brownwood and once again turns to the southeast. The highway continues concurrently until Goldthwaite, where it leaves US 183 and yet again makes a sharp turn to the east. It follows this heading all the way to McGregor. From McGregor, the highway makes a turn to the northeast to Woodway; this stretch of US 84 is also signed as the George W. Bush Parkway. US 84 then crosses into Waco, going past the downtown area along Waco Drive and then northeast into the suburb of Bellmead. After a brief concurrency with State Highway 31 (SH 31) through Bellmead, US 84 continues fairly due east passing through Mexia. Then at Teague, it takes yet another turn to the north before turning back to the east at an intersection with I-45 in Fairfield.

US 84 merges with US 79 and makes another northerly turn southwest of Palestine. The highway splits from US 79 just southwest of downtown before making another turn eastward and passing through town. It follows a gentle northeasterly path all the way to Timpson, passing through the towns of Maydelle; Rusk, where it intersects with US 69; Reklaw; Mount Enterprise, where it intersects US 259; and Timpson, where it merges with US 59 and serves as the northern terminus of SH 87. From Timpson to Tenaha, it briefly runs concurrently with US 59 until its intersection with US 96. From this point, US 84 continues its easterly path through to rest of eastern Texas, passing through Joaquin before crossing into Louisiana across the Sabine River into the town of Logansport.

=== Louisiana ===
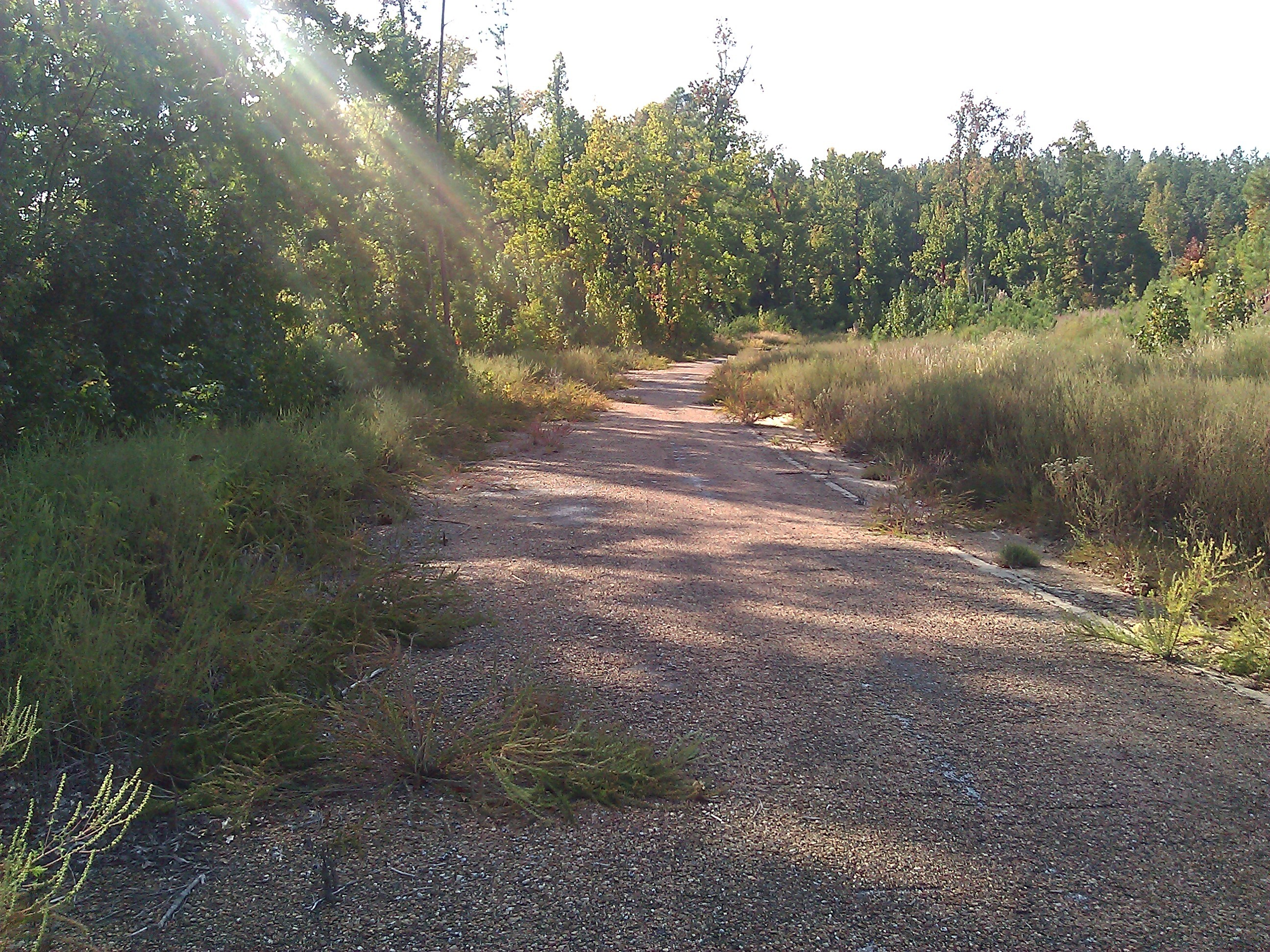
Abandoned section of US 84 east of Jena, Louisiana

Once the highway leaves Logansport, it travels through Stanley and then northeast into Mansfield, where it merges for a brief stretch with US 171. It continues east, crossing under I-49, until it reaches Grand Bayou, where it turns to the southeast, merging with Louisiana Highway 1 (LA 1). After approximately two miles (3.2 km), it turns back again to the east, where it merges with US 71 in Coushatta and stays with that highway until Clarence. It then heads northeast towards Winnfield, where it merges for a short time with US 167. It turns to the northeast towards Joyce, then begins a long stretch to the southeast, passing through Tullos, where it intersects US 165, through the parish seat of Jena, and continues in that direction until it crosses into Catahoula Parish. It bears east through Jonesville until Ferriday, where it merges with US 425. It then heads southeast through Vidalia where it crosses the Mississippi River into Natchez, Mississippi.

=== Mississippi ===
The four-lane Natchez–Vidalia Bridge, crossing the Mississippi River, carries US 84 and US 425 into Natchez. Here, it merges with US 61, which marks the southern terminus of US 425. It then travels approximately four miles (6.4 km) to the northeast where it reaches the western terminus of US 98 at Washington, where it is paired with US 98 until Bude and Meadville. The road continues east, crossing under I-55 and heads east towards Collins. US 84 travels concurrently with I-59 for a short distance through Laurel. It then heads east to Waynesboro and continues to the Alabama state line.

=== Alabama ===
In Alabama, US 84 is paired with unsigned State Route 12 (SR 12). Parts of the route have been widened in recent years to four-lane status. The most significant exist from River Falls eastward to Andalusia, near Opp where a recent bypass of the downtown area now carries US 84 in a southern arc around the town, and from Enterprise eastward thru Daleville and on to the Dothan area and then the Georgia state line at the Chattahoochee River in Saffold.

US 84 has brief stretches concurrent with other US Highways in Alabama. US 84 shares a routing with US 31 from just southwest of Evergreen to a few miles east of town. It briefly shares a routing with US 29 in the city of Andalusia. It also shares a routing with US 331 near Opp. At Dothan, US 84 shares a concurrency with US 231 and US 431 on the Ross Clark Circle which is the circular bypass of downtown.

US 84 crosses three major navigable waterways in Alabama. They are the Tombigbee River at Coffeeville, the Alabama River at Claiborne, and the Chattahoochee River at the Alabama–Georgia state line. US 84 passes through Enterprise and Daleville which are both very near Fort Novosel which is the United States Army's helicopter training school. Most of US 84 in Alabama traverses the Gulf Coastal Plain which is relatively lowlying land with some sand content. The area is heavily agricultural with little heavy industry. Dothan is the largest city in Alabama traversed by US 84 and it is the business and agricultural center of Southeast Alabama. The area is commonly referred to as the Wiregrass Region.

=== Georgia ===
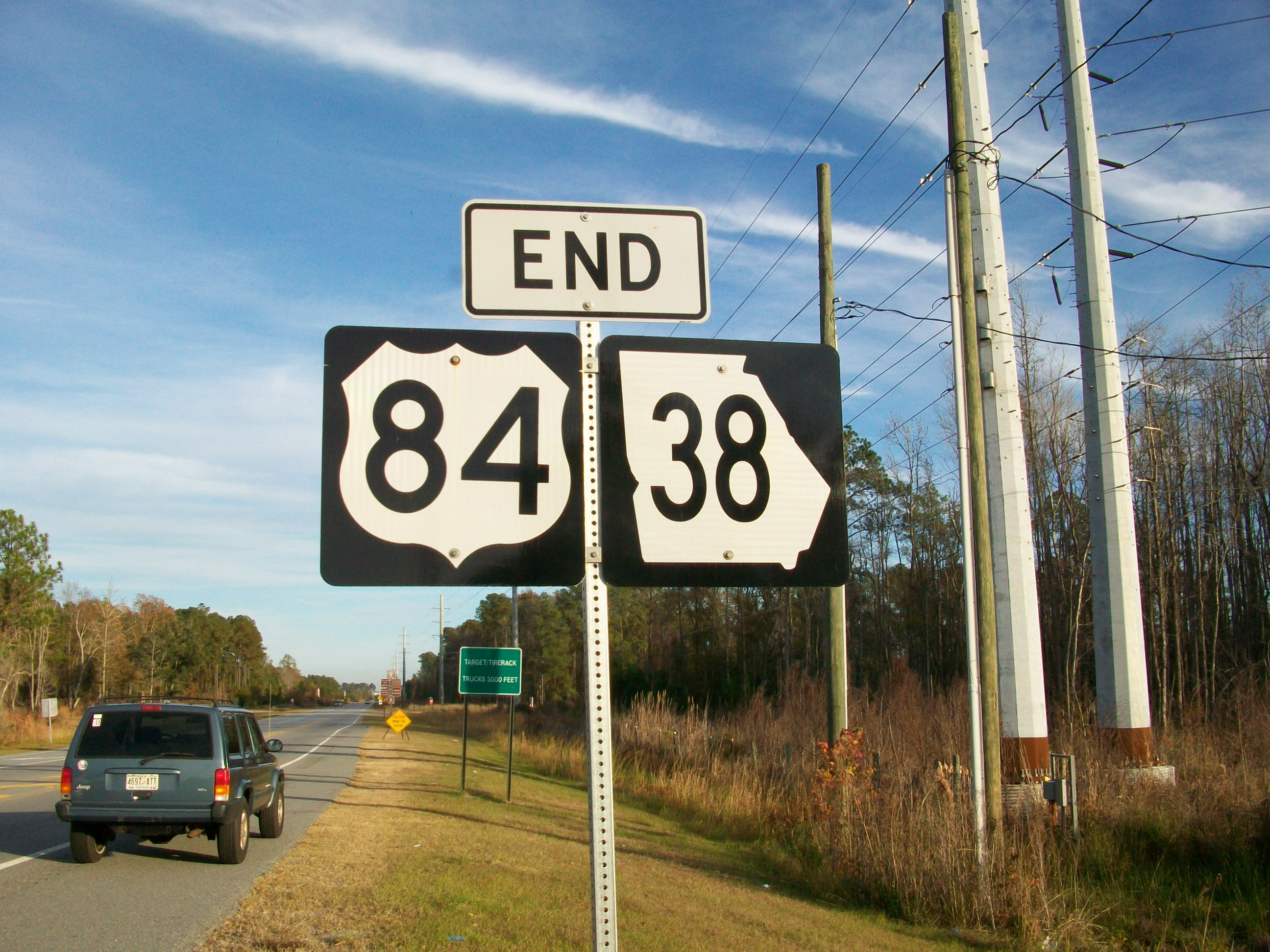
End US 84/SR 38 sign at I-95 east of Midway, Georgia

After entering Georgia from Alabama west of Jakin, Georgia, the route travels through the southern portion of the state, meeting its eastern terminus at I-95 east of Midway. US 84 through Georgia is also known as the Wiregrass Georgia Parkway. After entering the state from Alabama, US 84 travels east to Donalsonville to Bainbridge. The routes travels around the city to the south to a freeway bypass, cosigned with US 27/SR 1. The route continues east through Cairo to Thomasville, where it bypasses downtown to the north and east, cosigned with US 319, then US 19/SR 3/SR 300. The route continues east to Quitman, where it becomes cosigned with US 221 east, past its interchange with I-75, to Valdosta. In Valdosta, US 221 departs, and US 84 continues east-northeast to Waycross, where it is briefly cosigned with US 1, US 23, and US 82. US 84 continues northeast from Waycross, passing through Blackshear before arriving in Jesup. In Jesup, the route becomes cosigned with US 25 and US 301 northeast to Ludowici. In Ludowici, US 25/US 301 departs to the northwest, and US 84 continues northeast to Hinesville. In Hinesville, the route becomes cosigned with SR 196 and takes a turn to the east. After a short distance, SR 196 departs, and US 84/SR 38 continues east to its eastern terminus at exit 76 on I-95 east of Midway.

== History ==
When originally designated in 1926, US 84 was a much shorter route spanning 281 miles (452 km) from Dothan, Alabama, to Brunswick, Georgia. In 1934, the highway was extended west to Farwell, Texas, before its subsequent extension northwest into Colorado. (According to maps and documents held at the Alabama Department of Transportation library in Montgomery, the section between Natchez, Mississippi, and Wagarville, Alabama had been planned as US 86 the year before.)

=== Louisiana ===
Throughout Louisiana, US 84 was largely aligned with the existing SR 6. The major exception was the portion west of Clarence, where SR 6 followed a more southern path from the Texas line through Natchitoches. Additionally, US 84 took advantage of a shorter route between Winnfield and Jena that passed through Tullos rather than Olla. The only major realignment since 1934 occurred about 1955 when an improved road was opened between Mansfield and Coushatta that passed through Grand Bayou rather than Evelyn. That year, the state highway designations co-signed with US 84 were discontinued as part of the 1955 Louisiana Highway renumbering.

=== Mississippi–Alabama ===
Upon its extension, US 84 originally looped southeast on US 45 from Waynesboro to State Line, Mississippi, then east along SR 56 to Wagarville, Alabama, and back to the northeast via US 43 to Grove Hill. This route was bypassed in the 1960s when a more direct connection between Waynesboro and Grove Hill was established.

=== Georgia ===
US 84's original eastern end was in Brunswick, most lately at an intersection with US 25 in the city's center. In 1988, Georgia requested to swap US 84 and US 82 east of Waycross to "provide better directional continuity for both routes". A bypass of Waycross was under construction at the time, and the swap also allowed it to carry a single co-designation of US 1, US 23, and US 82.

== Major intersections ==
Colorado
US 160 in Pagosa Springs
New Mexico
US 64 east of Monero. The highways travel concurrently to south-southwest of Tierra Amarilla.
US 285 north-northwest of Hernandez. The highways travel concurrently to Eldorado at Santa Fe.
I-25 / US 85 south of Santa Fe. The highways travel concurrently to Romeroville.
I-40 west-northwest of Santa Rosa. The highways travel concurrently to Santa Rosa.
US 54 in Santa Rosa. The highways travel concurrently through Santa Rosa.
I-40 in Santa Rosa
I-40 / US 54 in Santa Rosa
US 60 in Fort Sumner. The highways travel concurrently to Texico.
US 70 in Clovis. The highways travel concurrently to Muleshoe, Texas.
Texas
US 385 in Littlefield
US 82 in Lubbock
US 62 in Lubbock
I-27 / US 87 in Lubbock
US 380 in Post. The highways travel concurrently through Post.
US 180 in Snyder
I-20 east of Roscoe. The highways travel concurrently to the Tye–Abilene city line.
US 83 / US 277 in Abilene. US 83/US 84 travels concurrently to east-northeast of Tuscola. US 84/US 277 travels concurrently through Abilene.
US 283 in Coleman. The highways travel concurrently to Santa Anna.
US 67 in Santa Anna. The highways travel concurrently to Early.
US 377 in Brownwood. The highways travel concurrently to Early.
US 183 in Early. The highways travel concurrently to north of Goldthwaite.
US 281 in Evant
I-35 / US 77 in Waco
I-45 in Fairfield
US 79 northeast of Oakwood. The highways travel concurrently to Palestine.
US 287 in Palestine. The highways travel concurrently through Palestine.
US 69 in Rusk
US 259 in Mount Enterprise
Future I-69 / US 59 in Timpson. The highways travel concurrently to Tenaha.
Future I-69 / Future I-369 / US 59 / US 96 in Tenaha. I-69/US 84 will travel concurrently to Logansport, Louisiana.
Louisiana
US 171 in Mansfield. The highways travel concurrently through Mansfield.
I-49 east of Mansfield
US 371 west of Coushatta. The highways travel concurrently to Coushatta.
US 71 in Coushatta. The highways travel concurrently to Clarence.
US 167 in Winnfield. The highways travel concurrently to east of Winnfield.
US 165 in Tullos
US 425 in Ferriday. The highways travel concurrently to Natchez.
Mississippi
US 61 / US 425 in Natchez. US 61/US 84 travel concurrently to west-southwest of Washington.
US 61 / US 98 west-southwest of Washington. US 84/US 98 travels concurrently to Bude.
I-55 south-southwest of Brookhaven
US 51 south of Brookhaven
US 49 in Collins
I-59 in Laurel. The highways travel concurrently through Laurel.
US 45 in Waynesboro
Alabama
US 43 in Grove Hill
I-65 west-southwest of Evergreen
US 31 southwest of Evergreen. The highways travel concurrently to east of Evergreen.
US 29 in Andalusia. The highways travel concurrently through Andalusia.
US 331 in Opp. The highways travel concurrently through Opp.
US 231 in Dothan. The highways travel concurrently through Dothan.
US 431 in Dothan. The highways share a hidden concurrency through Dothan.
Georgia
US 27 in Bainbridge. The highways travel concurrently through Bainbridge.
US 319 north-northwest of Thomasville. The highways travel concurrently to north-northeast of Thomasville.
US 19 / US 319 north-northeast of Thomasville. US 19/US 84 travels concurrently to east of Thomasville.
US 221 in Quitman. The highways travel concurrently to Valdosta.
I-75 in Valdosta
US 41 / US 221 in Valdosta
US 129 in Stockton
US 441 in Homerville
US 1 / US 23 / US 82 in Waycross. The highways travel concurrently through Waycross.
US 341 in Jesup
US 25 / US 301 in Jesup. The highways travel concurrently to Ludowici.
US 17 in Midway
I-95 in Midway

== Notes ==
Browse numbered routes
← SH 83	CO	→ US 85
← LA 83	LA	→ LA 85
← US 82	MS	→ US 90
