= Juanita, Colorado =

Coordinates: 37°1′38.03″N 107°9′2.15″W

Juanita, elevation 6,375 feet (1,943 meters), is a ghost town in Archuleta County in southwest Colorado.
