= San Juan–Chama Project =

Water management project in New Mexico and Colorado

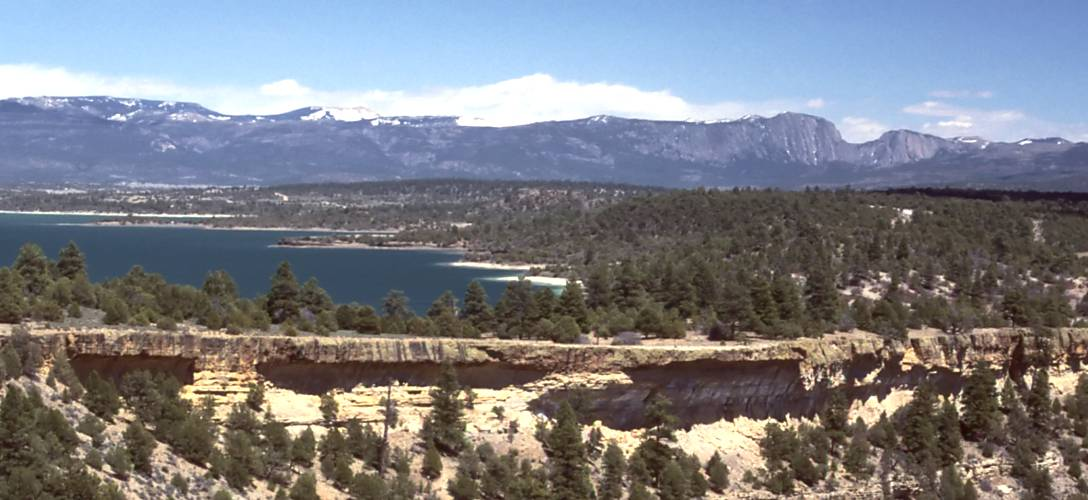
- Heron Lake, the main storage reservoir of the San Juan–Chama Project

General statistics
- Begun: 1951
- Completed: 1976
- Dams and reservoirs: Heron; Nambe Falls; Blanco (diversion); Oso (diversion); Little Oso (diversion)

Operations
- Storage capacity: 403,343 acre⋅ft (0.497516 km^{3})
- Annual water yield: 110,000 acre⋅ft (0.14 km^{3})
- Land irrigated: 92,479 acres (37,425 ha)

The San Juan–Chama Project is a U.S. Bureau of Reclamation interbasin water transfer project located in the states of New Mexico and Colorado in the United States. The project consists of a series of tunnels and diversions that take water from the drainage basin of the San Juan River – a tributary of the Colorado River – to supplement water resources in the Rio Grande watershed. The project furnishes water for irrigation and municipal water supply to cities along the Rio Grande including Albuquerque and Santa Fe.

== Background ==
Most major agricultural and urban areas in New Mexico today lie along the narrow corridor of the Rio Grande as it cuts across the center of this predominantly desert state. Spanish settlers arrived in the area in the late 1500s, followed by Mexican and American settlers in the 18th and 19th centuries, building large irrigation systems and diversion dams to allow agricultural production in the arid region. In the early 1920s, water supply in the Rio Grande basin was already severely stressed, and studies were conducted as to the feasibility of procuring additional water by transbasin diversion from tributaries of the San Juan River.

The 1933–1934 Bunger Survey studied potential locations for diversions and storage reservoirs, and in 1939, the Rio Grande Compact was signed, dividing Rio Grande waters between Colorado, New Mexico, and Texas including allocations from a potential future diversion from the San Juan basin. When the Upper Colorado River Basin Compact was established in 1948, it also included provisions for the tentative diversion project under its water allotment to New Mexico. In the 1950s, post-World War II population growth in central New Mexico put even larger strains on the Rio Grande's water, and the need for a transbasin water project rose because water supplies in the area quickly became overallocated.

Studies for the project continued through the early 1950s, but actual implementation languished until 1962 when Congress amended the Colorado River Storage Act of 1956, allowing the diversion of part of New Mexico's share of Colorado River basin waters into the Rio Grande basin. The diversions proposed were for 235,000 acre⋅ft (0.290 km^{3}) per year from three tributaries of the San Juan River in Colorado: the Rio Blanco, Navajo and Little Navajo Rivers, to the headwaters of the Rio Chama, a major tributary of the Rio Grande. The project would be constructed in two phases. However, Reclamation ran into difficulties because the Navajo Nation asserted rights to about 900,000 acre⋅ft (1.1 km^{3}) of water from the San Juan River, which runs through their traditional lands. Resultantly, only the first phase of the project was ever constructed, delivering just under 47% of the original amount proposed by Reclamation.

On December 19, 1964, construction began on the Azotea Tunnel, the main water tunnel for the project, running from the Navajo River south to Azotea Creek in the Rio Chama watershed. Work started on the Oso and Little Oso tunnels in February 1966, and construction on the Blanco Tunnel began in March of the same year. In 1967, an enlargement of the outlets of existing El Vado Dam to accommodate increased flows from the diversion project was completed, and construction began on Heron Dam, which would impound the project's main storage reservoir. Azotea Tunnel was holed through and construction was finished on the project's three diversion dams in 1970. Heron Dam was completed the next year. Nambe Falls Dam, completed in 1976, was the last part of the project to be built. The dam was the only one built of a series of small independent irrigation units originally proposed under the project to serve Native American lands. In 1978, Reclamation announced the completion of the San Juan–Chama Project.

== Project description ==
=== Diversion works ===
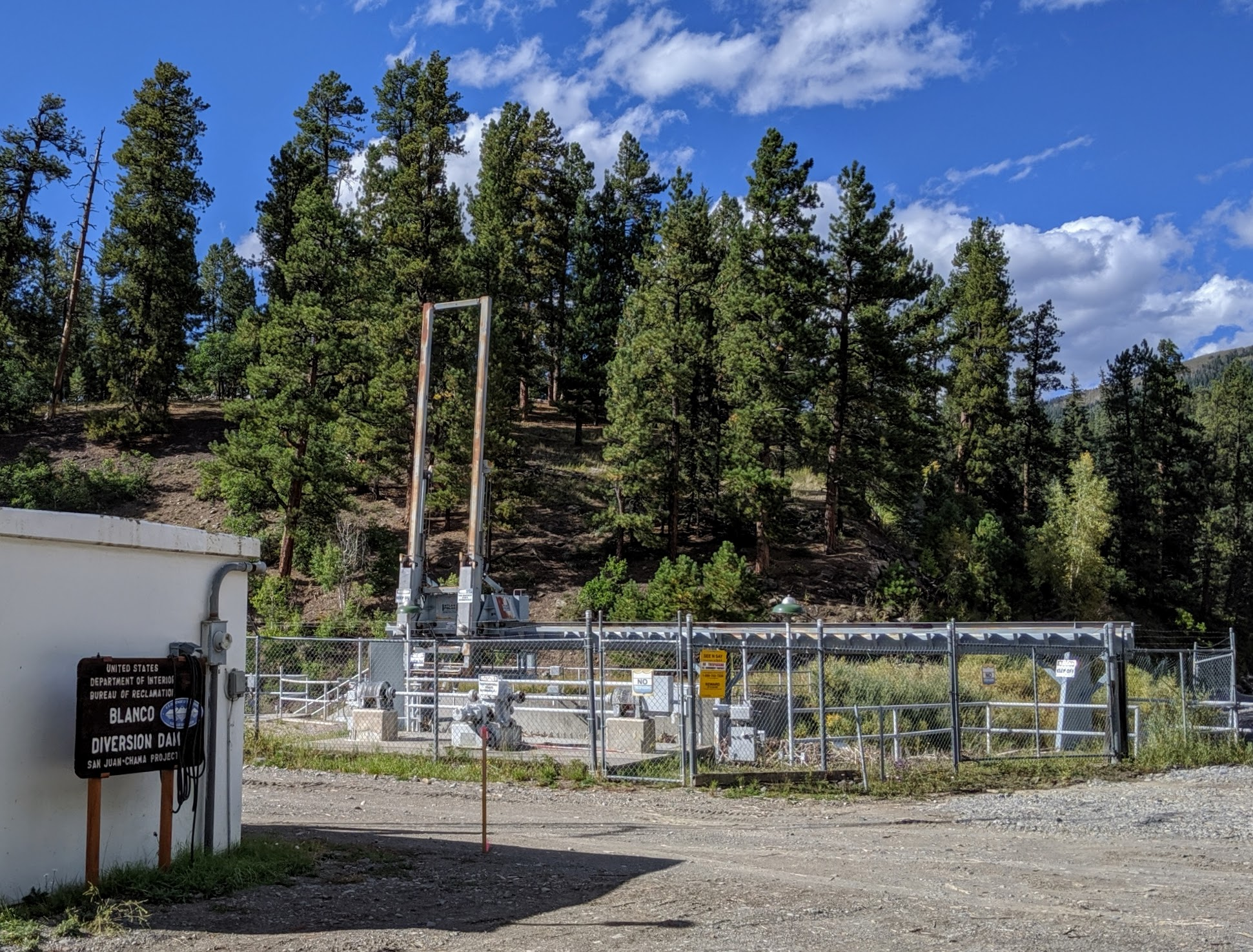
Blanco Diversion Dam on the Rio Blanco

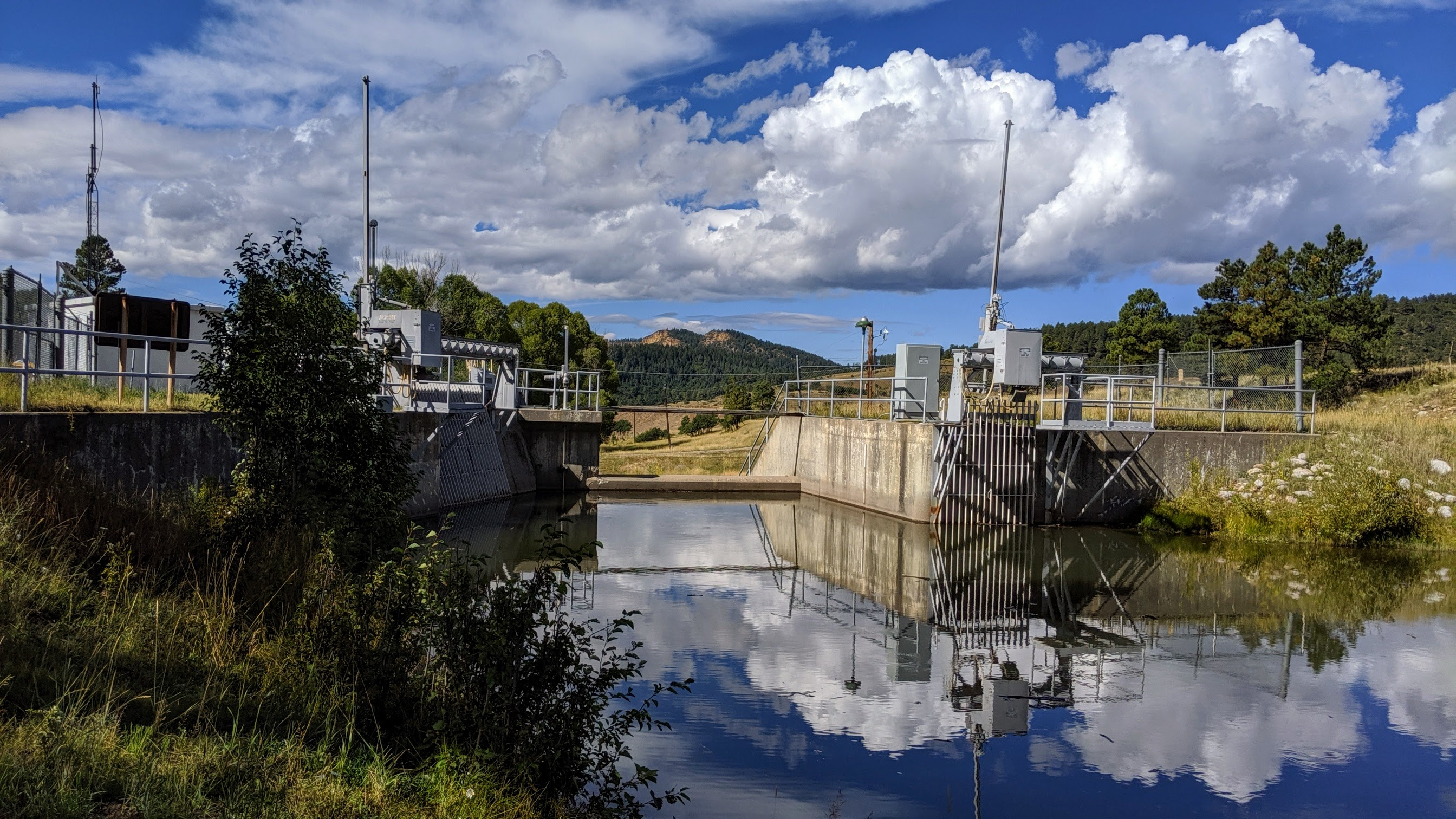
Little Oso Diversion Dam on the Little Navajo River

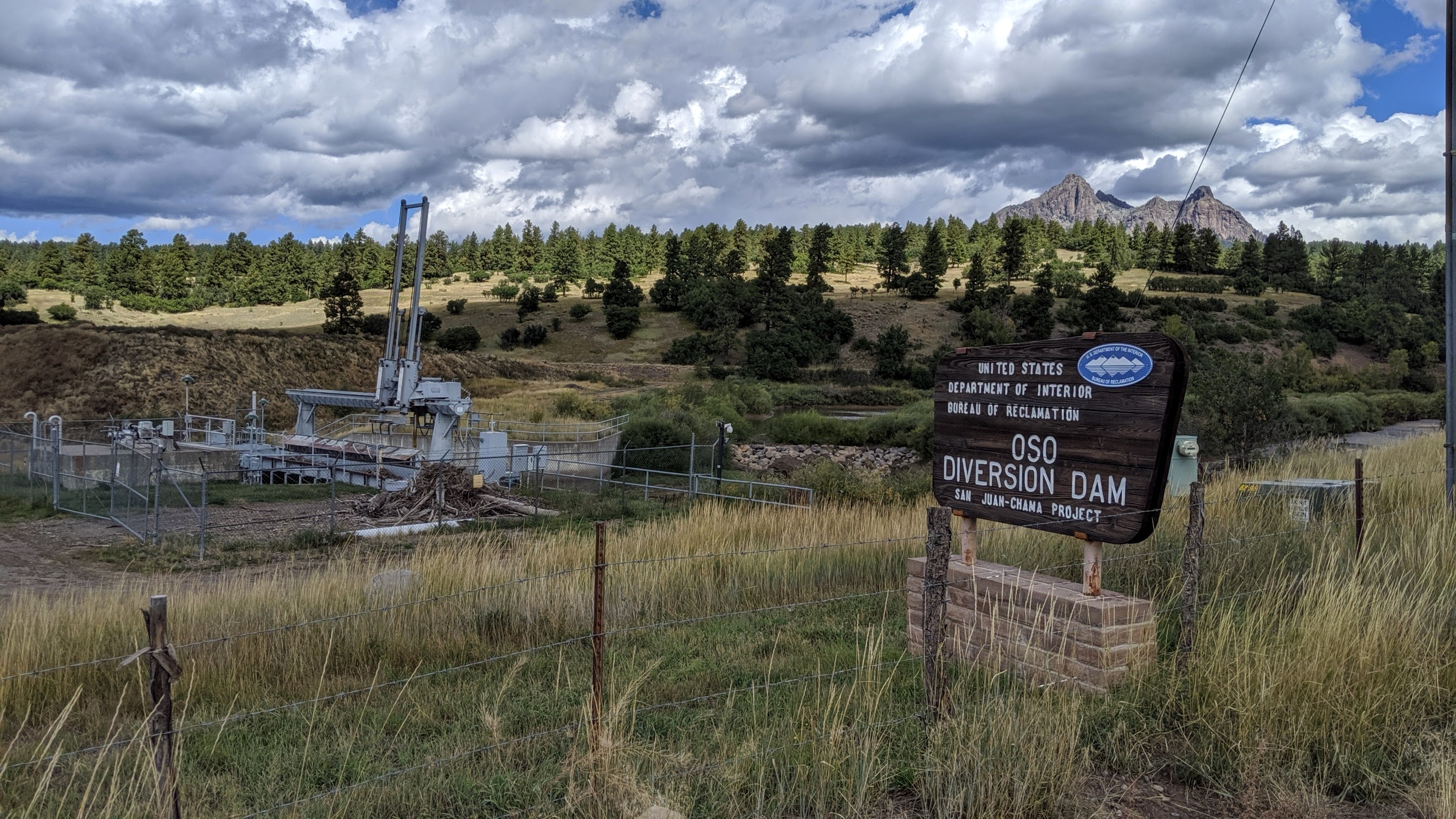
Oso Diversion Dam on the Navajo River

The San Juan–Chama Project taps the water of the Rio Blanco, Navajo, and Little Navajo Rivers via a series of small diversion dams, tunnels, and siphons. Blanco Diversion Dam, with a diversion capacity of 520 cu ft/s (15 m^{3}/s), sends water into the Blanco Feeder Conduit, which connects to the 8.64-mile (13.90 km)-long Blanco Tunnel and flows south towards the Little Navajo River. The water passes underneath the river via the Little Oso Siphon and connects to the Oso Tunnel. Just upstream from the siphon, Little Oso Diversion Dam sends up to 150 cu ft/s (4.2 m^{3}/s) of water through the Little Oso Feeder Conduit, which also empties into the Oso Tunnel.

Oso Tunnel, with a capacity of 650 cu ft/s (18 m^{3}/s), travels 5.05 miles (8.13 km) south to the Navajo River, which it passes under via the Oso Siphon. Oso Diversion Dam on the Navajo diverts additional water into the Oso Feeder Conduit, which joins with water from the Oso Tunnel and Siphon to form the Azotea Tunnel. The Azotea Tunnel, which has a capacity of 950 cu ft/s (27 m^{3}/s), runs south for 12.8 miles (20.6 km), passing under the Continental Divide. The tunnel terminates at Azotea Creek, a tributary of Willow Creek, which is in turn a tributary of the Rio Chama. The lower portion of Azotea Creek has been channelized to mitigate erosion from the higher flows.

=== Storage facilities ===
The main storage facility for the project is Heron Lake, a reservoir formed by Heron Dam on Willow Creek about 8 miles (13 km) downstream of the terminus of Azotea Tunnel and 20 miles (32 km) southwest of Chama, New Mexico. The reservoir has a capacity of 401,320 acre⋅ft (0.49502 km^{3}) and has a surface area of 5,950 acres (2,410 ha). Heron Dam is an earthfill dam 269 feet (82 m) high and 1,220 feet (370 m) long, standing 249.1 feet (75.9 m) above the streambed. Heron Lake receives water from a catchment of 193 sq mi (500 km^{2}), which has been augmented to over three times this size by the San Juan–Chama diversions.

Nambe Falls Dam is located about 15 miles (24 km) north of Santa Fe on the Rio Nambe, a tributary of the Rio Grande. The dam and reservoir are functionally independent from the other facilities of the San Juan–Chama Project. The curved earthfill dam forms Nambe Falls Lake, which has a capacity of 2,023 acre⋅ft (2,495,000 m^{3}) and controls runoff from a catchment of 35 sq mi (91 km^{2}). Its main purpose is to provide irrigation water for about 2,800 acres (1,100 ha) in the Pojoaque Valley, which is situated west and downstream of the dam.

== Water allocations ==
Each year, a minimum of 86,210 acre⋅ft (0.10634 km^{3}) of San Juan–Chama water is allocated as follows. Because annual diversions average about 110,000 acre⋅ft (0.14 km^{3}), there is usually a surplus available for other uses along the river. About 75% of the water serves municipal and industrial uses; the remaining fourth furnishes irrigation supplies to approximately 92,500 acres (37,400 ha) of land along the Rio Grande and Rio Nambe. Surplus water is also used to maintain a permanent pool at the Cochiti Lake flood-control reservoir on the Rio Grande.

Water allocations of the San Juan–Chama Project
User	Share (acre feet)	Percent
Albuquerque, New Mexico	48,200	55.91%
Middle Rio Grande Conservancy District	20,900	24.24%
Jicarilla Apache	6,500	7.54%
Santa Fe County, New Mexico	5,605	6.50%
Los Alamos County, New Mexico	1,200	1.39%
Pojoaque Valley Irrigation District	1,030	1.19%
Española, New Mexico	1,000	1.16%
Belen, New Mexico	500	0.06%
Los Lunas, New Mexico	400	0.05%
Taos, New Mexico	400	0.05%
Bernalillo, New Mexico	400	0.05%
Red River, New Mexico	60	0.01%
Twining Water and Sanitation District	15	0.01%

== Panoramic views ==
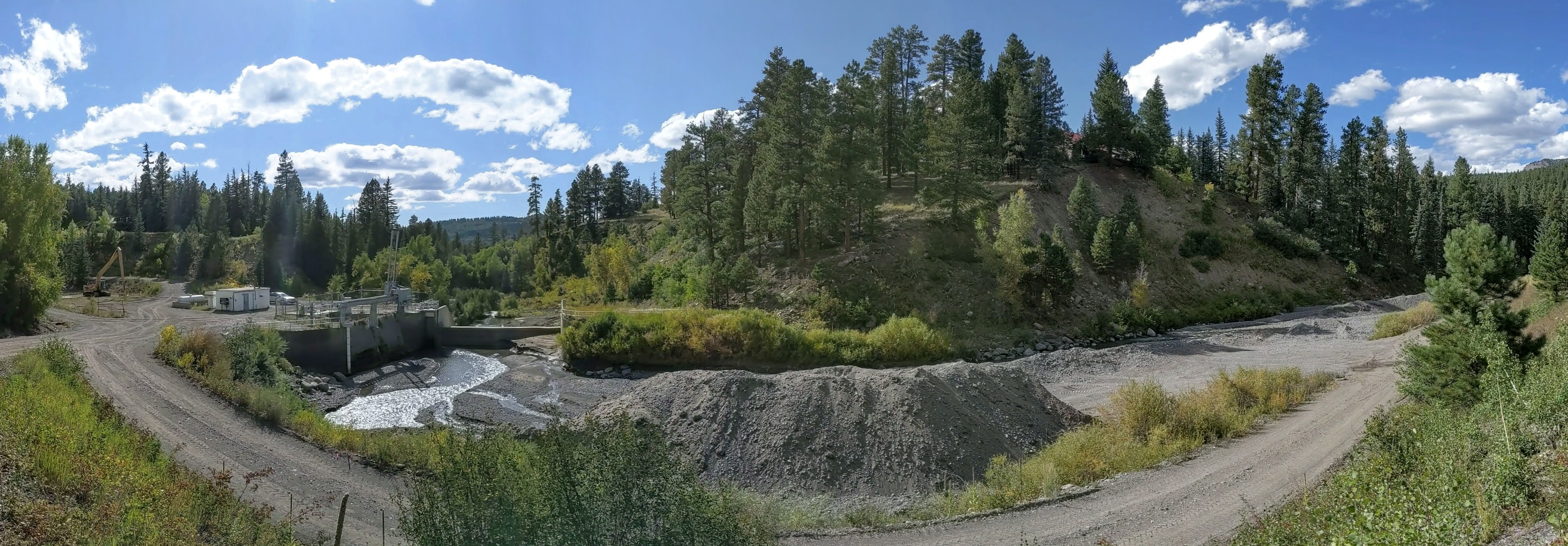
Blanco Diversion Dam
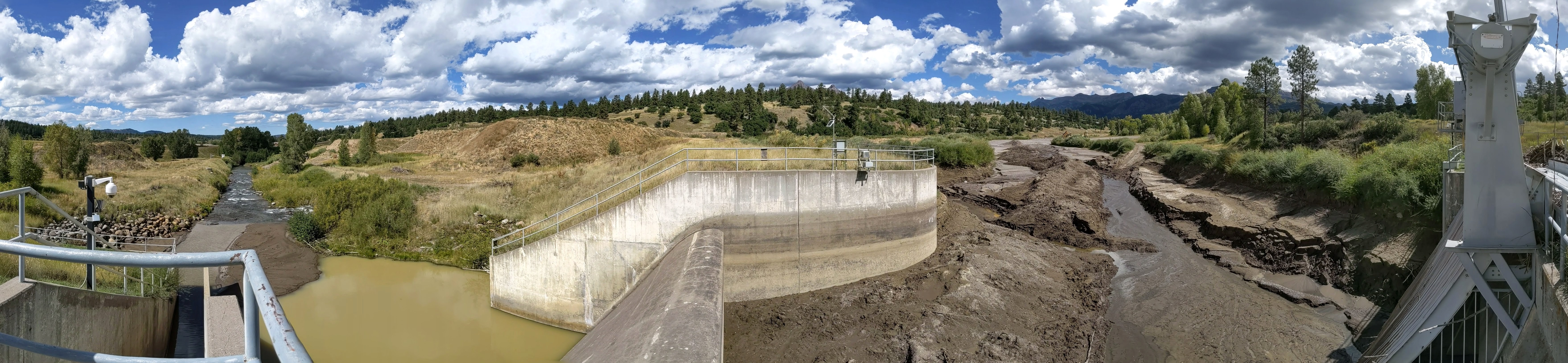
Oso Diversion Dam
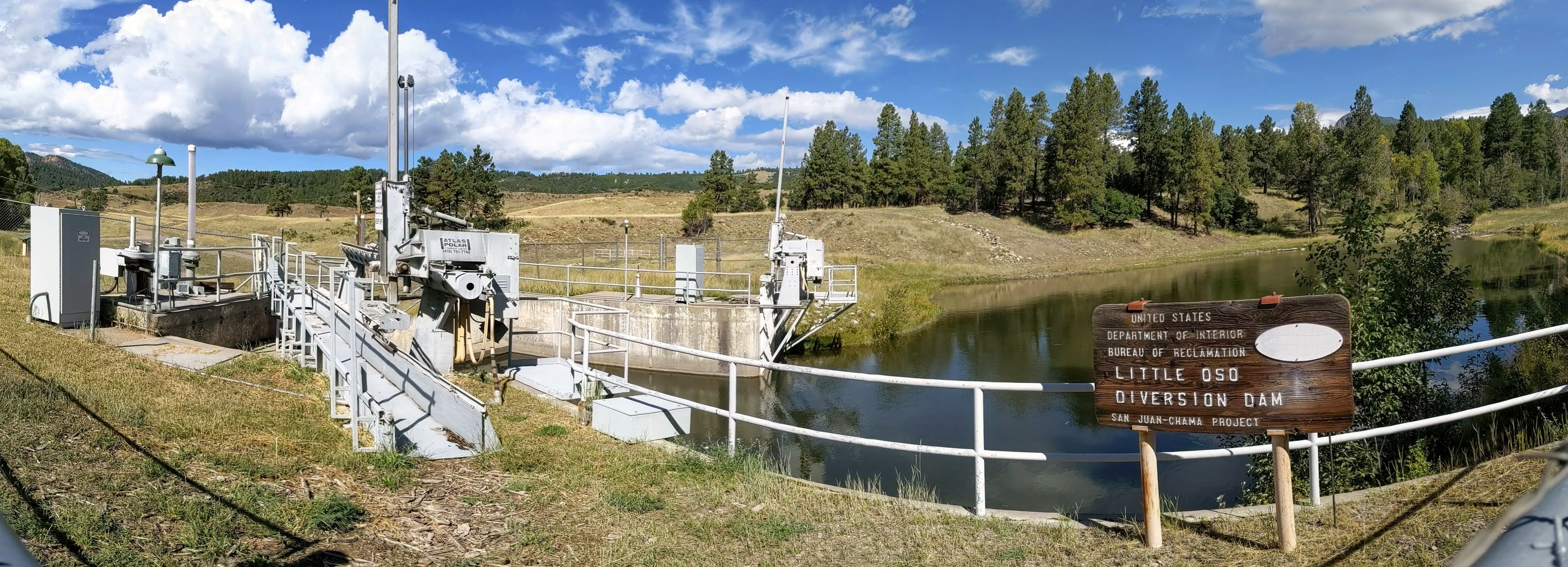
Little Oso Diversion Dam
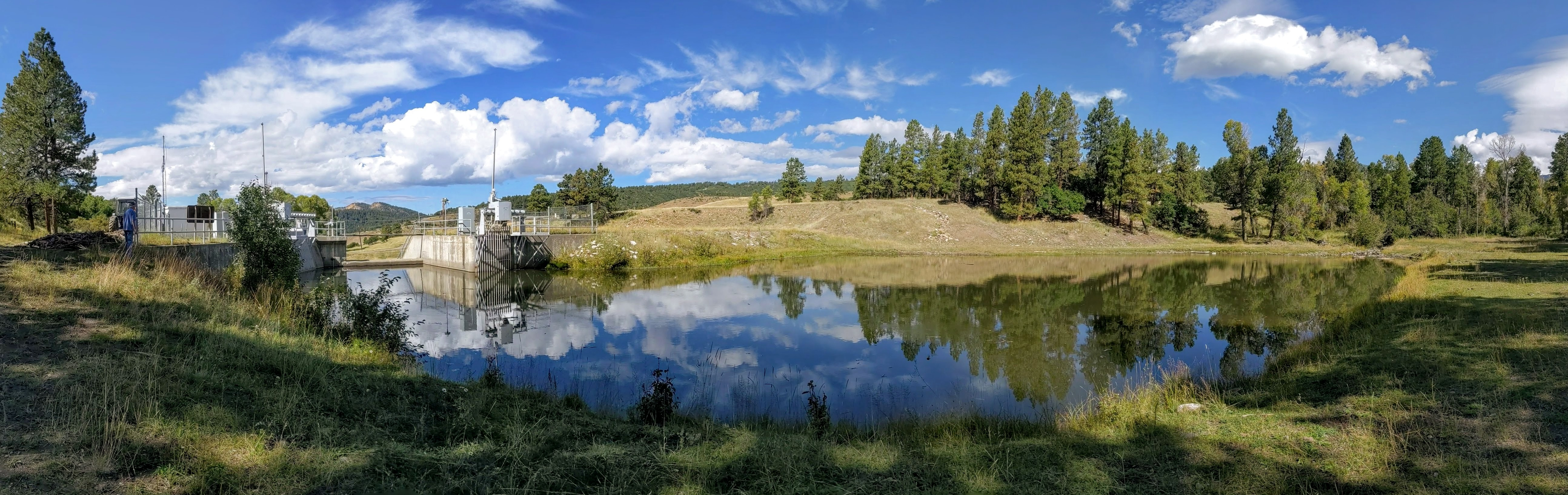
The small lake behind Little Oso Diversion Dam

== See also ==
- Colorado River Storage Project
- Rio Grande Project
- Rio Grande dams and diversions
