= Archuleta County, Colorado =

County in Colorado, United States

- County
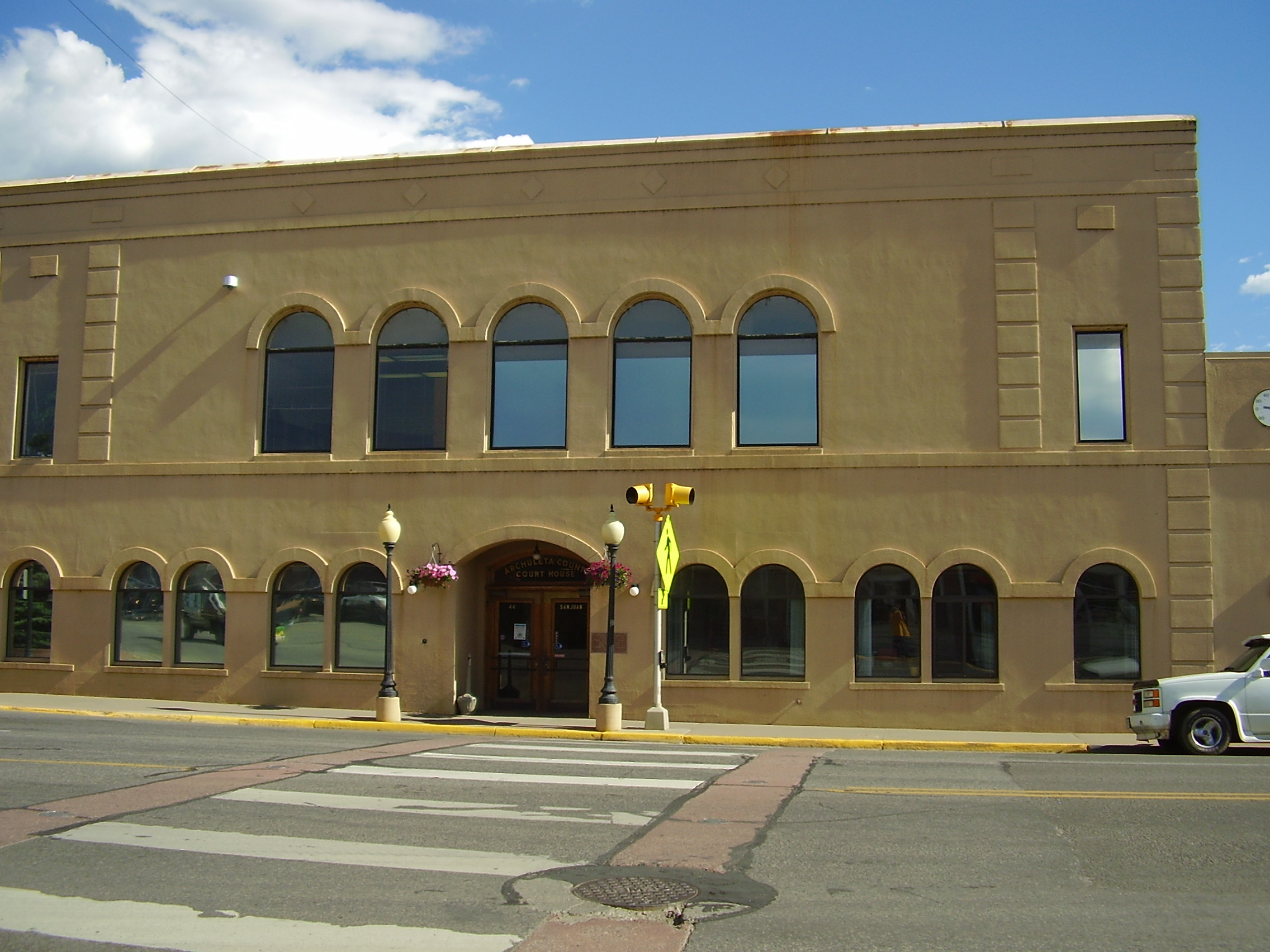
- Archuleta County Courthouse

- Location within the U.S. state of Colorado
- Coordinates: 37.19°N 107.05°W
- Country: United States
- State: Colorado
- Founded: April 14, 1885
- Named for: Antonio D. Archuleta
- Seat: Pagosa Springs
- Largest town: Pagosa Springs

Area
  - Total: 1,356 sq mi (3,510 km^{2})
  - Land: 1,350 sq mi (3,500 km^{2})
  - Water: 5.3 sq mi (14 km^{2}) 0.4%

Population (2020)
  - Total: 13,359
  - Estimate (2025): 14,306 ▲
  - Density: 9.9/sq mi (3.8/km^{2})
- Time zone: UTC−7 (Mountain)
  - Summer (DST): UTC−6 (MDT)
- Congressional district: 3rd
- Website: www.archuletacounty.gov

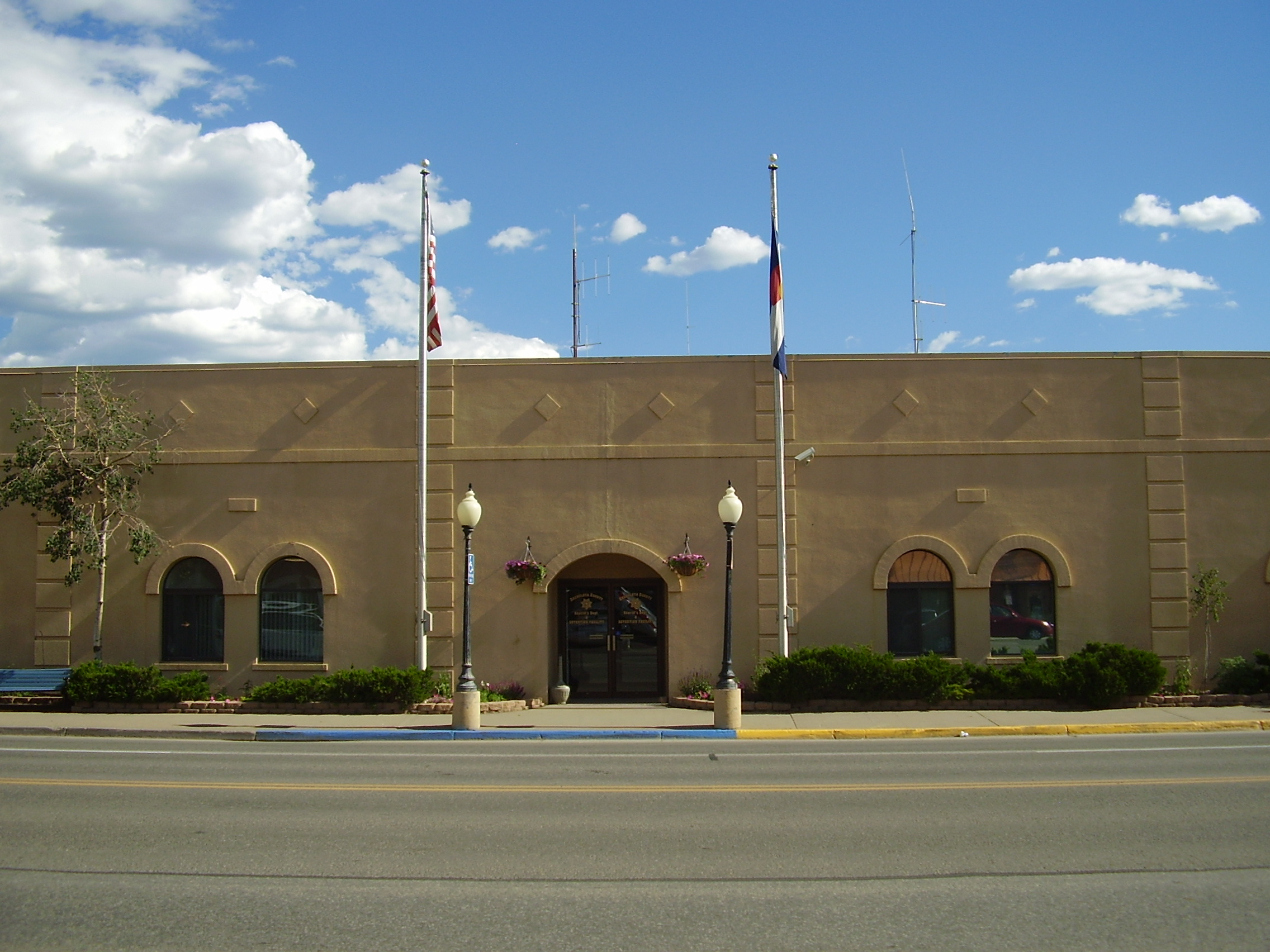
Archuleta County Sheriff's Department and Detention Facility in Pagosa Springs

Archuleta County is a county located in the U.S. state of Colorado. As of the 2020 census, the population was 13,359. The county seat and the only incorporated municipality in the county is Pagosa Springs.

== History ==
Archuleta County was created by the Colorado legislature on April 14, 1885, out of western Conejos County. It was named for Jose Manuel Archuleta, "head of one of the old Spanish families of New Mexico", and in honor of his son Antonio D. Archuleta, who was the Senator from Conejos County at the time.

== Geography ==
According to the U.S. Census Bureau, the county has a total area of 1,356 square miles (3,510 km^{2}), of which 1,350 square miles (3,500 km^{2}) is land and 5.3 square miles (14 km^{2}) (0.4%) is water.

=== Adjacent counties ===
- Mineral County, Colorado - north
- Rio Grande County, Colorado - northeast
- Conejos County, Colorado - east
- Rio Arriba County, New Mexico - south
- San Juan County, New Mexico - southwest
- La Plata County, Colorado - west
- Hinsdale County, Colorado - northwest

=== Airport ===
- Stevens Field

=== Major highways ===
- U.S. Highway 84
- U.S. Highway 160
- State Highway 17
- State Highway 151

=== National protected areas ===
- Rio Grande National Forest
- San Juan National Forest
- Chimney Rock National Monument
- South San Juan Wilderness

=== State protected area ===
- Navajo State Park

=== Scenic and historic trails ===
- Continental Divide National Scenic Trail
- Old Spanish National Historic Trail

=== Waterways ===
- Chamita River
- Dutton Creek
- Little Navajo River
- Martinez Creek
- McCabe Creek
- Mill Creek
- Piedra River
- Rio Blanco
- Rio Chama
- San Juan River
- Stollsteimer Creek
- Williams Creek

== Demographics ==
Historical population
Census	Pop.	Note	%±
1890	826		—
1900	2,117		156.3%
1910	3,302		56.0%
1920	3,590		8.7%
1930	3,204		−10.8%
1940	3,806		18.8%
1950	3,030		−20.4%
1960	2,629		−13.2%
1970	2,733		4.0%
1980	3,664		34.1%
1990	5,345		45.9%
2000	9,898		85.2%
2010	12,084		22.1%
2020	13,359		10.6%
2025 (est.)	14,306	▲	7.1%
U.S. Decennial Census; 1790-1960 1900-1990; 1990-2000

=== 2020 census ===
As of the 2020 census, the county had a population of 13,359, 5,792 households, and 9,495 housing units, and 42.2% of residents lived in urban areas while 57.8% lived in rural areas.

Of the residents, 18.0% were under the age of 18 and 28.3% were 65 years of age or older; the median age was 52.2 years. For every 100 females there were 101.3 males, and for every 100 females age 18 and over there were 100.3 males.

Archuleta County, Colorado – Racial and ethnic composition Note: the US Census treats Hispanic/Latino as an ethnic category. This table excludes Latinos from the racial categories and assigns them to a separate category. Hispanics/Latinos may be of any race.
Race / Ethnicity (NH = Non-Hispanic)	Pop 2000	Pop 2010	Pop 2020	% 2000	% 2010	% 2020
White alone (NH)	7,927	9,446	10,175	80.09%	78.17%	76.17%
Black or African American alone (NH)	31	33	41	0.31%	0.27%	0.31%
Native American or Alaska Native alone (NH)	101	166	170	1.02%	1.37%	1.27%
Asian alone (NH)	31	79	101	0.31%	0.65%	0.76%
Pacific Islander alone (NH)	2	4	6	0.02%	0.03%	0.04%
Other race alone (NH)	19	21	77	0.19%	0.17%	0.58%
Mixed race or Multiracial (NH)	128	187	630	1.29%	1.55%	4.72%
Hispanic or Latino (any race)	1,659	2,148	2,159	16.76%	17.78%	16.16%
Total	9,898	12,084	13,359	100.00%	100.00%	100.00%

The racial makeup of the county was 80.5% White, 0.3% Black or African American, 1.8% American Indian and Alaska Native, 0.8% Asian, 0.0% Native Hawaiian and Pacific Islander, 4.6% from some other race, and 12.0% from two or more races. Hispanic or Latino residents of any race comprised 16.2% of the population.

There were 5,792 households in the county, of which 23.2% had children under the age of 18 living with them and 20.6% had a female householder with no spouse or partner present. About 25.8% of all households were made up of individuals and 13.3% had someone living alone who was 65 years of age or older.

There were 9,495 housing units, of which 39.0% were vacant. Among occupied housing units, 78.6% were owner-occupied and 21.4% were renter-occupied. The homeowner vacancy rate was 3.3% and the rental vacancy rate was 17.4%.

=== American Community Survey ===
According to the U.S. Census Bureau QuickFacts for the county, the average household size was 2.34 persons, the median household income (in 2020 dollars) was $55,658, the per capita income was $32,995, and about 9.40% of the population were at or below the poverty line.

== Politics ==
As of January 2022, Archuleta County had approximately 10,696 active registered voters. There were 40.6% unaffiliated with a party, 38.3% Republican, 19.6% Democrat, .8% Libertarian, .2% Green, and .5% various other parties.

Voting in the county tends to favor conservative choices, especially at the state and national level, but winning elections for unaffiliated local candidates are not uncommon.

Archuleta County Commissioner elections, 2010-2022
	Republican	Democrat	Unaffiliated
2022, District 3	62.30%		37.70%
2020, District 1	50.30%		49.70%
2020, District 2	52.00%		48.00%
2018, District 3	97.20%	2.80%	
2016, District 1	48.50%	21.80%	29.70%
2016, District 2	56.40%	20.70%	22.90%
2014, District 3	46.90%		53.10%
2012, District 1	85.70%		14.30%
2012, District 2		61.90%	38.10%
2010, District 3	42.50%		57.50%

United States presidential election results for Archuleta County, Colorado
Year	Republican		Democratic		Third party(ies)	
Year	No.	%	No.	%	No.	%
1888	127	62.25%	77	37.75%	0	0.00%
1892	107	47.98%	0	0.00%	116	52.02%
1896	141	26.26%	393	73.18%	3	0.56%
1900	578	59.40%	391	40.18%	4	0.41%
1904	674	63.71%	357	33.74%	27	2.55%
1908	503	46.06%	505	46.25%	84	7.69%
1912	452	28.88%	609	38.91%	504	32.20%
1916	473	35.70%	830	62.64%	22	1.66%
1920	700	63.12%	379	34.17%	30	2.71%
1924	451	43.12%	269	25.72%	326	31.17%
1928	610	56.48%	447	41.39%	23	2.13%
1932	462	32.77%	928	65.82%	20	1.42%
1936	541	40.59%	761	57.09%	31	2.33%
1940	869	53.71%	744	45.98%	5	0.31%
1944	602	58.45%	427	41.46%	1	0.10%
1948	597	55.07%	479	44.19%	8	0.74%
1952	691	64.58%	377	35.23%	2	0.19%
1956	635	59.91%	423	39.91%	2	0.19%
1960	489	46.26%	567	53.64%	1	0.09%
1964	370	36.71%	632	62.70%	6	0.60%
1968	486	49.69%	409	41.82%	83	8.49%
1972	606	64.47%	300	31.91%	34	3.62%
1976	768	53.63%	632	44.13%	32	2.23%
1980	1,252	65.89%	532	28.00%	116	6.11%
1984	1,557	71.98%	584	27.00%	22	1.02%
1988	1,440	63.66%	795	35.15%	27	1.19%
1992	1,242	44.11%	819	29.08%	755	26.81%
1996	1,963	57.11%	997	29.01%	477	13.88%
2000	2,988	62.80%	1,432	30.10%	338	7.10%
2004	3,601	61.67%	2,141	36.67%	97	1.66%
2008	3,638	54.91%	2,836	42.81%	151	2.28%
2012	3,872	57.50%	2,679	39.78%	183	2.72%
2016	4,264	58.10%	2,500	34.06%	575	7.83%
2020	5,189	56.75%	3,738	40.88%	217	2.37%
2024	5,218	55.77%	3,904	41.72%	235	2.51%

United States Senate election results for Archuleta County, Colorado2
Year	Republican		Democratic		Third party(ies)	
Year	No.	%	No.	%	No.	%
2020	5,225	57.93%	3,591	39.82%	203	2.25%

United States Senate election results for Archuleta County, Colorado3
Year	Republican		Democratic		Third party(ies)	
Year	No.	%	No.	%	No.	%
2022	4,099	52.42%	3,428	43.84%	293	3.75%

Colorado Gubernatorial election results for Archuleta County
Year	Republican		Democratic		Third party(ies)	
Year	No.	%	No.	%	No.	%
2022	3,961	50.72%	3,641	46.62%	208	2.66%

== Communities ==
=== Town ===
- Pagosa Springs

=== Census-designated place ===
- Arboles

=== Other unincorporated places ===
- Chimney Rock
- Chromo
- Juanita
- Dyke
  - Apparently named for the first county sheriff (circa 1890) and later county commissioner, Wm. Dyke. It can be found listed on USGS and FAA maps.

== Education ==
School districts include:

- Archuleta County School District 50-JT
- Bayfield School District 10 JT-R
- Ignacio School District 11-JT

== See also ==
- Bibliography of Colorado
- Geography of Colorado
- History of Colorado
  - National Register of Historic Places listings in Archuleta County, Colorado
- Index of Colorado-related articles
- List of Colorado-related lists
  - List of counties in Colorado
- Outline of Colorado
