= Chromo, Colorado =

Unincorporated community in Archuleta County, CO, USA

- Unincorporated community
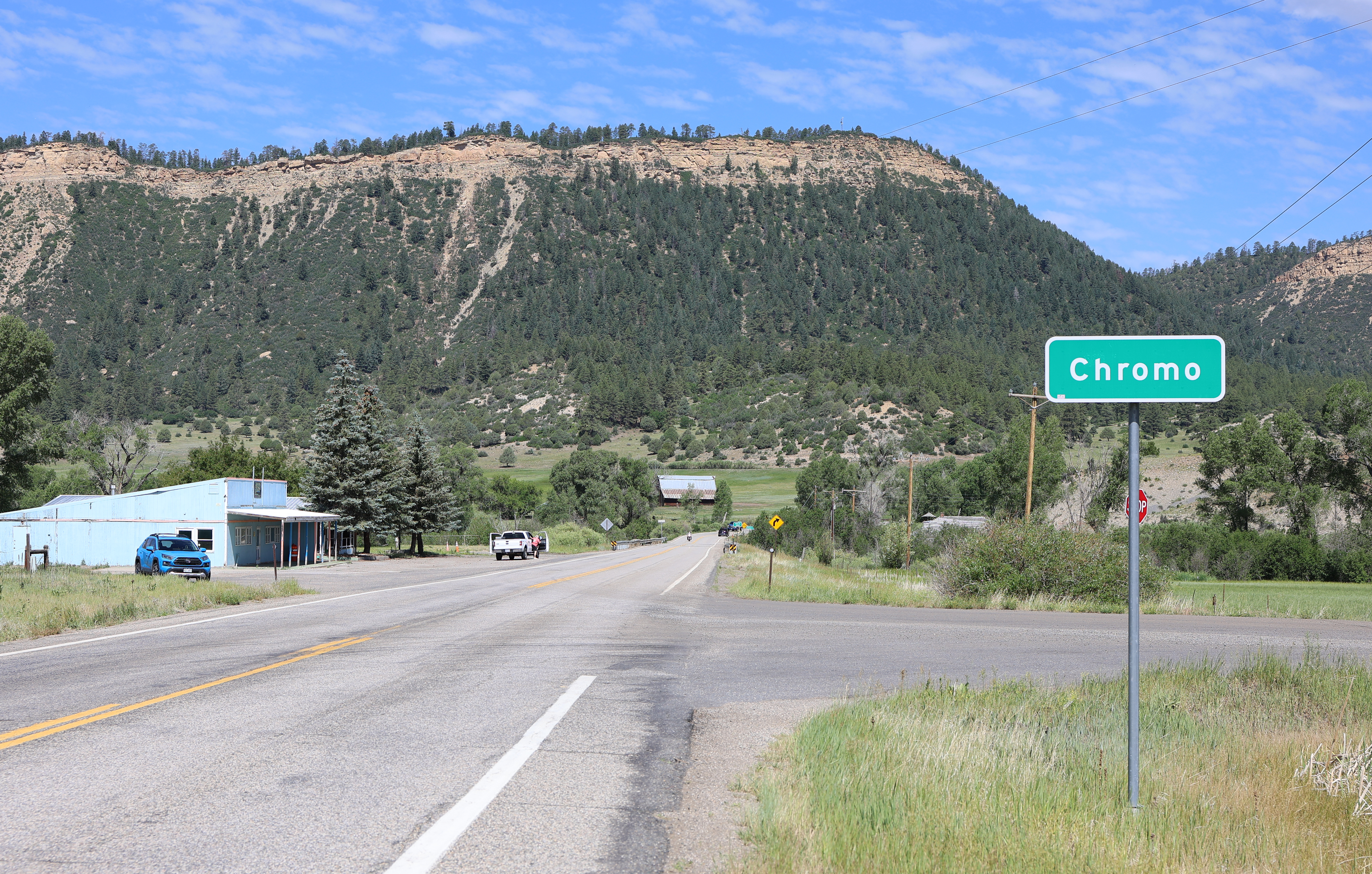
- Entering Chromo from the south on U.S. Route 84.

- Location of Chromo, Colorado. Chromo (Colorado)
- Coordinates: 37°02′11″N 106°50′36″W
- Country: United States
- State: Colorado
- County: Archuleta

Government
  - Type: Unincorporated community
  - Body: Archuleta County
- Elevation: 7,284 ft (2,220 m)
- Time zone: UTC−07:00 (MST)
  - Summer (DST): UTC−06:00 (MDT)
- ZIP code: 81128
- Area code: 719
- GNIS place ID: 191038

Chromo is an unincorporated community and U.S. Post Office in Archuleta County, Colorado, United States. The Chromo Post Office has the ZIP Code 81128.

The community takes its name from nearby Chromo Mountain.

== History ==
Historically, the Ute people lived in the Chromo area. The Chromo, Colorado, post office opened on October 30, 1885. In 1922 the Chromo School was built to serve the children in the area and operated from 1922 to 1954. The original school building, a concrete structure, now functions as a community center. The well-preserved building is an example of a rural school complex, containing a teacherage and an outhouse.

== Geography ==
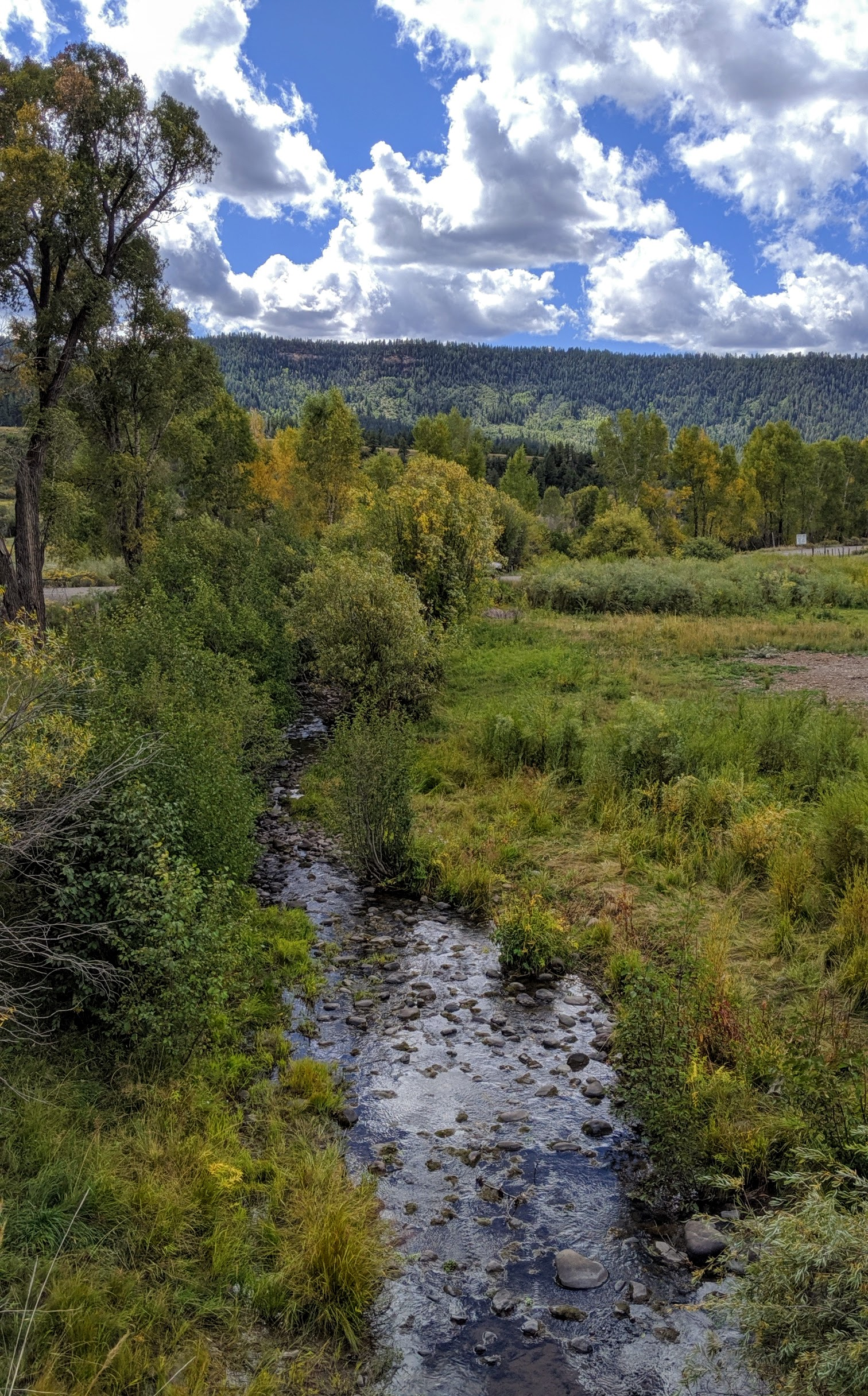
The Little Navajo River from US Route 84, near its confluence with the Navajo River, in Chromo.

The Little Navajo River and Navajo River flow through the community.

=== Climate ===
This climatic region is typified by large seasonal temperature differences, with warm to hot (and often humid) summers and cold (sometimes severely cold) winters. According to the Köppen Climate Classification system, Chromo has a humid continental climate, abbreviated "Dfb" on climate maps.

== Education ==
The Archuleta County School District serves Chromo.

== See also ==
- List of populated places in Colorado
