= Navajo River =

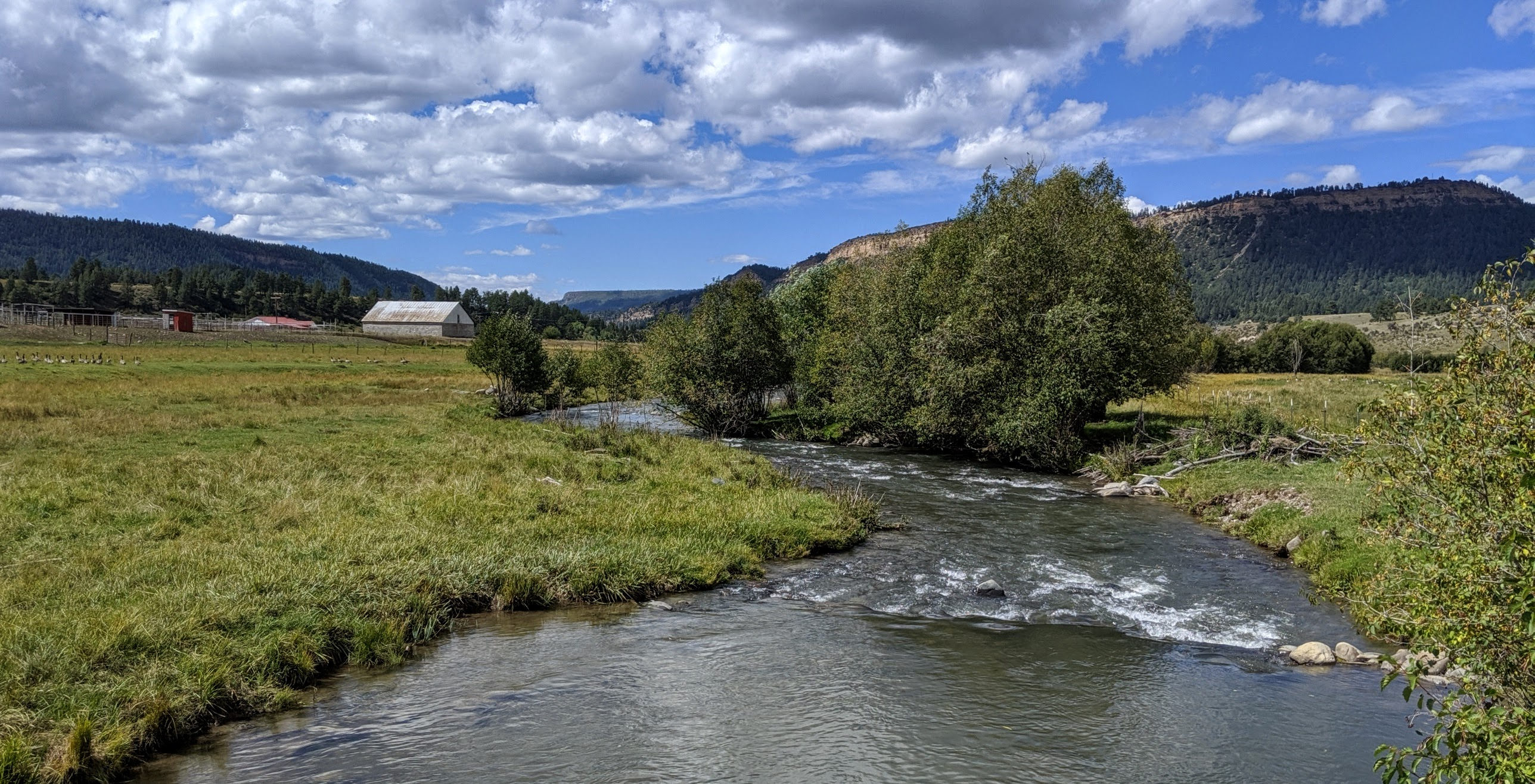
- Native name: Lóolahó (Jicarilla Apache)

Physical characteristics
- Source
  - coordinates: 37°15′12″N 106°38′43″W
- Mouth
  - location: Confluence with San Juan
  - coordinates: 37°01′26″N 107°09′31″W
  - elevation: 6,319 ft (1,926 m)

Basin features
- Progression: San Juan—Colorado

Navajo River (Jicarilla Apache: Lóolahó) is a 54-mile-long (87 km) tributary of the San Juan River. It flows from a source in the South San Juan Wilderness of Conejos County, Colorado southwest past Chromo, Colorado. The river dips into New Mexico, passing just north of Dulce before heading northwest to a confluence with the San Juan in Archuleta County, Colorado. A large portion of its water is diverted across the Continental Divide to the Rio Grande basin as part of the San Juan–Chama Project.

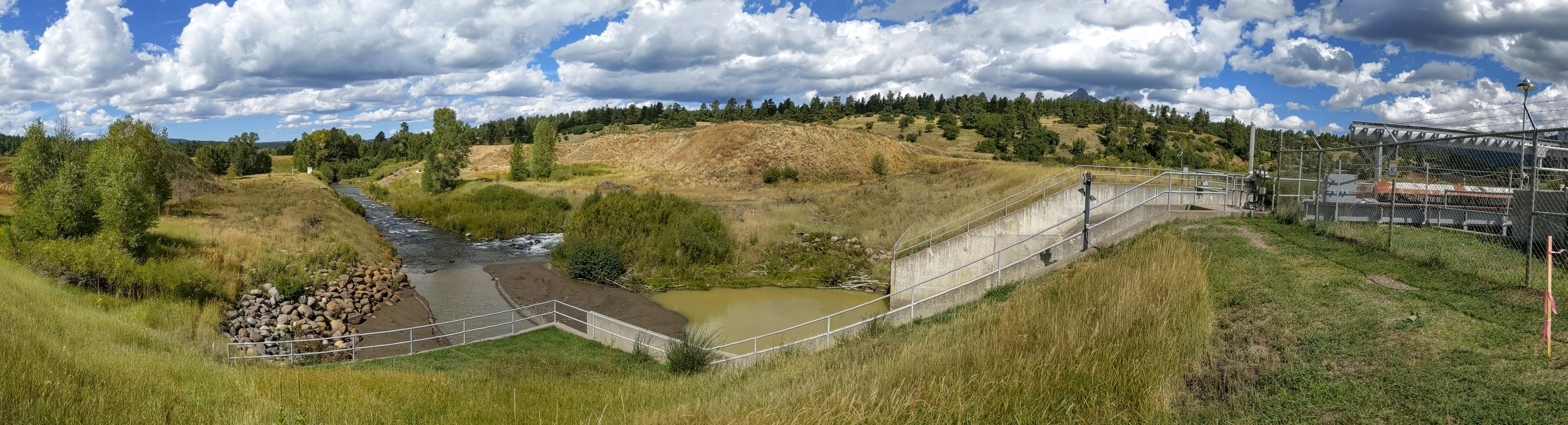
Navajo River at outflow of Oso Diversion Dam

== See also ==
- List of rivers of Colorado
- List of rivers of New Mexico
- List of tributaries of the Colorado River
