= Antonio D. Archuleta =

American politician

José Antonio Donaciano Archuleta (1855 – c. March 1918) was a member of the Colorado Senate and the namesake of Archuleta County; he was influential in its formation.

== Biography ==
Archuleta was born in 1855 in Taos, New Mexico Territory, to José Manuel Archuleta; he moved to Colorado Territory shortly after his birth. He was descended from "one of the old Spanish families of New Mexico". In 1876, he was elected as a Republican to the Colorado House of Representatives from Conejos County and to the Colorado Senate in 1883, serving until 1887. Archuleta introduced legislation in 1885 for the formation of Archuleta County; he moved there in 1887 following the completion of his term and became a rancher. Archuleta County was named in honor his father, Hon. José Manuel de Jesus Archuleta and family.

Archuleta was described as a "friend and supporter of the McKinley administration." He was a member of the Woodmen of the World fraternal organization.

Archuleta married Lauriana (or Lauranna) Gallegos in 1877; she died in 1920. They had one son, Daniel Ross Archuleta. Archuleta was killed in 1918 near Pilares de Nacozari, Nacozari de García Municipality, Sonora, Mexico.

On or about March 21, 1918, the claimant, then residing at Pagosa Springs, Colorado, received a telegram dated March 21, 1918, which was sent to him from Douglas, Arizona, informing him that his father had been murdered near his mine in Mexico, and that the body had been found on March 16, 1918, in a decomposed condition.
Some days after the murder of the claimant's father when the body was discovered, the authorities at Pilares de Nacozari visited the house of the deceased and there made a perfunctory investigation of the murder, ascertaining that the contents of the house were in a disturbed condition, which led to the conclusion that robbery had been the motive of the murder. It appeared that the murder occurred in the house, from which the body was dragged about 75 feet into a tunnel several hundred feet distant from the house, where it was found. Although the authorities arrested several persons suspected of the murder, including a young man about twenty years of age, they failed to continue a conscientious investigation of the murder, placed the "suspected criminals" at large, and did nothing to clear up the crime with a view to apprehending and punishing the murderers.

— Daniel R. Archuleta (U.S.A.) v. United Mexican States,
