= Rio Blanco (Colorado) =

Stream in southern Colorado

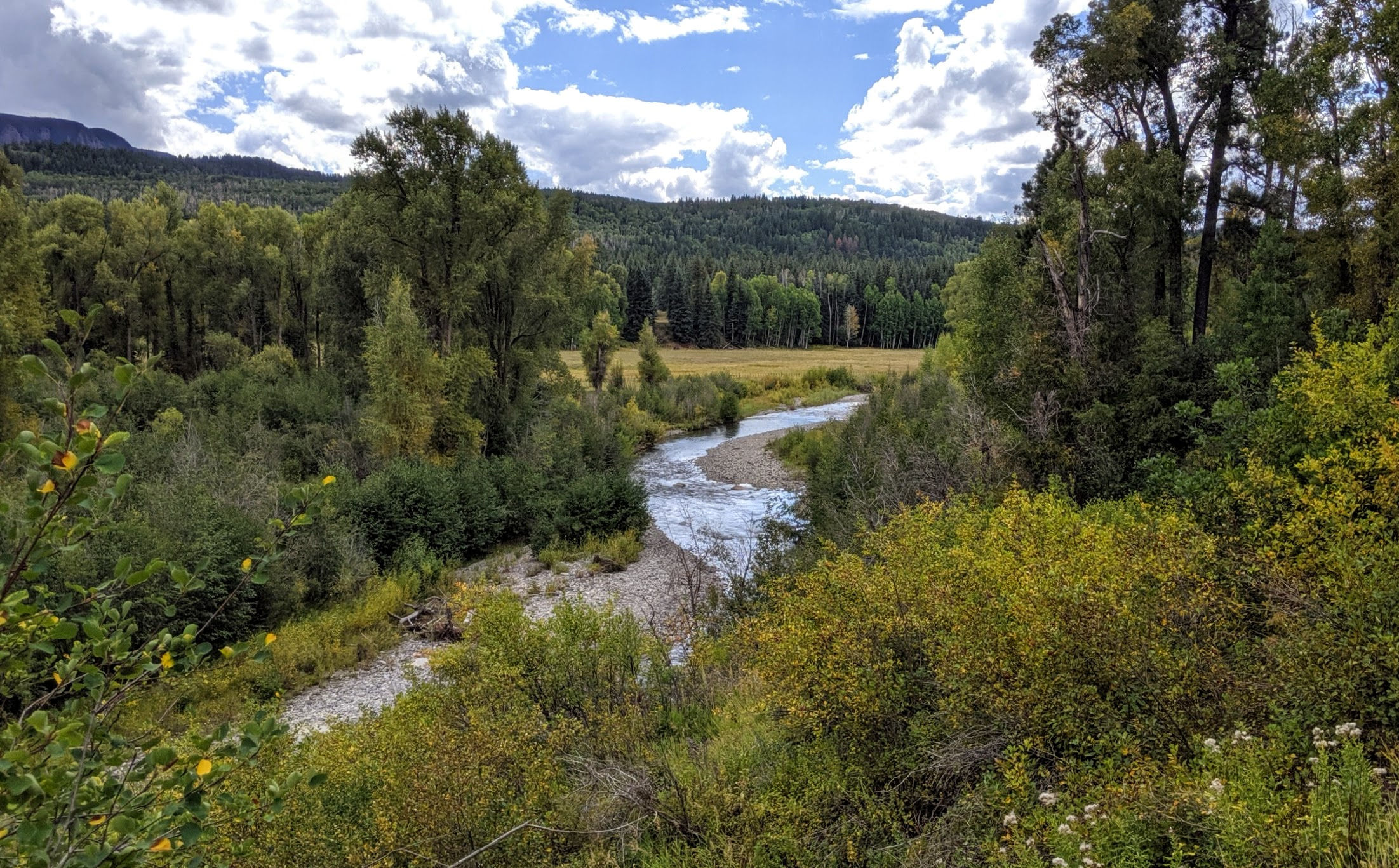

Physical characteristics
- Source
  - location: Conejos County, Colorado; United States
  - coordinates: 37°18′43″N 106°40′06″W
- Mouth
  - location: Confluence with San Juan
  - coordinates: 37°07′16″N 107°02′37″W
  - elevation: 6,608 ft (2,014 m)

Basin features
- Progression: San Juan—Colorado
- Tributaries
  - left: Benson Creek, Rio Blanco
  - right: Summit Creek, Hondo Creek, Oil Creek, Squaretop Creek

Rio Blanco, also called the Blanco River, is a stream that is a tributary of the San Juan River in southern Colorado, United States. The stream originates in the San Juan Mountains and flows for 30 miles (48 km) through the San Juan National Forest and private lands to its confluence with the San Juan River in Archuleta County, Colorado. Colorado classifies the Rio Blanco as an Aquatic Life Coldwater Class 1/Recreation Class 1 waterway supporting water supply and agricultural uses. The river also features native cutthroat trout and introduced rainbow trout fishing.

== Restoration project ==
The San Juan–Chama Diversion Project, which was started in 1971, diverted water from the river at the Blanco Diversion Dam and eventually led to reduced water flow and a loss of aquatic habitat in the Rio Blanco. In 1998, Colorado included a 12-mile reach of the lower Rio Blanco on its list of impaired waters for failure to support its aquatic life due to sediment. A grass roots project organized by the residents aided by numerous local statewide and federal agencies to restore the stream channel to match the altered flow regime, resulted in the river's physical and biological function and water quality being improved. In 2008, Colorado removed the Rio Blanco, including the 12-miles of the lower reach, from the state's list of impaired waters.

== Fishing ==
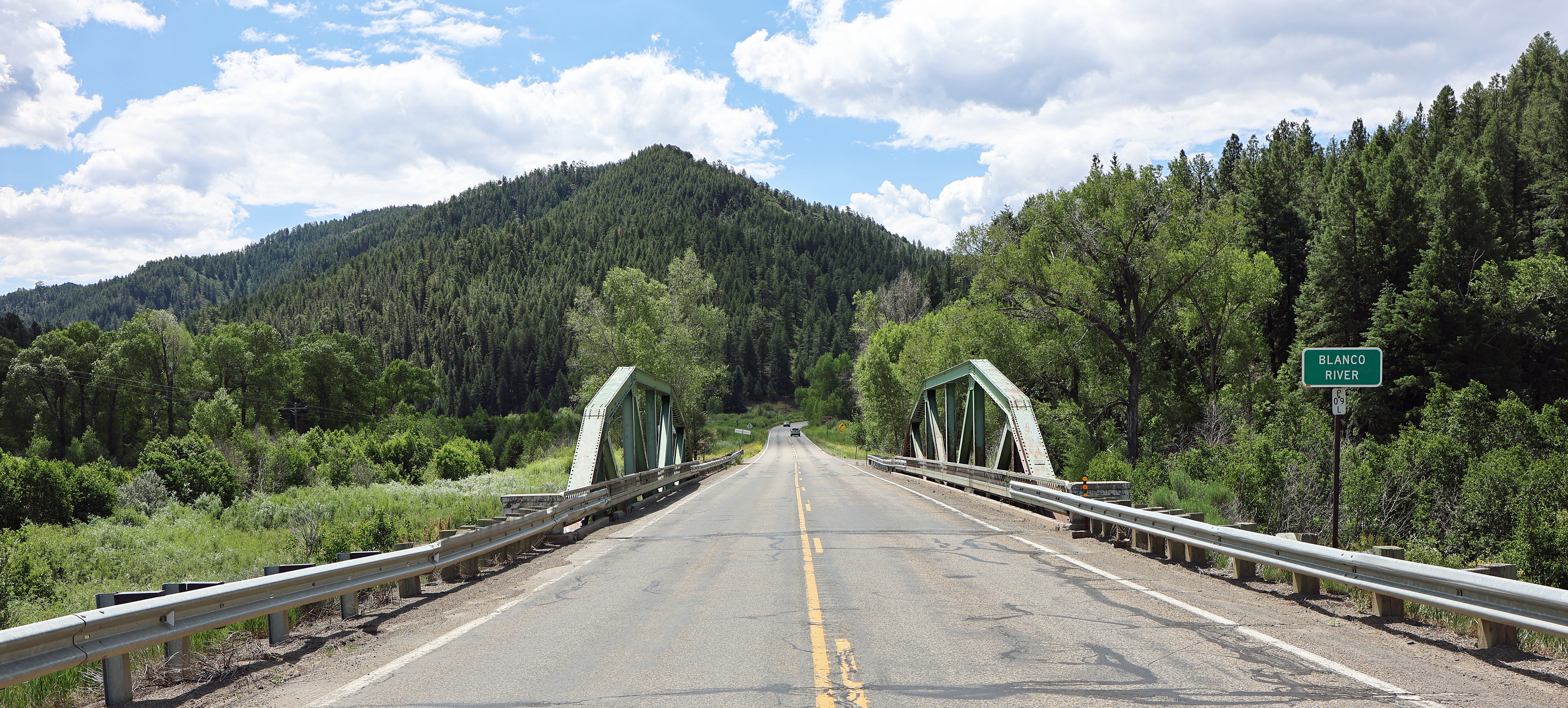
The bridge over the river at Highway 84.

Parts of the river range from 10 to 20 feet (3.0 to 6.1 m) wide, and fishing is permitted along the side creeks including Rio Blanco. Most of the trout are in the 7-to-12-inch (180 to 300 mm) range.

There are 3 miles (4.8 km) of the river that were transformed by hydrologist Dave Rosgen, from being wide and shallow to a deep flow that now supports a variety of trout. Rosgen's plan included placing boulders and old trees on the river banks to direct the waters toward a channel that would be more defined. He also constructed a tube to divert away the gravel and sand, which allows water to flow through, but the sediment is routed to a holding area which is regularly emptied and used elsewhere. Cost of the renovation was about $1 million. The three-mile stretch may be fished by guests of El Rancho Pinoso, a privately owned ranch near the river.

== See also ==
- List of rivers of Colorado
- Stream restoration
- Restoration ecology
