= Texas State Highway 67 =

State highway in Texas

State Highway 67

Route information
- Maintained by TxDOT
- Length: 30.77 mi (49.52 km)
- Existed: 1923–present

Major junctions
- South end: US 180 near Breckenridge
- North end: US 380 / SH 16 in Graham

Location
- Country: United States
- State: Texas
- Counties: Stephens, Young

Highway system
- Highways in Texas; Interstate; US; State; Former; Toll; Loops; Spurs; FM/RM; Park; Rec
← US 67	→ SH 68

State Highway 67 (SH 67) is a Texas state highway that runs between Breckenridge and Graham.

== History ==

The route was originally designated on August 21, 1923, along renumbered portions of SH 22, SH 18, and SH 2 extending from Graham to Breckenridge, then southeast from Breckenridge, reaching the southern end of Waco. On July 31, 1929, SH 67 was to be rerouted away from Carlton and through Clairette and Alexander instead if bonds were voted. On December 17, 1929, it was rerouted away from Carlton and through Clairette and Alexander instead. On September 26, 1945, the section from Breckenridge to Waco was transferred to SH 6. Part became U.S. Highway 183 (US 183) and SH 69 (later SH 112). On May 6, 1974, SH 67 was relocated in Graham over a new route and a portion of FM 61. SH 67A was a spur which was designated on April 27, 1925, from SH 67 in Breckenridge to Woodson. It was extended on January 16, 1928, to Throckmorton. On March 19, 1930, this was renumbered as SH 157 (later SH 6, now US 183).

== Major intersections ==
County	Location	mi	km	Destinations	Notes
Stephens		0.0	0.0	US 180 / CR 227 – Palo Pinto, Breckenridge	Southern terminus
Stephens		3.6	5.8	FM 1800 west	Eastern terminus of FM 1800
Stephens		7.2	11.6	FM 701 north – Eliasville	Southern terminus of FM 701
Stephens		10.6	17.1	FM 717 south	Northern terminus of FM 717
Stephens		11.2	18.0	FM 1148 east – Possum Kingdom Lake	Western terminus of FM 1148
Young	South Bend	21.3	34.3	FM 701 south – Eliasville	Northern terminus of FM 701
Young		29.1	46.8	FM 209 west – Woodson	Eastern terminus of FM 209
Young	Graham	30.4	48.9	FM 61 north – Fort Belknap	Southern terminus of FM 61
Young	Graham	30.7	49.4	US 380 / SH 16 (Elm Street) – Young County Arena, Throckmorton	Northern terminus
1.000 mi = 1.609 km; 1.000 km = 0.621 mi
