= National Register of Historic Places listings in Young County, Texas =

Location of Young County in Texas

This is a list of the National Register of Historic Places listings in Young County, Texas.

This is intended to be a complete list of properties listed on the National Register of Historic Places in Young County, Texas. There are five properties listed on the National Register in the county. These include two National Historic Landmarks one of which is also a Recorded Texas Historic Landmark (RTHL) while containing an additional RTHL. One additional property is also an RTHL.

This National Park Service list is complete through NPS recent listings posted September 26, 2025.

== Current listings ==
The publicly disclosed locations of National Register properties may be seen in a mapping service provided.

| | Name on the Register | Image | Date listed | Location | City or town | Description |
|---|---|---|---|---|---|---|
| 1 | Fort Belknap | Fort Belknap | October 15, 1966 (#66000824) | 1 mi (1.6 km). S of jct. of TX 24 and 251; 33°09′03″N 98°44′29″W | Newcastle vicinity | Recorded Texas Historic Landmark, contains additional Recorded Texas Historic Landmark |
| 2 | Graham Post Office | Graham Post Office | June 25, 1999 (#99000724) | 510 Third St. 33°06′20″N 98°35′27″W | Graham | Recorded Texas Historic Landmark; now used as the Old Post Office Museum & Art Center. |
| 3 | Harrell Site | | October 15, 1966 (#66000825) | Address Restricted | South Bend | |
| 4 | National Theater | National Theater | June 24, 1993 (#93000565) | 522 Oak St. 33°06′22″N 98°35′30″W | Graham | |
| 5 | Spencer Boyd Street Houses | Spencer Boyd Street Houses | August 16, 1984 (#84002005) | 800 and 804 3rd St. 33°06′20″N 98°35′09″W | Graham | |
| 6 | State Highway 120 Bridge at the Brazos River | State Highway 120 Bridge at the Brazos River | February 22, 2018 (#100002132) | Hardin Ln. at the Brazos R. 33°10′30″N 98°45′22″W | Newcastle vicinity | |

== See also ==
- National Register of Historic Places listings in Texas
- List of National Historic Landmarks in Texas
- Recorded Texas Historic Landmarks in Young County
