= Tackett Mountain =

Tackett Mountain may refer to:

- Tackett Mountain (Texas) is a summit near Graham, Texas, USA
- Tackett Mountain (Arkansas) is a summit in the Ozarks, Arkansas, USA

== See also ==
- Tackitt (disambiguation)
