= Pres Johnston =

American football player (1920–1979)

No. 72, 84
- Positions: Fullback, Halfback, Linebacker

Personal information
- Born: October 12, 1920; Newcastle, Texas, U.S.
- Died: January 15, 1979 (aged 58); Lubbock, Texas, U.S.
- Listed height: 6 ft 0 in (1.83 m)
- Listed weight: 205 lb (93 kg)

Career information
- High school: Newcastle
- College: SMU (1938–1941)
- NFL draft: 1942: 7th round, 59th overall pick

Career history
- Miami Seahawks (1946); Buffalo Bisons (1946)

Awards and highlights
- 2× First-team All-SWC (1940, 1941); Second-team All-SWC (1939)

Career AAFC statistics
- Rushing yards: 218
- Rushing average: 4.8
- Receptions: 6
- Receiving yards: 54
- Total touchdowns: 3
- Stats at Pro Football Reference

Luther Preston Johnston (October 12, 1920 – January 15, 1979) was an American professional football fullback.

Johnston was born in Newcastle, Texas, in 1920 and attended Newcastle High School in that city. He played college football at SMU.

He played professional football for the Miami Seahawks and Buffalo Bisons of the All-America Football Conference (AAFC) in 1946. He appeared in 11 games, seven of them as a starter. He rushed for 218 yards and two touchdowns on 45 carries.

He died in 1979 in Lubbock, Texas.
