= National Register of Historic Places listings in Starr County, Texas =

Location of Starr County in Texas

This is a list of National Register of Historic Places listings in Starr County, Texas.

This is intended to be a complete list of properties and districts listed on the National Register of Historic Places in Starr County, Texas. There are three districts, including one National Historic Landmark (NHL) district, and six individual properties listed on the National Register in the county. All of the districts contain several Recorded Texas Historic Landmarks while the NHL district also holds State Antiquities Landmarks including one that is individually listed on the National Register.

This National Park Service list is complete through NPS recent listings posted May 1, 2026.

== Current listings ==
The locations of National Register properties and districts may be seen in a mapping service provided.

	Name on the Register	Image	Date listed	Location	City or town	Description
1	Silverio de la Pena Drugstore and Post Office	Silverio de la Pena Drugstore and Post Office	September 2, 1980 (#80004150)	423 E. Main St. 26°22′39″N 98°49′00″W	Rio Grande City	Part of Rio Grande City Downtown Historic District
2	Fort Ringgold Historic District	Fort Ringgold Historic District	March 26, 1993 (#93000196)	Rio Grande City School grounds, 1/4 mi. SE of jct. of US 83 and TX 755; 26°22′25″N 98°48′26″W	Rio Grande City	Includes Recorded Texas Historic Landmarks
3	Fred and Nell Kain Guerra House		December 6, 2005 (#05001400)	800 Blk. W Main; 26°22′54″N 98°49′45″W	Rio Grande City	
4	LaBorde House, Store and Hotel	LaBorde House, Store and Hotel	May 29, 1980 (#80004149)	601 E. Main St. 26°22′38″N 98°48′56″W	Rio Grande City	Part of Rio Grande City Downtown Historic District
5	Mifflin Kenedy Warehouse and Old Starr County Courthouse	Mifflin Kenedy Warehouse and Old Starr County Courthouse	July 8, 2005 (#05000657)	200 Blk. W. Water St. 26°22′49″N 98°49′21″W	Rio Grande City	
6	Rio Grande City Downtown Historic District	Rio Grande City Downtown Historic District	July 8, 2005 (#05000656)	Roughly bounded by N. Corpus, E. Wimpy, N. Avasolo and E. Mirasoles; 26°22′41″N 98°49′01″W	Rio Grande City	Includes Recorded Texas Historic Landmarks
7	Roma Historic District	Roma Historic District	July 31, 1972 (#72001371)	Properties along Estrella and Hidalgo Sts. between Garfield St. and Bravo Alley; 26°24′22″N 99°01′05″W	Roma	Includes State Antiquities Landmarks, Recorded Texas Historic Landmarks
8	Roma-San Pedro International Bridge		March 23, 1984 (#84001959)	SW of Hidalgo St. and Bravo Alley; 26°24′13″N 99°01′06″W	Roma-Los Saenz	Part of Roma Historic District; State Antiquities Landmark
9	Yzaquirre-Longoria House		December 22, 2005 (#05001462)	107 W. Water St. 26°22′44″N 98°49′23″W	Rio Grande City	

== See also ==
- National Register of Historic Places listings in Texas
- List of National Historic Landmarks in Texas
- Recorded Texas Historic Landmarks in Starr County
