= List of National Historic Landmarks in Texas =

Texas National Historic Landmarks (clickable map)
Counties with multiple landmarks
National Historic Landmarks
National Historic Landmark Districts
National Historical Parks
National Historic Site
National Historic Landmarks with restricted location (pinned to county, not actual site)

This is a List of National Historic Landmarks in Texas and other landmarks of equivalent landmark status in the state. The United States' National Historic Landmark (NHL) program is operated under the auspices of the National Park Service, and recognizes structures, districts, objects, and similar resources according to a list of criteria of national significance. There are 50 current and one former NHLs in Texas.

== Key ==
| | National Historic Landmark |
| ^{†} | National Historic Landmark District |
| ^{#} | National Historical Park |
| ^{§} | National Historic Site |
| ^{*} | Delisted Landmark |

== Current National Historic Landmarks in Texas ==
The landmarks in Texas are distributed across 29 of the 254 counties in the state. Nine of the sites are in Bexar County.

| (Note: Numbers represent an alphabetical ordering by significant words. Various colorings, defined here, differentiate National Historic Landmarks and historic districts from other NRHP buildings, structures, sites or objects.) | Landmark name | Image | Date designated (Note: The eight-digit number below each date is the number assigned to each location in the National Register Information System database, which can be viewed by clicking the number.) | Location | County | Description |
|---|---|---|---|---|---|---|
| 1 | Alamo | Alamo | December 19, 1960 (#66000808) | San Antonio; 29°25′34″N 98°29′10″W | Bexar | Former mission and fortress compound; now a museum; built by the Spanish Empire in the 18th century; later used as a fortress in the 19th century; scene of the 1836 Battle of the Alamo |
| 2 | Apollo Mission Control Center | Apollo Mission Control Center | October 3, 1985 (#85002815) | Houston; 29°33′23″N 95°05′18″W | Harris | NASA control center |
| 3^{†} | Bastrop State Park | Bastrop State Park | September 25, 1997 (#97001242) | Bastrop; 30°06′39″N 97°16′25″W | Bastrop | This park was designed in the 1930s as a showcase of Civilian Conservation Corps work. Its facilities were designed by CCC architect Herbert Maier. |
| 4^{†} | Dealey Plaza Historic District | Dealey Plaza Historic District | October 12, 1993 (#93001607) | Dallas; 32°46′43″N 96°48′30″W | Dallas | Site of President John F. Kennedy's assassination. |
| 5^{†} | East End Historic District | East End Historic District | May 11, 1976 (#75001979) | Galveston; 29°18′16″N 94°46′58″W | Galveston | Galveston's East End was where the city elite built a number of elaborate mansions. |
| 6 | ELISSA (Bark) | ELISSA (Bark) | December 14, 1990 (#78002930) | Galveston; 29°20′00″N 94°46′39″W | Galveston | Tall ship launched in 1877 |
| 7 | Espada Aqueduct | Espada Aqueduct | July 19, 1964 (#66000809) | San Antonio; 29°19′57″N 98°27′41″W | Bexar | Built by Franciscan friars in 1731 to supply irrigation water to the lands near Mission San Francisco de la Espada |
| 8^{†} | Fair Park Texas Centennial Buildings | Fair Park Texas Centennial Buildings | September 24, 1986 (#86003488) | Dallas; 32°46′55″N 96°45′56″W | Dallas | Surviving Art Deco buildings from the 1936 Texas Centennial Exposition. |
| 9 | Fort Belknap | Fort Belknap | December 19, 1960 (#66000824) | Newcastle; 33°09′03″N 98°44′28″W | Young | Key frontier post of the 1850s; now a museum. |
| 10^{†} | Fort Brown | Fort Brown | December 19, 1960 (#66000811) | Brownsville; 25°53′54″N 97°29′32″W | Cameron | Military post of the United States Army in Texas during the latter half of 19th century and the early part of the 20th century |
| 11^{†} | Fort Concho | Fort Concho | July 4, 1961 (#66000823) | San Angelo; 31°27′10″N 100°25′45″W | Tom Green | Established as U.S. Army post in 1867; deactivated 1889; comprises most of the original fort |
| 12^{§} | Fort Davis | Fort Davis | December 19, 1960 (#66000045) | Fort Davis; 30°35′45″N 103°55′33″W | Jeff Davis | From 1854 to 1891 Fort Davis protected migrants, mail coaches, and freight wagons, and controlled the southern stem of the Great Comanche War Trail and Mescalero Apache war trails. |
| 13 | Fort Richardson | Fort Richardson | November 27, 1963 (#66000816) | Jacksboro; 33°12′29″N 98°09′53″W | Jack | This Texas frontier fort was established in 1867 and abandoned in 1878. It was renovated and reopened as a state park in 1973. |
| 14 | Fort Sam Houston | Fort Sam Houston | May 15, 1975 (#75001950) | San Antonio; 29°28′35″N 98°25′51″W | Bexar | Since the 1870s this facility has served as a major military base for the southern United States. It housed Geronimo following his capture, and has been used as the launching point for a variety of military operations. |
| 15 | John Nance Garner House | John Nance Garner House | December 8, 1976 (#76002074) | Uvalde; 29°12′44″N 99°47′31″W | Uvalde | Home of John Nance Garner, vice president under Franklin Delano Roosevelt |
| 16 | Governor's Mansion | Governor's Mansion | December 2, 1974 (#70000896) | Austin; 30°16′20″N 97°44′34″W | Travis | First designated Texas historic landmark, damaged by arson June 8, 2008 |
| 17 | HA. 19 (Midget Submarine) | HA. 19 (Midget Submarine) | June 30, 1989 (#89001428) | Fredericksburg; 30°16′20″N 98°52′06″W | Gillespie | Historic I.J.N. Ko-hyoteki class midget submarine; part of the Japanese attack on Pearl Harbor on December 7, 1941; grounded and captured |
| 18 | Hangar 9, Brooks Air Force Base | Hangar 9, Brooks Air Force Base | December 8, 1976 (#70000895) | San Antonio; 29°20′32″N 98°26′37″W | Bexar | Only surviving hangar of 16 built at Brooks Air Force Base (now Brooks City-Base) in 1918. Now a special events venue. |
| 19 | Harrell Site | | July 19, 1964 (#66000825) | South Bend | Young | A late prehistoric Plains Indian archeological site. |
| 20 | Highland Park Shopping Village | Highland Park Shopping Village | February 16, 2000 (#97001393) | Highland Park; 32°50′09″N 96°48′20″W | Dallas | Second shopping mall constructed in the U.S.; opened in 1931, and still in operation |
| 21 | Hueco Tanks | Hueco Tanks | January 13, 2021 (#100006241) | East of El Paso; 31°55′13″N 106°02′19″W | El Paso | State Historic Site (TPWD) |
| 22^{†} | J A Ranch | J A Ranch | December 19, 1960 (#66000807) | Amarillo; 34°49′00″N 101°11′17″W | Armstrong | Founded by John George Adair and Charles Goodnight, this is still one of the largest ranches in the Texas Panhandle, and remains in the hands of Adair descendants. |
| 23^{#} | Lyndon Baines Johnson Boyhood Home | Lyndon Baines Johnson Boyhood Home | May 23, 1966 (#69000202) | Johnson City; 30°14′27″N 98°37′27″W | Blanco | Boyhood home of President Lyndon B. Johnson. Johnson lived here from the age of five until his high school graduation in 1924. |
| 24^{†} | King Ranch | King Ranch | November 5, 1961 (#66000820) | Kingsville; 27°31′07″N 97°55′01″W | Kenedy, Kleberg, Nueces, and Willacy | Founded in 1853, this is the largest ranch in the United States; it is larger than Rhode Island. |
| 25 | Landergin Mesa | | July 19, 1964 (#66000821) | Vega | Oldham | This is a major Panhandle culture archeological site. |
| 26 | USS Lexington | USS Lexington | July 19, 2003 (#03001043) | Corpus Christi; 27°48′54″N 97°23′19″W | Nueces | This Essex-class aircraft carrier, known as "The Blue Ghost", was the fifth United States Naval ship named in honor of the Revolutionary War Battle of Lexington. After service in the Second World War and the Cold War, it is now a museum ship. |
| 27^{†} | Lower Pecos Canyonlands Archeological District | Lower Pecos Canyonlands Archeological District | January 13, 2021 (#100006256) | Lower Pecos River watershed area 29°48′N 101°27′W | Val Verde | Thirty-five mostly discontiguous rock art and other archeological sites; also listed in part in several other NRHP listings in Val Verde County, including Seminole Canyon Archeological District, Lower Pecos Canyon Archeological District, Mile Canyon, and the Rattlesnake Canyon Site. |
| 28 | Lubbock Lake Site | Lubbock Lake Site | December 22, 1977 (#71000948) | Lubbock; 33°37′19″N 101°53′23″W | Lubbock | This major archeological site includes evidence from as far back as 10,000BC. The public can view ongoing archeological work at the site. |
| 29 | Lucas Gusher, Spindletop Oil Field | Lucas Gusher, Spindletop Oil Field | November 13, 1966 (#66000818) | Beaumont; 30.019167°N 94.073889°W; 30°01′09″N 94°04′26″W | Jefferson | The Spindletop Oil Field was in 1901 where the first major oil gusher of the Texas Oil Boom was discovered. |
| 30 | Majestic Theatre | Majestic Theatre | April 19, 1993 (#75001952) | San Antonio; 29°25′35″N 98°29′27″W | Bexar | This 1929 theater is the largest in Texas and the second largest in the United States. |
| 31 | Mission Concepcion | Mission Concepcion | April 15, 1970 (#70000740) | San Antonio; 29°23′27″N 98°29′34″W | Bexar | Part of San Antonio Missions National Historical Park, this 1731 Spanish mission was also the site of the 1831 Battle of Concepción, and early action in the Texas Revolution. |
| 32 | Jose Antonio Navarro House Complex | Jose Antonio Navarro House Complex | December 23, 2016 (#100000830) | San Antonio; 29°25′22″N 98°29′49″W | Bexar | Home of Tejano rights advocate José Antonio Navarro, one of only two native-born Texans to sign the Texas Declaration of Independence. |
| 33 | Palmito Ranch Battlefield | Palmito Ranch Battlefield | September 25, 1997 (#93000266) | Brownsville; 25°56′48″N 97°17′07″W | Cameron | Site of the 1865 Battle of Palmito Ranch, the last major engagement of the American Civil War. |
| 34^{#} | Palo Alto Battlefield | Palo Alto Battlefield | December 19, 1960 (#66000812) | Brownsville; 26°01′17″N 97°28′50″W | Cameron | Site of the 1846 Battle of Palo Alto, a precipitating event of the Mexican–American War. |
| 35 | Plainview Site | | January 20, 1961 (#66000814) | Plainview | Hale | A major archeological site known for Plainview point spear tips. |
| 36 | Walter C. Porter Farm | Walter C. Porter Farm | July 19, 1964 (#66000819) | Terrell; 32°46′40″N 96°16′28″W | Kaufman | Part of this farm was used as an experimental agricultural farm in the early 20th century. Successful experiments here led to the establishment of the United States Department of Agriculture's Agricultural Extension Service. |
| 37 | Presidio Nuestra Senora De Loreto De La Bahia | Presidio Nuestra Senora De Loreto De La Bahia | December 24, 1967 (#67000024) | Goliad; 28°38′48″N 97°22′54″W | Goliad | Chapel and former fortress compound; now a museum; built by the Spanish Empire in the 18th century; also used as a fortress in the 19th century; scene of the 1836 Battle of Goliad and Goliad Massacre |
| 38^{†} | Randolph Field Historic District | Randolph Field Historic District | August 7, 2001 (#96000753) | San Antonio; 29°31′56″N 98°16′48″W | Bexar | The historic core of Randolph Air Force Base, this area was established in the 1920s as a training field for military aviators. |
| 39 | Samuel T. Rayburn House | Samuel T. Rayburn House | May 11, 1976 (#72001361) | Bonham; 33°34′05″N 96°12′26″W | Fannin | Longtime home of United States Speaker of the House Samuel T. Rayburn |
| 40 | Resaca De La Palma Battlefield | Resaca De La Palma Battlefield | December 19, 1960 (#66000813) | Brownsville; 25°56′15″N 97°29′10″W | Cameron | Site of the 1846 Battle of Resaca de La Palma, fought early in the Mexican–American War. |
| 41 | Rio Vista Bracero Reception Center | Rio Vista Bracero Reception Center | December 11, 2023 (#100009831) | Socorro; 31°39′41″N 106°15′59″W | El Paso | |
| 42^{†} | Roma Historic District | Roma Historic District | November 4, 1993 (#72001371) | Roma; 26°24′22″N 99°01′05″W | Starr | A well-preserved 19th century Rio Grande border town. |
| 43 | San Jacinto Battlefield | San Jacinto Battlefield | December 19, 1960 (#66000815) | Houston; 29°44′56″N 95°04′49″W | Harris | Site of the decisive Battle of San Jacinto, securing the independence of Texas from Mexico. |
| 44 | Space Environment Simulation Laboratory, Chambers A and B | Space Environment Simulation Laboratory, Chambers A and B | October 3, 1985 (#85002810) | Houston; 29°33′32″N 95°05′17″W | Harris | This laboratory for testing equipment in space-like environments has been in use since 1965. |
| 45 | Spanish Governor's Palace | Spanish Governor's Palace | April 15, 1970 (#70000741) | San Antonio; 29°25′30″N 98°29′40″W | Bexar | This early Spanish colonial house was home to aristocratic leaders of the Spanish Texas, and is now a city museum. |
| 46^{†} | Strand Historic District | Strand Historic District | May 11, 1976 (#70000748) | Galveston; 29°18′23″N 94°47′37″W | Galveston | The Victorian downtown of Galveston. |
| 47 | USS TEXAS | USS TEXAS | December 8, 1976 (#76002039) | Houston; 29°45′15″N 95°05′22″W | Harris | After seeing action in the First and Second World Wars, this ship was the first United States Navy battleship to become a museum, and the first to be named a National Historic Landmark. |
| 48 | Texas State Capitol | Texas State Capitol | June 23, 1986 (#70000770) | Austin; 30°16′22″N 97°44′28″W | Travis | The seat of Texas government, construction on this Italian Renaissance Revival building began in the 1870s. |
| 49 | Trevino-Uribe Rancho | Trevino-Uribe Rancho | August 5, 1998 (#73002342) | San Ygnacio; 27°02′42″N 99°26′36″W | Zapata | Fortified house built c. 1830, shortly after San Ygnacio's founding. |
| 50 | Woodland | Woodland | May 30, 1974 (#74002097) | Huntsville; 30°42′53″N 95°33′10″W | Walker | This modest house was the home of Texas leader Sam Houston in the 1840s and 1850s. |

== Former National Historic Landmark in Texas ==
| | Landmark name | Image | Date of designation | Date of withdrawal | Locality | County | Description |
|---|---|---|---|---|---|---|---|
| 1 | USS Cabot (CVL-28) | | June 21, 1990 (90000334) | August 7, 2001 | Brownsville | Cameron | The Cabot was the last remaining of nine former Independence-class light aircraft carriers built in late 1943. War correspondent Ernie Pyle dubbed her the "Iron Maiden" as she served in nearly every major Pacific battle of WW II during her service without repair stops earning her nine battle stars and a Presidential Unit Citation. She would later be transferred to the Spanish Navy where she would serve from 1967 to 1989 as the SNS Dédalo. She was later purchased by preservation interests and returned to the U.S. first at New Orleans and then moored at Brownsville in 1997. As fund-raising efforts for her rehabilitation were ultimately unsuccessful, she was scrapped for salvage in 2000. |

== See also ==
- List of National Historic Landmarks by state
- National Register of Historic Places listings in Texas
- History of Texas
- List of areas in the United States National Park System
- List of National Natural Landmarks in Texas
