= Harrell site =

- Harrell Site
- U.S. National Register of Historic Places
- U.S. National Historic Landmark
- Nearest city: South Bend, Texas
- Area: 10 acres (4.0 ha)
- NRHP reference No.: 66000825

Significant dates
- Added to NRHP: October 15, 1966
- Designated NHL: July 19, 1964

The Harrell Site, also known as the M. D. Harrell Site, is a prehistoric Native American archeological site near South Bend in southern Young County, Texas. The site was discovered in 1937 as a result of survey work for the area to be inundated by the Possum Kingdom Lake. The site occupies the first and second terraces above the Brazos River's floodplain. Archeological investigation began in 1938 as a Work Projects Administration and University of Texas Statewide Archeological Survey. The site is believed to be that of a Plains Indian agricultural village, and was first excavated in 1938–39. The site's major element is a large midden and hearth, with a number of smaller hearth features and burial sites nearby. The site contains artifacts from the Late Prehistoric period, approximately 1200 AD to 1600 AD, including a variety of chipped stone points and scrapers. Fired earthenware bowls and jars have also been found. It is also the site where a particular type of projectile point, known as the Harrell point, was first identified, and was identified as the type site of the Henrietta focus in 1946.

The site contains numerous hearths and more than one hundred burial sites, suggesting a settled population. Burials are often fragmentary in nature, with a few covered by limestone slabs. Excavations have also found evidence of mass graves, scalpings, and bodies with other signs of murder and mutilation such as dismemberment and arrow wounds dating back around 1000 - 1500 A.D., leading archaeologists to believe the area was fought over because of its access to water and fertile farmland. The site is still under excavation today.

== See also ==
- List of National Historic Landmarks in Texas
- National Register of Historic Places listings in Young County, Texas
