= Gene Jones (American football) =

American football player (born 1936–2008)

No. 72, 25
- Positions: Defensive back, End

Personal information
- Born: October 18, 1936; Woodson, Texas, U.S.
- Died: January 3, 2008 (aged 71); Houston, Texas, U.S.
- Listed height: 6 ft 0 in (1.83 m)
- Listed weight: 200 lb (91 kg)

Career information
- High school: Woodson
- College: Rice (1955–1958)
- NFL draft: 1959: 13th round, 153rd overall pick

Career history
- Chicago Bears (1959)*; Hamilton Tiger-Cats (1959–1960); Houston Oilers (1961)
- * Offseason or practice squad member only

Awards and highlights
- AFL champion (1961); Second-team All-SWC (1958)
- Stats at Pro Football Reference

Ray Gene Jones (October 18, 1936 – January 3, 2008) was an American former professional football defensive back and end who played in the American Football League (AFL) with the Houston Oilers. He played college football for the Rice Owls. Jones was also a member of the Chicago Bears in the National Football League (NFL) and the Hamilton Tiger-Cats of the Canadian Football League (CFL).

== Early life ==
Jones was born on October 18, 1936, in Woodson, Texas. He attended Woodson High School and played football at end.

== College career ==
Jones played college football for the Rice Owls from 1955 to 1958. He was a three-year letterman from 1956 to 1958 at right end. In 30 games, Jones had 11 receptions for 198 yards, and two touchdowns. In 1958, he was named to the All-Southwest Conference second team and invited to play in the Blue–Gray Football Classic.

== Professional career ==
=== Chicago Bears ===
Jones was selected in the thirteenth round, with the 153rd overall selection, by the Chicago Bears in the 1959 NFL draft. He was released by the team prior to the start of the 1959 season.

=== Hamilton Tiger-Cats ===
On September 30, 1959, Jones signed with the Hamilton Tiger-Cats of Canadian Football League (CFL). He played 11 games and had seven receptions for 194 yards, one touchdown and one interception.

In August 1960, Jones was involved in a contract dispute when Chicago Bears head coach, George Halas, claimed that he was still property of the Bears and said "if we need him, we'll get him". General manager of the Tiger-Cats, Jake Gaudaur, said that it would be impossible for such a deal to exist as they could not send him to any club or league without going through the waiver process.

=== Houston Oilers ===
In 1961, Jones signed with the Houston Oilers of the American Football League (AFL). He played in one game at defensive back and was a member of the team when they won the 1961 AFL Championship game.
