= Newcastle High School (Texas) =

Location
- 500 Washington Avenue; Newcastle, Texas 76372-0129; United States; 33.188321°N 98.737775°W

Information
- School type: Public high school
- School district: Newcastle Independent School District
- Principal: Debbie Wilkinson
- Staff: 22.55 (FTE)
- Grades: PK-12
- Enrollment: 225 (2023-2024)
- Student to teacher ratio: 9.98
- Colors: Green, white, and black
- Athletics conference: UIL Class A
- Mascot: Bobcat
- Website: Newcastle High School

Newcastle High School or Newcastle School is a public high school located in Newcastle, Texas (USA) and classified as a 1A school by the UIL. It is part of the Newcastle Independent School District located in central Young County. In 2015, the school was rated "Met Standard" by the Texas Education Agency.

== Athletics ==
The Newcastle Bobcats compete in these sports:

- Basketball
- Cross country
- Six-man football
- Golf
- Tennis
- Track and field
- Volleyball

=== State champions ===
- Girls Basketball
  - 2024(1A)

==== State finalist ====
- Football
  - 1951(1A)

== See also ==
List of Six-man football stadiums in Texas
