= Roma Historic District =

Historic district in Texas, United States

- U.S. National Register of Historic Places
- U.S. National Historic Landmark District
- Recorded Texas Historic Landmark
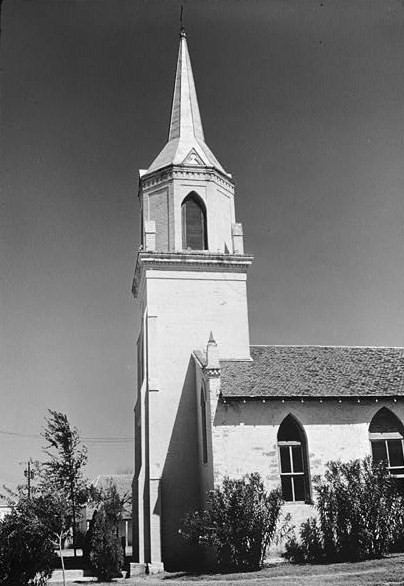
- Tower of the Church of Our Lady of Refuge of Sinners

- Location within Texas Location within the United States
- Location: Properties along Estrella and Hidalgo Sts. between Garfield St. and Bravo Alley, Roma, Texas
- Coordinates: 26°24′22″N 99°1′5″W
- Area: 27.5 acres (11.1 ha)
- Architect: Heinrich (Enrique) Portscheller, John Vale
- Architectural style: Classical Revival, Vernacular Mexican
- NRHP reference No.: 72001371
- RTHL No.: 6062, 14283

Significant dates
- Added to NRHP: July 31, 1972
- Designated NHLD: November 4, 1993
- Designated RTHL: 1973

The Roma Historic District in Roma, Texas preserves an intact example of a border town in the lower Rio Grande valley. The town was an important port and transshipment point on the Rio Grande from 1829 to the 1880s.

The architecture of Roma mirrors its sister city of Ciudad Mier on the Mexican side of the river, as well as Guerrero Viejo upriver. Roma is notable for its buildings of river sandstone, caliche limestone and molded brick, using rejoneado (patterned large and small stones) and sillar (stone laid in an ashlar pattern) masonry techniques. Both methods employ an outer finish of rough lime plaster detailed with bands of smooth colored plaster, characteristic of northern Mexico.

Roma also features innovative use of molded brick, brought to Roma by German immigrant Enrique (Heinrich) Portscheller, who used techniques of flat brick roofing from Monterrey to Mier, then developed a decorative brick used in Roma, Mier, Rio Grande City and Laredo. Portscheller designed buildings with his products and used wrought iron balconies in a manner reminiscent of both New Orleans and Monterrey. Roma preserves the bulk of his extant work.

The historic district includes the 1928 Roma-Ciudad Miguel Alemán International Bridge, a State Antiquities Landmark, as well as the river wharfs and custom house.

== History ==
Roma was established in 1821 in what had been the Spanish province of Nuevo Santander. The site offered a convenient crossing on the Rio Grande, which became known as El Paso de la Mula (Pass of the Mules). The area was notable for a salt trade from the Roma area to Monterrey. The Roma area became the Mexican province of Tamaulipas with Mexican independence, but then became part of Texas with the establishment of the Republic of Texas in 1835. Although there was a battle at Mier during the Mexican–American War in 1848, the region remained part of Texas. During the American Civil War the region became wealthy on the cotton trade, which was transshipped via Mexico to Europe. While steamboats were able to access Roma through the mid-nineteenth century, lowering water levels as a result of development upstream ended river shipment by the 1880s. Bypassed by railroads, Roma stagnated and inadvertently preserved itself from development.

== Description ==
The Roma Historic District comprises 38 contributing buildings, of which 16 are stone buildings from the 1829-1870 period and 19 are brick buildings from the 1880-1900 period. The district may be divided into the following areas:

- Plaza Area The plaza area features an open-ended plaza that faces the Rio Grande and Mexico on the far bank. It the northern end is the tower of the Catholic Church, on axis with the plaza. The lower plaza is defined by walled compounds built for the Vale-Garcia, Cox, Guerra, Saenz and Ramirez families. These compounds included commercial uses, particularly the Guerra store that dominated the town's commerce.
- Wharf Area The wharf area along Hidalgo Street and upwards to Juarez and Estrella Streets dealt with river commerce and consist of warehouses and stores, as well as the Roma-Ciudad Miguel Aleman Bridge. It is associated with the Arroyo de San Pedro.
- Customs House Area The customs house area includes Lincoln and Water Streets, comprising a mixture of commercial and residential structures, chiefly of stone construction and dominated by a brick family compound at Zaragoza and Estrella. The customs house was placed on the highest point on the bluff.
- Northwestern Zone The northwestern zone is associated with the Arroyo de los Negros, the location of a secondary ferry crossing on the Rio Grande.

The Roma Historic District was listed on the National Register of Historic Places in 1972 and was designated a National Historic Landmark in 1993. In addition to the international bridge, the Manuel Guerra Home and Store is also a State Antiquities Landmark. The district is a Recorded Texas Historic Landmark (RTHL) listed as Early Commercial Center, and includes several individual RTHLs.

== See also ==
- List of National Historic Landmarks in Texas
- National Register of Historic Places listings in Starr County, Texas
- Recorded Texas Historic Landmarks in Starr County
