= Woodson High School =

Woodson High School may refer to:

- The secondary school of Woodson Independent School District in Woodson, Texas
- H. D. Woodson High School in Washington, D.C.
- Carter G. Woodson High School in Fairfax County, Virginia
