= Pleasant Tackitt =

American politician

Pleasant Tackitt.

Pleasant Tackitt (or Tackett; April 22, 1803 – February 7, 1886) (sometimes rendered as James Pleasant, but no official documents support this name) was a 19th-century politician, pioneer Methodist minister, stockman, teacher, farmer, Indian fighter, and Confederate officer. Tackitt was a key figure in the history of Arkansas and North Texas, including a state representative in the Arkansas General Assembly. Because of his battles with Indians in Texas, Tackitt became known as "the Fighting Parson".

== Early life ==
Tackitt was born in Henry County, Kentucky, to Virginian Lewis Tackitt and Mary Elizabeth Bashum, and was one of seven children. The Missouri Methodist Conference assigned Pleasant as missionary to the Western Cherokees in Arkansas in 1829. He was a circuit rider for two years and then assigned to mission schools. He married Kezia Frances Bruton on August 20, 1830, in Pope County, Arkansas. He served one term in the Arkansas General Assembly before joining a Texas-bound caravan in the autumn of 1853.

== Life in Texas ==
Pleasant settled first in the spring of 1854, two years before Parker County was organized, on Walnut Creek, about four miles west of Springtown, Texas.

He founded Goshen Church, and helped clear ground for the adjoining cemetery after providing shelter for his family. He preached his first Texas sermon in the cabin home of Hezekiah Culwell, and regularly held services at Goshen, Springtown, and Ash Creek, where he helped build churches. In 1857, he organized the First United Methodist Church of Weatherford, Texas. Then, the Texas Methodist Conference transferred Pleasant to Fort Belknap, Texas, to spread the gospel to friendly Indians and white settlers. He organized churches in Palo Pinto, Shackelford, and Young Counties, including one at Graham, Texas. Tackitt at one time had 143 appointments requiring 1,200 miles of travel to visit all. Tackitt Mountain in Young County was named for him in memory of the skirmish there in 1860 between the Tackitt family and a band of Indians led by a Comanche known to the settlers as Piny Chummy (or Pine-o-Channa). During the American Civil War, Tackitt served as chief justice and postmaster in Young County and as enrolling officer in the Confederate States Army.

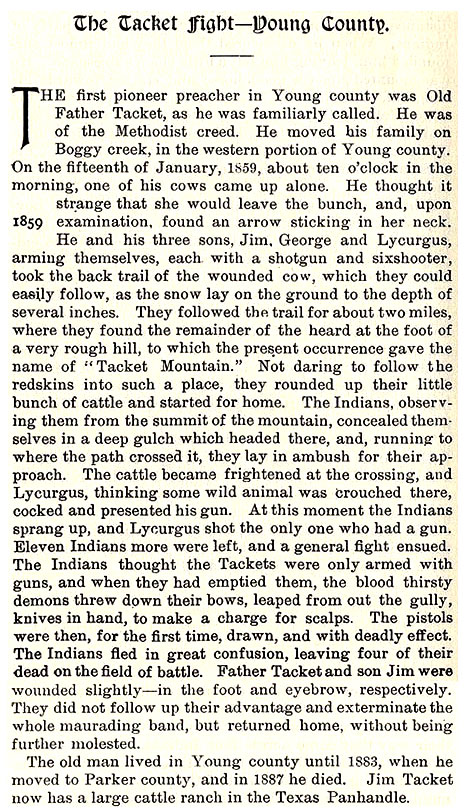
An account of Pleasant on the Texas frontier from Frontier Times magazine

== Final years ==
An often-told story emphasizes the major scares the Tackitts endured at their Fish Creek home south of Ft. Belknap. One of the family's cows came home with an arrow protruding from her back. Pleasant and his three oldest sons, James, Lycurgus and George, armed themselves and went to bring home the remainder of their herd. They were returning from the Tackitt Mountain area with the animals when 10 Indians rose from a ravine ambush. When the arrows and bullets ceased, four attackers lay dead, and James had a dangerous arrow point lodged in his skull and Pleasant was suffering from a point that pierced one foot. Both suffered great pain, but survived. Frontier life had tense episodes, but all Pleasant's children lived long lives, mostly into their 80s. His brother, Mann Darius Tackitt, was not so lucky. He was slain by a pillaging Indian band on his ranch in Jack County. Pleasant Tackitt returned to Parker County in the last years of his life and is buried in Goshen Cemetery beside his wife.

== Frontier life ==
According to a 1925 article in Frontier Times magazine:

I wish now to record one of the best Indian fights ever fought on our northern frontier by citizens against Indians. This fight like the major part of our frontier life and battles with Indians, has never been recorded in history, but by all means ought to have been. The fight was by Rev. Pleasant Tackitt and his three young sons. Jim Tackitt, twenty-two years old, L. L.- Tackitt, twenty, and George Tackitt, sixteen. Rev. Tackitt was armed with a rifle and dragoon six-shooter; Jim Tackitt had a rifle and Navy six-shooter and L. L. Tackitt had a double-barreled shot gun and Navy six shooter. The first Indian raid into Young county after they were moved to the Indian territory was in January 1860. On the evening of January 13th one of the Tackitt's milk cows came home with an arrow sticking in her back. Mrs. Tackitt, after discovering the arrow when she went to milk, went to the house and reported the fact. It was then late in, the evening. Rev. Tackitt and the three older boys above named made ready to start the next morning on foot to see if they could find the Indians and also learn what they had done with other stock. There had been a deep snow and sleet on the ground for a week or ten days. The Tackitts then lived on Fish Creek in Young county. Early on the morning of the 14th about sun-rise, the Rev' Tackitt and the three boys left home in pursuit of the Indians; they took the back trail of the cows and after having gone some two miles they came to where the Indians had killed one of their cows and had… He and George both rain to the trees and in suddenly stopping behind the trees they both slipped on the snow and fell. Jim and Rev. Tackitt by this time were slightly wounded. The Indians seeing L. L. and George fall when they ran to the trees evidently thought they were killed and instantly dropped their bows and arrows in the branch and made a sudden rush.

== Children ==
Kezia Frances Bruton-Tackitt

- James Gray B. circa 1838
- Lewis Lycurgus "Like"; born May 4, 1840; Parker County, Texas Sheriff 1882–1883; commanding officer of Parker County Minute Company, Texas State Troops (Rangers), October 1865
- George Wm. Council circa 1842
- Andrew Chester Ashley born November 15, 1845; January - February 1874 - Texas Rangers, Young County, Texas.
- Robert Emmett Elias; born April 10, 1849; justice of the peace, 1901-1922 Hall County, Texas.
- Sarah Caroline circa 1851
- Perry Anderson circa 1854

== Siblings ==
- Rev. Moranda Tackitt
- Nathaniel Tackitt
- Elizabeth Tackitt Davis
- Sarah Louisa Tackitt Benefield Bewley
- Mann Darius Tackitt
- Martin Tackitt
- Ferby Tackitt Smith

The Pleasant Tackitt who was killed as a result of the Mountain Meadows massacre was the son of Martin Tackitt.
