= Tackett Mountain (Texas) =

Mountain in Texas, United States

Tackitt Mountain
- Location within Texas

Highest point
- Elevation: 1,375 ft (419 m)
- Prominence: 180 ft (55 m)
- Parent peak: Miller Benchmark
- Coordinates: 33°00′10″N 98°46′50″W

Geography
- Location: Young County, Texas, U.S.
- Topo map: USGS Tackitt Mountain

Geology
- Mountain type: limestone

Climbing
- First ascent: 1850s

Tackitt (Tackett) Mountain is a summit in Young County, Texas, USA. It is located west of the Graham, Texas. Site of famous Indian battle between Pleasant Tackitt and Old Piny Chummy.

In the Descriptive History of Early Times in Western Texas, Volume 2, by Joseph Carroll McConnell mentions Tackitt Mountain in the book about the area:

"Pleasant Tackitt, a Methodist minister, settled in Parker County in

1854. Two years later he moved his family to Young County, and numbered among the first settlers of that section. The Tackitt home was located on the old Fort Belknap and Austin Road, about nine miles south of the post, near Fish Creek: so named for the Tackitts broke the ice and caught fish during the severe winter weather.....in the evening of February 13, 1860, one of Mr. Tackitt's milk cows came home through the sleet and snow with an arrow sticking in her side......[Tackitt] back-tracked the cows about three-fourths of a mile, to where they found moccasin racks and saw blankets hanging on the east end of Tackitt Mountain. Tackitt thought it unwise to make an open attack, but decided to advance upon the Indian's from the north......Almost instantly several Indians charged like wild demons. These Indians were under the leadership of Old Piny Chummy, who only a few months before lived on the Comanche Reservation, near old Camp Cooper. Tackitt and his sons knew him well, and no doubt, Piny Chummy recognized the Tackitts......Old Piny Chummy charged Parson Tackitt himself, and the old chief received a mortal wound from the discharge of the parson's gun......A white flag was found flying from the top of a tree on Tackitt Mountain; and under it were found four bridles, four ropes, four bows, and four quivers of arrows, as well as blankets and other implements. A few days later, soaring vultures disclosed the graves of four warriors killed in this fight.

'"
