= Ken Beck (American football) =

American football player (1935–2006)

- Beck as a Texas Aggie

No. 73, 57, 50, 51
- Positions: Defensive tackle, defensive end

Personal information
- Born: September 3, 1935; Minden, Louisiana, U.S.
- Died: March 5, 2006 (aged 70); Cotton Valley, Louisiana, U.S.
- Listed height: 6 ft 2 in (1.88 m)
- Listed weight: 245 lb (111 kg)

Career information
- High school: Minden
- College: Texas A&M
- NFL draft: 1959: 4th round, 38th overall pick

Career history
- Chicago Cardinals (1959)*; Green Bay Packers (1959–1960); Minnesota Vikings (1961)*; Toronto Argonauts (1961–1962); Saskatchewan Roughriders (1963)
- * Offseason or practice squad member only

Awards and highlights
- Second-team All-SWC (1958)
- Stats at Pro Football Reference

Kenneth Lee Beck (September 3, 1935 – March 5, 2006), was a defensive tackle in the National Football League (NFL). Beck played two seasons with the Green Bay Packers. He was a member of the Western Division Champion Packers in 1960. Beck was chosen by the Minnesota Vikings in the 1961 Expansion Draft, but was released by team at the end of training camp. He played for the Canadian Football League Toronto Argos from 1961 to 1962 under Coach Lou Agassi. Beck was one of only two men to have played for both Bear Bryant and Vince Lombardi.
