= Hector Hugo Gonzalez =

Nurse and nurse educator

- Born: Hector Hugo Gonzalez; March 9, 1937 (age 89); Roma, Texas, U.S.
- Education: Robert B. Green Memorial Hospital School of Nursing (Nursing Diploma); University of the Incarnate Word (BSN); Catholic University of America (MSN); University of Texas at Austin (PhD)

Hector Hugo Gonzalez (born March 9, 1937) is a former nurse and nurse educator. He is recognized as the first Mexican-American registered nurse to earn a Ph.D. in the United States.

== Biography ==
Hector Hugo Gonzalez was born on March 9, 1937, in Roma, Texas, to Amadeo Lorenzo Gonzalez and Carlotta Trevino. His family's roots trace back to the mid-1700s in South Texas. After graduating from Roma High School in 1955, he began college at San Antonio College before beginning nursing school.

In 1962, Gonzalez was awarded his nursing diploma from the Robert B. Green Memorial Hospital School of Nursing in San Antonio, Texas, and his Bachelor of Science in Nursing in 1963 from the Incarnate Word College (now called the University of the Incarnate Word) in San Antonio. After completing his BSN, Gonzalez attended the Catholic University of America in Washington, D.C., and earned his Master of Science in Nursing in administration of nursing education. In 1966, Gonzalez began his military career and served two years in the United States Army Nurse Corps, eventually retiring in 1968 with the rank of Captain. After completing his military service, Gonzales taught at the School of Nursing at Incarnate Word College from 1968 to 1972. In 1974, he was awarded his Ph.D. in curriculum and instruction of higher education from the University of Texas at Austin.

Gonzalez joined San Antonio College in July 1972 and was named chairman of the Department of Nursing Education, where he led the two-year RN program, a position he kept until his July 1992 retirement. During his tenure, the RN program became nationally accredited by the National League for Nursing Accrediting Commission (NLNAC), began offering part-time and evening curricula in addition to a traditional full-time curricula, and started a program offering continuing education, which was a first for a two-year nursing school.
