= Space Environment Simulation Laboratory =

- U.S. National Register of Historic Places
- U.S. National Historic Landmark
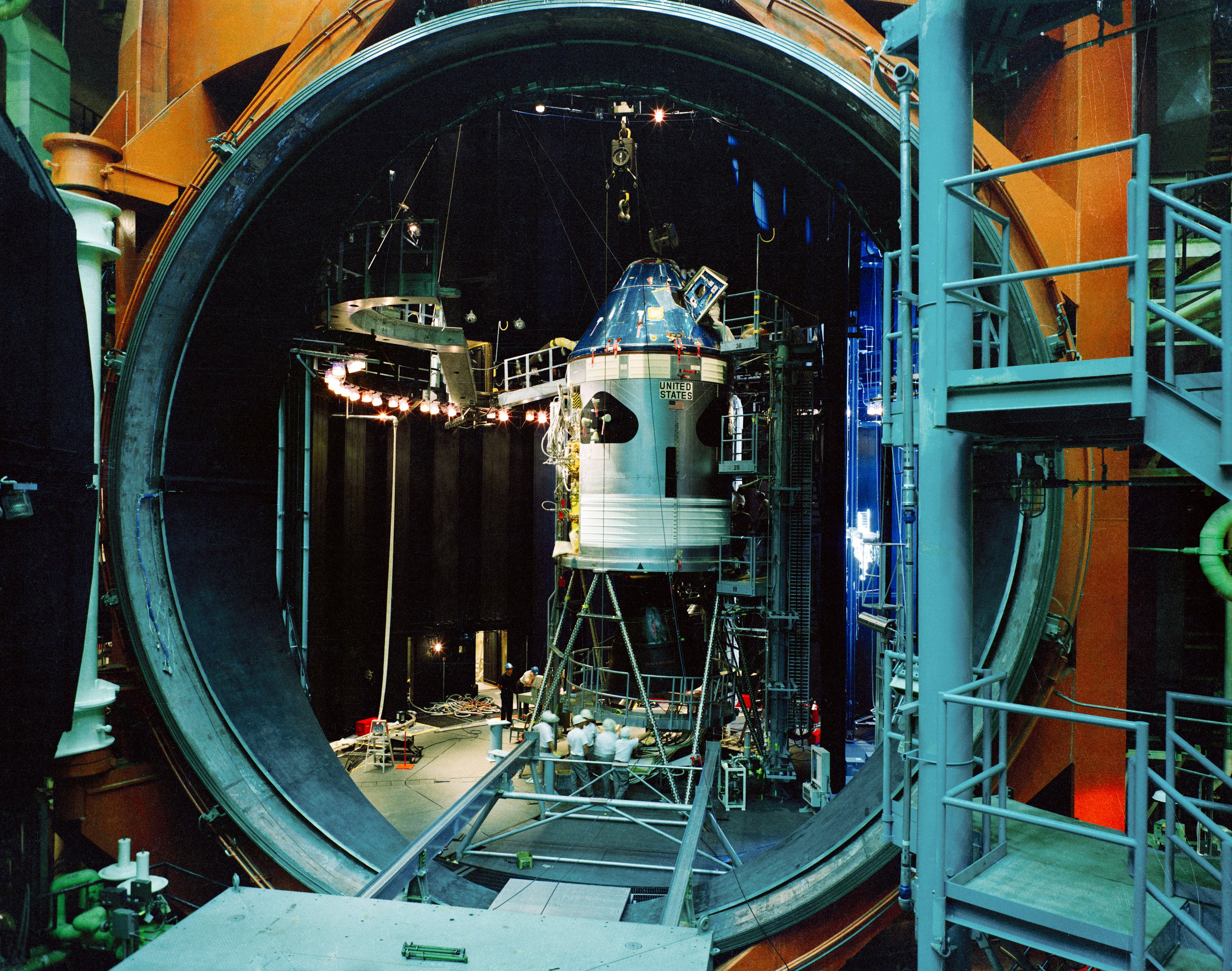
- The 2TV-1 Apollo spacecraft in Chamber A 1968

- Location within Texas Location within the United States
- Location: Lyndon B. Johnson Space Center, Houston, Texas
- Coordinates: 29°33′38″N 95°5′17″W
- Area: less than one acre
- Built: 1965
- NRHP reference No.: 85002810

Significant dates
- Added to NRHP: October 3, 1985
- Designated NHL: October 3, 1985

The Space Environment Simulation Laboratory (SESL) is a facility in Building 32 at the Lyndon B. Johnson Space Center that can perform large-scale simulations of the vacuum and thermal environments that would be encountered in space. Built in 1965, it was initially used to test Apollo Program spacecraft and equipment in a space environment, and continues to be used by NASA for testing equipment. It was designated a National Historic Landmark in 1985.

== Description ==
The Space Environment Simulation Laboratory is a large industrial test facility on the Johnson Space Center grounds in Building 32. Its principal features are two test chambers, one larger and one smaller. Both are cylindrical chambers that have the ability to provide a near vacuum, and have configurable lighting systems for simulating sunlight from a variety of angles.

=== Chamber A ===
Chamber A is the larger of the two chambers. It has a diameter of 45 feet (14 m), with a circular floor that can be rotated 180°. Test subject equipment can be maneuvered using four overhead cranes, each with a carrying capacity of 50,000 pounds. Equipment can be lifted into and out of the chamber using 100,000 pound cranes located outside the chamber. In addition to solar lighting arrays, the facility is capable of generating thermal plasma fields of a type experienced in the outer atmosphere and low Earth orbit. There are two man-sized airlocks, one at ground level, and one at 31 feet (9.4 m). These chambers are used for staging safety personnel during testing involving humans, and can be separately used for small-scale altitude tests involving low air pressures.

NASA remodeled and upgraded the chamber to test the James Webb Space Telescope. As of 2013, it is the largest high-vacuum, cryogenic-optical test chamber in the world, 55 feet (17 m) in diameter by 90 feet (27 m) tall. It is equipped with a gaseous helium shroud capable of lowering temperatures to 11 K (−439.9 °F; −262.1 °C). Additional test support equipment includes mass spectrometers, infrared cameras and television cameras were installed to monitor testing.

=== Chamber B ===
Chamber B is smaller, with a diameter of 20 feet (6.1 m), and is served by two 100,000 pound cranes. Like Chamber A, it has two airlocks; one of them is configured to a water deluge system and other elements needed to simulate oxygen-rich environments encountered on spacecraft. Its solar lighting array is also simpler than that of Chamber A, necessating the use of mirrors to achieve certain lighting angles. The smaller size of the chamber makes it possible to more efficiently perform tests on smaller objects with a more rapid turnaround time.

== Gallery ==
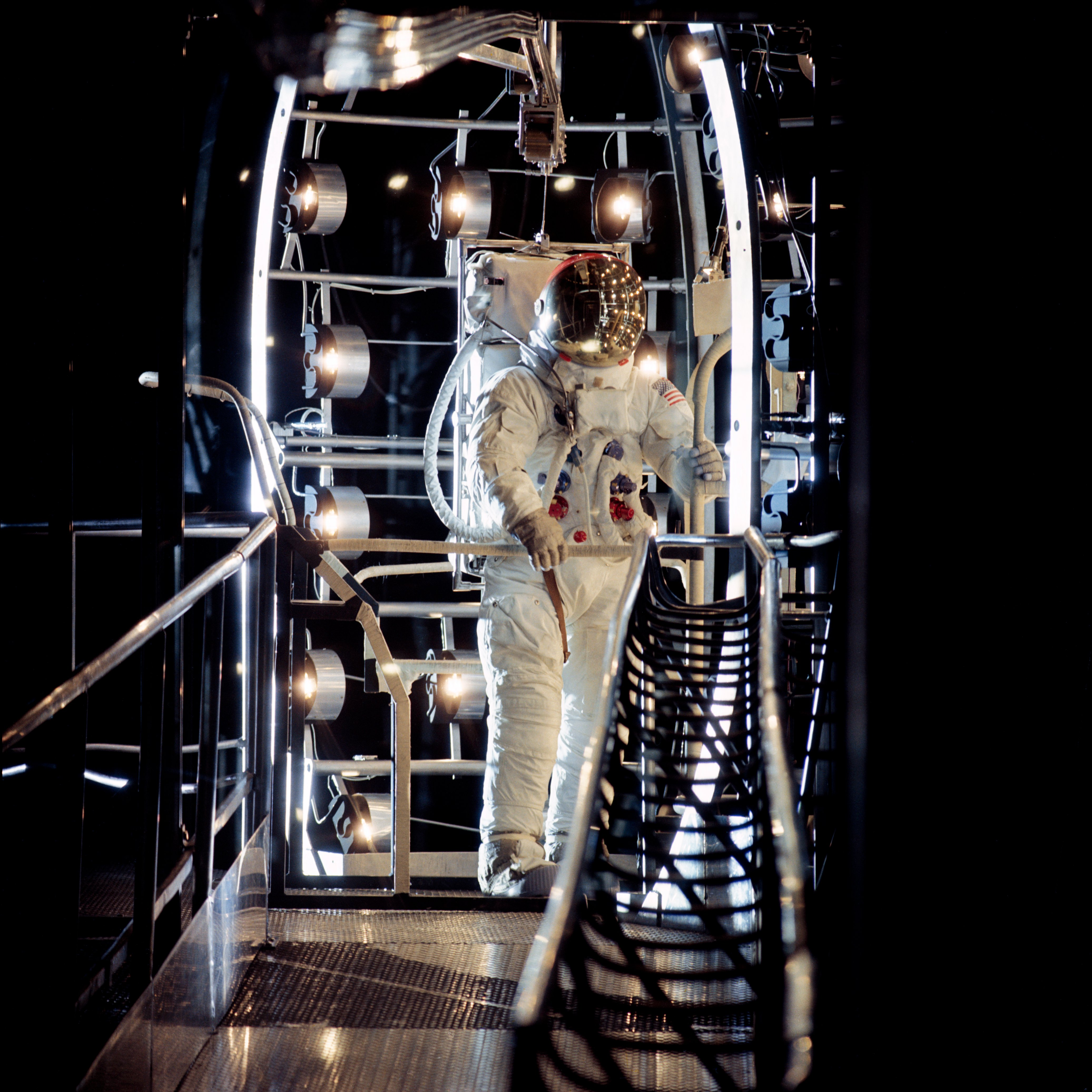
A thermal vacuum test of the Apollo A7L spacesuit system in 1968

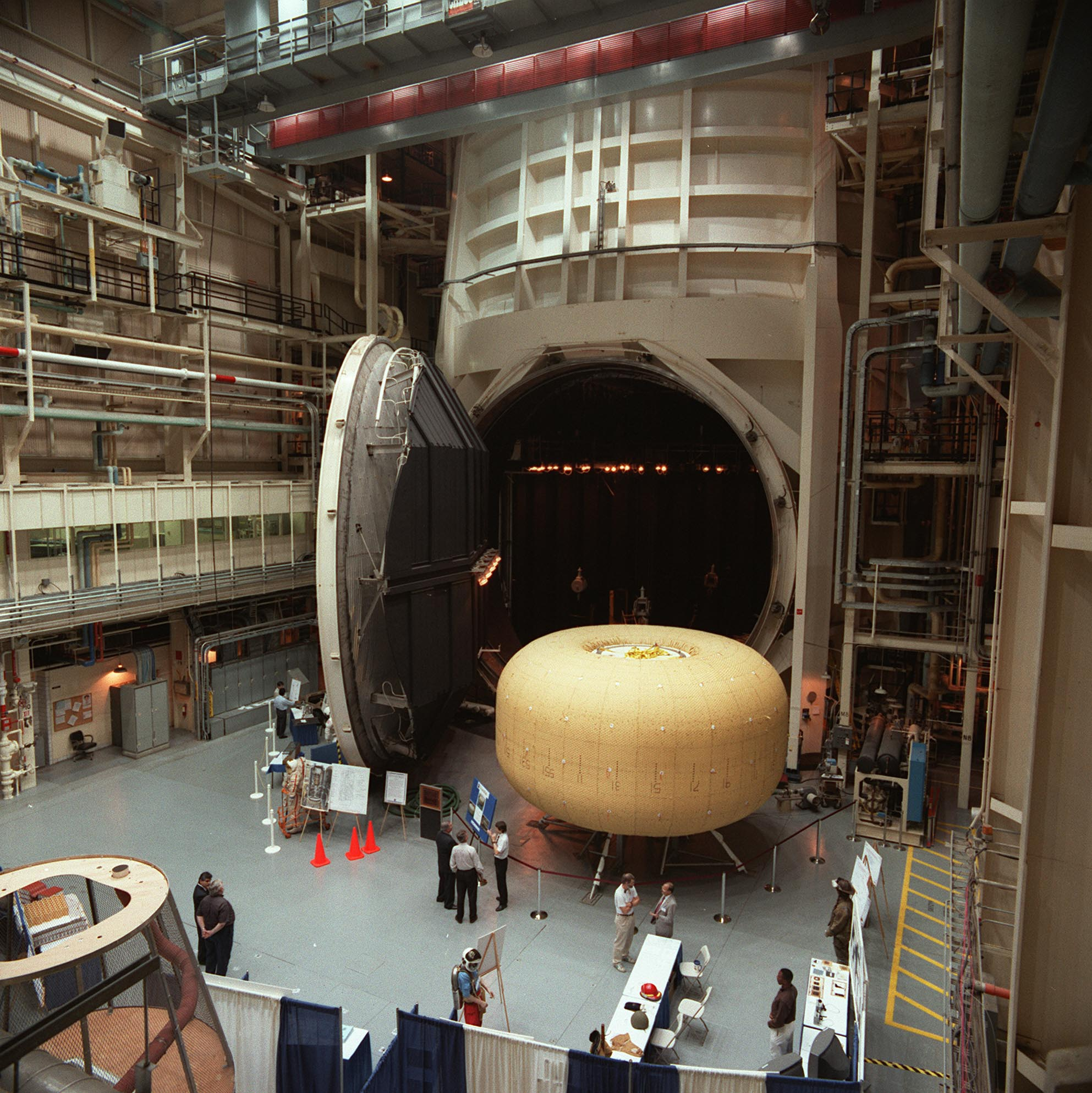
TransHab test article in 1998

== See also ==
- List of National Historic Landmarks in Texas
- National Register of Historic Places listings in Harris County, Texas
