= Tackitt =

Tackett (also spelled Tackitt) is a surname of French origin. Notable people with the surname include:

- Andrew Tackett (born 2003), American martial artist
- Ashley Tackett Laferty (born 1979), American politician
- Boyd Tackett (1911–1985), American politician in Arkansas
- Caren Lyn Tackett (born 1976), American actress
- Chuck Tackett, American politician
- Doyle Tackett (1923–2002), American football player
- E. J. Tackett (born 1992), American ten-pin bowler
- Fred Tackett (born 1945), American guitarist
- Jeff Tackett (born 1965), American baseball player
- Marnesba Tackett (1908–2007), American civil rights activist
- Michael Tackett, American journalist
- Miles Tackett, American musician
- Pleasant Tackitt (1803–1886), American politician in Texas
- Roy Tackett (1925–2003), American rifleman
- Tim Tackett (1941–2025), American martial arts instructor
- Timothy Tackett (born 1945, American historian
