= Murray, Texas =

Populated place in Texas, US

Coordinates: 33°03′23″N 098°53′42″W

Murray is a populated place in Young County, Texas, United States. It is centered on the intersection of Farm to Market Roads 209 and 578. It had a population of 45 as of the 2000 census.
