= 1958 All-Southwest Conference football team =

American college football all-star team

The 1958 All-Southwest Conference football team consists of American football players chosen by various organizations for All-Southwest Conference teams for the 1958 college football season. The selectors for the 1958 season included the Associated Press (AP) and the United Press International (UPI). Players selected as first-team players by both the AP and UP are designated in bold.

== All Southwest selections ==
=== Backs ===
- **Don Meredith**, SMU (AP-1; UPI-1 [QB])
- **Marvin Lasater**, TCU (AP-1; UPI-1 [HB])
- **Jim Mooty**, Arkansas (AP-1; UPI-1 [HB])
- **Jack Spikes**, TCU (AP-1; UPI-1 [FB])
- Charlie Milstead, Texas A&M (AP-1)
- Larry Hickman, Baylor (AP-2; UPI-2)
- Buddy Humphrey, Baylor (AP-2)
- Tirey Wilemon, SMU (AP-2)
- Pat Bailey, Rice (AP-2)
- Glynn Gregory, SMU (UPI-2)
- George Blanch, Texas (UPI-2)

=== Ends ===
- **Buddy Dial**, Rice (AP-1; UPI-1)
- **John Tracey**, Texas A&M (AP-1; UPI-1)
- Bob Bryant, Texas (AP-2; UPI-2)
- Al Witcher, Baylor (AP-2)
- Gene Jones, Rice (UPI-2)

=== Tackles ===
- **Don Floyd**, TCU (AP-1; UPI-1)
- **J. D. Smith**, Rice (AP-1; UPI-1)
- Ken Beck, Texas A&M (AP-2; UPI-2)
- James Shillingburg, Texas (AP-2)
- Paul Dickson, Baylor (UPI-2)

=== Guards ===
- **Charley Horton**, Baylor (AP-1; UPI-1)
- **Tom Koenig**, SMU (AP-1; UPI-1)
- Sherrill Headrick, TCU (AP-2; UPI-2)
- Rufus King, Rice (AP-2; UPI-2)

=== Centers ===
- **Dale Walker**, TCU (AP-1; UPI-1)
- Arlis Parkhurst, Texas (AP-2)
- Max Christian, SMU (UPI-2)

== Key ==
AP = Associated Press

UPI = United Press International

Bold = Consensus first-team selection of both the AP and UP

== See also ==
- 1958 College Football All-America Team
