= Eliasville, Texas =

Unincorporated community in Texas, US

Coordinates: 32°57′35″N 98°45′55″W

Eliasville is an unincorporated community in Young County, Texas, United States. Eliasville is located near the Clear Fork of the Brazos River at the intersection of Texas Farm Roads 1974, 3109, and 701, close to the Stephens County line in southwestern Young County, approximately 20 miles from Graham.

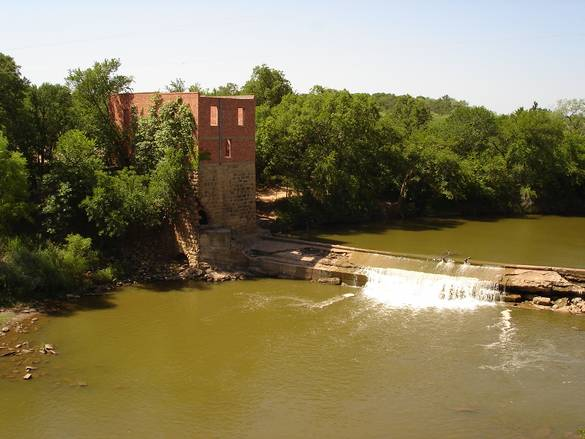
Eliasville Mill and Dam

== History ==
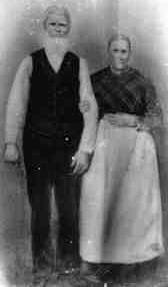
Elias DeLong - Eliasville Founder

During the 1850s, there was a river crossing near the present location of the town that was part of the Austin to Fort Belknap Military Road that was used by the 2nd U.S. Cavalry under command of Albert Sidney Johnston and Robert E. Lee. The first settlers arrived in the 1870s and Eliasville was founded on land owned by J. L. Dobbs. The town was officially named in 1878. The town is named for Elias DeLong, who opened the first store and was the grandson of James Horton DeLong, who served in the American Revolutionary War. Other early store owners include Joseph Henry Nelson who ran an early drugstore. Former Dallas Cowboys linebacker Mike Dowdle was born in Eliasville, as were two University of Texas presidents, Harry Yandell Benedict and Homer Rainey.

During the boom years of the 1920s, Eliasville grew quickly and was incorporated in 1921. W. T. Donnell was the town's first mayor. The area's minerals and oil led to this growth. During this time, the town was served by the Wichita Falls and Southern Railway. By the 1940s, the population started to drop and many moved to Fort Worth and other areas for defense work. The population was 400 in 1940, and had declined to 116 by 1980. A city lake was completed in 1952. Eliasville is no longer incorporated. As of the 2000 Census, the population was estimated to be 60. The community is best known today for the remains of the dam and historic mill.

== The mill ==
Two early residents were the Donnell brothers, William and Thomas, who established a grist mill on the Brazos River on the west side of town. The bed of the clear fork is sandstone in this area and made for a sturdy foundation on which to build a mill. The first mill was destroyed and then rebuilt in 1879 with help from a U.S. Government Engineer. The mill was destroyed by fire in 1927. The remains of the mill and dam continue to be a popular stop for photographers and those looking for a glimpse of the past.

== Education ==
During the boom years Eliasville's students were served by the DeLong Ward school. Today, students are served by the Graham Independent School District.
