= Roma–Ciudad Miguel Alemán International Bridge =

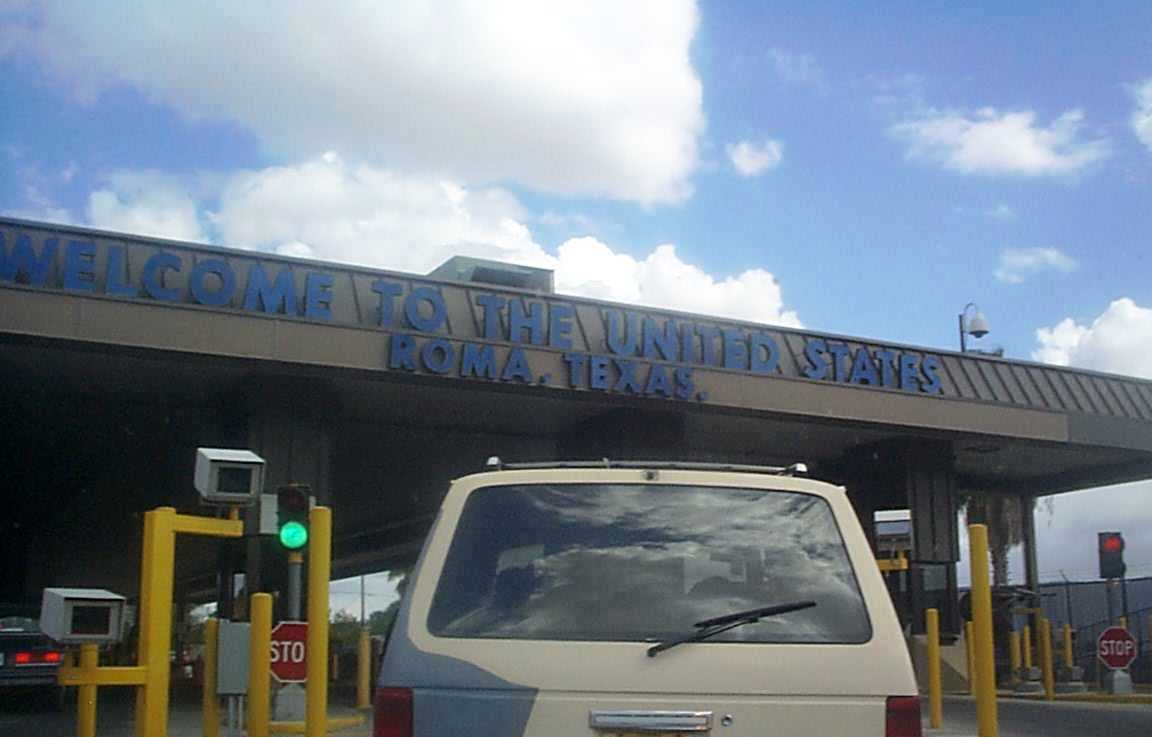
- Roma Texas Border Inspection Station
- Coordinates: 26°24′13″N 99°01′08″W
- Crosses: Rio Grande

Characteristics
- Design: Suspension
- Total length: 630 feet (190 m)

Location
- Interactive map of Roma–Ciudad Miguel Alemán International Bridge

The Roma–Ciudad Miguel Alemán International Bridge is a suspension bridge that spans the Rio Grande (known as Rio Bravo in Mexico) between Roma, Texas, and Ciudad Miguel Alemán, Tamaulipas.

The bridge was built in 1928. It is a National Historic Landmark in the United States and in Mexico. Roma was a prosperous riverport in the 19th century. Historic structures front a plaza overlooking the Rio Grande with a view of the bridge.

In 2016, the Texas and Mexico sections of the American Society of Civil Engineers declared the bridge a Historic Civil Engineering Landmark.

== Border crossing ==
The Roma Port of Entry was established in 1928 with the construction of the first suspension bridge. The current bridge was built in 1988, but the historic Roma – Ciudad Miguel Alemán International Bridge remains adjacent to it and is not currently used. The Mexican City of San Pedro de Roma was renamed Ciudad Miguel Alemán, Tamaulipas after former Mexican President Miguel Alemán Valdés. The city of Roma, Texas was once the westernmost navigable seaport on the Rio Grande, but by 1900, water drawn from the river for irrigation upstream had so severely lowered the water levels that vessel traffic had virtually ceased.

== See also ==
- List of international bridges in North America
- List of Mexico–United States border crossings
