= Newcastle Independent School District =

School district in Texas, United States

Coordinates: 33.1879°N 98.7368°W

Newcastle Independent School District is a public school district based in Newcastle, Texas (USA).

The district has one school that serves students in grades pre-kindergarten through twelve.

== Academic achievement ==
In 2009, the school district was rated "exemplary" by the Texas Education Agency.

== Special programs ==
=== Athletics ===
Newcastle High School plays six-man football.

== See also ==
- List of school districts in Texas
