= Woodson, Texas =

Town in Throckmorton County, Texas, United States

- Town
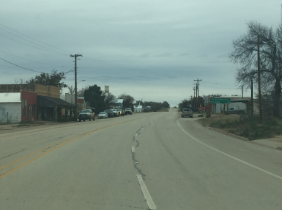
- Downtown Woodson, December 2016

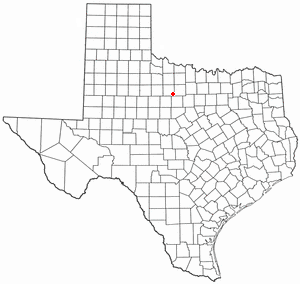
- Location of Woodson, Texas

- Coordinates: 33°00′54″N 99°03′12″W
- Country: United States
- State: Texas
- County: Throckmorton

Area
  - Total: 0.65 sq mi (1.68 km^{2})
  - Land: 0.65 sq mi (1.68 km^{2})
  - Water: 0 sq mi (0.00 km^{2})
- Elevation: 1,234 ft (376 m)

Population (2020)
  - Total: 219
  - Density: 338/sq mi (130/km^{2})
- Time zone: UTC-6 (Central (CST))
  - Summer (DST): UTC-5 (CDT)
- ZIP code: 76491
- Area code: 940
- FIPS code: 48-80188
- GNIS feature ID: 2413510

Woodson is a town in Throckmorton County, Texas, United States. As of 2020, its population was 219.

== History ==
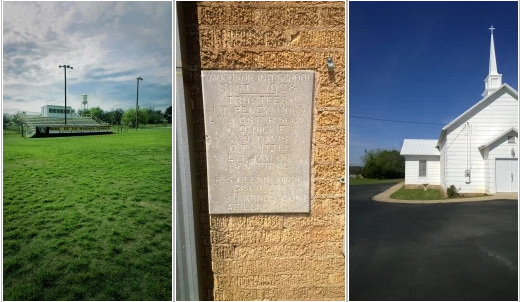
Woodson has a few notable landmarks, such as the school and the First Christian Church.

The area was initially settled in 1875 by J.O. Wood and Henry McClintick. Wood's son, O.J. Wood, played a leading role in the shaping of the community and its economics. Woodson was originally called Jom, when it was established around a cotton gin built so that the ranchers could get cottonseed to feed to cattle. After Jom was established, O.J. Wood deeded lots measuring 100 by 190 ft (30 by 58 m) to anyone who would build a residence there, free of charge. This caused businesses to start popping up, as a post office and Wood and Sons grocery were established.

Since J.O. Wood and his son built the first schoolhouse in town, the town was decided to be called Wood and Son, to honor the two. Throughout time, it was changed to Woodson, which has become the official name. Woodson eventually became a booming town, with an official start date in 1903. The first highway to Breckenridge was built in 1920.

Wood and his son also reportedly built the First Christian Church, located in the center of town on Highway 183, in the 1900s. When the original schoolhouse grew too small to hold all of Woodson's students, the First Christian Church was used as an additional educational space.

Another result of the increase in people was the building of a railroad that came through Woodson. According to Big Country: People, Events and Places, Volume V, the line was owned and operated by the Texas and Pacific Railroad. The land for the right-of-way was obtained in three ways; some was bought outright from the owners. If the owners refused to sell, the Texas and Pacific took it by easement. Some landowners gave the land for the right-of-way; for instance, the Dickie family gave land through the East Woods to the company. Local men helped build the roadbed and lay the tracks. Once the train was built, it made one run from Cisco to Throckmorton each day.

Due to the railroad and the oilfield boom, Woodson grew for a long time. The town had three gasoline service stations, two cotton gins, two barber shops, and a lumber yard.

At one point, Woodson also had a movie theater (next to the Woodson Inn), a Chevrolet dealer, a drugstore, and a feed store, next to which a local physician, Doctor Turner, ran a practice.

Woodson originally received its water from the city lake (south of town, on Highway 183, which is now known as Dickie Lake).

== Demographics ==
Historical population
Census	Pop.	Note	%±
1960	337		—
1970	340		0.9%
1980	291		−14.4%
1990	262		−10.0%
2000	296		13.0%
2010	264		−10.8%
2020	219		−17.0%
U.S. Decennial Census; 2020 Census

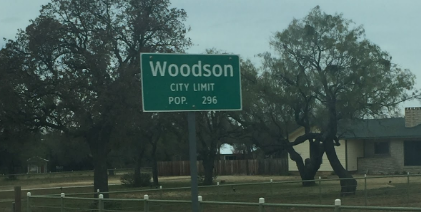
Though Woodson's population once grew to 2,800, it has recently stayed between 250 and 300.

From 1920 to 1930, Woodson's population was at an all-time high, with a count of 2,800 people. Due to surrounding areas growing, Woodson has since decreased in size. In 1948, the population was down to about 500 people.

As of the census of 2010, 264 people lived in the town, a decrease of 10.81% since 2000 (32 people). The racial makeup of the town was 62.80% White, 32.65% African American, 3.41% from other races, and 1.14% from two or more races. Hispanics or Latinos of any race were 15.91% of the population. In 2014, the population was estimated to be 258.

== Geography ==
Woodson is located in north-central Texas. It is situated at the junction of U.S. Highway 183 and Farm Roads 209 and 1710 in southeastern Throckmorton County, about 15 miles (24 km) southeast of Throckmorton.

According to the United States Census Bureau, the town has a total area of 0.6 square mile (1.7 km^{2}), all land.

=== Climate ===
The climate in this area is characterized by hot, humid summers and generally mild to cool winters. According to the Köppen climate classification, Woodson has a humid subtropical climate, Cfa on climate maps.

== Wildlife ==
Woodson is situated in semiarid, rolling hills covered in mesquite with "jumping" and prickly pear cactus, "blue brush", and occasional live or post oaks. It has hot, dry summers and cold, dry winters. The creek bottoms have huge pecan trees, hackberry, willow, "china berry", "chitelm", elm, cottonwood, and wild plums of several kinds, as well as many other trees of various types occurring at times (bois d'arc and mulberry are seen). The ground along creeks may be covered in green briars, poison ivy, or oak, and Virginia creeper grows high into the trees in places. The land, as a whole, is a patchwork of mesquite, and farm fields dotted with old oil wells. It is home to white-tailed deer, wild turkey, cotton-tailed and jack rabbits, feral hogs, bobcats, raccoons, opossums, rattlesnakes, bobwhite quail, mourning doves, armadillos, coyotes, and occasionally a badger, beaver, fox, mountain lion, and even javelina is seen. Song birds and others thrive. Many small animals dwell there, such as fox squirrels, hispid cotton rats, soft-shelled turtles, and others too numerous to mention. Large yellow catfish live in the slow-moving rivers or in the local lake and stock tanks (ponds), along with many other fish such as channel catfish, large-mouthed bass, crappie, gar, carp, buffalo fish, drum, bream, and goggle-eyed sun perch. Red-horse minnows, top-water minnows, and a species locally known as bull-head minnows live in the ponds and thrive in the rippling shallows of the river and creeks.

== 1948 tornado ==
When a tornado hit Woodson in 1948, the population had decreased to 500. Still, 32 houses were destroyed.

== Japanese balloon bomb ==
On March 23, 1945, a rancher on the Barney Davis Ranch, 8 miles (13 km) north of Woodson, Ivan Miller, found a balloon bomb in his field. The war in Europe was coming to an end, so attention was turned to finishing the job against the Japanese in the Pacific. However, the balloons obviously failed, as one ended up in a local field and the other was in Eastland County's Desdemona. Japan released over 9,000 hydrogen-filled balloons with antipersonnel and incendiary ordnance attached, and released them in the jetstream.

Miller's widow recalled later that he described the balloon to be "as big around as a house," with a large rising sun painted on its top and several smaller versions around the bottom.

About 360 bombs were eventually found in North America, though government officials requested that all pieces be returned.

== Surrounding communities ==
When Woodson was at its peak population, it had "suburbs" of sorts—surrounding communities with their own families, businesses, and school, which all eventually consolidated into Woodson ISD in the late 1930s.

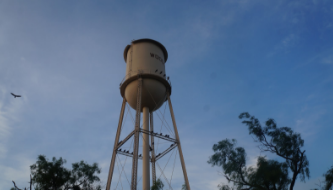
Woodson's water tower can be seen for miles outside of town.

- Titus: located west of town at the corner of Highway 209 and FM 2850
- Lusk: located south of town
- Masters: located north of town off of FM 1710
- Sunshine
- Hustuttle: located off of the Crystal Falls highway, past the turn to Eliasville
- Whiz Bang: Around 1930, a small boom town appeared near Woodson, on the road from Woodson to Masters (now 1710). Now, only a few crumbled blocks of the refinery remain.

== Education ==
Public education is provided by the Woodson Independent School District. WISD is home of the Woodson Cowboys and Cowgirls, and the school colors are black and gold. The school motto is "Be the Best You Can Be".

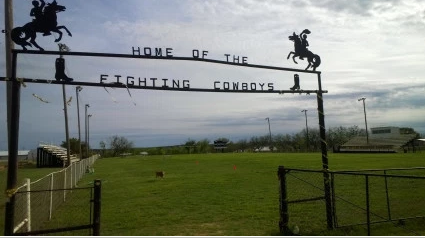
Woodson ISD is home of the Woodson Cowboys and Cowgirls.

Prekindergarten through 12th grade can attend WISD, and as of 2016, 149 students were in school, with 29 faculty and staff members. Despite the small numbers, Woodson offers many extracurricular activities, such as:

- Junior and high school basketball
- Junior and high school volleyball
- Junior and high school football
- Junior and high school track and cross country
- Junior and high school cheerleading
- Tennis
- Golf
- FFA
- National Honor Society
- One Act Play
- UIL academic events
- School newspaper
- Robotics

== Sources of income ==
Farming and ranching were the main sources of income until 1923, when the first oil well was completed. In 1925, the Stubblefield #1 well drilled by the Texas Oil Company (Texaco) came in; it has since produced more than 1,000,000 barrels (160,000 m^{3}) from that one well and in 2010 was still producing. This set off a local drilling boom, and Texaco even built a refinery north of Woodson, in Whiz Bang. Besides working the land and in the oil field, residents of Woodson can find employment through Woodson ISD, BJB Transport, and the Jones Trailer Company.

== See also ==
- List of municipalities in Texas
