= Roma, Texas =

- City
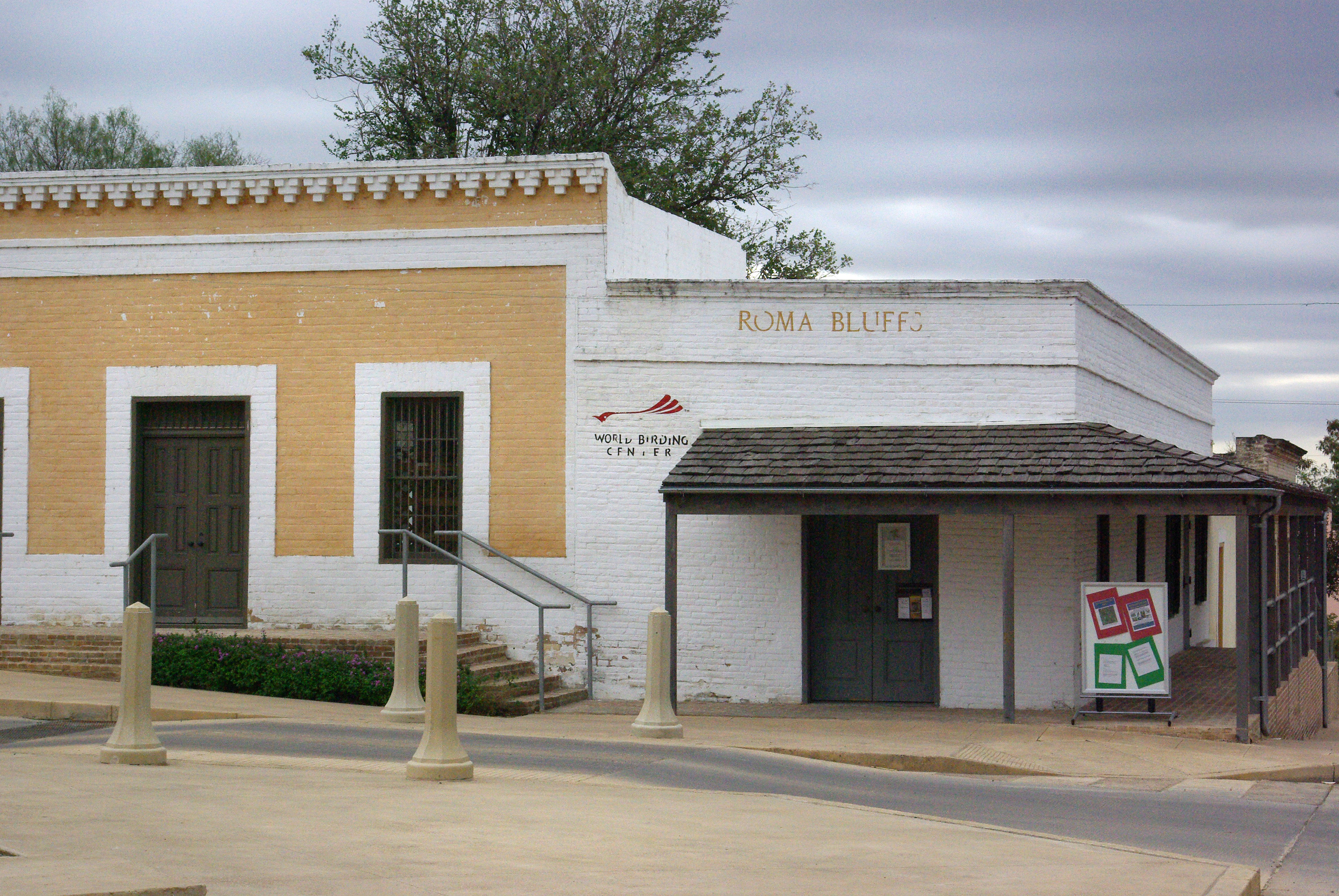

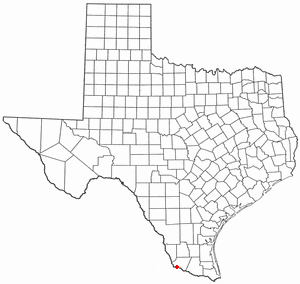
- Location of Roma, Texas

- Coordinates: 26°24′22″N 99°0′20″W
- Country: United States
- State: Texas
- County: Starr
- Incorporated: 1936

Government
  - Type: Council-Manager
  - City Council: Mayor Jaime Escobar Jr. Gabriela Rodriguez; Joel Hinojosa; Mary Lou G. Cruz; Carlos M. Gonzalez Jr. Gilberto Ramirez Jr.
  - City Manager: Crisanto Salinas

Area
  - Total: 6.00 sq mi (15.55 km^{2})
  - Land: 5.86 sq mi (15.19 km^{2})
  - Water: 0.14 sq mi (0.36 km^{2})
- Elevation: 213 ft (65 m)

Population (2020)
  - Total: 11,561
  - Density: 1,959.2/sq mi (756.44/km^{2})
- Time zone: UTC-6 (Central (CST))
  - Summer (DST): UTC-5 (CDT)
- ZIP code: 78584
- Area code: 956
- FIPS code: 48-63020
- GNIS feature ID: 1388200
- Website: www.cityofroma.net

Roma is a city in Starr County, Texas, United States. Its population was 11,561 at the 2020 census. The city is located along the Rio Grande, across from Ciudad Miguel Alemán in Tamaulipas, Mexico. The city is also popularly known as Roma-Los Saenz, since the incorporated city also took the area known as Los Saenz. It serves as a port of entry from Mexico into the U.S. via the Roma–Ciudad Miguel Alemán International Bridge.

== Sights ==
The town center has a number of picturesque historic buildings, now collected in the Roma Historic District.

Roma is a popular birding site in the Rio Grande Valley, and a section of the World Birding Center is on Portsheller Street across from the city hall.

The channel of the Rio Grande is less than 200 feet wide at Roma. The bluff adjacent to the town square overlooks the river, and parts of the Ciudad Miguel Aleman crossing are readily visible. Because of the arresting views, this location is frequently used by television journalists, public officials, and others who visit the region as a photo op to visualize the border region.

== History ==
Roma was established in 1821 in what had been the Spanish province of Nuevo Santander.

Prior to Texas's independence from Mexico in 1836, the town was listed as under the jurisdiction of the town of Mier, Tamaulipas, and prior to Mexican independence existed under Spanish rule.

The site offered a convenient crossing on the Rio Grande, which became known as El Paso de la Mula (Pass of the Mule). The area was notable for a salt trade from the Roma area to Monterrey. The Roma area became the Mexican state of Tamaulipas with the Mexican Constitution of 1824. Texas claimed Roma with the establishment of the Republic of Texas in 1835, but Mexico continued to control this area. A Texan force sought to take Roma in the Mier Expedition of 1842, which resulted in the death, capture, or execution of many volunteers.

After the Mexican–American War established U.S. control over the northern bank of the Rio Grande in 1846, Texas governed Roma. During the American Civil War, the region became wealthy on the cotton trade, which was transshipped via Mexico to Europe. While steamboats were able to access Roma through the mid-19th century, lowering water levels as a result of development upstream ended river shipment by the 1880s. Bypassed by railroads, Roma stagnated and inadvertently preserved itself from development.

The Roma National Historic Landmark District contains over 30 structures built before 1900. Some of those buildings include:

- The Customs House (Casa de Aduanas, in Spanish) is where shippers and brokers came to pay customs fees for imported goods from Europe and Mexico on steamboats.
- The John Vale/Noah Cox House was built in 1853 by Swedish immigrant John Vale; its front elevation has finely carved sandstone with classical details on the cornice.
- the Leocadia Garcia House, built in the 1840s, served first as a dwelling for José Maria Garcia, husband of Leocadia, and then as a store and dance hall.
- Ramirez Hall is the two-story home of Lino Ramirez and three generations of the Ramirez family. Built by architect Heinrich Portscheller, who personally laid brick around windows and doors, it was used as fictitious "Rosita's Cantina" in the 1950s film Viva Zapata.
- The Manuel Guerra Building is the crown jewel of restored buildings in Roma.
- The Néstor Saenz Store has direct access to the wharf area, just below Juarez Street, where steamboats anchored.
- The Edward Hord Office was built in 1853 for Edward R. Hord, who represented Mexican heirs of original landowners in the area, and during the Civil War, functioned as a military building,
- The Filomeno Gongora House, built from sandstone blocks, was erected around the 1830s, the oldest house in Roma.
- Our Lady of Refuge Church was built in 1853 by Father Pierre Yves Kéralum (1817–1872), a carpenter-turned-priest of the Oblates.
- The Parish Hall housed the convent of the Sisters of the Incarnate Word (1880s–1913) and the Sisters of Mercy (1813–1940).

== Geography ==
Roma is located at 26°24′22″N 99°0′20″W (26.406101, −99.005644).

The city gained area prior to the 2010 census giving it a total area of 4.2 square miles (11.0 km^{2}), of which 0.1 square mile (0.3 km^{2}) (4.50%) is covered by water.

The City of Roma is located along the Rio Grande, which is the frontier between the United States and Mexico.

== Demographics ==
Historical population
Census	Pop.	Note	%±
1940	1,414		—
1950	1,576		11.5%
1960	1,496		−5.1%
1970	2,154		44.0%
1980	3,384		57.1%
1990	8,059		138.2%
2000	9,617		19.3%
2010	9,765		1.5%
2020	11,561		18.4%
U.S. Decennial Census; 1850–1900 1910; 1920 1930 1940; 1950 1960 1970; 1980 1990 2000; 2010 2020

Roma first appeared as a city under the name Roma-Los Saenz in the 1940 United States census. The name was changed to Roma for the 1990 U.S. census.

=== Racial and ethnic composition ===
Roma city, Texas – Racial and ethnic composition Note: the US Census treats Hispanic/Latino as an ethnic category. This table excludes Latinos from the racial categories and assigns them to a separate category. Hispanics/Latinos may be of any race.
Race / Ethnicity (NH = Non-Hispanic)	Pop 2000	Pop 2010	Pop 2020	% 2000	% 2010	% 2020
White alone (NH)	136	498	140	1.41%	5.10%	1.21%
Black or African American alone (NH)	0	2	1	0.00%	0.02%	0.01%
Native American or Alaska Native alone (NH)	1	0	2	0.01%	0.00%	0.02%
Asian alone (NH)	2	3	3	0.02%	0.03%	0.03%
Native Hawaiian or Pacific Islander alone (NH)	0	0	0	0.00%	0.00%	0.00%
Other race alone (NH)	0	0	13	0.00%	0.00%	0.11%
Mixed race or Multiracial (NH)	1	1	17	0.01%	0.01%	0.15%
Hispanic or Latino (any race)	9,477	9,261	11,385	98.54%	94.84%	98.48%
Total	9,617	9,765	11,561	100.00%	100.00%	100.00%

=== 2020 census ===
As of the 2020 census, Roma had 11,561 people living in 3,760 households, including 2,394 families. The median age was 35.3 years; 27.9% of residents were under the age of 18 and 17.5% of residents were 65 years of age or older. For every 100 females there were 85.7 males, and for every 100 females age 18 and over there were 80.8 males age 18 and over.

Of the 3,760 households, 42.2% had children under the age of 18 living in them. Of all households, 48.1% were married-couple households, 14.1% were households with a male householder and no spouse or partner present, and 35.7% were households with a female householder and no spouse or partner present. About 20.9% of all households were made up of individuals and 11.5% had someone living alone who was 65 years of age or older.

There were 4,260 housing units, of which 11.7% were vacant. The homeowner vacancy rate was 0.6% and the rental vacancy rate was 8.3%.

97.4% of residents lived in urban areas, while 2.6% lived in rural areas.

Racial composition as of the 2020 census
Race	Number	Percent
White	3,180	27.5%
Black or African American	4	0.0%
American Indian and Alaska Native	41	0.4%
Asian	4	0.0%
Native Hawaiian and Other Pacific Islander	0	0.0%
Some other race	1,955	16.9%
Two or more races	6,377	55.2%
Hispanic or Latino (of any race)	11,385	98.5%

=== 2000 census ===
As of the census of 2000, 9,617 people, 2,678 households, and 2,351 families resided in the city. The population density was 3,490.2 inhabitants per square mile (1,347.6/km^{2}). The 3,141 housing units had an average density of 1,139.9/sq mi (439.4/km^{2}). The racial makeup of the city was 90.3% White, 0.15% African American, 0.2% Native American, 7.85% from other races, and 1.5% from two or more races. Hispanics or Latinos of any race were 98.54% of the population.

Of the 2,678 households, 50.3% had children under 18 living with them, 64.3% were married couples living together, 19.6% had a female householder with no husband present, and 12.2% were not families. About 11.7% of all households were made up of individuals, and 7.0% had someone living alone who was 65 or older. The average household size was 3.59, and the average family size was 3.91.

In the city, the age distribution was 34.9% under 18, 11.4% from 18 to 24, 25.2% from 25 to 44, 18.5% from 45 to 64, and 10.1% who were 65 or older. The median age was 28 years. For every 100 females, there were 87.9 males. For every 100 females 18 and over, there were 81.0 males.

The median income for a household in the city was $15,563, and for a family was $16,883. Males had a median income of $16,020 versus $12,656 for females. The per capita income for the city was $7,539. About 48.9% of families and 54.3% of the population were below the poverty line, including 64.2% of those under 18 and 46.3% of those 65 or over.

== Government and infrastructure ==
The city opened its first fire station, a $788,000 facility, on August 1, 2011. The Texas Department of Rural Affairs provided a $540,000 block grant to help build the station.

The United States Postal Service operates the Roma Post Office.

== Education ==
Public education in the city of Roma is provided by the Roma Independent School District. Zoned campuses include Anna S. Canavan Elementary School for pre-kindergarten, in grades K–5, the western portion of the city is zoned to Florence J. Scott Elementary and the eastern portion is zoned to Roel and Celia Saenz Elementary School. A small area located near the eastern city limit line lies within the boundaries of Ynes B. Elementary School. Roma is served by both of the district's middle schools—Roma and Ramiro Barrera (grades 6–8), with a majority zoned to Roma Middle. Roma High School serves students in grades 9–12.

== Recreation and culture ==
Spanish is frequently spoken in the community as of 2017. Molly Hennessy-Fiske of the Los Angeles Times stated that its Fourth of July celebration is "massive", and uses it to showcase its patriotic pro-American ethos. The community also celebrates Mexican Independence Day and a December caminata. According to Hennesy-Fiske, the "vibe is more Tejano than Mexican".

The town is home to Grupo Duelo, a Mexican Norteño (regional mexican) norteño light band.

== In popular culture ==
The town is the scene identified as the burial site of artifacts from the Library at Alexandria in Clive Cussler's novel Treasure.

Filming for the 1952 film Viva Zapata!, scripted by John Steinbeck and directed by Elia Kazan, took place in Roma. The film and the city are recurring motifs in Larry McMurtry's 1972 novel All My Friends Are Going to Be Strangers, and the book's conclusion takes place in and around Roma.

== Notable people ==
- Edgar Barrera, attended Roma High School; songwriter, producer, musician
- Hector Hugo Gonzalez, nurse educator and the first Mexican-American registered nurse to earn a Ph.D. in the United States
- Jovita González de Mireles (1904–1983), Tejana folklorist, schoolteacher, and feminist writer
