= Woodson Independent School District =

School district in Texas, United States

Coordinates: 33°1′11.5″N 99°3′9.0″W

Woodson Independent School District is a public school district based in Woodson, Texas (USA).

Located in Throckmorton County, the district extends into small parts of Stephens and Young counties.

== History ==
The district changed to a four day school week in fall 2019.

== Academic achievement ==
In 2009, the school district was rated "academically acceptable" by the Texas Education Agency.

== Special programs ==
=== Athletics ===
Woodson High School plays six-man football.

== See also ==
- List of school districts in Texas
- List of high schools in Texas
