= Fort Belknap (Texas) =

- U.S. National Register of Historic Places
- U.S. National Historic Landmark
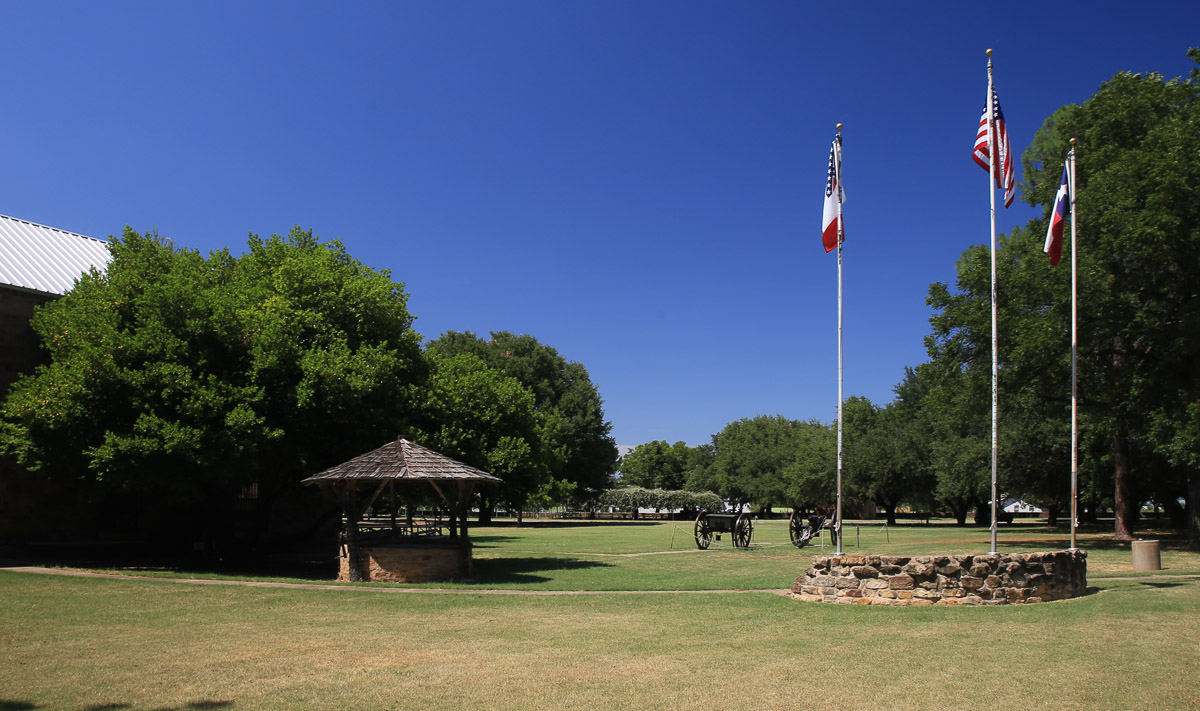
- Flags and artillery at Fort Belknap.

- Location within Texas Location within the United States
- Nearest city: Newcastle, Texas
- Coordinates: 33°9′2.79″N 98°44′28.36″W
- Area: 15.3 acres (6.2 ha)
- Built: June 24, 1851
- NRHP reference No.: 66000824

Significant dates
- Added to NRHP: October 15, 1966
- Designated NHL: December 19, 1960

Fort Belknap, located near Newcastle, Texas, was established in November 1851 by brevet Brigadier General William G. Belknap to protect the Texas frontier against raids by the Kiowa and Comanche. It was the northernmost fort in a line from the Rio Grande to the Red River. The fort functioned as a base of operations rather than as a fortified point, and it became the center of a substantial network of roads, including the Butterfield Overland Mail. The fort was designated a National Historic Landmark in 1960, in recognition of its key role in securing the Texas frontier in the 1850s and 1860s.

Other forts in the frontier fort system were Forts Griffin, Concho, Richardson, Chadbourne, Stockton, Davis, Bliss, McKavett, Clark, McIntosh, Inge, and Phantom Hill in Texas, and Sill in Oklahoma. Subposts or intermediate stations also were used, including Bothwick's Station on Salt Creek between Fort Richardson and Fort Belknap, Camp Wichita near Buffalo Springs between Fort Richardson and Red River Station, and Mountain Pass between Fort Concho and Fort Griffin.

Some notable officers who were stationed at Fort Belknap include Captain Randolph B. Marcy and Lieutenant George B. McClellan. Together, the officers explored the Canadian River and found the headwaters of the Red River. The Second Cavalry was headquartered here in 1858 under the command of Major George H. Thomas.

Prior to the outbreak of the American Civil War, the post was abandoned, partly as a pullback of federal troops to the north, and partly due to the fort's unreliable water supply. "Northern Indians fell upon the hapless Texas frontier with such violence that a whole tier of frontier counties was disbanded..." Families remaining in Young County "huddled in the abandoned buildings of Fort Belknap" and "during snow storms sought shelter in the abandoned buildings."

The fort was briefly reoccupied in 1867, then abandoned for the last time.

The fort was gradually dismantled for building materials, so that by 1936, only the magazine and part of the cornhouse remained. Beginning with the Texas Centennial, portions of the fort were rebuilt and restored, mostly on their original foundations. Starting in 2019, the fort underwent a renovation to update the museum housed in the commissary building and build a new support structure for the historic grape arbor. The arbor includes the largest mustang (muscadine) grape vine known to exist.

The fort is home to the Fort Belknap Archives, which houses records from North Texas.

== Gallery ==
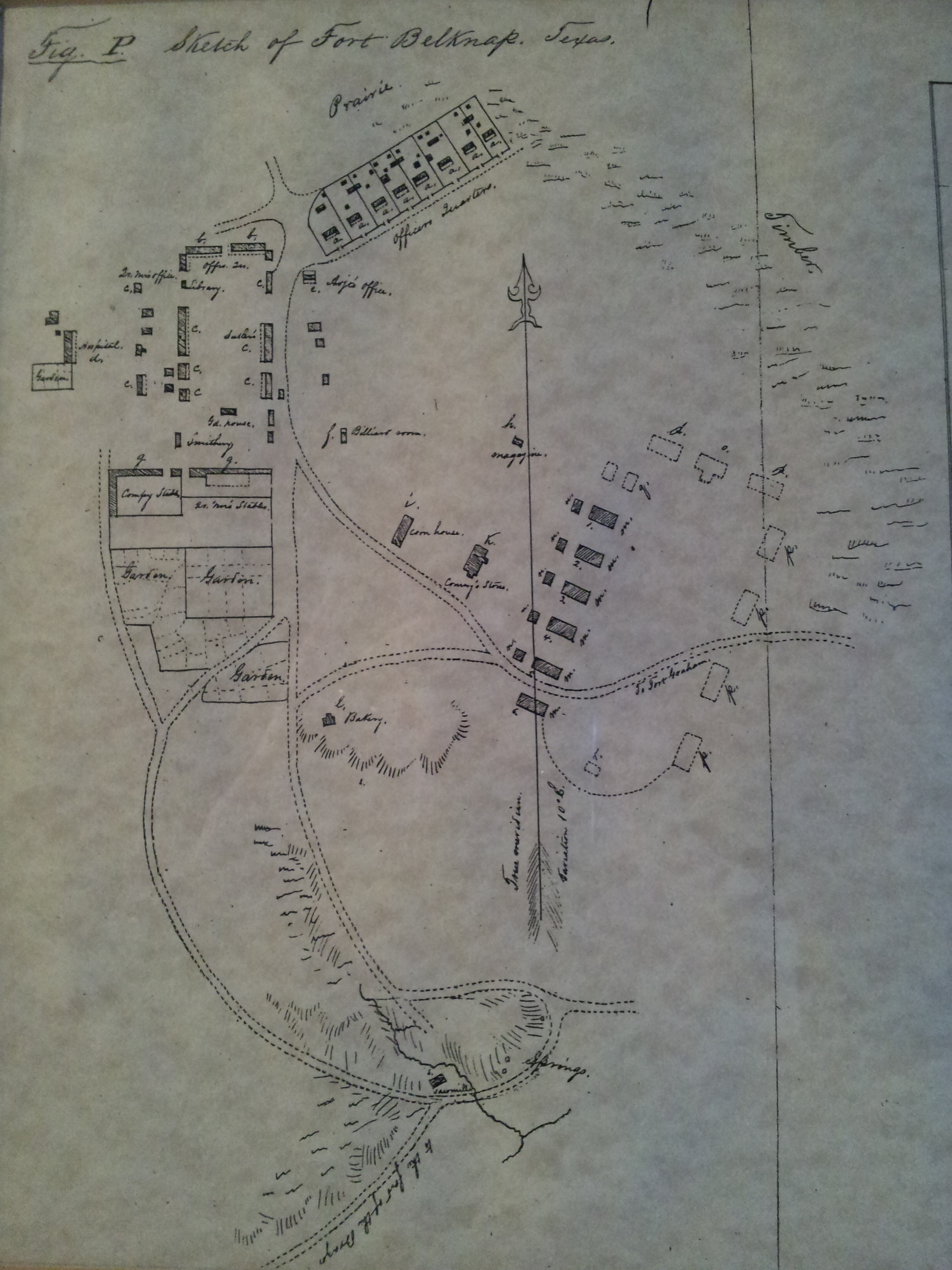
An 1853 map of the fort by Lt. Col. W.G. Freeman

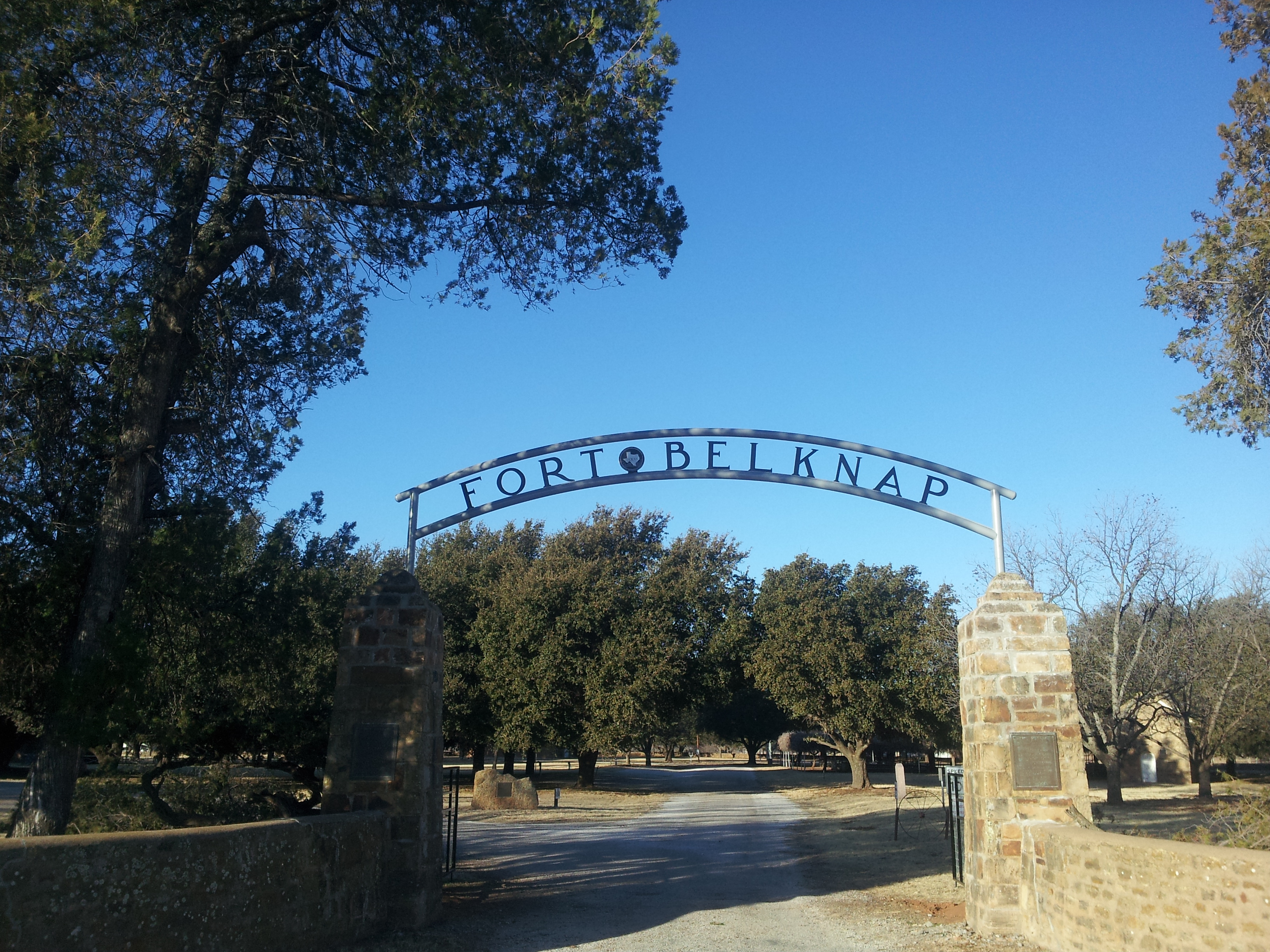
Entrance

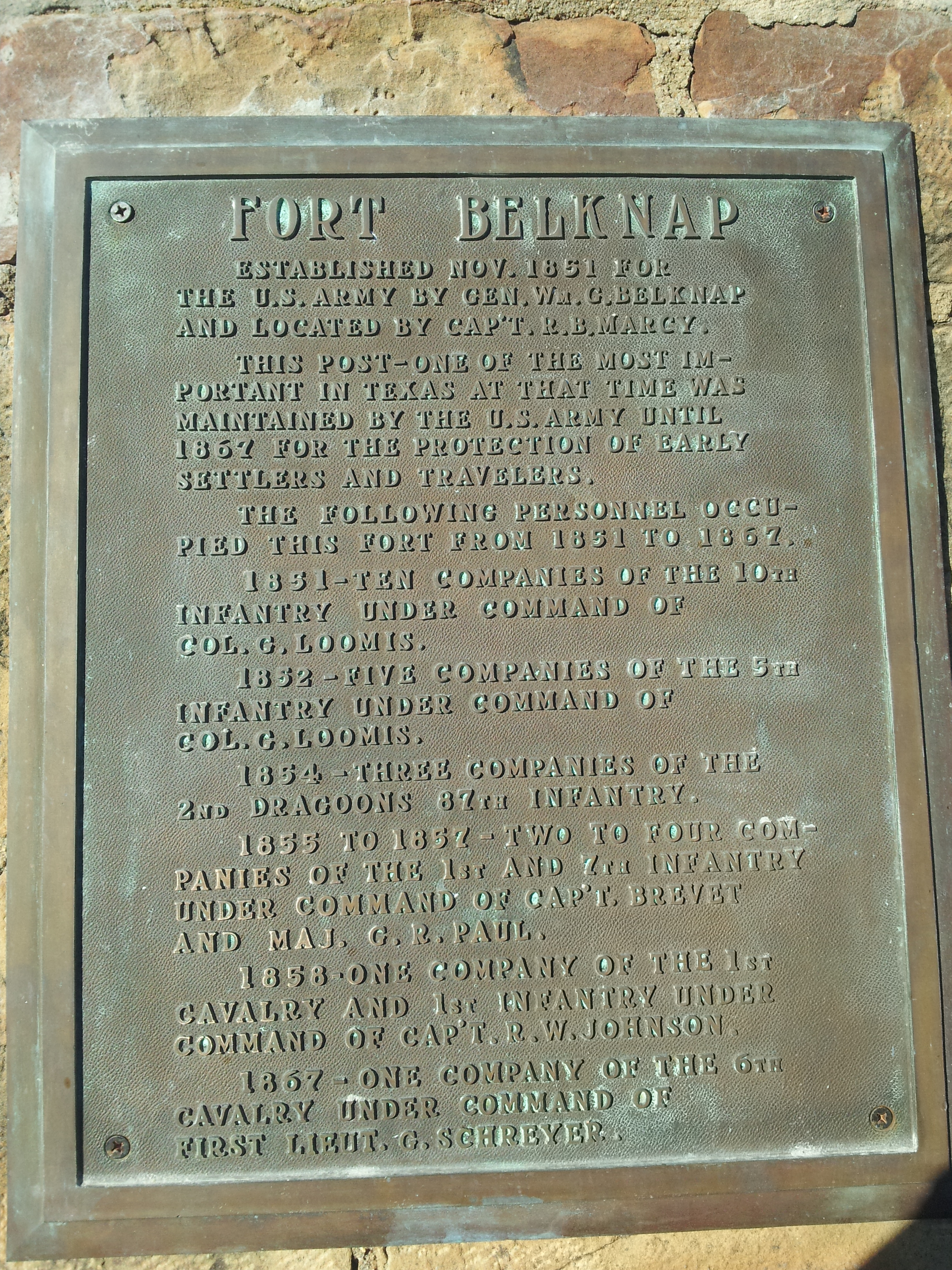
Fort Belknap historical marker

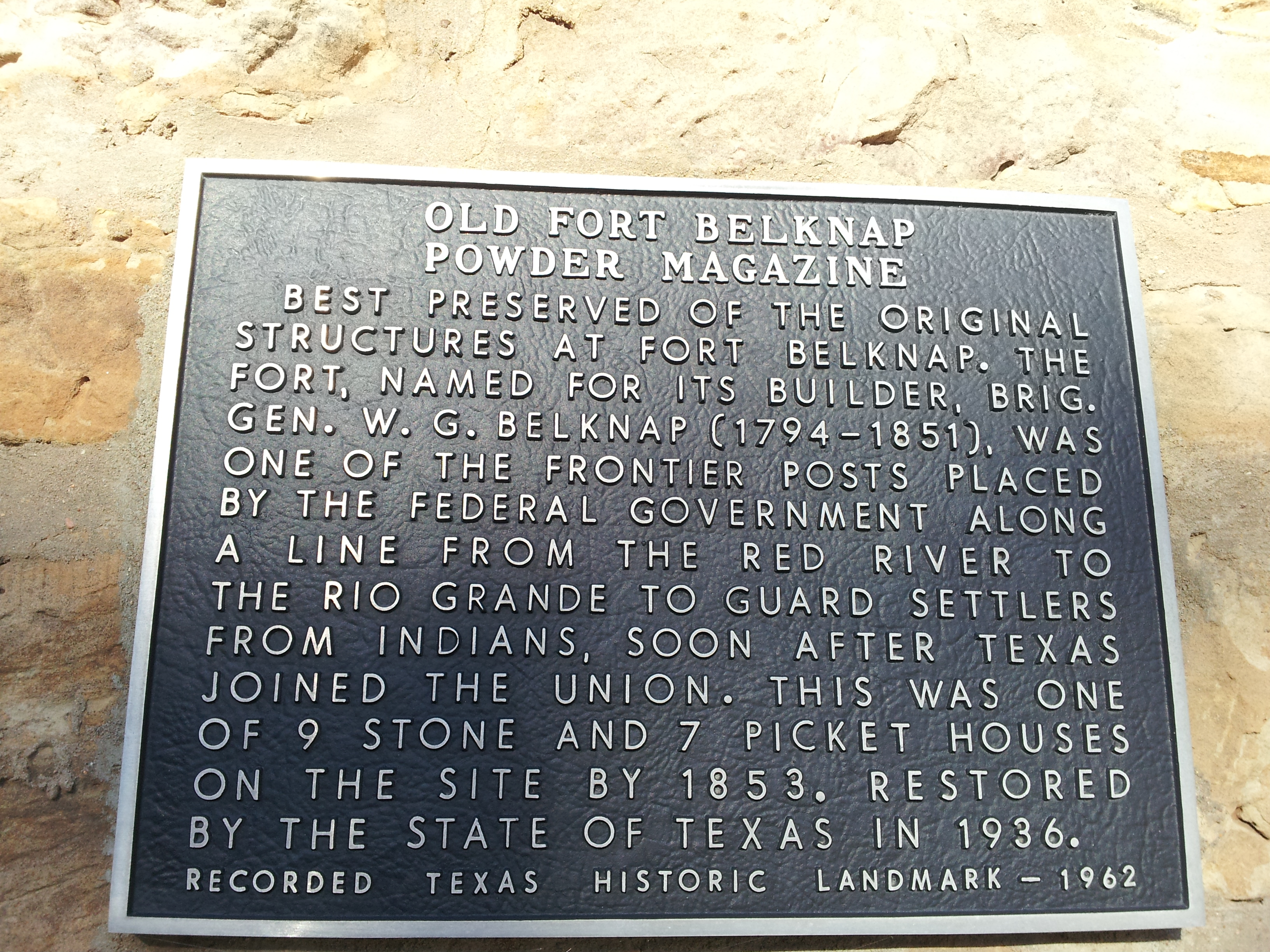
Magazine marker

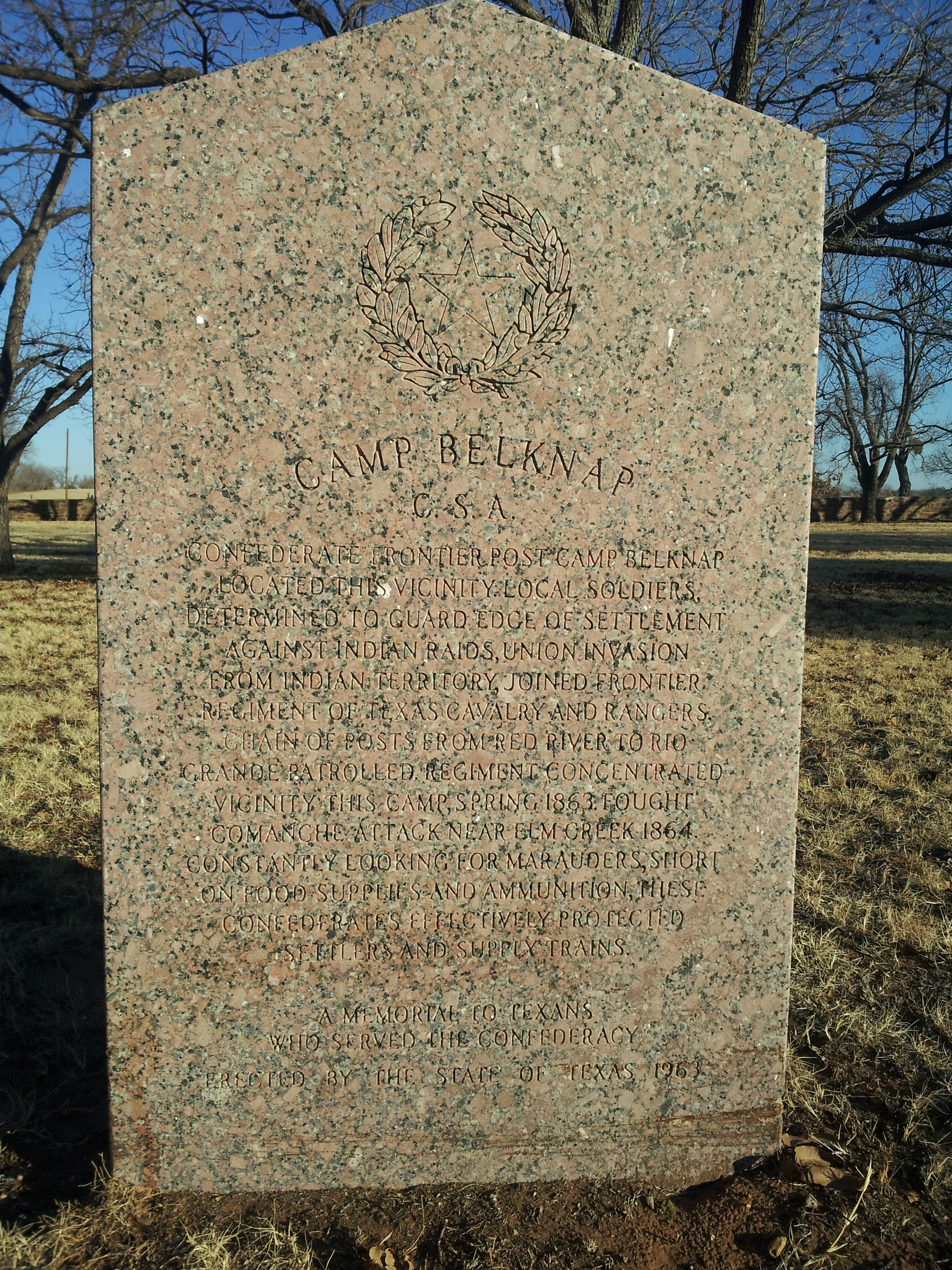
CSA marker

== See also ==
- List of National Historic Landmarks in Texas
- National Register of Historic Places listings in Young County, Texas
- Recorded Texas Historic Landmarks in Young County
- Texas Forts Trail
- Forts of Texas
