= South Bend, Texas =

Unincorporated community in Texas, US

South Bend is an unincorporated community in Young County, Texas, United States. According to the Handbook of Texas, the community had an estimated population of 140 in 2000.

== Geography ==
South Bend is located at 33°00′16″N 98°40′06″W (33.0045619, -98.6683934) in south central Young County. It is situated at the junction of State Highway 67 and FM 701.

== History ==
The area was settled in the late 1890s. The first storekeeper in the vicinity was J.N. Smith, who named the community Arkansas. When a post office was established, the name had changed to South Bend, after its location at a bend on the Clear Fork of the Brazos River. Oil discoveries in the 1920s led to a brief boom in the local economy. In 1929, an oil well drilled to 4,250 feet began flowing with 130 °F mineral water, leading to the development of Stovall Hot Wells health resort. It remained in operation through 1994, when it was destroyed in a fire. South Bend had approximately 500 residents in 1940, but soon suffered the same post war decline felt by other rural communities. By 1990, the number of inhabitants had fallen to 100. That figure rose to around 140 in 2000.

Although South Bend is unincorporated, it has a post office, with the ZIP code of 76481.

== Education ==
Public education in the community of South Bend is provided by the Graham Independent School District.
