= Young County, Texas =

County in Texas, US

- County
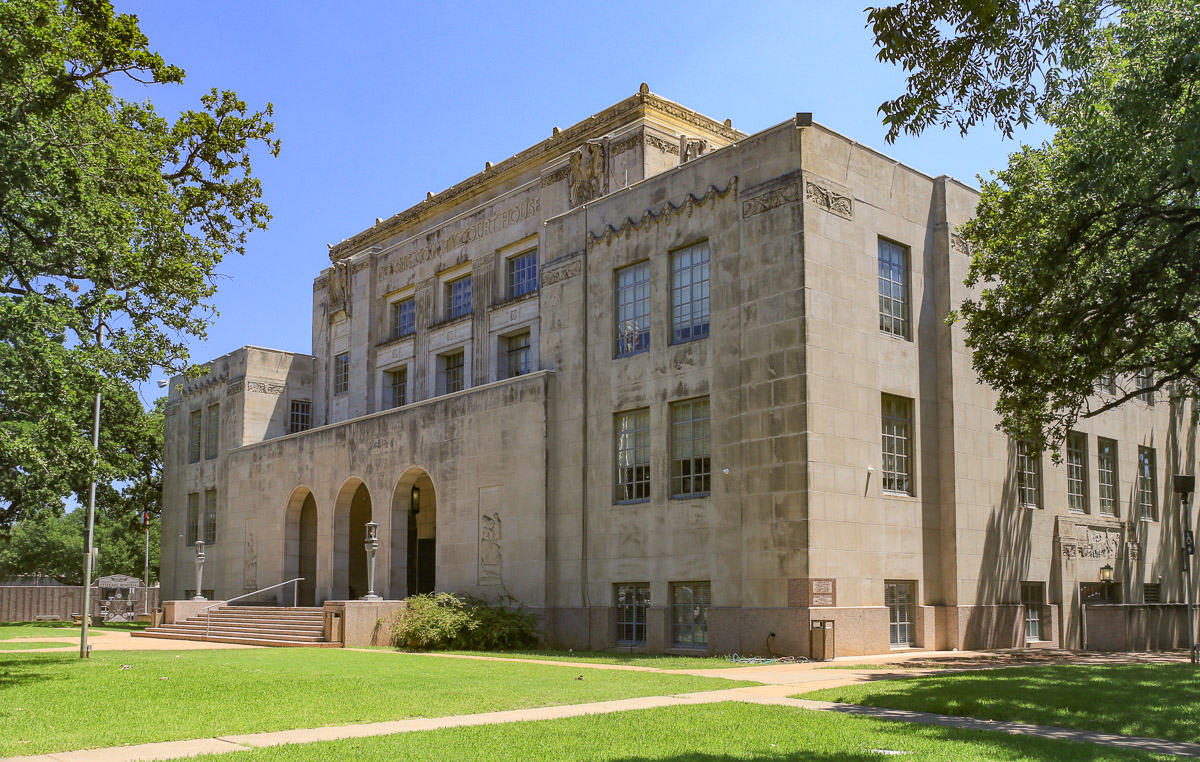
- The Young County Courthouse in Graham

- Location within the U.S. state of Texas
- Coordinates: 33°11′N 98°42′W
- Country: United States
- State: Texas
- Founded: 1874
- Named for: William Cocke Young
- Seat: Graham
- Largest city: Graham

Area
  - Total: 931 sq mi (2,410 km^{2})
  - Land: 914 sq mi (2,370 km^{2})
  - Water: 16 sq mi (41 km^{2}) 1.8%

Population (2020)
  - Total: 17,867
  - Estimate (2025): 18,154 ▲
  - Density: 19.5/sq mi (7.55/km^{2})
- Time zone: UTC−6 (Central)
  - Summer (DST): UTC−5 (CDT)
- Congressional district: 25th
- Website: www.co.young.tx.us

Young County is a county located in the U.S. state of Texas. As of the 2020 census, its population was 17,867. Its county seat is Graham. The county was created in 1856 and organized in 1874. It is named for William Cocke Young, an early Texas settler and soldier.

== History ==
=== Native Americans ===
The Brazos Indian Reservation, founded by General Randolph B. Marcy in 1854, provided a refuge from warring Comanche for the Delaware, Shawnee, Tonkawa, Wichita, Choctaw, and Caddo peoples, who had migrated into Texas from other areas. Within the reservation, each tribe had its own village and cultivated agricultural crops. Government-contracted beef cattle were delivered each week. Most settlers were unable to distinguish between reservation and non-reservation tribes, blaming the reservation Indians for the raids by the Comanche and Kiowa. A newspaper in Jacksboro, Texas, titled The White Man (or Whiteman), advocated removal of all tribes from North Texas.

During December 1858, Choctaw Tom, a Yowani married to a Hasinai woman, at times served as an interpreter to Sam Houston. He was among a group of reservation Indians who received permission to hunt outside the reservation boundaries, but on December 27, Captain Peter Garland and a vigilante group attacked Choctaw Tom's camp, indiscriminately murdering and injuring women and children along with the men.

Governor Hardin Richard Runnels ordered Major John Henry Brown of the state militia to the area, with 100 troops to control potential retaliation and unrest. An examining trial was conducted about the Choctaw Tom raid, but no indictments resulted of any militia.

In May 1859, John Baylor led a number of whites who confronted the United States troops defending the reservation, demanding the surrender of certain men from the tribe whom they thought were responsible for raids. The military balked, and Baylor retreated, but he killed an Indian woman and an old man in the process. Baylor's group was later attacked by Indians off the reservation, where the military had no authority to intervene.

In May 1871, Kiowa medicine man Satank (Sitting Bear), and Kiowa chiefs Satanta (White Bear), Addo-etta (Big Tree) and Maman-ti (Skywalker) led a force of over 100 Kiowa, Comanche, Kiowa-Apaches, Arapaho, and Cheyenne warriors from the Oklahoma Fort Sill Reservation into Texas. On May 18, the Indians attacked a wagon train belonging to Henry Warren, killing all but five who escaped. Commanding General of the United States Army William Tecumseh Sherman personally arrested Satank, Satanta, and Big Tree at Fort Sill and had them tried in civil court in Jacksboro. Satank was killed in an attempted escape, and others were found guilty and sentenced to hang. Their sentences were commuted by Governor Edmund J. Davis at the request of a group of Quakers, and they were later paroled. The incident was a key element that contributed to the Red River War.

=== Explorers and settlers ===
Spanish Colonel Diego Ortiz Parrilla travelled through the county en route to during the 1759 Red River Campaign. Pedro Vial came through the region in 1789 while charting the Santa Fe Trail.

The county was included in the 1841 Republic of Texas empresario Peters Colony land grant. The Young County portion of the grant remained unsettled until the 1850s.

In 1851, Bvt. Brig. Gen. William G. Belknap founded the United States Army Fort Belknap. The fort was surrendered to the Confederacy in 1861, and reoccupied by federal troops in 1867. John and Will Peveler established a ranch 2 mi (3.2 km) near Fort Belknap, becoming the first settlers.

=== County established ===
Young County was established by the Texas Legislature in 1856 from Bosque and Fannin Counties and organized later that same year. Belknap became the county seat. Many of the citizens abandoned the area during the American Civil War due to Indian depredations. In 1865, the county's government was dissolved, and the county records were transferred to Jacksboro. The county was reorganized in 1874, and the county records were brought back from Jacksboro. This time, the new town of Graham, platted in 1873, was chosen as the county seat.

Gustavus and Edwin Graham began the town of Graham in 1872, and opened the saltworks in 1869. An 1876 area rancher meeting in Graham, regarding cattle rustling, became the beginnings of what is now known as the Texas and Southwestern Cattle Raisers Association. In 1891, a group of investors formed the Graham Mining Company in hopes of mining gold, silver, and coal in the area.

Between 1874 and 1910, railroad lines contributed to the county economy and facilitated transportation, including the Chicago, Rock Island and Gulf Railway, the Wichita Falls and Southern, and the Gulf, Texas and Western Railroad.

Federal programs came to the assistance of farmers and ranchers during the Great Depression. The Work Projects Administration restored old Fort Belknap in 1936. In the 1930s, Young County also joined 65 other counties to form the Brazos River Conservation and Reclamation District. Oil exploration and production opened the 20th century, and had Lindy Lou No. 1 well come in. Actual production of petroleum began in 1920, and boom towns sprang up around the county. By 1990, 3,431,000 barrels (545,500 m^{3}) had been produced.

== Geography ==
According to the U.S. Census Bureau, the county has a total area of 931 square miles (2,410 km^{2}), of which 914 square miles (2,370 km^{2}) are land and 16 square miles (41 km^{2}) (1.8%) are covered by water.

=== Major highways ===
- U.S. Highway 380
- State Highway 16
- State Highway 67
- State Highway 79
- State Highway 114
- State Highway 251
- Loop 132

=== Adjacent counties ===
- Archer County (north)
- Jack County (east)
- Palo Pinto County (southeast)
- Stephens County (south)
- Throckmorton County (west)

== Demographics ==
Historical population
Census	Pop.	Note	%±
1860	592		—
1870	135		−77.2%
1880	4,726		3,400.7%
1890	5,049		6.8%
1900	6,540		29.5%
1910	13,657		108.8%
1920	13,379		−2.0%
1930	20,128		50.4%
1940	19,004		−5.6%
1950	16,810		−11.5%
1960	17,254		2.6%
1970	15,400		−10.7%
1980	19,083		23.9%
1990	18,126		−5.0%
2000	17,943		−1.0%
2010	18,550		3.4%
2020	17,867		−3.7%
2025 (est.)	18,154	▲	1.6%
U.S. Decennial Census; 1850–2010 2010 2020

=== 2020 census ===
As of the 2020 census, the county had a population of 17,867, the median age was 42.2 years, 23.6% of residents were under the age of 18, and 21.2% of residents were 65 years of age or older. For every 100 females there were 97.5 males, and for every 100 females age 18 and over there were 94.4 males.

The racial makeup of the county was 80.6% White, 1.0% Black or African American, 1.0% American Indian and Alaska Native, 0.5% Asian, <0.1% Native Hawaiian and Pacific Islander, 8.5% from some other race, and 8.4% from two or more races. Hispanic or Latino residents of any race comprised 19.6% of the population.

48.0% of residents lived in urban areas, while 52.0% lived in rural areas.

There were 7,249 households in the county, of which 29.8% had children under the age of 18 living in them. Of all households, 50.9% were married-couple households, 17.8% were households with a male householder and no spouse or partner present, and 25.7% were households with a female householder and no spouse or partner present. About 28.4% of all households were made up of individuals and 15.1% had someone living alone who was 65 years of age or older.

There were 8,539 housing units, of which 15.1% were vacant. Among occupied housing units, 71.8% were owner-occupied and 28.2% were renter-occupied. The homeowner vacancy rate was 2.0% and the rental vacancy rate was 10.0%.

=== Racial and ethnic composition ===
Young County, Texas – Racial and ethnic composition Note: the US Census treats Hispanic/Latino as an ethnic category. This table excludes Latinos from the racial categories and assigns them to a separate category. Hispanics/Latinos may be of any race.
Race / Ethnicity (NH = Non-Hispanic)	Pop 1980	Pop 1990	Pop 2000	Pop 2010	Pop 2020	% 1980	% 1990	% 2000	% 2010	% 2020
White alone (NH)	17,922	16,597	15,519	14,959	13,409	93.92%	91.56%	86.49%	80.64%	75.05%
Black or African American alone (NH)	264	260	217	220	174	1.38%	1.43%	1.21%	1.19%	0.97%
Native American or Alaska Native alone (NH)	70	53	78	83	79	0.37%	0.29%	0.43%	0.45%	0.44%
Asian alone (NH)	67	44	46	55	86	0.35%	0.24%	0.26%	0.30%	0.48%
Native Hawaiian or Pacific Islander alone (NH)	x	x	8	5	0	x	x	0.04%	0.03%	0.00%
Other race alone (NH)	0	8	7	4	38	0.00%	0.04%	0.04%	0.02%	0.21%
Mixed race or Multiracial (NH)	x	x	162	179	573	x	x	0.90%	0.96%	3.21%
Hispanic or Latino (any race)	760	1,164	1,906	3,045	3,508	3.98%	6.42%	10.62%	16.42%	19.63%
Total	19,083	18,126	17,943	18,550	17,867	100.00%	100.00%	100.00%	100.00%	100.00%

=== 2010 census ===
A Williams Institute analysis of 2010 census data found about 2.6 same-sex couples per 1,000 households were in the county.

=== 2000 census ===
As of the 2000 census, 17,943 people, 7,167 households, and 5,081 families resided in the county. The population density was 20 people per square mile (7.7 people/km^{2}). The 8,504 housing units averaged 9 units per square mile (3.5 units/km^{2}). The racial makeup of the county was 90.98% White, 1.21% Black, 0.64% Native American, 0.26% Asian, 0.04% Pacific Islander, 5.28% from other races, and 1.58% from two or more races. About 10.62% of the population was Hispanic or Latino of any race.

Of the 7,167 households, 30.80% had children under the age of 18 living with them, 58.00% were married couples living together, 9.40% had a female householder with no husband present, and 29.10% were not families. Around 26.30% of all households were made up of individuals, and 14.30% had someone living alone who was 65 years of age or older. The average household size was 2.45 and the average family size was 2.94.

In the county, the population was distributed as 25.00% under the age of 18, 7.00% from 18 to 24, 24.70% from 25 to 44, 23.60% from 45 to 64, and 19.70% who were 65 years of age or older. The median age was 41 years. For every 100 females, there were 91.60 males. For every 100 females age 18 and over, there were 86.70 males.

The median income for a household in the county was $30,499, and for a family was $36,698. Males had a median income of $30,257 versus $19,441 for females. The per capita income for the county was $16,710. About 12.00% of families and 15.70% of the population were below the poverty line, including 21.00% of those under age 18 and 12.90% of those age 65 or over.

== Politics ==
As was commonly the case in the Solid South, Young County voters at the presidential level cast their ballots predominantly for the Democratic candidate from 1912 through the 1960s, the two major exceptions being in 1952 and 1956, both of which featured native son Dwight D. Eisenhower as the Republican candidate. From 1980, the balance has shifted in favor of the GOP, a trend more pronounced since 2000.

Republican Drew Springer, a businessman from Muenster in Cooke County, has represented Young County in the Texas House of Representatives since January 2013.

Young County is located within District 68 of the Texas House of Representatives. Young County is located within District 30 of the Texas Senate.

United States presidential election results for Young County, Texas
Year	Republican		Democratic		Third party(ies)	
Year	No.	%	No.	%	No.	%
1912	35	2.95%	922	77.74%	229	19.31%
1916	71	5.12%	1,175	84.65%	142	10.23%
1920	209	14.22%	1,214	82.59%	47	3.20%
1924	322	13.57%	2,000	84.28%	51	2.15%
1928	1,826	58.88%	1,275	41.12%	0	0.00%
1932	320	9.19%	3,156	90.64%	6	0.17%
1936	304	8.99%	3,065	90.65%	12	0.35%
1940	478	11.39%	3,712	88.49%	5	0.12%
1944	327	7.95%	3,183	77.37%	604	14.68%
1948	516	13.24%	3,175	81.45%	207	5.31%
1952	2,649	51.02%	2,536	48.84%	7	0.13%
1956	2,083	50.44%	2,028	49.10%	19	0.46%
1960	2,067	45.84%	2,419	53.65%	23	0.51%
1964	1,600	32.03%	3,395	67.95%	1	0.02%
1968	1,860	34.79%	2,482	46.43%	1,004	18.78%
1972	3,353	69.28%	1,486	30.70%	1	0.02%
1976	2,652	43.01%	3,473	56.33%	41	0.66%
1980	4,153	59.14%	2,740	39.02%	129	1.84%
1984	5,282	70.40%	2,203	29.36%	18	0.24%
1988	4,156	57.78%	3,007	41.80%	30	0.42%
1992	2,894	37.71%	2,464	32.10%	2,317	30.19%
1996	3,647	54.46%	2,394	35.75%	656	9.80%
2000	5,022	72.22%	1,843	26.50%	89	1.28%
2004	5,874	79.28%	1,511	20.39%	24	0.32%
2008	5,942	81.34%	1,303	17.84%	60	0.82%
2012	6,225	85.09%	992	13.56%	99	1.35%
2016	6,601	85.65%	876	11.37%	230	2.98%
2020	7,110	86.30%	1,034	12.55%	95	1.15%
2024	7,298	87.78%	962	11.57%	54	0.65%

United States Senate election results for Young County, Texas1
Year	Republican		Democratic		Third party(ies)	
Year	No.	%	No.	%	No.	%
2024	7,088	85.70%	1,063	12.85%	120	1.45%

United States Senate election results for Young County, Texas2
Year	Republican		Democratic		Third party(ies)	
Year	No.	%	No.	%	No.	%
2020	6,996	86.27%	967	11.93%	146	1.80%

Texas Gubernatorial election results for Young County
Year	Republican		Democratic		Third party(ies)	
Year	No.	%	No.	%	No.	%
2022	5,498	88.76%	630	10.17%	66	1.07%

== Communities ==
=== Cities ===
- Graham (county seat)
- Newcastle
- Olney

=== Census-designated place ===
- Loving

=== Unincorporated communities ===
- Eliasville
- Fort Belknap
- Markley
- Murray
- South Bend

== Education ==
School districts serving sections of the county include:

- Bryson Independent School District
- Graham Independent School District
- Newcastle Independent School District
- Olney Independent School District
- Woodson Independent School District

Formerly Megargel Independent School District served a portion of the county. In 2006 Megargel schools closed.

Most of Young County is in the service area for Ranger Junior College. Areas in Graham ISD are in the boundary for North Central Texas College.

== See also ==
- List of museums in North Texas
- National Register of Historic Places listings in Young County, Texas
- Recorded Texas Historic Landmarks in Young County
