= Newcastle, Texas =

- City
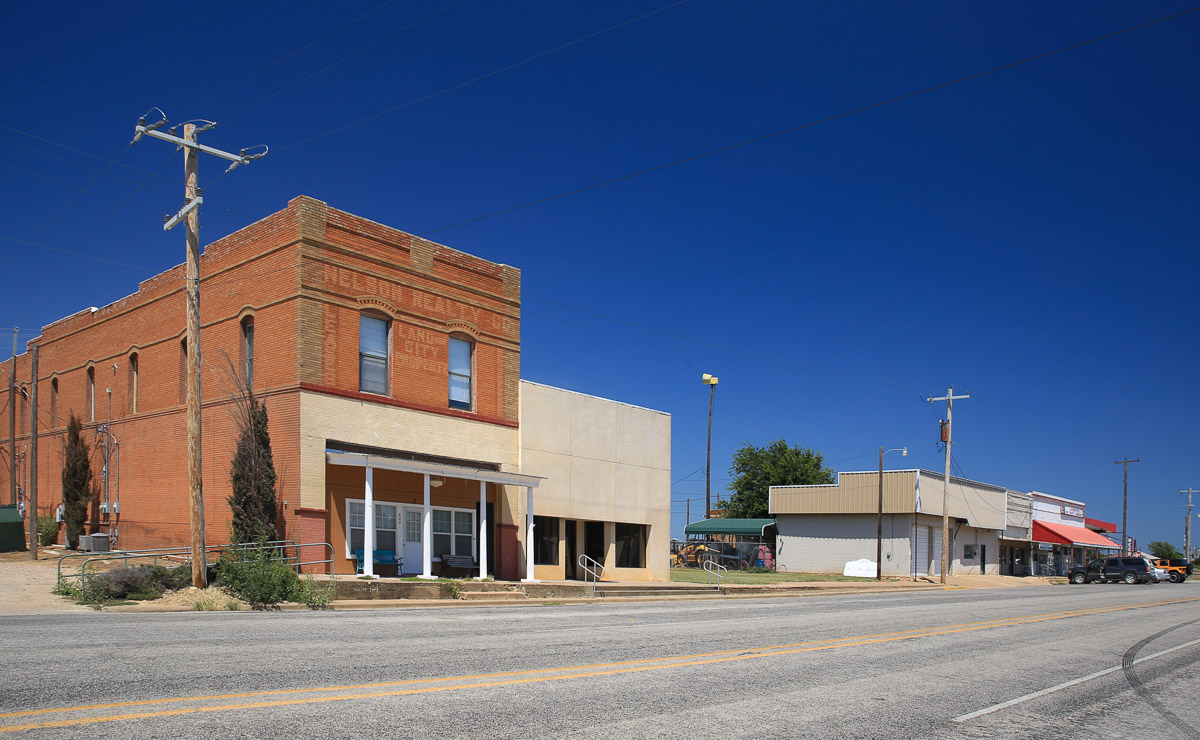
- Downtown Newcastle.

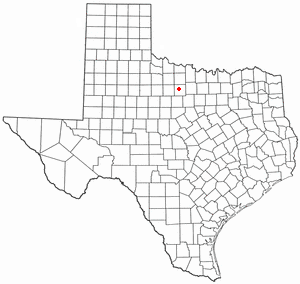
- Location of Newcastle, Texas

- Coordinates: 33°11′45″N 98°44′56″W
- Country: United States
- State: Texas
- County: Young

Area
  - Total: 1.80 sq mi (4.67 km^{2})
  - Land: 1.79 sq mi (4.64 km^{2})
  - Water: 0.012 sq mi (0.03 km^{2})
- Elevation: 1,125 ft (343 m)

Population (2020)
  - Total: 526
  - Density: 294/sq mi (113/km^{2})
- Time zone: UTC-6 (Central (CST))
  - Summer (DST): UTC-5 (CDT)
- ZIP code: 76372
- Area code: 940
- FIPS code: 48-50868
- GNIS feature ID: 2411242
- Website: newcastletexas.com

Newcastle is a city in Young County, Texas, United States. Following the beginning of coal mining in 1908, the town was established and named after the English coal town, Newcastle upon Tyne. Coal mining had ended by 1942. Its population was 526 at the 2020 census.

== Geography ==
According to the United States Census Bureau, the city has a total area of 1.8 sq mi (4.7 km^{2}), all land.

== Demographics ==
Historical population
Census	Pop.	Note	%±
1920	1,452		—
1930	1,157		−20.3%
1940	1,044		−9.8%
1950	743		−28.8%
1960	617		−17.0%
1970	624		1.1%
1980	688		10.3%
1990	505		−26.6%
2000	575		13.9%
2010	585		1.7%
2020	526		−10.1%
U.S. Decennial Census

=== 2020 census ===
As of the 2020 census, there were 526 people and 147 families residing in Newcastle. The median age was 37.7 years.

27.0% of residents were under the age of 18, and 19.0% were 65 years of age or older. For every 100 females there were 104.7 males, and for every 100 females age 18 and over there were 93.9 males age 18 and over.

0.0% of residents lived in urban areas, while 100.0% lived in rural areas.

There were 218 households in Newcastle, of which 33.9% had children under the age of 18 living in them. Of all households, 36.2% were married-couple households, 24.3% were households with a male householder and no spouse or partner present, and 28.9% were households with a female householder and no spouse or partner present. About 30.3% of all households were made up of individuals and 16.5% had someone living alone who was 65 years of age or older.

There were 275 housing units, of which 20.7% were vacant. The homeowner vacancy rate was 3.1% and the rental vacancy rate was 4.2%.

Racial composition as of the 2020 census
Race	Number	Percent
White	437	83.1%
Black or African American	3	0.6%
American Indian and Alaska Native	6	1.1%
Asian	0	0.0%
Native Hawaiian and Other Pacific Islander	0	0.0%
Some other race	30	5.7%
Two or more races	50	9.5%
Hispanic or Latino (of any race)	68	12.9%

=== 2000 census ===
As of the census of 2000, 575 people, 233 households, and 157 families resided in the city. The population density was 317.5 inhabitants per square mile (122.6/km^{2}). The 266 housing units averaged 146.9 per square mile (56.7/km^{2}). The racial makeup of the city was 93.91% White, 1.39% African American, 1.04% Native American, 2.26% from other races, and 1.39% from two or more races. Hispanics or Latinos of any race were 5.57% of the population.

Of the 233 households, 31.3% had children under the age of 18 living with them, 50.2% were married couples living together, 12.9% had a female householder with no husband present, and 32.6% were not families. About 28.3% of all households were made up of individuals, and 15.0% had someone living alone who was 65 years of age or older. The average household size was 2.47 and the average family size was 3.03.

In the city, the age distribution was 26.4% under 18, 7.0% from 18 to 24, 28.9% from 25 to 44, 21.7% from 45 to 64, and 16.0% who were 65 or older. The median age was 37 years. For every 100 females, there were 99.0 males. For every 100 females age 18 and over, there were 90.5 males.

The median income for a household in the city was $24,485, and for a family was $27,500. Males had a median income of $28,125 versus $20,417 for females. The per capita income for the city was $15,004. About 16.1% of families and 18.1% of the population were below the poverty line, including 24.6% of those under age 18 and 4.2% of those age 65 or over.

== Education ==
The City of Newcastle is served by the Newcastle Independent School District.

== Infrastructure ==
Newcastle Volunteer Fire Department services the community.
