= List of Baylor Bears men's basketball head coaches =

The following is a list of Baylor Bears men's basketball head coaches. The Bears have had 17 coaches in their 117-season history.

Baylor's current head coach is Scott Drew. He was hired in August 2003 to replace Dave Bliss, who resigned amidst the investigation into the Baylor University basketball scandal.

No.	Tenure	Coach	Years	Record	Pct.
1	1906–1908	Luther Burleson	2	10–9	.526
2	1908–1910	Enoch J. Mills	2	19–10	.655
3	1910–1913	Ralph Glaze	3	26–7	.788
4	1913–1914	Norman C. Paine	1	1–8	.111
5	1914–1920	Charles Mosley	6	28–68	.292
6	1920–1926	Frank Bridges	6	51–78	.395
7	1926–1941	Ralph Wolf	15	151–126	.545
8	1941–1943; 1945–1961 (Note: Van Sweet left Baylor 11 games into the 1944–45 season. Bill Henderson coached the team for the final six games.)	Bill Henderson	19	201–239	.457
9	1943–1945	Van Sweet	2	6–23	.207
10	1961–1973	Bill Menefee	12	149–144	.509
11	1973–1977 (Note: Carroll Dawson quit his position 15 games into the 1976–77 season. Jim Haller coached the team for the final 13 games.)	Carroll Dawson	4	42–51	.452
12	1977–1985	Jim Haller	9	104–130	.444
13	1985–1992	Gene Iba	7	98–106	.480
14	1992–1994	Darrel Johnson	2	32–22	.593
15	1994–1999	Harry Miller	5	56–87	.392
16	1999–2003	Dave Bliss	4	61–57	.517
17	2003–present	Scott Drew	19	420–233	.643
Totals		17 coaches	117 seasons	1,458–1,398	.511
Records updated through end of 2022–23 season Source
