= List of Baylor Bears men's basketball seasons =

This is a list of seasons completed by the Baylor Bears men's college basketball team since its inception in 1912. The list documents season-by-season records, conference standings, NCAA appearances, and championships won.

Baylor belonged to the Southwest Conference from 1915–1995 before joining the Big 12 Conference in 1996. The team has seven regular-season conference championships, six NIT appearances, and seventeen NCAA tournament appearances.

== Key ==
National Champions	Conference Tournament Champions	Conference Regular Season Champions	Regular Season and Conference Tournament Champions

== Season-by-season results ==
Statistics overview
Season	Coach	Overall	Conference	Standing	Postseason
Luther Burleson (Independent) (1906–1908)
1906–07	Luther Burleson	5–6	—	—	
1907–08	Luther Burleson	5–3	—	—	
Luther Burleson:		10–9			
Enoch Mills (Independent) (1908–1910)
1908–09	Enoch Mills	11–5	—	—	
1909–10	Enoch Mills	8–5	—	—	
Enoch Mills:		19–10			
Ralph Glaze (Independent) (1910–1913)
1910–11	Ralph Glaze	8–3	—	—	
1911–12	Ralph Glaze	13–0	—	—	
1912–13	Ralph Glaze	5–4	—	—	
Ralph Glaze:		26–7			
Norman Paine (Independent) (1913–1914)
1913–14	Norman Paine	1–8	—	—	
Norman Paine:		1–8			
Charles (Bubbs) Moseley (Southwest Conference) (1914–1920)
1914–15	Charles Moseley	1–19	0–8	5th	
1915–16	Charles Moseley	8–9	0–8	5th	
1916–17	Charles Moseley	7–10	0–6	3rd	
1917–18	Charles Moseley	2–15	2–7	4th	
1918–19	Charles Moseley	2–9	2–8	T–4th	
1919–20	Charles Moseley	8–13	2–5	6th	
Charles (Bubbs) Moseley:		28–75	6–42		
Frank Bridges (Southwest Conference) (1920–1926)
1920–21	Frank Bridges	13–11	8–4	2nd	
1921–22	Frank Bridges	10–8	8–8	3rd	
1922–23	Frank Bridges	7–16	7–13	3rd	
1923–24	Frank Bridges	11–23	7–17	6th	
1924–25	Frank Bridges	3–12	2–12	T–7th	
1925–26	Frank Bridges	8–7	5–7	5th	
Frank Bridges:		52–77	37–61		
Ralph Wolf (Southwest Conference) (1926–1941)
1926–27	Ralph Wolf	8–4^{[Note A]}	0–3	T–6th	
1927–28	Ralph Wolf	8–10	2–8	6th	
1928–29	Ralph Wolf	7–9	2–8	6th	
1929–30	Ralph Wolf	10–6	4–6	T–4th	
1930–31	Ralph Wolf	12–8	7–5	T–3rd	
1931–32	Ralph Wolf	14–4	10–2	1st	
1932–33	Ralph Wolf	4–13	1–11	7th	
1933–34	Ralph Wolf	8–10	2–10	7th	
1934–35	Ralph Wolf	8–9	4–8	T–5th	
1935–36	Ralph Wolf	12–13	6–6	4th	
1936–37	Ralph Wolf	11–9	6–6	4th	
1937–38	Ralph Wolf	10–6	9–3	2nd	
1938–39	Ralph Wolf	14–7	7–5	4th	
1939–40	Ralph Wolf	12–9	7–5	3rd	
1940–41	Ralph Wolf	10–12	6–6	T–4th	
Ralph Wolf:		148–129	24–48		
Bill Henderson (Southwest Conference) (1941–1943)
1941–42	Bill Henderson	11–9	6–6	T–3rd	
1942–43	Bill Henderson	6–14	3–9	7th	
Bill Henderson:		17–23	9–15		
Van Sweet (Southwest Conference) (1943–1945)
1943–44	Van Sweet	6–12	2–10	6th	
1944–45	Van Sweet; Jeff Mangold	0–17^{[Note B]}	0–12^{[Note B]}	7th	
Van Sweet:		6–23	2–16		
Bill Henderson (Southwest Conference) (1945–1961)
1945–46	Bill Henderson	25–5	11–1	1st	NCAA Elite Eight
1946–47	Bill Henderson	11–11	6–6	4th	
1947–48	Bill Henderson	24–8	11–1	1st	NCAA Runner–up
1948–49	Bill Henderson	14–10	9–3	T–1st	
1949–50	Bill Henderson	14–13	8–4	T–1st	NCAA Final Four
1950–51	Bill Henderson	8–16	3–9	6th	
1951–52	Bill Henderson	6–18	5–7	T–3rd	
1952–53	Bill Henderson	10–11	6–6	4th	
1953–54	Bill Henderson	12–11	6–6	T–3rd	
1954–55	Bill Henderson	13–11	7–5	4th	
1955–56	Bill Henderson	6–17	3–9	T–5th	
1956–57	Bill Henderson	9–15	6–6	T–3rd	
1957–58	Bill Henderson	5–19	3–11	8th	
1958–59	Bill Henderson	11–13	7–7	4th	
1959–60	Bill Henderson	12–12	6–8	6th	
1960–61	Bill Henderson	4–20	2–12	8th	
Bill Henderson:		184–210	99–107		
Bill Menefee (Southwest Conference) (1961–1973)
1961–62	Bill Menefee	4–20	1–13	8th	
1962–63	Bill Menefee	7–17	4–10	7th	
1963–64	Bill Menefee	7–17	2–12	7th	
1964–65	Bill Menefee	15–9	8–6	3rd	
1965–66	Bill Menefee	8–16	6–8	T–6th	
1966–67	Bill Menefee	14–10	8–6	T–2nd	
1967–68	Bill Menefee	15–9	8–6	T–2nd	
1968–69	Bill Menefee	18–6	10–4	2nd	
1969–70	Bill Menefee	15–9	8–6	T–3rd	
1970–71	Bill Menefee	18–8	10–4	2nd	
1971–72	Bill Menefee	14–12	4–10	7th	
1972–73	Bill Menefee	14–11	8–6	4th	
Bill Menefee:		149–144	239–158		
Carroll Dawson (Southwest Conference) (1973–1977)
1973–74	Carroll Dawson	12–13	5–9	T–6th	
1974–75	Carroll Dawson	10–16	6–8	T–4th	
1975–76	Carroll Dawson	12–15	8–8	5th	
1976–77	Carroll Dawson; Jim Haller	11–17^{[Note C]}	5–11^{[Note C]}	7th	
Carroll Dawson:		44–51	22–28		
Jim Haller (Southwest Conference) (1978–1985)
1977–78	Jim Haller	14–13	8–8	5th	
1978–79	Jim Haller	16–12	9–7	T–4th	
1979–80	Jim Haller	11–16	6–10	7th	
1980–81	Jim Haller	15–12	10–6	T–2nd	
1981–82	Jim Haller	17–11	9–7	T–4th	
1982–83	Jim Haller	12–16	4–12	7th	
1983–84	Jim Haller	5–23	1–15	9th	
1984–85	Jim Haller	11–17	4–12	8th	
Jim Haller:		102–130	51–77		
Gene Iba (Southwest Conference) (1985–1992)
1985–86	Gene Iba	11–16	3–13	9th	
1986–87	Gene Iba	18–13	10–6	2nd	NIT First Round
1987–88	Gene Iba	23–11	11–5	T–2nd	NCAA Division I First Round
1988–89	Gene Iba	5–22	1–15	9th	
1989–90	Gene Iba	16–14	7–9	5th	NIT First Round
1990–91	Gene Iba	12–15	4–12	T–7th	
1991–92	Gene Iba	13–15	5–9	6th	
Gene Iba:		98–106	41–69		
Darrell Johnson (Southwest Conference) (1992–1994)
1992–93	Darrell Johnson	16–11	7–7	4th	
1993–94	Darrell Johnson	16–11	7–7	4th	
Darrell Johnson:		32–22	14–14		
Harry Miller (Southwest Conference) (1994–1996)
1994–95	Harry Miller	9–19	3–11	T–7th	
1995–96	Harry Miller	9–18	4–10	6th	
Harry Miller (Big 12 Conference) (1996–1999)
1996–97	Harry Miller	18–12	6–10	9th	
1997–98	Harry Miller	14–14	8–8	T–5th	
1998–99	Harry Miller	6–24	0–16	12th	
Harry Miller:		56–87	21–55		
Dave Bliss (Big 12 Conference) (1999–2003)
1999–00	Dave Bliss	14–15	4–12	T–8th	
2000–01	Dave Bliss	19–12	6–10	T–10th	NIT First Round
2001–02	Dave Bliss	14–16	4–12	T–10th	
2002–03	Dave Bliss	14–14	5–11	T–10th	
Dave Bliss:		61–57	19–45		
Scott Drew (Big 12 Conference) (2003–present)
2003–04	Scott Drew	8–21	3–13	11th	
2004–05	Scott Drew	9–19	1–15	12th	
2005–06	Scott Drew	4–13	4–12	12th	
2006–07	Scott Drew	15–16	4–12	11th	
2007–08	Scott Drew	21–11	9–7	T–4th	NCAA Division I First Round
2008–09	Scott Drew	24–15	5–11	9th	NIT Runner–up
2009–10	Scott Drew	28–8	11–5	T–2nd	NCAA Division I Elite Eight
2010–11	Scott Drew	18–13	7–9	T–7th	
2011–12	Scott Drew	30–8	12–6	T–3rd	NCAA Division I Elite Eight
2012–13	Scott Drew	23–14	9–9	6th	NIT Champion
2013–14	Scott Drew	26–12	9–9	6th	NCAA Division I Sweet Sixteen
2014–15	Scott Drew	24–10	11–7	T–4th	NCAA Division I First Round
2015–16	Scott Drew	22–12	10–8	T–5th	NCAA Division I First Round
2016–17	Scott Drew	27–8	12–6	T–2nd	NCAA Division I Sweet Sixteen
2017–18	Scott Drew	19–15	8–10	T–6th	NIT Second Round
2018–19	Scott Drew	20–14	10–8	4th	NCAA Division I Second Round
2019–20	Scott Drew	26–4	15–3	2nd	No postseason held
2020–21	Scott Drew	28–2	13–1	1st	NCAA Division I Champion
2021–22	Scott Drew	27–7	14–4	T–1st	NCAA Division I Second Round
2022–23	Scott Drew	23–10	11–7	T–3rd	NCAA Division I Second Round
2023–24	Scott Drew	24–11	10–8	T–3rd	NCAA Division I Second Round
2024–25	Scott Drew	20–15	10–10	T–7th	NCAA Division I Second Round
Scott Drew:		466–259 (.643)	199–183 (.521)		
Total:		1476–1412 (.511)			

^A. Season cancelled after Round Rock train disaster.
^B. Van Sweet went 0–11 and Jeff Mangold went 0–6 as head coaches, respectively.
^C. Carroll Dawson went 10–7 and Jim Haller went 1–10 as head coaches, respectively.
