= 1907–08 Baylor Bears basketball team =

American college basketball season

1907–08 Baylor Bears men's basketball
- Conference: Independent
- Record: 5-3 (5-3 Independent)
- Head coach: Luther Burleson

The 1907-08 Baylor Bears basketball team represented the Baylor University during the 1907-08 college men's basketball season.

== Schedule ==
Date time, TV	Opponent	Result	Record	Site city, state
	Waco YMCA	W 55-23	1-0	Waco, TX
	Fort Worth YMCA	W 43-23	2-0	Waco, TX
	Decatur College	W 26-22	3-0	Waco, TX
	Poly College	W 20-10	4-0	Waco, TX
	Fort Worth YMCA	L 25-49	4-1	Waco, TX
	Decatur College	L 24-36	4-2	Waco, TX
	Allen Academy	W 34-16	5-2	Waco, TX
	Fort Worth YMCA	L 25-35	5-3	Waco, TX
*Non-conference game. (#) Tournament seedings in parentheses.
