= Michael Lang =

Michael or Mike Lang may refer to:

- Michael Lang (producer) (1944–2022), American music producer
- Michael Lang (footballer, born 1991), Swiss football defender
- Michael Lang (footballer, born 1998), Austrian football defender
- Michael Lang (musician) (born 1941), American pianist and composer
- Michael J. Lang, Canadian private equity investor
- Mike Lang (film executive), former CEO of Miramax Films
- Mike Lang (Texas politician) (born 1962), Republican member of the Texas House of Representatives
- Mike Lang (Montana politician), Republican member of the Montana House of Representatives

== See also ==
- Michael Lange (born 1950), American director and producer
- Mike Lange (born 1948), radio broadcaster
