= MCISD =

MCISD may refer to one of the following school districts:

- McCamey Independent School District
- McMullen County Independent School District
- Mirando City Independent School District
- Mission Consolidated Independent School District
- Monroe County Intermediate School District
- Munday Consolidated Independent School District
