= Glenn Rogers (politician) =

American rancher and politician (born 1956)

Member of the Texas House of Representatives from the 60th district
- In office January 12, 2021 – January 14, 2025
- Preceded by: Mike Lang
- Succeeded by: Mike Olcott

Personal details
- Born: Glenn Moss Rogers; January 24, 1956 (age 70)
- Party: Republican
- Spouse: Mandy Moody
- Children: 5
- Education: Texas A&M University (BS, D.V.M.); Kansas State University (MS)
- Occupation: Veterinarian
- Website: rogersfortexas.com

Glenn Moss Rogers (born January 24, 1956) is an American veterinarian, rancher and politician who represented the 60th district in the Texas House of Representatives from 2021 to 2025. A member of the Republican Party, Rogers also owns and operates the Holt River Ranch near Graford, Texas.

== Early life, education, and career ==
Rogers graduated from Graham High School. He then attended Texas A&M University, where he received a BS and then D.V.M. from the College of Veterinary Medicine & Biomedical Sciences in 1980. After college he opened up a rural mixed veterinary practice in Graham and Graford, Texas. During this time, Rogers served as president of the Palo Pinto County Farm Bureau and as a school board member for Graham Independent School District. In the 1990s Rogers attended Kansas State University and earned a MS in Beef Production Medicine. He became an associate professor at North Carolina State University until 2000, when he returned to the ranch.

Rogers was awarded Conservation Rancher of the Year Award for the State of Texas in 2017.

=== Holt River Ranch ===
The ranch has been in the Rogers family since 1906, which is located near Graham, alongside the Brazos River. Glenn began ranching on the ranch in 1980 and moved his practice to the ranch in 1986. Originally referred to as River Ranch, until Glenn's son, Franklin Holt Rogers, died from an automobile accident in 1993. The ranch develops and market 800 heifer annually.

== Election ==
Rogers announced in September 2019 to run for the Texas House of Representatives District 60 seat, that was being held by Mike Lang at the time. Representative Lang announced in around the same time, that he would not seek re-election for the 87th legislature. Lang then reversed his statements two days later, which did not stop Rogers from running. Rogers defeated Jon Francis in the 2020 Republican Primary Runoff with 51% of the vote in July 2020. He ran unopposed in the November 2020 election. Governor Greg Abbott had endorsed Rogers prior to the July runoff election. Rogers also received endorsements from former governor Rick Perry and U.S. Congressman Mike Conaway as well.

In the 2024 Texas House of Representatives election, he was unseated in the primary by Mike Olcott.

Texas House of Representatives
Preceded by Mike Lang	Member of the Texas House of Representatives from the 60th district 2021–2025	Succeeded by Mike Olcott
