= John R. Cook =

American politician (born 1944)

John Rhodes Cook

Member of the Texas House of Representatives from the 60th district
- In office January 12, 1993 – January 14, 1997
- Preceded by: Brian McCall
- Succeeded by: Jim Keffer

Member of the Texas House of Representatives from the 64th district
- In office January 8, 1991 – January 12, 1993
- Preceded by: Rick Perry
- Succeeded by: Jim Horn

Personal details
- Born: June 27, 1944 (age 82)
- Education: University of Texas at Austin (BBA, JD)

John Rhodes Cook (born June 27, 1944) was an American politician who served in the Texas House of Representatives from 1991 to 1997.

He attended University of Texas at Austin earning a BBA and a JD. He was admitted to the State Bar of Texas in 1968. He was elected to the Texas House of Representatives in 1990. However, he lost reelection in 1996 to Jim Keffer.

Texas House of Representatives
Preceded by Rick Perry	Member of the Texas House of Representatives from the 64th district January 8, 1991–January 12, 1993	Succeeded by Jim Horn
Preceded by Brian McCall	Member of the Texas House of Representatives from the 60th district January 12, 1993–January 14, 1997	Succeeded by Jim Keffer
