= Texas's 60th House of Representatives district =

American legislative district

Texas's 60th State House of Representatives district
Representative
Mike Olcott; R–Graford
- Demographics: 78.0% White; 2.2% Black; 14.9% Hispanic; 1.3% Asian
- Population (2020) • Voting age: 185,732; 140,599

The 60th district of the Texas House of Representatives contains the entirety of Palo Pinto, Parker, and Stephens counties. The current representative is Mike Olcott, who was first elected in 2024.

== Members ==
- Glenn Rogers
- Mike Olcott
