= McCamey High School =

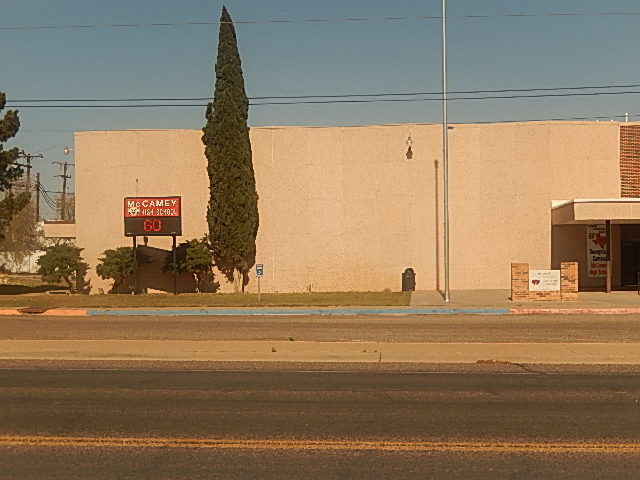

Location
- 1100 Burleson Avenue; McCamey, Texas 79752-1069; United States; 31.126140°N 102.219334°W

Information
- School type: Public high school
- School district: McCamey Independent School District
- Principal: Jay McWilliams
- Teaching staff: 14.88 (on an FTE basis)
- Grades: 9–12
- Enrollment: 144 (2024–2025)
- Student to teacher ratio: 9.68
- Colors: Orange and black
- Athletics conference: UIL Class AA
- Mascot: Badger
- Website: McCamey High School

McCamey High School is a public high school located in McCamey, Texas, United States, classified as a 2A school by the University Interscholastic League. It is part of the McCamey Independent School District located in extreme southwestern Upton County. In 2015, the school was rated "Met Standard" by the Texas Education Agency.

== Athletics ==
The McCamey Badgers compete in the following sports:

- Baseball
- Basketball
- Cross country
- Football
- Golf
- Powerlifting
- Softball
- Tennis
- Track and field
- Volleyball

=== State titles ===
- Boys' golf
  - 1955 (B), 1975 (2A)

==== State finalist ====
- Football
  - 2006 (1A/D1)
- One-act play
  - 1954 (B)

==== Sports controversy ====
In May 2023, McCamey was subject of an investigation because of a player's action during a softball game against Cisco in the post season. A video went viral of the catcher throwing balls at the batter trying to elicit an interference call.
