= George Wilde (American football) =

American football player (1923–1975)

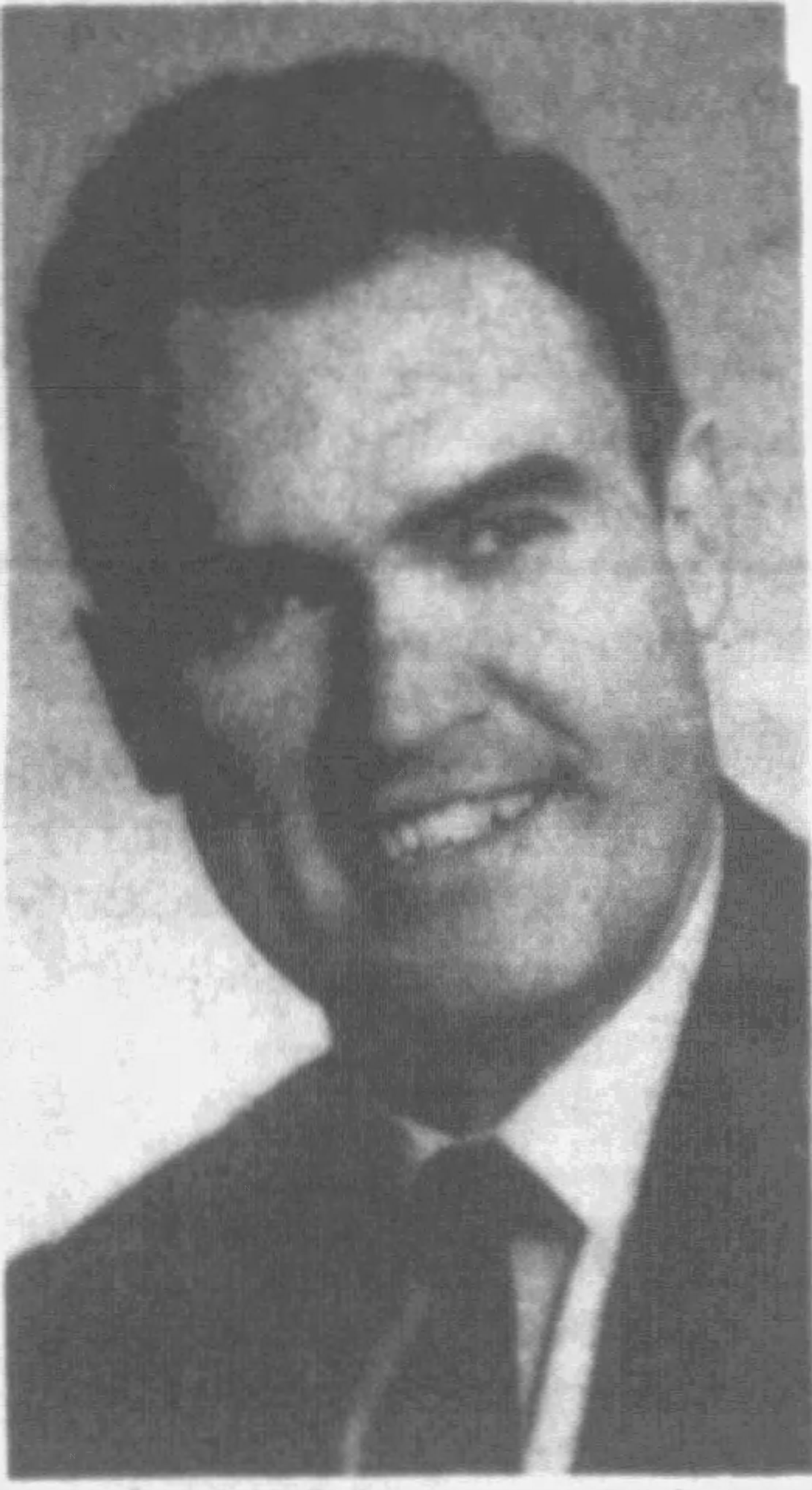

No. 29
- Positions: Halfback, defensive back

Personal information
- Born: March 16, 1923; Spring Creek, Texas, U.S.
- Died: May 26, 1975 (aged 52); Marshall, Texas, U.S.

Career information
- High school: Graham (TX)
- College: Texas A&M; Texas Christian

Career history
- Washington Redskins (1947)

Career statistics
- Games played: 9
- Receptions: 6
- Touchdowns: 1
- Stats at Pro Football Reference

George Hall Wilde (March 16, 1923 – May 26, 1975) was an American football halfback and defensive back. He appeared in nine games, one as a starter, in the National Football League (NFL) for the 1947 Washington Redskins.

Born in Spring Creek, Texas, he attended Graham High School and played college football at Texas A&M University before World War II and for Texas Christian University (TCU) after the war. He received bachelor of arts and masters degrees from TCU. He was in the United States Navy during World War II, serving from February 1943 to January 1946; he earned the Victory Medal, the Bronze Star, and the Asiatic and Pacific Philippines Liberation medals. After the war, he was a coach and teacher at Glenrose High School in Glenrose, Arkansas. He was employed by Alcoa from 1952 until his death in 1975. He died from a self-inflicted gunshot wound while parked along U.S. Highway 80 in Scottsville, Texas.
