= Graham High School (Texas) =

Public school in Texas, United States

Coordinates: 33.0963°N 98.5815°W

Location
- 1000 Brazos St. Graham, Texas 76450-3900; United States

Information
- School type: Public high school
- School district: Graham Independent School District
- Principal: Adam Anderson
- Teaching staff: 48.60 (FTE)
- Grades: 9-12
- Enrollment: 688 (2023–2024)
- Student to teacher ratio: 14.16
- Colors: Red, white and blue
- Athletics conference: UIL Class AAAA
- Mascot: Steers/Lady Blues
- Newspaper: The Stampede
- Yearbook: The Steer
- Website: ghs.grahamisd.com

Graham High School is a public high school located in Graham, Texas, United States and classified as a 4A school by the University Interscholastic League (UIL). It is part of the Graham Independent School District located in central Young County. In 2015, the school was rated "Met Standard" by the Texas Education Agency.

== Athletics ==
The Graham Steers compete in these sports:

Cross Country, Volleyball, Football, Basketball, Powerlifting, Golf, Tennis, Track, Softball, Soccer & Baseball

=== State Titles ===
- Boys Basketball -
  - 1964(3A)
- Boys Golf -
  - 1993(3A), 2008(3A)
- Girls Golf -
  - 1994(3A)

==== State Finalists ====
- Baseball -
  - 1996(3A)
- Boys Basketball -
  - 1996(3A), 2005(3A)
- Football -
  - 2009(3A/D2)
- Softball -
  - 1999(3A)

== Notable alumni ==
- Mike Dowdle, former NFL player
- Sonny Gibbs, former NFL player
- Jerry Logan, former NFL player
- George Wilde, former NFL player
- Glenn Rogers, Republican member of the Texas House of Representatives from District 60 (2021–Present)
