= Mike Olcott =

American politician

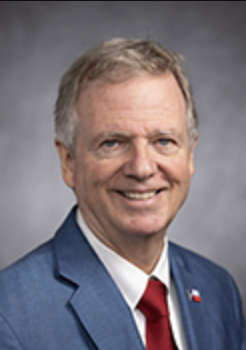

Member of the Texas House of Representatives from the 60th district
- Incumbent
- Assumed office January 14, 2025
- Preceded by: Glenn Rogers

Personal details
- Party: Republican
- Website: https://mikeolcott.com/

Mike Olcott is an American politician who was elected member of the Texas House of Representatives for the 60th district in 2024. A MAGA member of the Republican Party, he defeated Glenn Rogers in the primary election.
