= 1931–32 Baylor Bears basketball team =

American college basketball season

1931–32 Baylor Bears men's basketball

Southwest Conference champions
- Conference: Southwest Conference
- Record: 14–4 (10–2 SWC)
- Head coach: Ralph Wolf

1931–32 Southwest Conference men's basketball standings
	Conf.				Overall
Team	W		L	PCT	W		L	PCT
Baylor	10	–	2	.833	14	–	4	.778
TCU	9	–	3	.750	18	–	4	.818
Arkansas	8	–	4	.667	18	–	6	.750
Texas	5	–	7	.417	13	–	9	.591
Texas A&M	4	–	8	.333	10	–	9	.526
Rice	4	–	8	.333	5	–	9	.357
SMU	2	–	10	.167	9	–	13	.409

The 1931-32 Baylor Bears basketball team represented the Baylor University during the 1931-32 college men's basketball season.

== Schedule ==
Date time, TV	Opponent	Result	Record	Site city, state
*	North Texas	L 21-24	0-1	Waco, TX
*	North Texas	W 25-24	1-1	Waco, TX
*	Southeastern Oklahoma State	W 55-24	2-1	Waco, TX
*	Southeastern Oklahoma State	W 39-38	3-1	Waco, TX
*	Oklahoma Baptist	W 49-30	4-1	Waco, TX
*	Southwestern Oklahoma State	L 21-30	4-2	Waco, TX
	at TCU	W 32-24	5-2	Fort Worth, TX
	Texas A&M	W 29-23	6-2	Waco, TX
	Rice	W 41-21	7-2	Waco, TX
	Texas A&M	W 40-33	8-2	Waco, TX
	Arkansas	W 34-28	9-2	Waco, TX
	Arkansas	L 31-42	9-3	Waco, TX
	at SMU	W 38-26	10-3	Dallas, TX
	TCU	L 31-33	10-4	Waco, TX
	Texas	W 46-30	11-4	Waco, TX
	Rice	W 36-23	12-4	Waco, TX
	at Texas	W 35-30	13-4	Austin, TX
	SMU	W 40-28	14-4	Waco, TX
*Non-conference game. (#) Tournament seedings in parentheses.
