= 1945–46 Baylor Bears basketball team =

American college basketball season

1945–46 Baylor Bears men's basketball

Southwest Conference champions

NCAA tournament, Regional semifinals
- Conference: Southwest Conference
- Record: 25-5 (11-1 SWC)
- Head coach: Bill Henderson

1945–46 Southwest Conference men's basketball standings
	Conf.				Overall
Team	W		L	PCT	W		L	PCT
Baylor	11	–	1	.917	25	–	5	.833
Arkansas	9	–	3	.750	16	–	7	.696
Texas	7	–	5	.583	16	–	7	.696
TCU	6	–	6	.500	13	–	11	.542
Rice	5	–	7	.417	10	–	11	.476
Texas A&M	4	–	8	.333	9	–	14	.391
SMU	0	–	12	.000	7	–	16	.304

The 1945-46 Baylor Bears basketball team represented the Baylor University during the 1945-46 college men's basketball season.

== Schedule ==
Date time, TV	Opponent	Result	Record	Site city, state
*	at Randolph AFB	W 53-40	1-0	
*	at Cadet Center	W 47-38	2-0	
*	North Texas	W 58-29	3-0	Waco, TX
*	at North Texas	W 78-28	4-0	Denton, TX
*	Randolph AFB	W 75-26	5-0	Waco, TX
*	Camp Hood	W 59-55	6-0	Waco, TX
*	at Dallas NAS	W 66-42	7-0	
*	Pepperdine	W 40-36	8-0	Oklahoma City, OK
*	Oklahoma	W 43-42	9-0	Oklahoma City, OK
*	Oklahoma A&M	L 46-65	9-1	Oklahoma City, OK
*	at Southwestern Louisiana	W 74-35	10-1	
*	at Northwestern Louisiana	W 67-49	11-1	
	Arkansas	L 37-49	11-2	Waco, TX
	Arkansas	W 40-28	12-2	Waco, TX
	SMU	W 58-38	13-2	Waco, TX
	Rice	W 43-35	14-2	Waco, TX
*	Dallas NAS	W 59-52	15-2	Waco, TX
	at Rice	W 40-32	16-2	Houston, TX
	Texas	W 51-36	17-2	Waco, TX
	TCU	W 55-40	18-2	Waco, TX
	at SMU	W 57-48	19-2	Dallas, TX
	at Texas	W 43-42	20-2	Austin, TX
	at Texas A&M	W 54-48	21-2	College Station, TX
	at TCU	W 54-40	22-2	Fort Worth, TX
	Texas A&M	W 44-41	23-2	Waco, TX
*	at Canisius	W 57-48	24-2	
*	at New York U	L 57-72	24-3	
*	at Bainbridge Naval	W 61-56	25-3	Waco, TX
*	Oklahoma A&M	L 29-44	25-4	Kansas City, MO
*	Colorado	L 44-59	25-5	Kansas City, MO
*Non-conference game. (#) Tournament seedings in parentheses.
