= Bill Menefee =

American basketball player and coach (1921–2016)

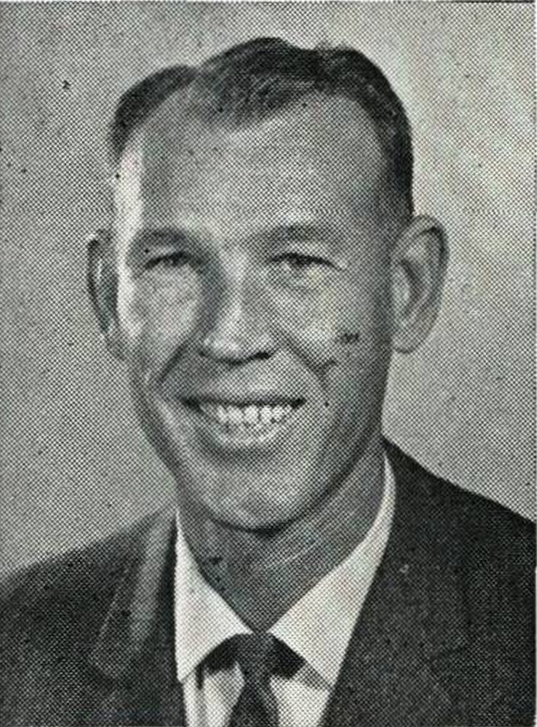
- Menefee, c. 1964

Biographical details
- Born: July 8, 1921; Breckenridge, Texas, U.S.
- Died: December 8, 2016 (aged 95); Waco, Texas, U.S.
- Education: North Texas State Teachers College

Playing career
- Position: Forward

Coaching career (HC unless noted)
- 1961–1973: Baylor

Administrative career (AD unless noted)
- 1980–1992: Baylor

Head coaching record
- Overall: 149–144

Accomplishments and honors

Awards
- All-American (1943); 3× Southwest Conference Coach of the Year (1965, 1968, 1969); University of North Texas Athletics Hall of Fame (1994); Baylor University Athletics Hall of Fame (1997); Southwest Conference Hall of Fame (2017)

Billy Mills Menefee (July 8, 1921 – December 8, 2016) was an American basketball coach who was the head coach of the Baylor Bears men's basketball program from 1961 until 1973. He also served as the athletic director at Baylor University from 1980 to 1992.

Menefee was born in Breckenridge, Texas, and attended North Texas State Teachers College, where he played college basketball and earned All-American honors in 1943. During World War II, he served in the United States Marine Corps and participated in the Pacific War, earning a Bronze Star Medal and a Purple Heart. Following the war, he joined the coaching staff for the men's basketball program at Baylor University. He was promoted to head coach in 1961 following the retirement of head coach Bill Henderson. As head coach, Menefee was awarded the coach of the year award by the Southwest Conference three times. He retired in 1973. In 1980, he became the university's athletic director, a position he held until 1992. Following this retirement, he was inducted into the athletics halls of fame for both Baylor and North Texas. He died in Waco, Texas, in 2016, following which he was posthumously inducted into the Southwest Conference Hall of Fame of the Texas Sports Hall of Fame.

== Early life ==
Menefee was born in Breckenridge, Texas, on July 8, 1921. He was the son of an oil worker and described his family while growing up as "dirt poor". His family relocated several times around West Texas as his father attempted to find work, especially during the Great Depression, and Menefee has been described as being a native of both Grandfalls, Texas, and McCamey, Texas. In high school, Menefee participated in several sports programs, and in 1939, he graduated from McCamey High School as a star athlete for the school's basketball, American football, and tennis programs.

== College career ==
Following high school, Menefee attended North Texas State Teachers College, where he joined the Eagles men's basketball team as a walk-on. During his playing career, Menefee, a forward, was a two-time team captain and earned All-American honors in 1943. That same year, North Texas ended their season with a third-place finish in that year's NAIA men's basketball championship tournament. Menefee graduated in 1943 with a bachelor's degree in health education and, after returning to North Texas following World War II, he earned a master's degree in the same field of study in 1948. While studying at North Texas, Menefee met and married Dorothy Winford, a fellow student.

== Military career ==
In 1941, while still a student at North Texas, Menefee enlisted in the United States Marine Corps Reserve. Following his graduation, he saw active duty in the Pacific War as a rifle platoon leader in the 1st Battalion, 5th Marines. On April 1, 1945, Menefee's platoon landed on Okinawa Island as part of the Battle of Okinawa. During his three-month stint on the island, Menefee lost 40 pounds (18 kg) and was wounded by shrapnel, earning him a Purple Heart. Additionally, he was awarded a Bronze Star Medal for his service. By the end of the war, Menefee had been promoted to an executive officer and, later, a company commander.

== Coaching career ==
Following his military service, Menefee joined the coaching staff of the Bears men's basketball program at Baylor University. In 1947, he was hired by the university as a physical education instructor, and he also worked as an assistant coach and the head coach for the freshman team. Serving under head coach Bill Henderson, Menefee was part of the coaching staff for the 1948 team, which was the runner-up in the 1948 NCAA basketball championship game, and the 1950 team, which made it to the Final Four of the 1950 NCAA basketball tournament.

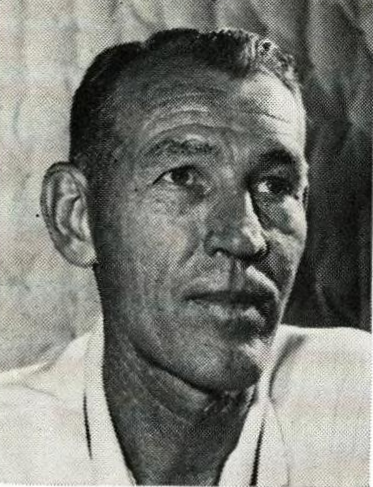
Menefee as the head coach of the Baylor Bears men's basketball team, c. 1969

In 1961, following Henderson's retirement, Menefee was promoted to the head coach position for the Bears. From 1961 until his retirement in 1973, Menefee recorded an overall record of 149–144. During his tenure, Menefee was awarded the Southwest Conference Coach of the Year award in 1965, 1968, and 1969, and led the Bears to conference champion runner-up positions in 1967, 1968, 1969, and 1971. Additionally, the 1968–69 team was ranked No. 19 by the Associated Press, which would be the last time a Baylor team was ranked until the 2008–09 team.

== Administrative career ==
On September 1, 1980, Menefee became the athletic director for Baylor University, taking over the position from previous director Jack Patterson. As athletic director, Menefee oversaw the Baylor Bears football program win a conference championship and participate in five bowl games. Additionally, the men's basketball program under his directorship participated in both the NCAA Division I men's basketball tournament and the National Invitation Tournament. Menefee also established an athletic scholarship program and participated in fundraising for the construction of the North End Zone Complex at Floyd Casey Stadium. In 1986, Baylor's alumni association awarded Menefee with the "Alumnus by Choice" award for his contributions to the university. He retired from the position of athletic director in 1992.

== Later life and death ==
In the 1990s, Menefee was inducted into the athletics halls of fame for both the University of North Texas (1994) and Baylor University (1997). In 2004, Baylor's alumni association awarded him the Retired Faculty Award in recognition of his continued involvement with the university, which included the establishment of a scholarship fund in 1992. In 2012, his wife died after 69 years of marriage. Four years later, on December 8, 2016, Menefee died in Waco, Texas, and was buried in Waco Memorial Park. Following his death, he bequeathed a gift to the North Texas Mean Green women's basketball program, as he had developed an interest in the sport following his retirement. He was survived by two children, who were both graduates of Baylor, and three grandchildren, who all lived in Waco. A year after his death, he was posthumously inducted into the Southwest Conference Hall of Fame of the Texas Sports Hall of Fame.

== Head coaching record ==
=== College ===
Record table
Season	Team	Overall	Conference	Standing	Postseason
Baylor Bears (Southwest Conference) (1961–1973)
1961–62	Baylor	4–20	1–13	8th	
1962–63	Baylor	7–17	4–10	7th	
1963–64	Baylor	7–17	2–12	7th	
1964–65	Baylor	15–9	8–6	3rd	
1965–66	Baylor	8–16	6–8	T–6th	
1966–67	Baylor	14–10	8–6	T–2nd	
1967–68	Baylor	15–9	8–6	T–2nd	
1968–69	Baylor	18–6	10–4	2nd	
1969–70	Baylor	15–9	8–6	T–3rd	
1970–71	Baylor	18–8	10–4	2nd	
1971–72	Baylor	14–12	4–10	7th	
1972–73	Baylor	14–11	8–6	4th	
Baylor:		149–144 (.509)	76–91 (.455)		
Total:		149–144 (.509)			
National champion Postseason invitational champion Conference regular season champion Conference regular season and conference tournament champion Division regular season champion Division regular season and conference tournament champion Conference tournament champion
