= Bill Keffer =

American politician

William Ralph Keffer

Texas State Representative from District 107 (Dallas County)
- In office January 14, 2003 – January 9, 2007
- Preceded by: Harryette Ehrhardt
- Succeeded by: Allen Vaught

Personal details
- Born: William Ralph Keffer; September 15, 1958 (age 68) McCamey, Texas, U.S.
- Party: Republican
- Spouse: Elizabeth Ann Pitcock Keffer
- Children: Scott, Caroline, and Doug Keffer
- Education: Southern Methodist University; University of Texas School of Law
- Occupation: Attorney

William Ralph Keffer (born September 15, 1958) is an attorney in Dallas, Texas, who was from 2003 to 2007 a Republican member of the Texas House of Representatives from District 107. His older brother, Jim Keffer, is a still-serving Republican House member from District 60 in Eastland, near Abilene, Texas.

== Background ==
Keffer was born in McCamey in energy-rich Upton County in West Texas. He graduated with a Bachelor of Arts in the field of history in 1981 from Southern Methodist University in University Park, Texas. In 1984, he earned his Juris Doctor degree from the University of Texas School of Law in Austin. Since law school, Keffer has been affiliated with the law firm Vial, Hamilton, Koch, & Knox, the Atlantic Richfield Oil and Gas Company, the Dallas law firm Gardere & Wynne, and since 2001, the managing partner of Miller & Keffer, subsequently Miller Keffer Pedigo. Keffer's legal practice focuses on environmental and toxic tort cases stemming from the exploration, production, refining, and transportation of petroleum.

Keffer is a board member of the Dallas chapter of the Federalist Society, a group of lawyers advocating strict construction of the Constitution of the United States He has been chairman of his neighborhood crime watch and president of his homeowner association. He has penned editorials for such publications as the Dallas Morning News, the Lone Star Report and the Lake Highlands Advocate magazine, named for the Lake Highlands section of north Dallas.

Keffer and his wife, the former Elizabeth Ann Pitcock (born 1959), have three children, Scott, Caroline, and Doug Keffer.

== Political life ==
In Keffer's first election to the Texas House in 2002, he defeated the Democrat Theresa Daniel, 20,764 (58.4) to 14,786 (41.6 percent). In that same election John Cornyn was elected to the United States Senate, Rick Perry won his first full term as governor of Texas, and Greg Abbott was elected attorney general to succeed John Cornyn. Daniel was unopposed for the Democratic nomination for the seat, after the incumbent Democrat, Harryette Ehrhardt, declined to seek reelection. Keffer was unopposed for his second term in 2004 but unseated in 2006 by the Democrat Allen Vaught, 16,254 (50.1 percent) to 15,145 (46.7 percent). The remaining 3.2 percent was cast for the Libertarian candidate, Chris Jones.

While in the House, Keffer served on the House Insurance, Energy Resources, and Rules & Regulations committees.

In 2012, after a six-year absence from the legislature, Keffer tried to win the District 114 seat vacated in north Dallas by the retiring Republican Will Ford Hartnett, another Dallas lawyer. Keffer had represented the eastern part of the district when he was the District 107 representative.

In the May 29 primary, a third candidate, David Boone polled the critical 1,138 votes (11.4 percent), sufficient to force a second round of balloting on July 31 between Keffer, who led in the primary with 4,745 votes (47.5 percent), and another Dallas lawyer, the Hispanic Republican activist Jason Villalba, who finished with 4,114 ballots (41.2 percent).

Keffer and Villalba clashed over who would be the more conservative lawmaker. Keffer carried the backing of U.S. Representative Jeb Hensarling of Texas's 5th congressional district, while Villalba was supported by presidential nominee Mitt Romney and retiring U.S. Senator Kay Bailey Hutchison, who called him "the future", and Dallas Mayor Tom Leppert. Keffer endorsed a zero-based budgeting approach to control excessive state spending. Villalba said that he could move past partisanship and work with Democrats to increase the number of charter schools and expand educational funding. Keffer questioned, "How do we handle the state's money? How do we handle the taxpayers' money? What do we have to show for it?"

In the Republican runoff, which coincided with the high-profile Ted Cruz-David Dewhurst contest to choose the party nominee to succeed Senator Hutchison, Villalba reversed the order of finish from the primary to defeat Keffer, 6,100 (51.8 percent) to 5,683 (48.2 percent). Villalba attributed his victor over Keffer to "shoe leather and determination."

In the general election, Villalba defeated Democratic former Representative Carol Kent, 33,970 votes (54.2 percent to Kent's 28,762 (45.8 percent). Kent had served a term in District 102 from 2009 to 2011, having unseated Republican Representative Tony Goolsby in the 2008 general election.

Texas House of Representatives
Preceded by Harryette Ehrhardt	Texas State Representative from District 107 (Dallas County); 2003–2007	Succeeded by Allen Vaught
