= Mike Lang (Texas politician) =

Texas state legislator

Member of the Texas House of Representatives from the 60th district
- In office January 10, 2017 – January 12, 2021
- Preceded by: Jim Keffer
- Succeeded by: Glenn Rogers

Personal details
- Born: August 29, 1962 (age 64)
- Party: Republican
- Occupation: Police officer
- Website: votemikelang.com

Michael William Lang, known as Mike Lang (born August 29, 1962), is an American politician from Granbury in Hood County, Texas. He was the Republican state representative for District 60. He won the general election on November 8, 2016, and was sworn into office on January 10, 2017.

Lang ran without opposition for his second legislative term in the general election held on November 6, 2018.

Texas House of Representatives
Preceded by Jim Keffer	Texas State Representative for District 60 (Brown, Callahan, Coleman, Eastland, Hood, Palo Pinto, Shackelford, and Stephens counties); 2017–2021	Succeeded by Glenn Rogers
