= McCamey, Texas =

City in Upton County, Texas, United States

- City
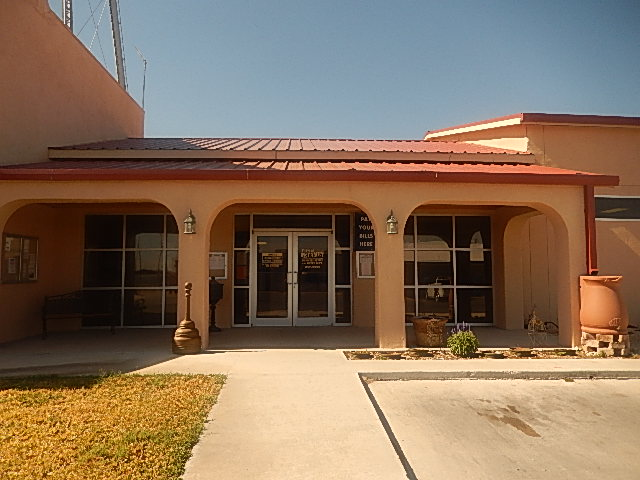
- McCamey City Hall at 207 E. 6th St.

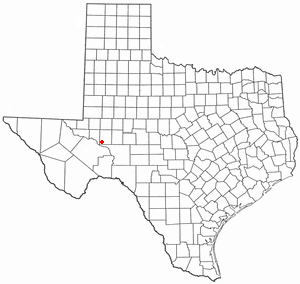
- Location of McCamey, Texas

- Coordinates: 31°7′56″N 102°13′20″W
- Country: United States
- State: Texas
- County: Upton

Area
  - Total: 2.03 sq mi (5.25 km^{2})
  - Land: 2.03 sq mi (5.25 km^{2})
  - Water: 0 sq mi (0.00 km^{2})
- Elevation: 2,467 ft (752 m)

Population (2020)
  - Total: 1,831
  - Density: 903/sq mi (349/km^{2})
- Time zone: UTC-6 (Central (CST))
  - Summer (DST): UTC-5 (CDT)
- ZIP code: 79752
- Area code: 432
- FIPS code: 48-45432
- GNIS feature ID: 1362369
- Website: Official website

McCamey is a city in Upton County, Texas, United States. Its population was 1,831 at the 2020 census. The Texas Legislature has declared McCamey "the Wind Energy Capital of Texas" because of the many wind farms that have been built in the area. Its history, however, is primarily that of an oil boomtown.

== History ==
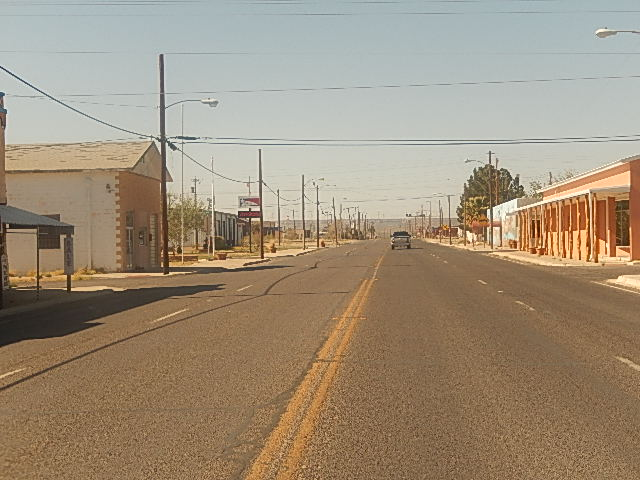
Downtown McCamey

McCamey is named for George B. McCamey, whose 1925 wildcat well brought about the oil boom in the region. He brought in a real estate developer from Corpus Christi to lay out a townsite near the oil field and along the Kansas City, Mexico and Orient Railway capable of housing 10,000 people. The town was initially a jumble of tents and frame shacks; order came slowly, replacing the lawlessness of the early boomtown environment. A post office was built in 1926, and the town was incorporated near the end of that year. In 1927, the McCamey Independent School District was formed, and an enterprising newspaperman printed the first issue of the Tri-County Record, the first town newspaper.

Water supply was a problem in the early years of McCamey, as the nearby water sources were not drinkable. Water came in by train from Alpine, almost 100 miles (160 km) away, at a cost of $1 a barrel. A potable water supply was found in a geologic unit only 17 miles (27 km) distant, and pipes were built to transport it to town in 1929.

McCamey was the location of a Humble Oil Company refinery, one of the first built in West Texas. Humble Oil & Refining Company was a corporate predecessor of Exxon Company. An early experiment by Shell Oil Company in massive oil storage in McCamey proved a failure; local oilmen built a reservoir to hold up to one million barrels of oil in an earthen tank, but the limestone formation underneath the tank cracked under the weight of the crude, allowing much of it to leak into the subsurface.

The population of the town declined during the Great Depression along with the price of oil, and as the discovery of large oil fields elsewhere pulled workers away. In 1940, about 2,600 people were in McCamey; in 1980, 2,436; and the 2000 census showed the population had shrunk to 1,805.

== Demographics ==
Historical population
Census	Pop.	Note	%±
1930	3,446		—
1940	2,595		−24.7%
1950	3,121		20.3%
1960	3,375		8.1%
1970	2,647		−21.6%
1980	2,436		−8.0%
1990	2,493		2.3%
2000	1,805		−27.6%
2010	1,887		4.5%
2020	1,831		−3.0%
U.S. Decennial Census

=== 2020 census ===
As of the 2020 census, 1,831 people, 693 households, and 425 families resided in the city.

The median age was 37.7 years; 27.4% of residents were under 18 and 16.1% were 65 or older. For every 100 females, there were 99.0 males, and for every 100 females 18 and over, there were 104.6 males 18 and over.

Of those households, 38.1% had children under 18 living in them, 45.6% were married-couple households, 24.4% were households with a male householder and no spouse or partner present, and 25.0% were households with a female householder and no spouse or partner present. About 27.3% of all households were made up of individuals and 14.0% had someone living alone who was 65 or older.

Of the 868 housing units, 20.2% were vacant. The homeowner vacancy rate was 1.7% and the rental vacancy rate was 20.6%.

None of residents lived in urban areas, while 100.0% lived in rural areas.

Racial composition as of the 2020 census
Race	Number	Percentage
White	866	47.3%
Black or African American	53	2.9%
American Indian and Alaska Native	1	0.1%
Asian	2	0.1%
Some other race	228	12.5%
Two or more races	681	37.2%
Hispanic or Latino (of any race)	1,242	67.8%

=== 2000 census ===
As of the census of 2000, 1,805 people, 676 households, and 494 families resided in the city. The population density was 900.4 inhabitants per square mile (347.6/km^{2}). The 854 housing units averaged 426.0/sq mi (164.9/km^{2}). The racial makeup of the city was 72.30% White, 1.55% African American, 1.27% Native American, 23.82% from other races, and 1.05% from two or more races. Hispanics or Latinos of any race were 52.30% of the population.

Of the 676 households, 35.7% had children under 18 living with them, 58.1% were married couples living together, 10.9% had a female householder with no husband present, and 26.9% were not families. About 24.9% of all households were made up of individuals, and 12.4% had someone living alone who was 65 or older. The average household size was 2.67, and the average family size was 3.20.

In the city, the age distribution was 30.3% under 18, 8.0% from 18 to 24, 24.7% from 25 to 44, 22.6% from 45 to 64, and 14.4% who were 65 or older. The median age was 36 years. For every 100 females, there were 95.1 males. For every 100 females 18 and over, there were 91.2 males.

The median income in the city for a household was $25,233 and for a family was $28,906. Males had a median income of $31,513 versus $16,724 for females. The per capita income for the city was $12,171. About 23.2% of families and 24.7% of the population were below the poverty line, including 30.6% of those under 18 and 16.6% of those 65 or over.

== Geography ==
McCamey is located at 31°7′56″N 102°13′20″W (31.132300, –102.222106). The town is about 5 miles (8 km) east of the Pecos River along U.S. Route 67. The city is approximately halfway between El Paso and San Antonio.

According to the United States Census Bureau, the city has a total area of 2.0 square miles (5.2 km^{2}), all land.

== Climate ==
According to the Köppen climate classification, McCamey has a hot semiarid climate, BSh on climate maps. The hottest temperature recorded in McCamey was 113 °F (45.0 °C) on June 20, 1934, August 12, 1936, and June 27, 1994, while the coldest temperature recorded was −2 °F (−18.9 °C) on January 11, 1962.

Climate data for McCamey, Texas, 1991–2020 normals, extremes 1932–present
Month	Jan	Feb	Mar	Apr	May	Jun	Jul	Aug	Sep	Oct	Nov	Dec	Year
Record high °F (°C)	88 (31)	94 (34)	100 (38)	105 (41)	109 (43)	113 (45)	112 (44)	113 (45)	108 (42)	103 (39)	93 (34)	91 (33)	113 (45)
Mean maximum °F (°C)	79.9 (26.6)	84.3 (29.1)	90.9 (32.7)	96.2 (35.7)	102.3 (39.1)	105.3 (40.7)	104.2 (40.1)	102.6 (39.2)	99.5 (37.5)	94.8 (34.9)	84.9 (29.4)	79.4 (26.3)	107.2 (41.8)
Mean daily maximum °F (°C)	60.5 (15.8)	65.8 (18.8)	74.2 (23.4)	82.3 (27.9)	89.8 (32.1)	95.5 (35.3)	96.3 (35.7)	95.9 (35.5)	89.5 (31.9)	80.8 (27.1)	69.6 (20.9)	61.4 (16.3)	80.1 (26.7)
Daily mean °F (°C)	46.7 (8.2)	51.5 (10.8)	59.4 (15.2)	67.6 (19.8)	76.3 (24.6)	83.2 (28.4)	84.8 (29.3)	84.3 (29.1)	77.6 (25.3)	68.1 (20.1)	56.0 (13.3)	47.8 (8.8)	66.9 (19.4)
Mean daily minimum °F (°C)	32.8 (0.4)	37.2 (2.9)	44.6 (7.0)	53.0 (11.7)	62.8 (17.1)	70.9 (21.6)	73.3 (22.9)	72.7 (22.6)	65.7 (18.7)	55.3 (12.9)	42.5 (5.8)	34.1 (1.2)	53.7 (12.1)
Mean minimum °F (°C)	20.7 (−6.3)	24.1 (−4.4)	29.2 (−1.6)	36.6 (2.6)	47.5 (8.6)	61.9 (16.6)	66.8 (19.3)	65.4 (18.6)	53.1 (11.7)	37.6 (3.1)	26.5 (−3.1)	21.0 (−6.1)	16.8 (−8.4)
Record low °F (°C)	−2 (−19)	−1 (−18)	12 (−11)	26 (−3)	33 (1)	44 (7)	60 (16)	55 (13)	38 (3)	22 (−6)	12 (−11)	6 (−14)	−2 (−19)
Average precipitation inches (mm)	0.69 (18)	0.55 (14)	0.86 (22)	1.08 (27)	1.26 (32)	2.11 (54)	1.69 (43)	1.88 (48)	1.81 (46)	1.42 (36)	0.82 (21)	0.65 (17)	14.82 (378)
Average snowfall inches (cm)	0.2 (0.51)	0.0 (0.0)	0.0 (0.0)	0.0 (0.0)	0.0 (0.0)	0.0 (0.0)	0.0 (0.0)	0.0 (0.0)	0.0 (0.0)	0.0 (0.0)	0.3 (0.76)	0.6 (1.5)	1.1 (2.77)
Average precipitation days (≥ 0.01 in)	3.2	2.6	2.9	2.3	4.0	3.2	3.7	4.2	4.0	3.3	2.1	2.5	38.0
Average snowy days (≥ 0.1 in)	0.2	0.0	0.0	0.0	0.0	0.0	0.0	0.0	0.0	0.0	0.1	0.1	0.4
Source 1: NOAA
Source 2: National Weather Service

== Education ==
The City of McCamey is served by the McCamey Independent School District.

== Transportation ==
=== Intercity bus ===
McCamey is served by All Aboard America!'s twice-daily route between Midland International Air and Space Port and Presidio, with intermediate stops at Odessa, Crane, Ft. Stockton, Alpine, and Marfa.

== Notable people ==
- Gary Gilmore, first person executed in the United States after capital punishment was reinstated in 1976, was born in McCamey on December 4, 1940.
- Jill Jackson, Ray Hildebrand's partner in the 1960s duo Paul & Paula, was born in McCamey on May 20, 1942. Their 1963 hit song called "Hey Paula" reached number one on the Billboard Top 40 charts
- Bill Keffer, Republican member of the Texas House of Representatives from District 107 from 2003 to 2007; Dallas lawyer born in McCamey in 1958; brother of former state Representative Jim Keffer
- Dan Seals, country singer/musician, is also known as "England Dan", half of the soft rock duo England Dan & John Ford Coley. Born February 8, 1948, in McCamey, he died March 25, 2009, of mantle cell lymphoma (aged 61) in Nashville, Tennessee.

== See also ==
- List of municipalities in Texas
