= McCamey Independent School District =

School district in Texas

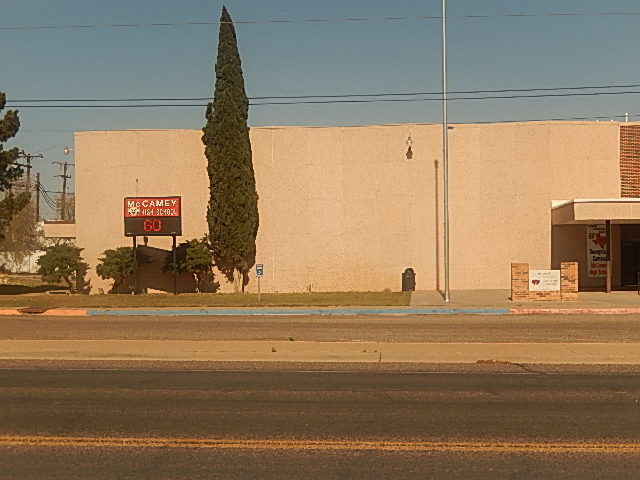
McCamey High School

McCamey Independent School District is a public school district based in McCamey in Upton County, Texas (USA).

In 2009, the school district was rated "academically acceptable" by the Texas Education Agency.

== Schools ==
- McCamey High School (Grades 9-12)
- McCamey Middle School (Grades 5-8)
- McCamey Primary School (Grades PK-4)
