= Jim Keffer =

American politician

James Lloyd "Jim" Keffer

Member of the Texas House of Representatives from the 60th district
- In office January 14, 1997 – January 9, 2017
- Preceded by: John R. Cook
- Succeeded by: Mike Lang

Personal details
- Born: January 20, 1953 (age 73) San Angelo, Tom Green County; Texas, United States
- Party: Republican
- Spouse: Leslie Keffer
- Children: 3
- Education: Texas Tech University
- Occupation: Businessman

James Lloyd Keffer (born January 20, 1953) is a businessman from Eastland, Texas, who is a former Republican member of the Texas House of Representatives from District 60, which includes Eastland County located east of Abilene, as well as Brown, Callahan, Coleman, Shackelford, Stephens Palo Pinto, and Hood counties.

== Biography ==
Keffer was born in San Angelo in Tom Green County in West Texas. A lifelong Republican, Keffer is a former Eastland County GOP chairman. A graduate of Texas Tech University in Lubbock, Keffer is president of EBAA Iron Sales in Eastland. Keffer previously served as chairman of the House Ways and Means and Economic Development Committee.

Keffer was initially elected to the Texas House in 1996, when he narrowly unseated the Democratic incumbent John R. Cook, 21,922 (50.6 percent) to 21,409 (49.4 percent).

In 2010, he co-founded the "Debt Busters Program" for the Texas Republican Party, an endeavor that brought solvency to party coffers under the administration of GOP state chairman Steve Munisteri.

A group called the Texas Conservative Roundtable's grading system dubbed him a "Lone Star Conservative Leader" in 2012 because of his pro-business voting record.

Keffer was reelected without opposition to a ninth House term in the general election held on November 6, 2012.

As of 2013, he was the chairman of the House Committee on Energy Resources and a member of the Natural Resources and Redistricting committees.

In the Republican primary on March 4, 2014, Keffer won re-nomination with 14,160 votes (56.3 percent) against his lone opponent, Cullen Crisp, who received 10,992 votes (43.7 percent).

Keffer's younger brother, William R. "Bill" Keffer, a Dallas lawyer who was born in Upton County in 1958, was from 2003 to 2007 a member of the Texas House from District 107 in the Lake Highlands section of northern Dallas County. Bill Keffer lost a Republican runoff election in District 114 on July 31, 2012, to Jason Villalba.

Texas House of Representatives
Preceded by John R. Cook	Texas State Representative from District 60 (Brown, Callahan, Coleman, Eastland, Hood, Palo Pinto, Shackelford, and Stephens counties); 1997–2017	Succeeded by Mike Lang
