= Graham, Texas =

- City
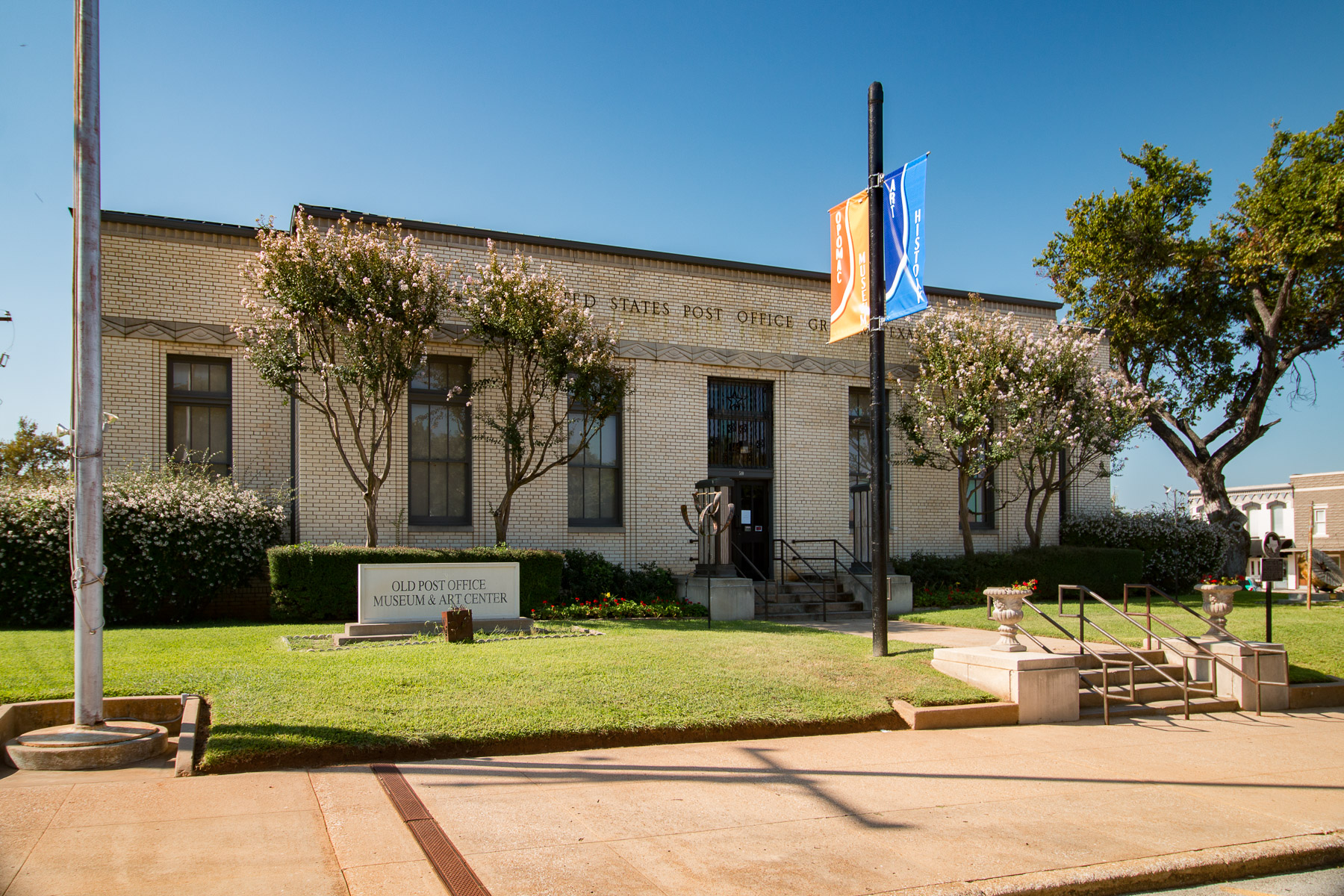
- Post office

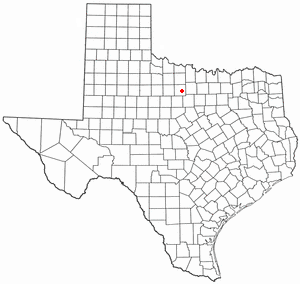
- Location of Graham, Texas

- Coordinates: 33°06′53″N 98°34′37″W
- Country: United States
- State: Texas
- County: Young

Area
  - Total: 5.62 sq mi (14.56 km^{2})
  - Land: 5.60 sq mi (14.50 km^{2})
  - Water: 0.027 sq mi (0.07 km^{2})
- Elevation: 1,066 ft (325 m)

Population (2020)
  - Total: 8,732
  - Density: 1,560/sq mi (602.2/km^{2})
- Time zone: UTC-6 (Central (CST))
  - Summer (DST): UTC-5 (CDT)
- ZIP code: 76450
- Area code: 940
- FIPS code: 48-30392
- GNIS feature ID: 2410628
- Website: City of Graham, Texas Official Website

Graham is the county seat of and the largest city in Young County, Texas, United States. As of the 2020 census, Graham had a population of 8,732.

== History ==
The site was first settled in 1871 by brothers Gustavus A. and Edwin S. Graham, primary shareholders in the Texas Emigration and Land Company of Louisville, Kentucky. The brothers moved to Texas after the Civil War, and after buying 125,000 acres (510 km^{2}) in then-vast Young County, helped to revitalize the area, the population of which had become badly depleted during the war. During that same year as when Graham was settled, the Warren Wagon Train raid occurred about 12 miles north of the city. In 1872, the Graham brothers purchased a local saltworks, established the town of Graham, and set up the Graham Land Office. The saltworks were not a profitable venture, as the salt was too expensive to ship, and were closed in a few years.

New families started to arrive, and the brothers began promoting the sale of homesites and doing civic improvements. A post office opened in 1873, and after Young County reorganized the following year, Graham became the county seat. The town's newspaper, known as The Graham Leader and still in existence today, was first printed in 1876, the same year that the first temporary courthouse was built. Other businesses from these early years included a gristmill, sawmill, cotton gin, and brick kiln, two hotels, and several stores.

On February 15, 1877, the city was the site of the organizational meeting of the group that became the Texas and Southwestern Cattle Raisers Association, created to police ranching and put a stop to cattle rustling. Founding officers included pioneer ranchers James C. Loving (son of Oliver Loving), Col. C. L. (Kit) Carter, and C.C. Slaughter. A three-story limestone courthouse was built in 1884, and it was replaced by a new courthouse in the early 1930s. The 1884 structure's east door still stands on the courthouse square. From 1879 to 1896, Graham was the seat of a federal district court overseen by Judge A.P. McCormick; his jurisdiction extended over all of Texas north and west to New Mexico.

Edwin Graham had married Addie Mary Kintner in 1865. They had five children. Throughout the 1870s, they divided their time between Texas and their families back north, but in 1879, with the town flourishing, they moved their wives and children to Graham permanently. Edwin and Addie lived there until 1891, then moved to Spokane, Washington, where Edwin died on May 7, 1899. His body was brought back to Graham for burial. Addie moved back to Graham and became a leading civic booster and philanthropist. In 1921, with her son Malcolm, she set up the Graham Foundation as a continuing fund for the city's growth and improvement. Addie died in 1929; she was responsible for the establishment of the Eden Home for the aged.

By 1900, Graham had incorporated as a town, and railroad service began in 1903, through the Chicago, Rock Island & Texas Railroad, part of the Chicago, Rock Island & Pacific system. In 1921, the Wichita Falls and Southern Railroad, one of the Frank Kell and Joseph A. Kemp properties, extended its line into Graham from Newcastle. The WF&S was abandoned in 1954, and the Rock Island sold its line to the Texas Export Railroad in 1972, but was abandoned just two years later.

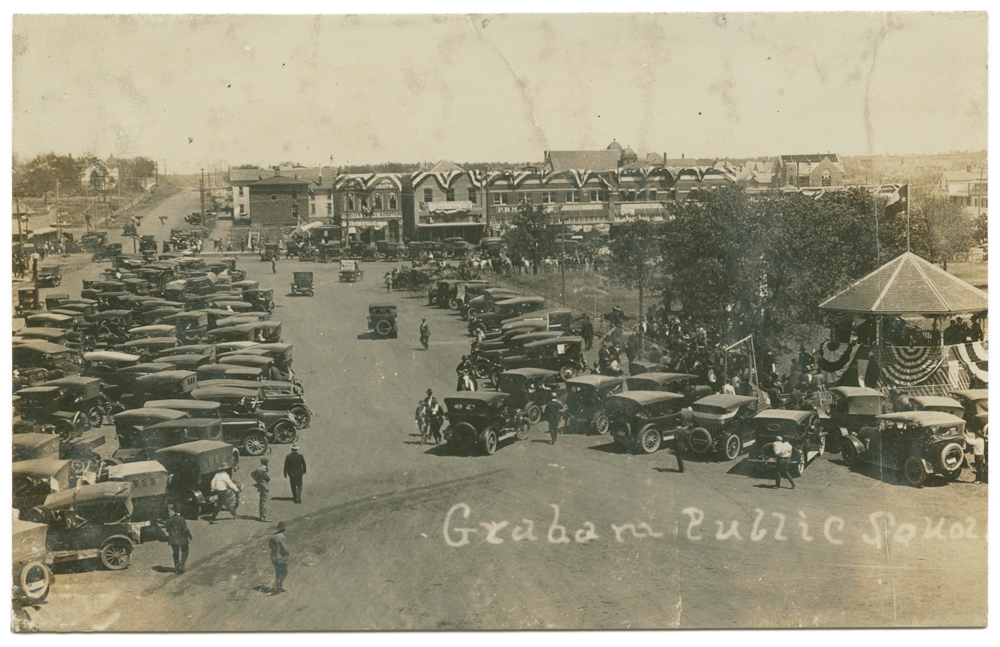
Public Square 1915–1920

The population of Graham grew slowly until 1917, when oil was discovered nearby; the population tripled from 878 in 1900 to 2,544 in 1920. By 1966, Graham had 17 churches, seven schools, a hospital, a radio station, two libraries, three parks, and two newspapers. The population peaked at 9,170 in 1980, and has since gradually declined; it was 8,716 at the 2000 census and 8,518 by the July 2007 estimate, but was up to 8,732 by the 2020 census.

== Geography ==
Graham, the county seat of Young County, is located in the southeast portion of the county, and has an area of 5.592 sq mi (14.48 km^{2}). Geographically, Graham is located in the western Cross Timbers area of North Texas. Locally, this is known as the western portion of the Palo Pinto Mountains.

Creeks drain the area generally into the Brazos River; Dry Creek on the eastern side of town flows into Salt Creek towards the south and into the Brazos. Flatrock Creek drains the rural areas to the southeast and also flows into the Brazos just below where Salt Creek enters. Small impoundments located along Flatrock Creek are used for stock tanks and fish ponds.

=== Climate ===
Climate data for Graham, Texas 76450
Month	Jan	Feb	Mar	Apr	May	Jun	Jul	Aug	Sep	Oct	Nov	Dec	Year
Record high °F (°C)	94 (34)	99 (37)	103 (39)	101 (38)	107 (42)	112 (44)	114 (46)	117 (47)	110 (43)	105 (41)	93 (34)	90 (32)	117 (47)
Mean daily maximum °F (°C)	56.4 (13.6)	60.4 (15.8)	69.5 (20.8)	77.8 (25.4)	84.2 (29.0)	92.1 (33.4)	97.2 (36.2)	97.8 (36.6)	90.0 (32.2)	79.8 (26.6)	67.7 (19.8)	58.4 (14.7)	77.6 (25.3)
Daily mean °F (°C)	42.7 (5.9)	46.5 (8.1)	55.1 (12.8)	63.8 (17.7)	71.6 (22.0)	80.0 (26.7)	84.1 (28.9)	84.1 (28.9)	75.6 (24.2)	65.5 (18.6)	53.5 (11.9)	44.7 (7.1)	64 (18)
Mean daily minimum °F (°C)	29.0 (−1.7)	32.8 (0.4)	40.8 (4.9)	49.9 (9.9)	59.2 (15.1)	67.9 (19.9)	71.4 (21.9)	70.7 (21.5)	63.2 (17.3)	51.2 (10.7)	39.4 (4.1)	31.1 (−0.5)	50.5 (10.3)
Record low °F (°C)	−8 (−22)	−3 (−19)	4 (−16)	20 (−7)	35 (2)	46 (8)	53 (12)	47 (8)	30 (−1)	16 (−9)	10 (−12)	−8 (−22)	−8 (−22)
Average precipitation inches (mm)	1.33 (34)	1.56 (40)	1.97 (50)	2.77 (70)	4.11 (104)	3.45 (88)	2.12 (54)	2.19 (56)	3.22 (82)	2.91 (74)	1.79 (45)	1.57 (40)	28.97 (736)
Average snowfall inches (cm)	1.2 (3.0)	0.9 (2.3)	0.3 (0.76)	0 (0)	0 (0)	0 (0)	0 (0)	0 (0)	0 (0)	0 (0)	0 (0)	0.2 (0.51)	3.0 (7.6)

== Demographics ==
Historical population
Census	Pop.	Note	%±
1880	576		—
1890	667		15.8%
1900	878		31.6%
1910	1,569		78.7%
1920	2,544		62.1%
1930	4,981		95.8%
1940	5,175		3.9%
1950	6,742		30.3%
1960	8,505		26.1%
1970	7,477		−12.1%
1980	9,170		22.6%
1990	8,986		−2.0%
2000	8,716		−3.0%
2010	8,903		2.1%
2020	8,732		−1.9%
U.S. Decennial Census

=== 2020 census ===
As of the 2020 census, 8,732 people, 3,431 households, and 2,357 families were residing in Graham.

The median age was 38.2 years. 25.6% of residents were under the age of 18 and 19.5% were 65 years of age or older. For every 100 females there were 93.1 males, and for every 100 females age 18 and over there were 88.2 males.

98.1% of residents lived in urban areas, while 1.9% lived in rural areas.

There were 3,431 households in Graham, of which 33.2% had children under the age of 18 living in them. Of all households, 48.4% were married-couple households, 15.6% were households with a male householder and no spouse or partner present, and 29.7% were households with a female householder and no spouse or partner present. About 28.6% of all households were made up of individuals and 15.5% had someone living alone who was 65 years of age or older.

There were 3,889 housing units, of which 11.8% were vacant. The homeowner vacancy rate was 2.2% and the rental vacancy rate was 9.5%.

Racial composition as of the 2020 census
Race	Number	Percent
White	6,716	76.9%
Black or African American	70	0.8%
American Indian and Alaska Native	102	1.2%
Asian	46	0.5%
Native Hawaiian and Other Pacific Islander	0	0.0%
Some other race	1,023	11.7%
Two or more races	775	8.9%
Hispanic or Latino (of any race)	2,159	24.7%

=== 2000 census ===
As of the 2000 census, 8,716 people, 3,391 households, and 2,366 families were living in the city. The population density was 1,584.8 people/sq mi (611.9/km^{2}). The 3,904 housing units averaged 709.9/sq mi (274.1/km^{2}). The racial makeup of the city was 88.39% White, 1.24% African American, 0.55% Native American, 0.30% Asian, 7.86% from other races, and 1.66% from two or more races. Hispanics or Latinos of any race were 13.41% of the population.

Of the 3,391 households, 32.6% had children under 18 living with them, 55.9% were married couples living together, 10.3% had a female householder with no husband present, and 30.2% were not families. About 27.3% of all households were made up of individuals, and 15.5% had someone living alone who was 65 or older. The average household size was 2.48, and the average family size was 3.01.

In the city, the age distribution was 26.0% under 18, 7.6% from 18 to 24, 25.2% from 25 to 44, 21.5% from 45 to 64, and 19.8% who were 65 or older. The median age was 39 years. For every 100 females, there were 88.4 males. For every 100 females age 18 and over, there were 83.3 males.

The median income for a household in the city was $31,081, and for a family was $38,118. Males had a median income of $30,221 versus $19,574 for females. The per capita income for the city was $16,587. About 13.0% of families and 17.4% of the population were below the poverty line, including 23.0% of those under age 18 and 13.5% of those age 65 or over.

== Points of interest ==
According to a mural on the courthouse depicting the arrival of the Graham brothers, the town square is physically the largest of any in the country.

As of 2025, the town still has an operational drive-in theater.

Graham Municipal Airport (ICAO code KRPH), located within city limits, has two paved runways: 3/21 is 5,000 feet long and 18/36 is 3,317 feet long.

== Education ==
Public schools in the City of Graham are provided by the Graham Independent School District, the home of the Graham High School Steers.

In 2010, North Central Texas College established a learning base in Graham. The campus offers a wide range of academic-transfer courses, vocational nursing (LVN), oil and gas production technology, allied health certificate programs, and continuing education programs. Graham ISD and NCTC also have a partnership offering dual-credit courses to high school juniors and seniors.

== Notable people ==
- Owen J. Baggett, WWII B-24 Liberator crew member
- Rex Brown, bassist for the heavy metal band Pantera
- Bob Estes, golfer, four-time winner on the PGA Tour
- Sonny Gibbs, former NFL quarterback
- Frank Shelby Groner (1877–1943), president of College of Marshall
- Bob Lilly, NFL Hall of Fame football player, lived in Graham after he retired.
- William D. McFarlane, U.S. Congressman from 1933 to 1939
- Robert McFarlane, national security advisor to President Ronald Reagan
- Dean Smith, 1952 Olympic gold medalist sprinter

== Gallery ==
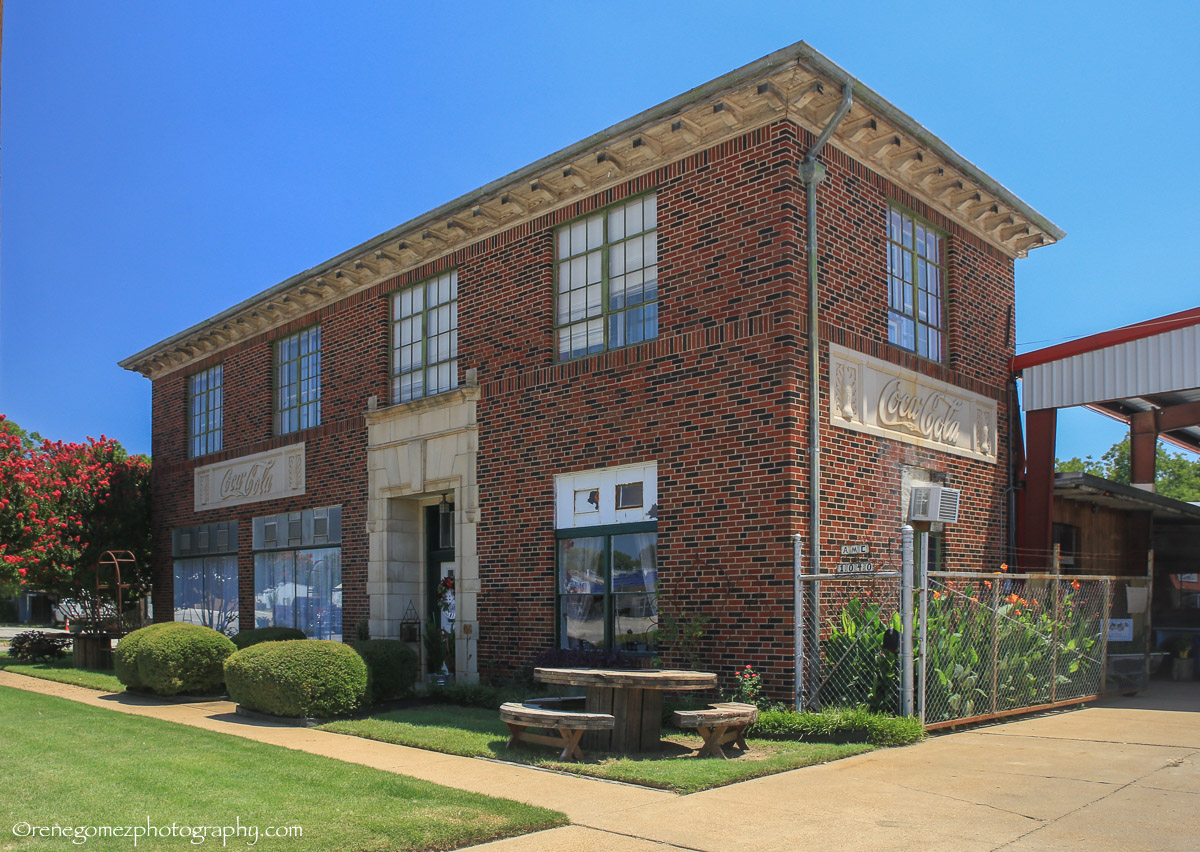
Coca-Cola bottling plant

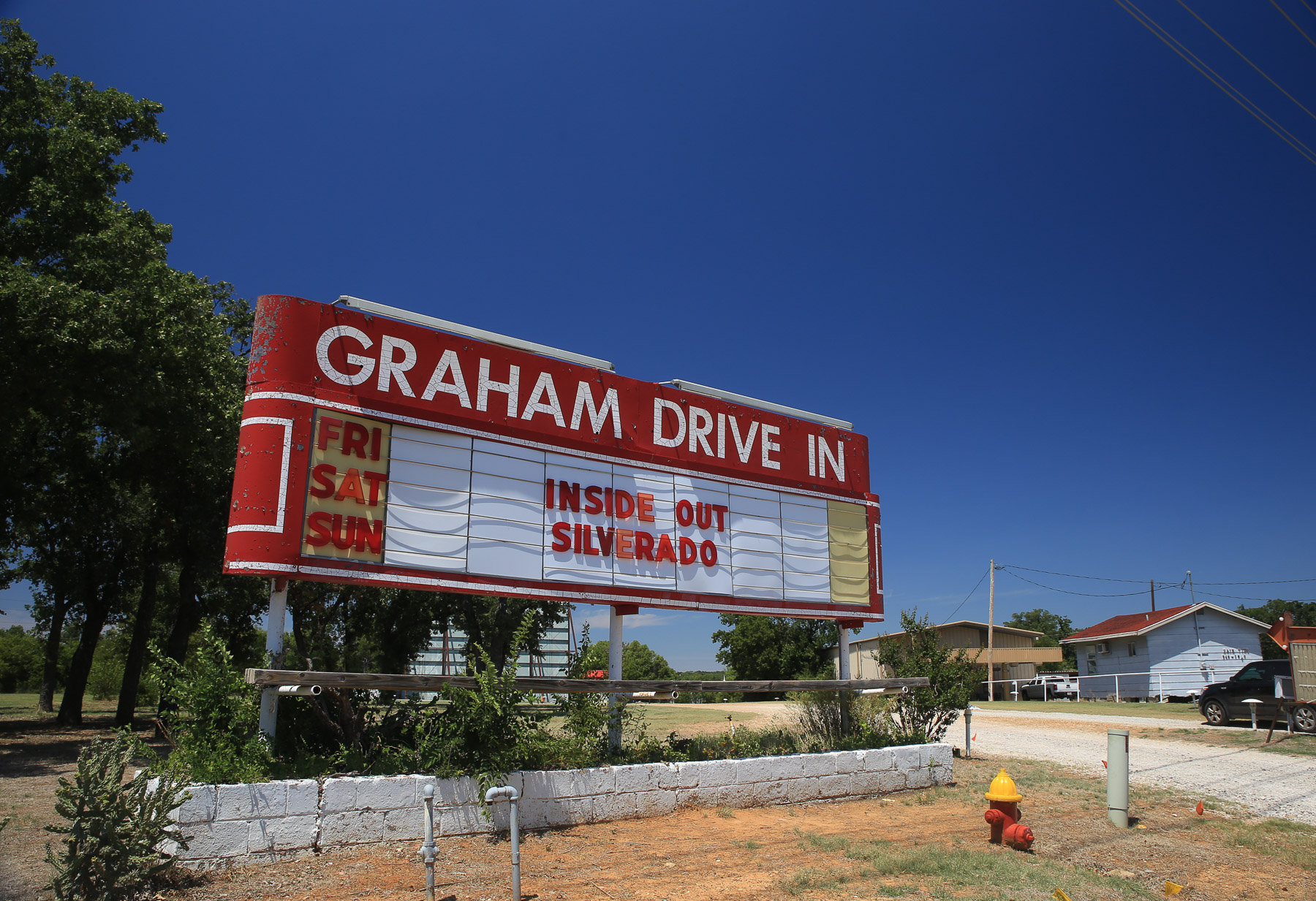
Graham Drive-In

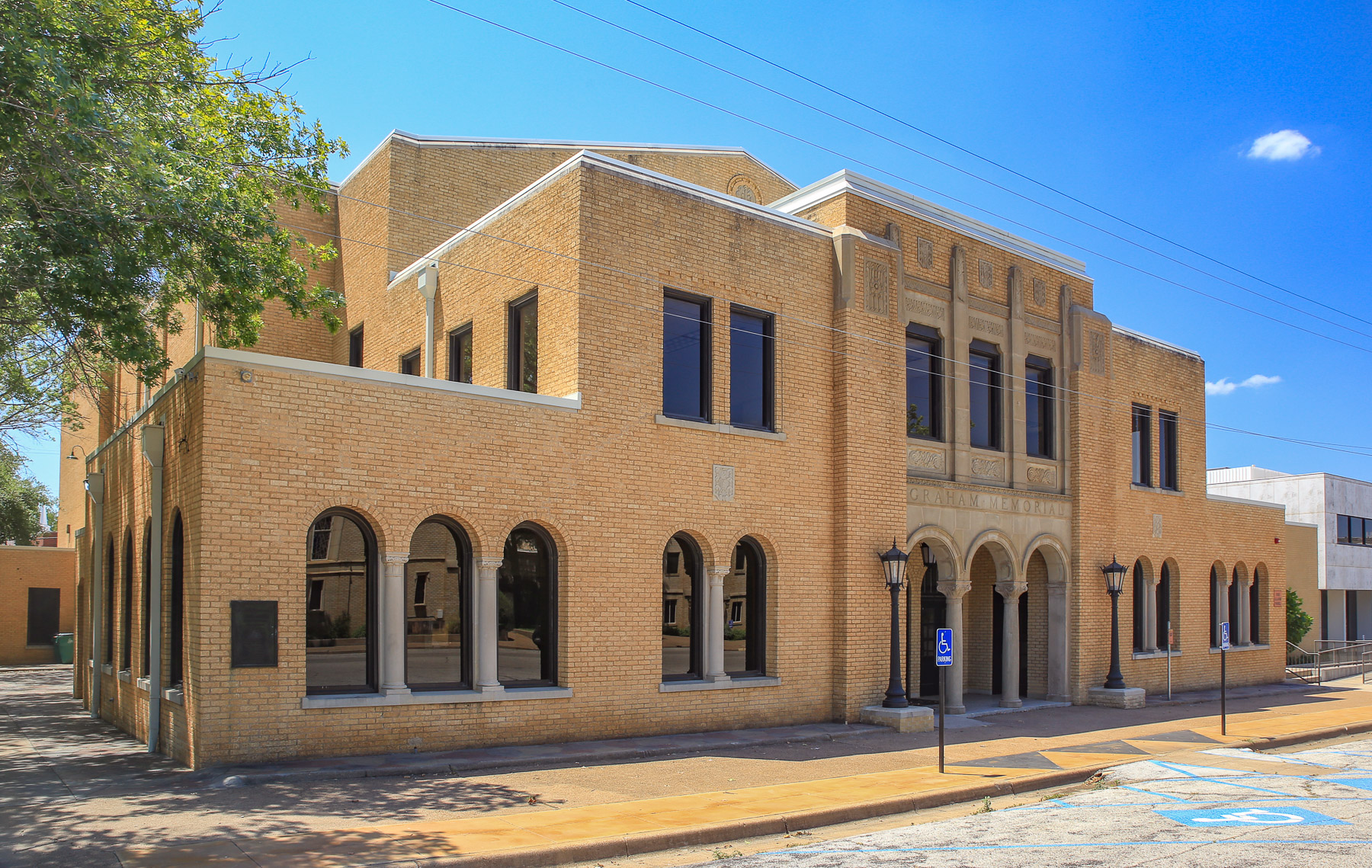
Graham Memorial
