= Michael J. Lang =

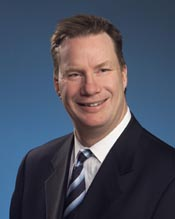
- Born: Lethbridge, Alberta, Canada
- Education: Masters of Business Administration, Bachelors of Science
- Alma mater: University of Alberta
- Occupations: Private Equity Investor, Chairman, Director
- Children: Macen Lang and Mackenzie Lang
- Website: https://www.stonebridge.net/michael-lang

Michael J. Lang is a Canadian Private Equity Investor and sits on the board of directors for numerous companies and organizations. He founded Beau Canada Explorations Ltd., AgJunction and Stonebridge Merchant Capital Corp. He is actively involved with various not-for-profit organization and is past chairman for Calgary Urban Project Society (CUPS). Michael J. Lang received the Sovereign Medal for Volunteerism from the Government of Canada. Mr. Lang was the Honorary Colonel of the King's Own Regiment.

A graduate from the University of Alberta Michael J. Lang is also on the Business Advisory Council for the University of Alberta. and the University of Calgary.

== Education ==
Mr. Lang studied at the University of Alberta obtaining his Bachelor of Science in Biology and Chemistry. Straight after earning his undergraduate degree he continued his studies with the University of Alberta and obtained his Master of Business Administration (MBA). In 2015 Lang was awarded the ICD.D designation through University of Toronto’s Rotman School of Management.

== Career ==
=== Stonebridge Merchant Capital Corporation ===
StoneBridge Merchant Capital Corp. was founded in 1996 and is based in Calgary, Alberta, Canada. Lang currently holds the position of Chairman.

=== AgJunction ===
In 1996 Lang was an early participant in AgJunction, which provides hardware and software applications for precision agriculture and sat as chairman, Member of Compensation Committee and Member of Audit Committee for 19 years. In 2015, he became vice-chairman of the company.

=== Beau Canada Explorations ===
Lang founded Beau Canada Explorations in 1988 and sat as Vice Chairman for 11 years. As of October, 2000, Beau Canada Exploration, Ltd. was acquired by Murphy Oil Corporation. Previously, Beau Canada Exploration, Ltd. was engaged in exploration and development of natural gas in western Canada.

== Honours ==
Michael J. Lang was awarded Honorary Colonel in the King's Own Calgary Regiment (KOCR) in 2013.

Michael J. Lang was the recipient of the Government of Canada Sovereign Medal for Volunteerism in 2022.
