= Graham Independent School District =

School district in Texas, United States

Coordinates: 33.1059°N 98.5927°W

Address
- 400 Third Street Graham, Texas, 76450; United States

District information
- Type: Public
- Grades: PK–12
- Schools: 4
- NCES District ID: 4821360

Students and staff
- Students: 2,148 (2024–2025)
- Teachers: 157.16 (on an FTE basis) (2024–2025)
- Staff: 169.64 (on an FTE basis) (2024–2025)
- Student–teacher ratio: 13.67 (2024–2025)

Graham Independent School District is a public school district based in Graham, Texas, United States.

Located in Young County, a very small portion of the district lies in Stephens County.

In 2009, the school district was rated "academically acceptable" by the Texas Education Agency.

== Schools ==
- Graham High School (Grades 9-12)
- Graham Junior High (Grades 6-8)
- Woodland Elementary (Grades 4-5)
- Crestview Elementary (Grades 1-3)
- Pioneer Elementary (Grades PK-K)
