= Jim Haller =

American college athlete, coach and administrator

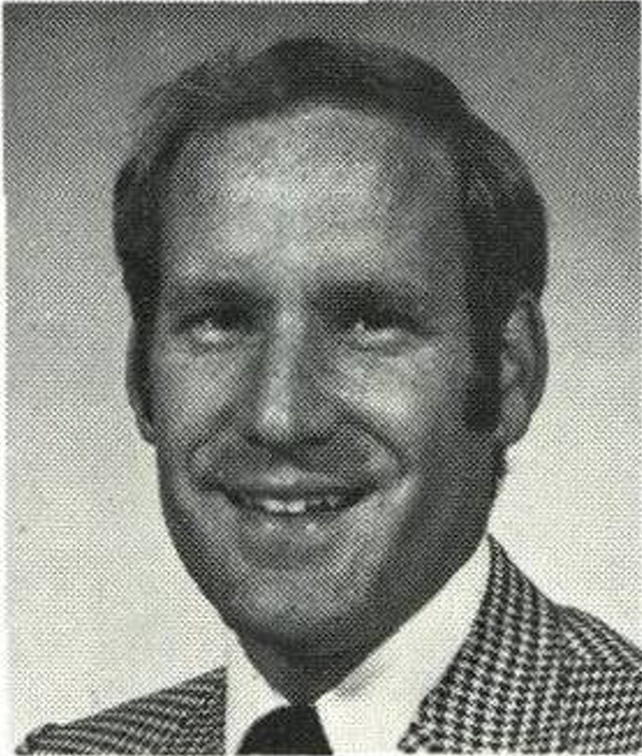
- Haller, c. 1976

Playing career
- 1963–1965: Lon Morris College
- 1965–1967: Sam Houston State

Coaching career (HC unless noted)
- 1972–1973: McLennan CC
- 1973–1977: Baylor (assistant)
- 1977–1985: Baylor

Head coaching record
- Overall: 102–130

Jim Haller is an American former college basketball coach. He was head men's coach for Baylor University from 1977 to 1985.

Haller went to Thomas Jefferson High School in Dallas, then played college basketball at Lon Morris College and Sam Houston State. After stints coaching at McCallum and Austin high schools in Austin, Texas, he became head coach for McLennan Community College in 1972. At his one season at McLennan, he led the team to a 24–2 record. This success attracted the attention of new Baylor coach Carroll Dawson, who hired the then-27 year old Haller as an assistant.

Haller served as an assistant until 1977, when Dawson unexpectedly resigned during the 1976–77 season and he was elevated to the head coach role. Haller finished that season and continued as head coach for nine seasons. In the 1984–85 season, Haller was recorded by one of his players discussing steroid use and suggesting the player use travel per diem in a way not allowed by the NCAA. Haller resigned under fire in February of that season. His overall record at Baylor was 102–130 for a .440 winning percentage.
