= Luther Burleson =

American sports coach (1880–1924)

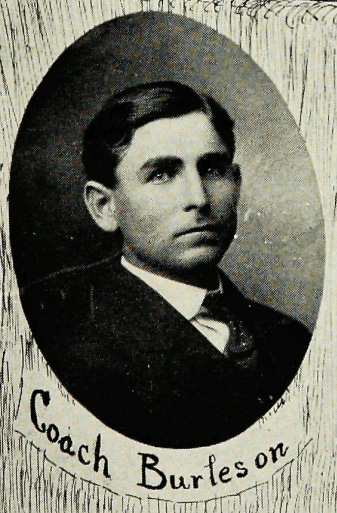
- Burleson pictured in The Round-Up 1908, Baylor yearbook

Biographical details
- Born: November 16, 1880; Buffalo, Texas, U.S.
- Died: November 17, 1924 (aged 44); Stephenville, Texas, U.S.

Playing career

Football
- c. 1900: Trinity (TX)

Baseball
- c. 1900: Trinity (TX)

Coaching career (HC unless noted)

Football
- 1907: Baylor
- 1909: Daniel Baker
- 1913: Trinity (TX)
- 1918: Trinity (TX)

Basketball
- 1906–1908: Baylor

Baseball
- 1906–1908: Baylor

Administrative career (AD unless noted)
- 1907–1908: Baylor

Head coaching record
- Overall: 4–3–1 (football, Baylor only); 10–9 (basketball); 25–34 (baseball)

Luther Franklin Burleson (November 16, 1880 – November 17, 1924) was an American football, basketball, and baseball coach. He served as the seventh head football coach at Baylor University, coaching one season in 1907 and compiling a record of 4–3–1. Burleson was also the first head basketball coach at Baylor, coaching two seasons from 1906 to 1908 and tallying a mark of 10–9. In addition, he was the head baseball coach at Baylor for three seasons, coaching from 1906 to 1908 and amassing a record of 25–34.

Burleson was also the head football coach at Daniel Baker College in Brownwood, Texas in 1909 and Trinity University in San Antonio, Texas in 1913 and 1918. Burleson played football and baseball at Trinity.

Burleson played minor league baseball from 1903 to 1906 as a third baseman. He returned to manage in the minor leagues at the Class D level for the Waxahachie Buffaloes of the Central Texas League in 1914 and the Temple Governors of the Middle Texas League in 1915.

== Head coaching record ==
=== Football ===
Year	Team	Overall	Conference	Standing	Bowl/playoffs
Baylor (Independent) (1907)
1907	Baylor	4–3–1			
Baylor:		4–3–1			
Total:		4–3–1			
