= Baylor Bears men's basketball =

Men's college basketball team

2026–27 Baylor Bears men's basketball team
- University: Baylor University
- First season: 1906–07; 120 years ago
- Athletic director: Doug McNamee
- Head coach: Scott Drew; 24th season, 480–275 (.636)
- Location: Waco, Texas
- Arena: Foster Pavilion (capacity: 7,500)
- NCAA division: Division I
- Conference: Big 12
- Nickname: Bears
- Colors: Green and gold
- Student section: Bear Pit
- All-time record: 1,515–1,439 (.513)
- NCAA tournament record: 24–18 (.571)

NCAA Division I tournament champions
- 2021
Other NCAA Division I tournament results
Runner-up	1948
Final Four	1948, 1950, 2021
Elite Eight	1946, 1948, 1950, 2010, 2012, 2021
Sweet Sixteen	2010, 2012, 2014, 2017, 2021
Appearances	1946, 1948, 1950, 1988, 2008, 2010, 2012, 2014, 2015, 2016, 2017, 2019, 2021, 2022, 2023, 2024, 2025

NIT champions
- 2013

Conference regular-season champions
- SWC: 1932, 1946, 1948, 1949, 1950 Big 12: 2021, 2022

Uniforms
Home	Away
Alternate	Alternate

The Baylor Bears men's basketball (Note: Before the 2021–22 season, Baylor women's basketball had used the nickname "Lady Bears". On September 3, 2021, the school announced that basketball, soccer, and volleyball, the last three Baylor women's sports still using "Lady", would use only "Bears" from that point forward.) team represents Baylor University in Waco, Texas, in NCAA Division I men's basketball competition. The Bears compete in the Big 12 Conference. The team played its home games in Ferrell Center from 1988 until 2023. Baylor now plays its home games in the Foster Pavilion and is currently coached by Scott Drew.

== History ==
=== Early years ===
Luther Burleson coached the first basketball team at Baylor in 1907 also doubling as the football coach. In Baylor's second season of basketball then cross-town rival TCU began their program which the Bears defeated twice during the 1908–09 season. Ralph Glaze's (1911–1914) .788 winning percentage ranks at the best all time in school history. Ralph Wolf (1927–1941) led Baylor to its first SWC Championship in 1932 after surviving and overcoming one of the first great tragedies in college athletics in his first season as coach.

=== Immortal Ten ===
On January 22, 1927, Coach Ralph Wolf's Baylor basketball team was traveling by bus to play the University of Texas. As the bus passed through Round Rock, Texas, it approached railroad tracks on the south side of the business district on a drizzly, cloudy day. As the bus crossed the tracks, the occupants failed to hear the sound of the train whistle and ringing bell. The driver caught sight of the train at the last moment and tried to steer away, but the Sunshine Special crashed into the bus at nearly 60 mph tearing off the roof and right side.

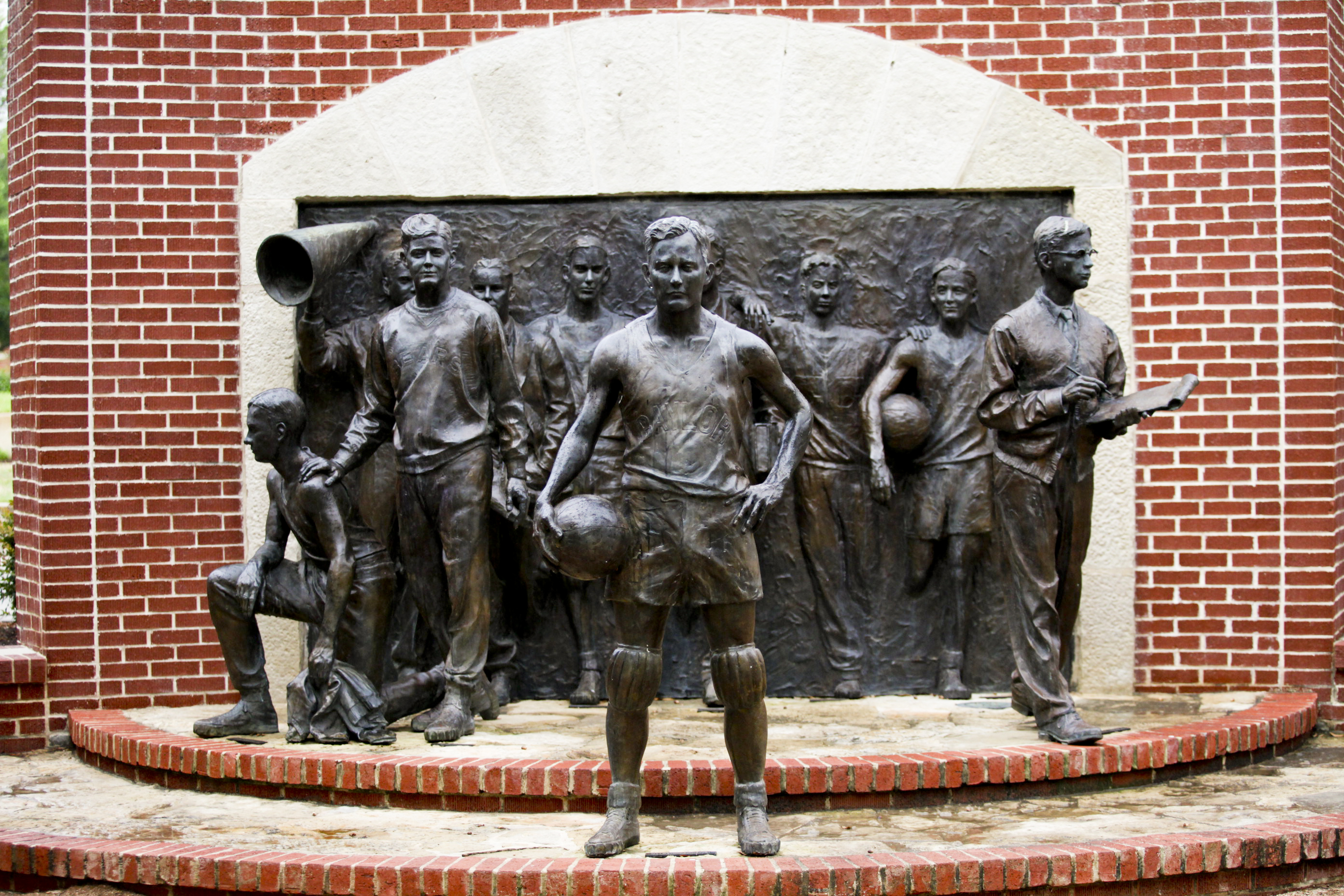
The Immortal Ten Memorial

Ten Baylor students and basketball players were killed by the impact. One player, James Clyde "Abe" Kelly, pushed his friend, Weir Washam, out the window of the bus just moments before the impact, saving Washam's life but costing Kelly his own. The bodies of Kelly and Robert Hailey were found horrifically stretched across the cowcatcher on the front of the train, with arms locked around each other and Kelly missing a leg. Ivy Foster Sr. of Taylor, Texas, had heard of the accident and rushed to the train station in Taylor to meet the train and assist where needed only to find his son among the dead.

The deceased were Jack Castellaw, Sam Dillow, Merle Dudley, L. R. "Ivey" Foster Jr., Robert "Bob" Hailey, James Clyde "Abe" Kelly, Willis Murrary, James "Jim" Walker, and William Winchester.

The remainder of the 1927 season was canceled. The tragedy had reverberations over the entire state and nation and led to the construction of the first railway overpass in Texas where the event occurred at Round Rock. Buses were later required to come to a full stop and open the door at all rail crossings to listen for trains. The Immortal Ten story has been commemorated each year since 1927 at first in Chapel services then later at the Freshman Mass meeting during Homecoming Week. In 2007, the event was also memorialized in bronze on the Baylor campus in Traditions Plaza.

On the 90th anniversary of the tragedy, January 22, 2017, the City of Round Rock held a memorial event to remember those who were killed in the train-bus collision. At the event, the city dedicated the "Immortal Bridge," which arcs over the railroad tracks where the accident occurred. Green lampposts, green-and-gold striping and other markings were added to honor the 10 students who were killed there. The event was open to the public, and attendees included Baylor administrators and student leaders, the spirit squads, and Baylor's Golden Wave Band.

=== Post-World War II success ===
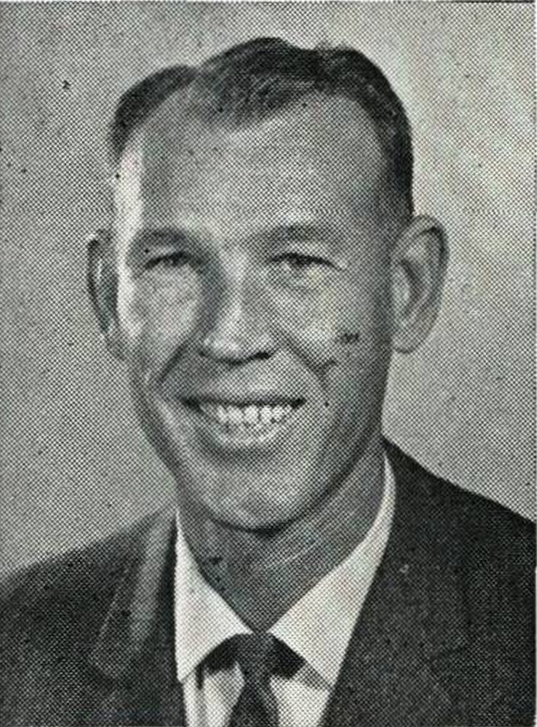
Head coach Bill Menefee, c. 1964

Baylor men's teams won five conference championships in the former Southwest Conference (1932, 1946, 1948, 1949*, 1950*; * denotes shared title). The Bears reached the NCAA Tournament for the first time in 1946, and reached the Final Four in 1948 and 1950. Bill Henderson's 1948 team advanced to play the Kentucky Wildcats for the NCAA championship, but fell 58–42 to Adolph Rupp's first national championship team. The team again advanced to the NCAA Final Four in 1950 under Henderson losing to the Bradley Braves 68–66.

Henderson would have only two more winning seasons in the decade after making the Final Four. The subpar records of Henderson's latter tenure would become the norm for Baylor in the second half of the 20th century. Bill Menefee (1961–1973) was the only coach over the next 50 years to have a career record of over .500. He would lead the Bears to a national ranking in 1969 but failed to make the postseason that year. Menefee would later serve as Baylor's athletic director in the 1980s. Gene Iba's 1988 NCAA Tournament team would be the first NCAA Tournament appearance for the program in 38 years.

=== 2003 scandal ===
The men's basketball program was plagued by a scandal in 2003. Patrick Dennehy, a player for the team, was murdered by former teammate Carlton Dotson; then-coach Dave Bliss was forced to resign amidst allegations that he had violated NCAA rules by making financial payments to four players and that he made improper statements to the media characterizing Dennehy as a drug dealer. The school placed itself on probation, limited itself to 7 scholarships for two years and imposed a post-season ban for one year. Additionally, the NCAA further punished the team by initiating a non-conference ban for the 2005–06 season and extending the probationary period during which the school would have limited recruiting privileges.

=== Recent resurgence ===
Thanks to the scandal, the 2005 Bears were hindered by only having 7 scholarship players and recorded only one win in conference play. From 2003 to 2007, the Bears would only win a total of 36 games. In spite of these challenges, head coach Scott Drew was able to put together a 2005 signing class ranked No. 7 nationally by HoopScoop.

However, Drew engineered a very quick return to respectability. In 2008, the Bears reached the NCAA Tournament for the first time in 20 years with a 9–7 conference record and the team's first national ranking in 39 years. The January 23, 2008 116–110 5OT win over Texas A&M at College Station officially became the longest game in Big 12 history. The 2008–09 team again was ranked early in the season but stumbled to a 5–11 conference finish before heating up in the Big 12 Tournament defeating both Kansas and Texas en route to the championship game versus Missouri, and lost by a score of 73–60. The 2008–09 team recorded the program's first postseason victory since 1950 in its first round NIT victory over the Georgetown Hoyas in Waco.

The 2008–09 team went on to advance to the NIT Final where they fell to Penn State. The 2009–10 squad was again ranked in both polls and pulled off the biggest road win in school history over the then #6 Texas Longhorns in Austin 80–77 on Jan. 30th. The Bears closed out the season with a Big 12 era best 11–5 record and #3 seed in the Big 12 Tournament.

The 2009–10 team was picked to finish 10th in the Big 12 in the Big 12 Coaches poll due to the graduation of several key players from the previous year. However, the team finished the regular season 23–6 and tied for 2nd in the Big 12 standings. Following a 2–1 record at the Big 12 tournament, the Bears were rewarded with a #3 seed in the South Region of the NCAA Tournament. The Bears defeated #14 seed Sam Houston State 68–59 in First round action and then defeated #11 seed Old Dominion 76–68 in Second round play to advance to the Sweet 16 hosted at Reliant Stadium in Houston. The Bears' Sweet 16 match-up was #10 seed Saint Mary's, which had defeated #2 seed Villanova the previous week to advance to the Sweet 16. The Bears won handily over the Gaels, 72–49, after leading 47–19 at the half. The Elite Eight was also held at Reliant Stadium and the Bears' opponent was the #1 seed Duke Blue Devils, the last #1 seed standing in the NCAA Tournament after the other three #1 seeds (Kansas, Syracuse, and Kentucky) were all defeated by lower seeded teams. In front of a very pro-Baylor crowd of over 47,000, the Bears were defeated by the Duke Blue Devils, 78–71, to end the magical run to the Elite Eight. It was the best season in the Scott Drew era as defined by conference standing, overall ranking, wins, and NCAA Tournament wins. The Bears finished the season ranked #10 in the final ESPN/Coaches poll—the highest ranking in program history at that time.

The 2010–11 team started the season ranked 14th (according to the AP Preseason poll). The Bears began 7–0, and rose to 9th in the polls before falling to Gonzaga at a neutral court in Dallas. The team finished 18–13 overall and 7–9 in league play. The highlight of the season was LaceDarius Dunn becoming the Big 12's all-time leading scorer, and a sweep of the series versus ranked Texas A&M. After freshman star Perry Jones III was suspended by the NCAA for six games, the Bears proceeded to lose their first-round game of the Big 12 Tournament against Oklahoma.

The 2012 season saw another historic campaign for the Bears as they followed up the 2011 season with another successful conference run which saw the Bears win 30 games and make it to the Big 12 tournament title game, but eventually losing to the Missouri Tigers. The Bears were selected for the NCAA Tournament and made it all the way to the Elite Eight, which ended in a loss to eventual national champion Kentucky.

The 2013 season witnesses another winning campaign for the Bears as they followed up the 2012 Elite Eight season with another successful conference run which saw the Bears sweep both TCU and Texas Tech while only dropping one game to UT. The Bears started out with a pre-season ranking of #19 in the country. The Bears finish conference play at .500 and were selected for the NIT tournament. The Bears made it all the way to the final, which ended in a win over Iowa, winning the tournament before a large crowd in Madison Square Garden and claiming the 2013 NIT Title.

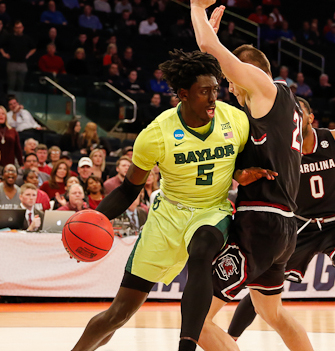
Johnathan Motley drives against Maik Kotsar in 2017

The 2016–17 season saw one of the best starts in Baylor history, going 15–0 with wins over #4 Oregon, #24 Michigan State, #10 Louisville, and #7 Xavier. On January 9, Baylor would reach AP #1 for the first time in program history, although they would fall to #10 West Virginia that same day. Baylor remained within the top 12 for the remainder of the season and would finish 25–6, 12–6 in conference. They would fall to Iowa State in the first round of the Big 12 Tournament and receive a #3 seed in the 2017 NCAA tournament. Baylor would get to the Sweet Sixteen before being eliminated by South Carolina.

The 2019–20 season is considered one of the greatest in program history. They came into the season ranked #16 in the nation, but would fall to #24 after losing to Washington in the Armed Forces Classic. The Bears followed this loss with a 23-game win streak, including 6 ranked victories and a rise to #1 in the country. On January 11, Baylor defeated #3 Kansas on the road, winning in Lawrence for the first time in school history. Baylor's impressive start to the season ended on a sour note, losing 3 of their last 5 games before the Big 12 tournament. Baylor would finish the regular season 26–4 with a 15–3 conference mark, the most wins they had recorded in conference play, and remained ranked within the top 5 for the back half of the season. The NCAA Tournament would be canceled amid the COVID-19 pandemic, however numerous bracketologist considered the Bears as a 1-seed and had the potential to reach the Final Four.

In 2021, with the Bears’ help of soon-to-be consensus All-American Jared Butler, Baylor defeated Hartford, Wisconsin, Villanova, and Arkansas to reach their first Final Four since 1950, where they defeated the in-state Houston Cougars, to reach the NCAA championship, where they defeated Gonzaga, winning their first title in school history, and spoiling the Bulldogs’ then-perfect season in the process.

== Facilities ==
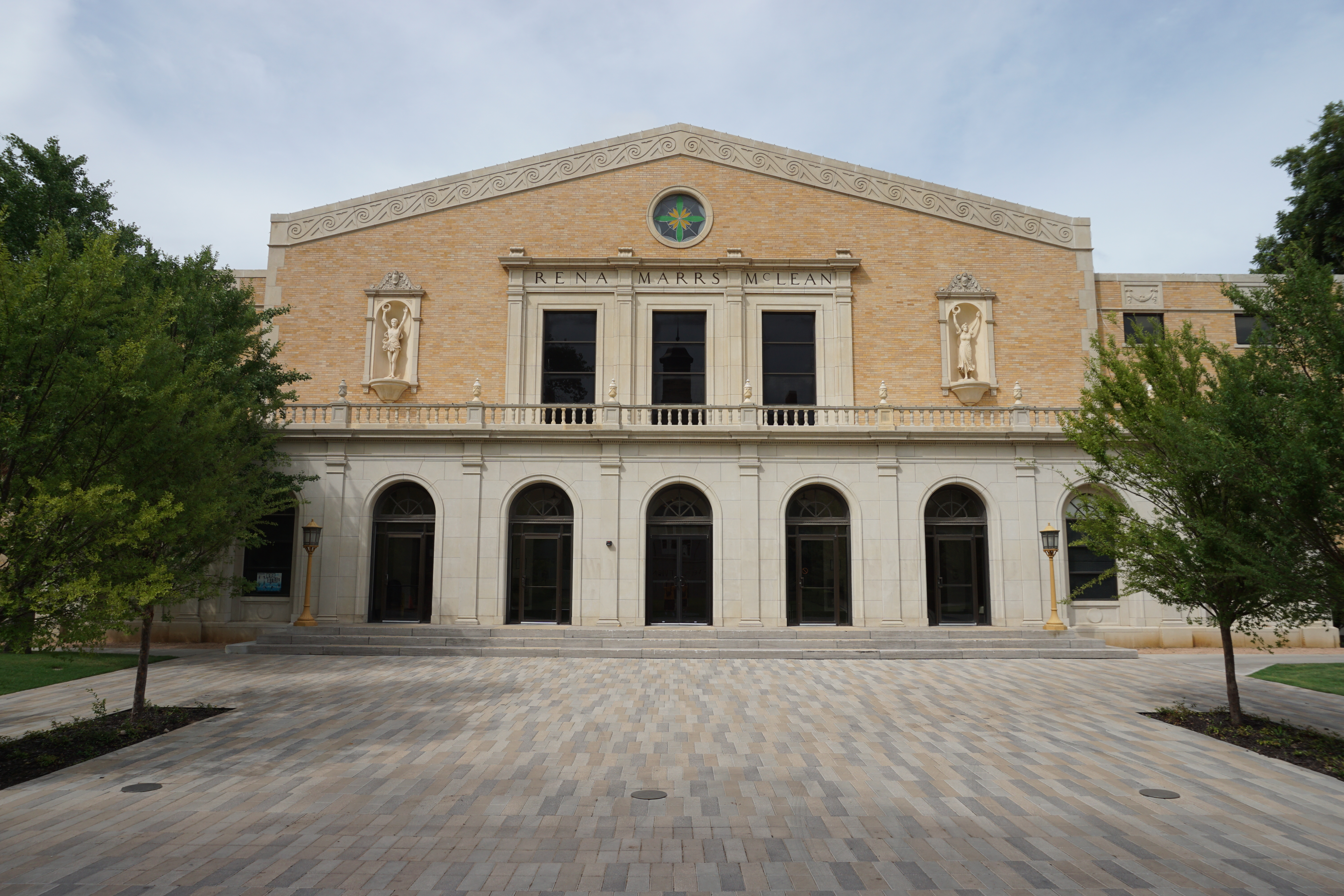
Rena Marrs McLean Gymnasium, home of Baylor basketball from 1938 to 1953

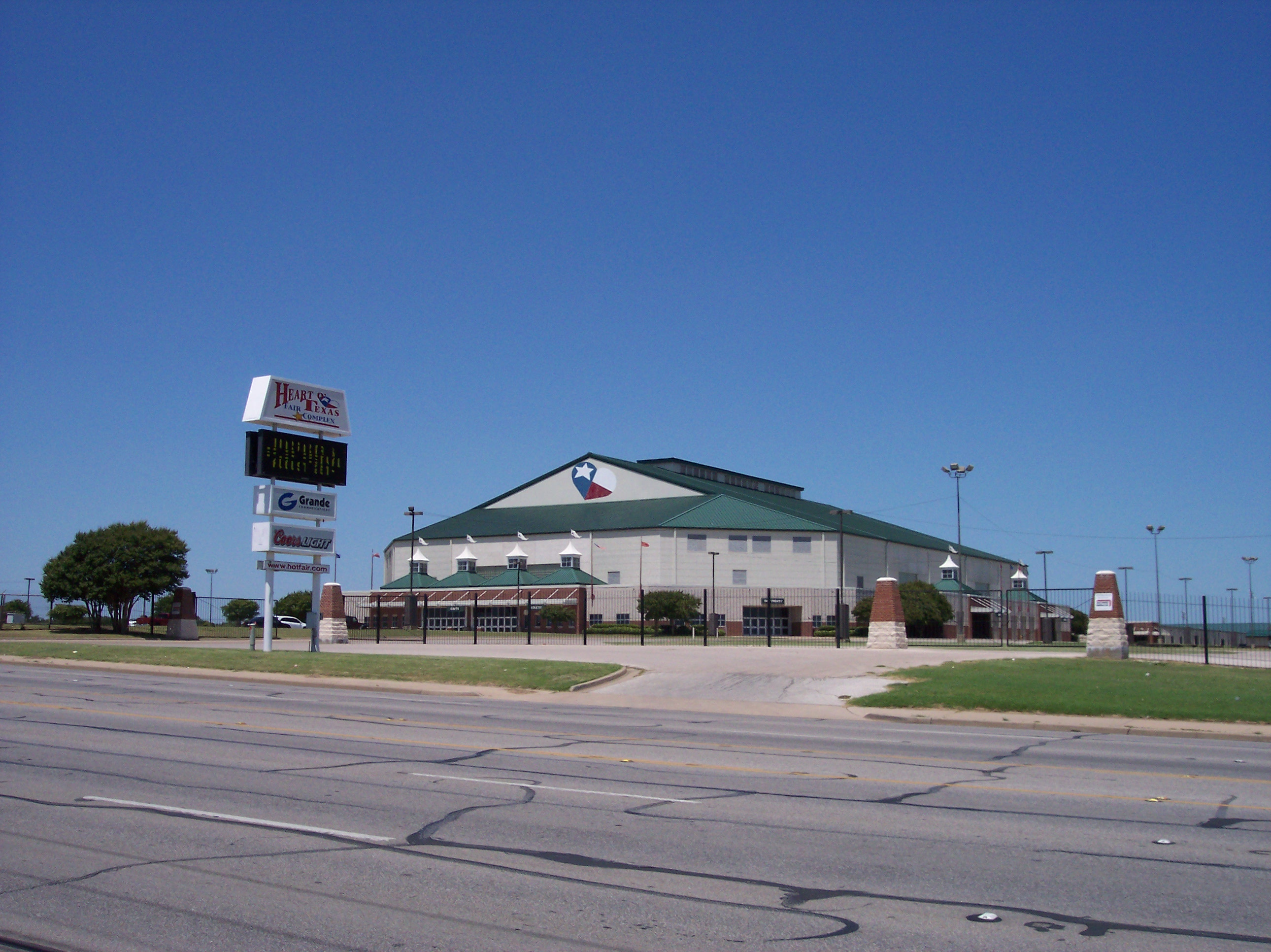
The Heart O'Texas Coliseum in Waco, former site of Baylor basketball home games from 1953 to 1988

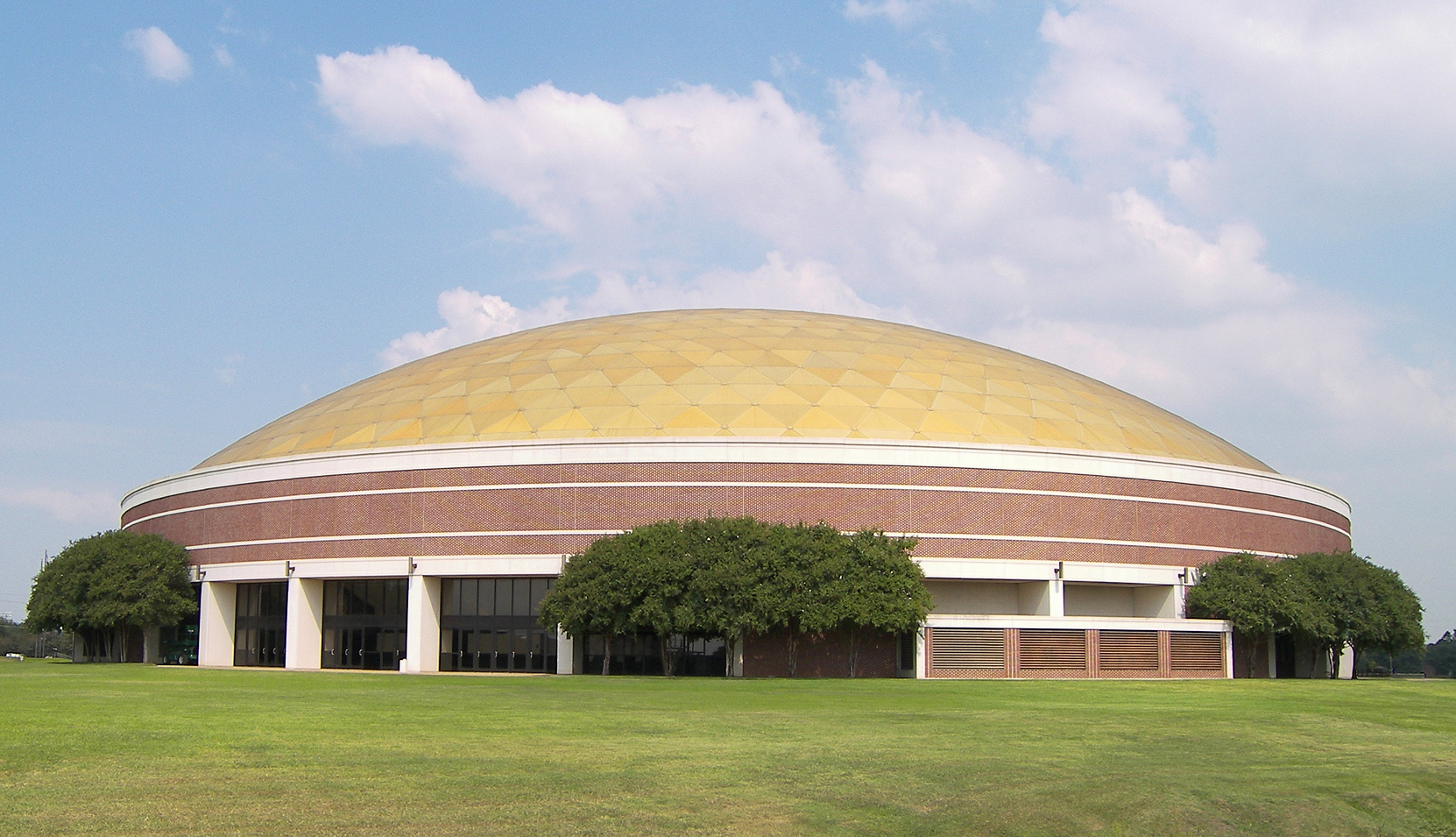
Ferrell Center in Waco, former site of Baylor basketball home games from 1988 to 2024

In its early days, Marrs McLean Gym was Baylor's basketball home, and doubled as the site of many physical education classes. Marrs McLean Gymnasium was built in 1938 and still stands on campus today.

The Heart O' Texas Fair Complex, now known as the Extraco Events Center, is located in Waco, Texas. It was once the prime basketball facility for Baylor University and was used from 1953 to 1988. The H.O.T Coliseum was constructed after McLennan County voters authorized a bond issue of $1.2 million in the early 1950s.

Starting in 1988, the Bears played their home games at the Ferrell Center, adjacent to the Brazos River. It is named for Charles R. Ferrell, a Baylor student and legacy who died in 1967, and whose family's estate was a major benefactor of the arena. The main arena, Paul J. Meyer Arena, seats 10,284 people.

In June 2022, Baylor began construction on the Foster Pavilion to replace the Ferrell Center as the new permanent home for both the men's and women's basketball teams. The arena held its first game on January 2, 2024, where Baylor defeated Cornell.

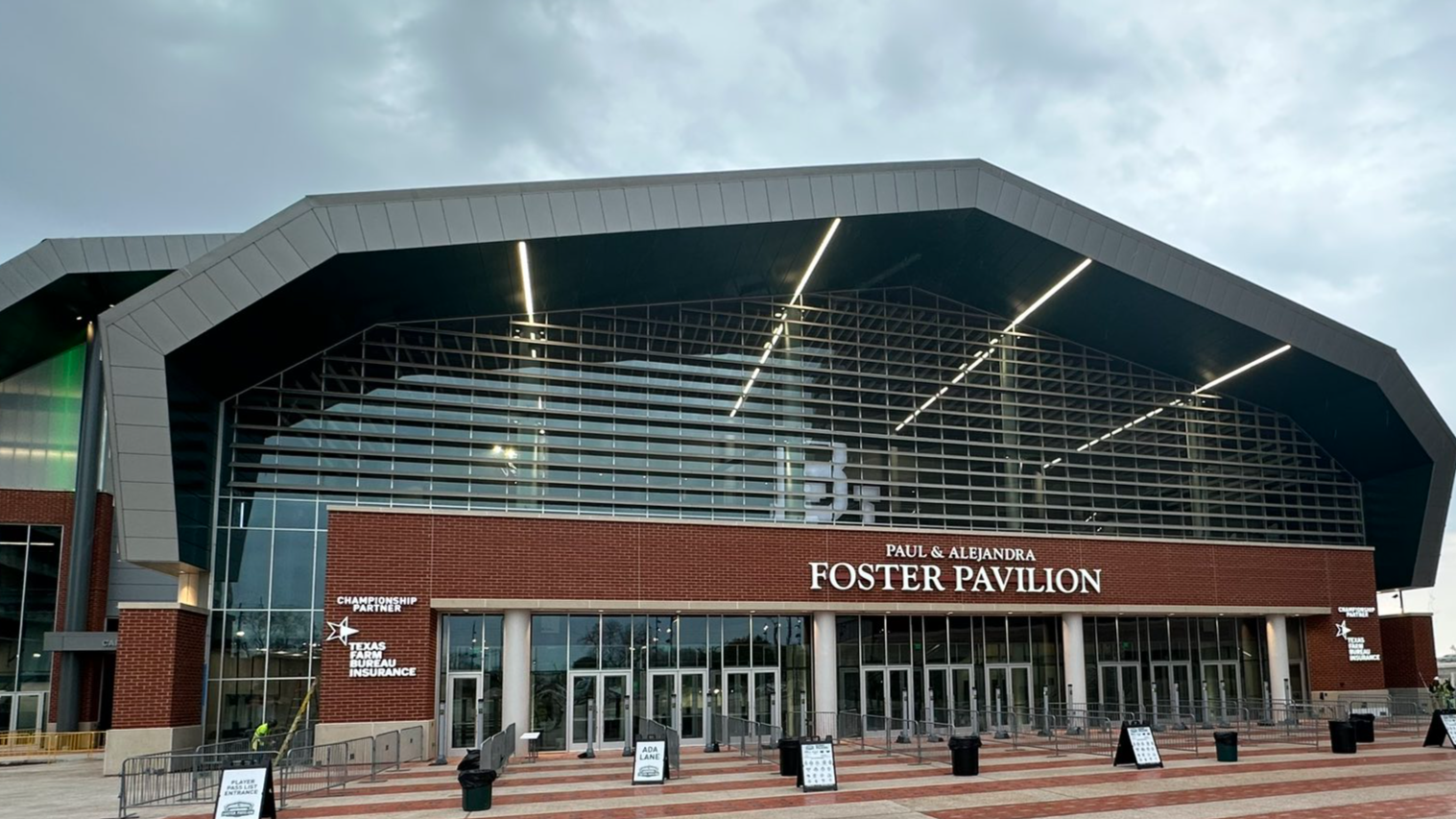
Foster Pavilion, current home of Baylor basketball, opened in 2024

== Coaching records ==
Baylor coaching record (through 4/6/2021)
Coach	Years coached	Seasons	Wins	Losses	Percentage	Conference titles	NCAA	NIT
Luther Burleson	1906–1908	2	10	9	.526	—	—	—
Enoch Mills	1908–1910	2	19	10	.655	—	—	—
Ralph Glaze	1910–1913	3	26	7	.788	—	—	—
Norman Paine	1913–1914	1	1	8	.111	—	—	—
Charles Moseley	1914–1920	6	28	65	.301	0	—	—
Frank Bridges	1920–1926	6	52	77	.403	0	—	—
Ralph Wolf	1926–1941	15	148	129	.534	1	0	0
Bill Henderson	1941–1943 and 1945–1961	18	201	233	.463	4	3	0
Van Sweet	1943–1945	2	6	23	.207	0	0	0
Jeff Mangold	1945	1	0	6	.000	0	0	0
Bill Menefee	1961–1973	12	149	144	.509	0	0	0
Carroll Dawson	1973–1977	4	44	51	.463	0	0	0
Jim Haller	1977–1985	8	102	130	.440	0	0	0
Gene Iba	1985–1992	7	98	106	.480	0	1	2
Darrell Johnson	1992–1994	2	32	22	.596	0	0	0
Harry Miller	1994–1999	5	56	87	.392	0	0	0
Dave Bliss	1999–2003	4	61	57	.517	0	0	1
Scott Drew	2003–Present	20	372	215	.634	2	10	3
TOTALS		115	1405	1379	.505	7	14	6

=== NCAA national championships ===
Season	Coach	Site	Championship Game result	Most Outstanding Player	Overall record	Big 12 record
2020–21	Scott Drew	Indianapolis	Baylor 86, Gonzaga 70	Jared Butler	28–2	13–1
Total NCAA National championships: 1

== Postseason results ==
=== NCAA tournament results ===
The Bears have appeared in the NCAA tournament 16 times. Their combined record is 24–18. They were National Champions in 2021.

Year	Seed	Round	Opponent	Result
1946	N/A	Quarterfinals; Regional 3rd Place	Oklahoma A&M; Colorado	L 29–44; L 44–59
1948	N/A	Quarterfinals; Final Four; National Championship	Washington; Kansas State; Kentucky	W 64–62; W 60–52; L 42–58
1950	N/A	Quarterfinals; Final Four; 3rd-place game	BYU; Bradley; North Carolina State	W 56–55; L 66–68; L 41–53
1988	8	First round	(9) Memphis State	L 60–75
2008	11	First round	(6) Purdue	L 79–90
2010	3	First round Second round Sweet Sixteen; Elite Eight	(14) Sam Houston State (11) Old Dominion (10) Saint Mary's (1) Duke	W 68–59; W 76–68; W 72–49; L 71–78
2012	3	First round Second round Sweet Sixteen; Elite Eight	(14) South Dakota State (11) Colorado (10) Xavier (1) Kentucky	W 68–60; W 80–63; W 75–70; L 70–82
2014	6	First round Second round Sweet Sixteen	(11) Nebraska (3) Creighton (2) Wisconsin	W 74–60; W 85–55; L 52–69
2015	3	First round	(14) Georgia State	L 56–57
2016	5	First round	(12) Yale	L 75–79
2017	3	First round Second round Sweet Sixteen	(14) New Mexico State (11) USC (7) South Carolina	W 91–73; W 82–78; L 50–70
2019	9	First round Second round	(8) Syracuse (1) Gonzaga	W 78–69; L 83–71
2021	1	First round Second round Sweet Sixteen; Elite Eight; Final Four; National Championship	(16) Hartford (9) Wisconsin (5) Villanova (3) Arkansas (2) Houston (1) Gonzaga	W 79–55; W 76–63; W 62–51; W 81–72; W 78–59; W 86–70
2022	1	First round Second round	(16) Norfolk State (8) North Carolina	W 85–49; L 86–93^{OT}
2023	3	First round Second round	(14) UC Santa Barbara (6) Creighton	W 74–56; L 76–85
2024	3	First round Second round	(14) Colgate (6) Clemson	W 92–67; L 72–64
2025	9	First round Second round	(8) Mississippi State (1) Duke	W 75–72; L 66–89

=== NIT results ===
The Bears have appeared in the National Invitation Tournament (NIT) six times. Their combined record is 10–5. They were NIT champions in 2013.

Year	Round	Opponent	Result
1987	First round	Arkansas–Little Rock	L 41–42
1990	First round	Mississippi State	L 75–84
2001	First round	New Mexico	L 73–83
2009	First round Second round Quarterfinals; Semifinals; Final	Georgetown; Virginia Tech; Auburn; San Diego State; Penn State	W 74–72; W 84–66; W 74–72; W 76–62; L 63–69
2013	First round Second round Quarterfinals; Semifinals; Final	Long Beach State; Arizona State; Providence; BYU; Iowa	W 112–76; W 89–86; W 79–68; W 76–70; W 74–54
2018	First round Second round	Wagner; Mississippi State	W 80–59; L 77–78

=== CBC results ===
The Bears have appeared in one College Basketball Crown (CBC). Their record is 1–1.

Year	Round	Opponent	Result
2026	Quarterfinals; Semifinals	Minnesota; Oklahoma	W 67–48; L 69–82

== Old Fight ==
Old Fight refers to the Baylor fight song, enacted in the mid-1950s.

Bear down you Bears of old Baylor U,
We're all for you (GO BEARS)
We're gonna show dear old Baylor spirit
Through and through (GO BEARS)
Come on and fight them with all your might
You Bruins bold
And win all our victories for the Green and Gold!
(spellout) B – A – Y – L – O – R
Baylor Bears Fight!
Come on and fight them with all your might
You Bruins bold
And win all our victories for the Green and Gold!
BAY – LOR – Baylor Bears Fight!

== Players ==
=== All-Americans ===
Player	Year(s)	Team(s)
Hubert Kirkpatrick	1938	Helms (1st), NEA (2nd)
Jackie Robinson	1946	Helms (2nd)
Jackie Robinson	1948	Helms (2nd)
Vinnie Johnson	1979	AP (2nd)
Terry Teagle	1982	AP (2nd)
Johnathan Motley	2017	Consensus Second Team – AP (2nd), USBWA (2nd), NABC (2nd), Sporting News (2nd)
Jared Butler	2020	AP (3rd), USBWA (3rd), NABC (3rd), Sporting News (3rd)
Jared Butler	2021	Consensus First Team – AP (1st), USBWA (1st), NABC (1st), Sporting News (1st)
Davion Mitchell	2021	AP (3rd), NABC (3rd), Sporting News (3rd)
James Akinjo	2022	AP (3rd), USBWA (3rd), NABC (3rd), Sporting News (3rd)

=== Career scoring leaders ===
Records as of the 2021–22 season

Rank	Name	Seasons	Points
1	LaceDarius Dunn	2007–2011	2,285
2	Terry Teagle	1979–1982	2,189
3	Micheal Williams	1985–1988	1,854
4	Curtis Jerrells	2005–2009	1,820
5	Brian Skinner	1994–1998	1,702
6	Darryl Middleton	1985–1988	1,677
7	Aundre Branch	1991–1995	1,666
8	Tweety Carter	2006–2010	1,447
9	Kevin Rogers	2005–2009	1,371
T10	Darrell Hardy	1965–1967	1,360
T10	Quincy Acy	2008–2012	1,360

=== NBA draft selections ===
Baylor has had 27 former players selected in the NBA draft:

- Quincy Acy, 2012
- Carlos Briggs, 1986
- Kendall Brown, 2022
- Jared Butler, 2021
- Spencer Carlson, 1965
- William Chatmon, 1971
- V. J. Edgecombe, 2025
- Keyonte George, 2023
- Darrell Hardy, 1967
- Don Heathington, 1950
- Alex Holcombe, 1993
- Pierre Jackson, 2013
- Cory Jefferson, 2014
- Vinnie Johnson, 1979
- Perry Jones, 2012
- Jerry Mallett, 1957
- Darryl Middleton, 1988
- Quincy Miller, 2012
- Yves Missi, 2024
- Davion Mitchell, 2021
- Red Owens, 1949
- Taurean Prince, 2016
- Brian Skinner 1998
- Jeremy Sochan, 2022
- Terry Teagle, 1982
- Ekpe Udoh, 2010
- Ja'Kobe Walter, 2024
- Micheal Williams, 1988

== Bears playing in international leagues ==
- James Akinjo, playing in the Liga ACB.
- Jared Butler, playing in the Basketball League of Serbia
- Allerik Freeman, playing in the Greek Basketball League
- Freddie Gillespie, playing in the Israeli Basketball Premier League

== See also ==
- NCAA Men's Division I Final Four appearances by coaches
