= List of people from Dallas =

The following is a list of notable people who were born, or who have lived a significant portion of their lives in Dallas, Texas.

== A ==
- Vinnie Paul Abbott (1964–2018), musician
- Kat Abughazaleh (born 1999), journalist
- Amy Acker (born 1976), actress
- Jensen Ackles (born 1978), actor
- Mike Agnew (born 1965), soccer player
- Brad Agoos (born 1970 or 1971), soccer player
- Jeff Agoos (born 1968), Swiss-born American soccer defender
- Troy Aikman (born 1966), NFL player and sportscaster
- LaMarcus Aldridge (born 1985), basketball player
- Paul Alexander (1946–2024), lawyer, writer, polio survivor
- Bruce Alger (1918–2015), former U.S. representative for Texas's 5th congressional district
- Abby Anderson (born 1997), country singer
- Ashley Parker Angel (born 1981), recording artist and actor
- AnonymousCulture (born 1985, né Anttwon Jemon Thames IV), rapper
- Heather Armbrust (born 1977), International Fitness and Bodybuilding Federation (IFBB) professional bodybuilder
- Darrell Arthur (born 1988), basketball player
- Aaron Aryanpur, stand-up comedian
- Karan Ashley (born 1975), actress; known for her role as Aisha in the superhero television series Mighty Morphin Power Rangers
- Ariel Atkins (born 1996), Women's National Basketball Association (WNBA) shooting guard for the Washington Mystics
- Tex Avery (1908–1980), cartoonist
- Carlos Avilez (born 1999), soccer player

== B ==
- Harry Babasin (1921–1988), musician
- Milo Backus (1932–2018), geophysicist
- Erykah Badu (born 1971), singer
- Jerry Bailey (born 1957), Hall of Fame jockey
- Troy Baker (born 1976), alternative-rock guitarist and singer, voice actor for video games, film and television actor
- Ernie Banks (1931–2015), Hall of Fame baseball player
- Sebastian Barrie (born 1970), football player
- Clyde Barrow (1909–1934), outlaw (Bonnie and Clyde)
- Steve Bartlett (born 1947), 55th mayor of Dallas (1991–1995), U.S. representative from Texas's 3rd congressional district (1983–1991)
- John Battaglia (1955–2018), child killer; executed by lethal injection
- Tony Battie (born 1976), NBA basketball player
- Lou Singletary Bedford (1837–1920; pen name: Lenora), editor, non-fiction writer, poet, songwriter
- Yella Beezy (né Markies Deandre Conway, born 1991), rapper
- Jim Benedek (1941–2009), soccer player and coach
- Robby Benson (born 1956), actor
- Drew Binsky (born 1991), vlogger
- Charlie Blackmon (born 1986), baseball player for the Colorado Rockies
- Marques Bolden (born 1009), basketball player
- Elton Bomer (born 1935), politician
- Tommy Bond (1926–2005), actor (Butch from Our Gang series of comedy short films)
- Kevin Bonilla (born 2001), soccer player
- Chris Bosh (born 1984), basketball player
- Charles Anthony Boyd (1959—1999), serial killer; executed by lethal injection
- Charlie Brackins (1932–1991), NFL football player
- Doyle Bramhall II (born 1968), guitarist, singer and composer
- Drew Brees (born 1979), NFL football player
- Edie Brickell (born 1966), singer
- Messiah Bright (born 2000), soccer player
- Paul Broome (born 1976), soccer player
- Rex Brown (born 1964), musician
- Tim Brown (born 1966), Hall of Fame football player
- Freddie Bruno (born 1978), Christian rapper
- John Neely Bryan (1810–1877), founder of Dallas
- José Burciaga Jr. (born 1981), soccer player
- David Burns (born 1958), basketball player

== C ==
- K Callan (born 1936), actress
- Henry Calvin (1918–1975), actor (Sergeant Garcia on Disney's television series Zorro)
- Tevin Campbell (born 1976), singer
- Jordan Cano (born 1996), soccer player
- Gina Carano (born 1982), Muay Thai and mixed martial arts fighter, actress
- Jason Castro (born 1987), singer
- Arden Cho (born 1985), actress
- Annie Clark (born 1982), musician
- Ramsey Clark (1927–2021), U.S. Attorney General
- Tom C. Clark (1899–1977), associate justice of the U.S. Supreme Court
- Kelly Clarkson (born 1982), singer-songwriter
- Bill Clements (1917–2011), 42nd and 44th governor of Texas (1979–1983, 1987–1992) and businessman
- Neil Cohen (born 1955), soccer player who represented the United States national team
- John Ford Coley (born 1948), singer-songwriter
- John Congleton (born 1977), music producer
- Kerry Cooks (born 1974), football coach
- Pat Corley (1930–2006), actor (Murphy Brown television series)
- Jasmine Crockett (born 1981), U.S. representative and former Texas state representative
- Rafael Cruz (born 1939), Christian preacher and public speaker; father of Texas Senator Ted Cruz
- Mark Cuban (born 1958), businessman, entrepreneur and owner of the Dallas Mavericks

== D ==
- George Dahl (1894–1987), architect
- Vernon Dalhart (1883–1948), singer
- Bebe Daniels (1901–1971), child silent-film actress; later became film, radio, stage, television actress
- Darrion Daniels (born 1997), defensive tackle for the Atlanta Falcons
- Bettye Danoff (1923–2011), golfer, LPGA co-founder
- Linda Darnell (1923–1965), actress
- Sahara Davenport (1984–2012), drag queen
- Storm Davis (born 1961, né George Earl Davis), MLB baseball player
- George Dealey (1859–1946), businessman
- Samuel David Dealey (1906–1944), World War II Congressional Medal of Honor recipient
- Tim DeLaughter (born 1965), from the rock band The Polyphonic Spree
- Dimebag Darrell (1966–2004, né Darrell Abbott), guitarist and songwriter
- DJ Hurricane (born 1965, né Wendell Timothy Fite), hip-hop disc jockey and producer
- The D.O.C. (born 1968), rapper
- Asian Doll (born 1996), rapper
- Dorrough (born 1986), rapper
- Leon Dorsey (1975–2008), serial killer
- Emira D'Spain (born 1996), model and social-media influencer
- Dave Duncan (born 1945), MLB baseball player and coach
- Jeff Dunham (born 1962), ventriloquist
- Alex Duong (1984–2026), comedian and television actor
- Pat Durham (born 1967), basketball player

== E ==
- Andre Emmett (1982–2019), basketball player
- Jane Johnson Endsley (1848–1933), ran one of the city's largest rail-yard coal and log businesses
- Emily Erwin (born 1972), musician (country-music band Dixie Chicks)
- Martie Erwin (born 1969), musician (country-music band Dixie Chicks)
- Forest Etheredge (1929–2004), Illinois state senator and educator
- Anthony Evans (born 1978), Christian singer-songwriter; son of Tony Evans
- Julian Eyestone (born 2006), soccer player

== F ==
- Morgan Fairchild (born 1950), actress
- Terry Fator (born 1965), ventriloquist
- Dean Fearing, chef
- Miles Fisher (born 1983), actor
- Melinda French Gates (born 1964), businesswoman, philanthropist; ex-wife of Bill Gates

== G ==
- Riley Gale (1986–2020), musician
- Randy Galloway (born 1943), sports journalist
- Kyle Gann (born 1955), music critic
- Red Garland (1923–1984), jazz pianist
- Lane Garrison (born 1980), actor
- Lester Gatewood (1921–1965), football player
- Don Gililland (born 1939), guitarist
- Peri Gilpin (born 1961), actress
- Xavier Gipson, NFL player
- Selena Gomez (born 1992), singer
- Omar Gonzalez (born 1988), soccer player
- YaYa Gosselin (born 2009), actress
- W. V. Grant (born 1945), televangelist
- A. J. Green (born 1998), NFL player
- Cecil Green (1919–1951), race-car driver
- AJ Griffin (born 2003), NBA player
- Frank Shelby Groner (1873–1943), executive secretary of the Baptist General Convention of Texas (1918–1928)

== H ==
- Jenna Bush Hager (born 1981), journalist
- Joe Hahn (born 1977), musician, DJ, director, and visual artist for the nu-metal band Linkin Park
- Elizabeth Forsythe Hailey (born 1938), writer
- Jack Halliday (1928–2000), football player
- William Jackson Harper (born 1980), comedic actor, playwright
- Chris Harrison (born 1971), television host (The Bachelor, Designers' Challenge)
- Will Ford Hartnett (born 1956), attorney; state representative (1991–2013)
- Brad Hawkins (born 1976), actor (Ryan Steele on the television series VR Troopers)
- Gibby Haynes (born 1957), singer and other instrumentalist with the rock band Butthole Surfers
- Jerry Haynes (1927–2011), children's television-show host (Mr. Peppermint, Peppermint Place)
- Josh Henderson (born 1981), actor (John Ross on the television series Dallas)
- Nekeshia Henderson (born 1973), basketball player
- Don Henley (born 1947), musician
- Grant Hill (born 1972), Naismith Memorial Basketball Hall of Fame basketball player; vice chair of the board for the Atlanta Hawks
- Barron Hilton (1927–2019), chief executive officer of Hilton Hotels; co-founder of the American Football League; grandfather of Paris Hilton
- Conrad Hilton, Jr. (1926–1969, known as Nicky Hilton), hotel heir; airline director; first husband of Elizabeth Taylor
- Dustin Hodge, producer and writer
- Terri Hoffman (1938–2015), religious-cult leader
- "Doc" Holliday (1851–1887), western gunfighter, gambler, and dentist; lived in Dallas in the 1870s
- Joyner Holmes (born 1998), Women's National Basketball Association (WNBA) power forward for the Seattle Storm
- Steve Holy (born 1972), country singer
- Jordan Horston (born 2001), Women's National Basketball Association (WNBA) guard for the Seattle Storm
- Jaden Hossler (born 2001), TikTok personality and singer
- Tina Huang (born 1981), actress (television series Rizzoli & Isles)
- Ray Wylie Hubbard (born 1946), musician
- Michael Huffington (born 1947), politician, activist; ex-husband of Arianna Huffington
- Sarah T. Hughes (1896–1985), judge
- Prince Albert Hunt (1896–1931), musician
- Ryan Hunter-Reay (born 1980), indy-car driver
- Paige Hurd (born 1992), actress (Tasha on the television series Everybody Hates Chris)
- Willie Hutch (1944–2005), singer
- Kay Bailey Hutchison (born 1943), U.S. senator from Texas (1993–2013), 24th U.S. permanent representative to NATO (2017–2021)
- Emerson Hyndman (born 1996), soccer player for Atlanta United

== J ==
- Bishop T. D. Jakes (born 1957), pastor (senior pastor of The Potter's Housevar)
- Blind Lemon Jefferson (1893–1929), musician
- Moriah Jefferson (born 1994), Women's National Basketball Association (WNBA) player
- Eric Johnson (born 1975), 60th mayor of Dallas (since 2019)
- Eddie Bernice Johnson (1934–2023), U.S. representative from Texas's 30th congressional district (1993–2033), Texas state senator (1987–1993), and Texas state representative (1973–1977)
- Michael Johnson (born 1967), athlete; Olympic gold medalist
- Nick Jonas (born 1992), singer
- Alex Jones (born 1974), conservative talk-radio host
- Caleb Landry Jones (born 1989), actor
- Jalen Jones (born 1993), basketball player for Hapoel Haifa (in the Israeli Basketball Premier League)
- Lindsay Jones (born 1989), gamer, actor
- Margo Jones (1911–1955), stage director and producer
- Norah Jones (born 1979), singer
- Ron Jones (born 1947), football player
- J. Erik Jonsson (1901–1995), co-founder of Texas Instruments; politician

== K ==
- Christian Kane (born 1972), actor
- Kankan (born 2000), rapper
- Bavand Karim (born 1979), film and television producer
- Ty Kelly (born 1988), American-Israeli MLB player (New York Mets)
- Charlie Kelman (born 2001), soccer player
- Clayton Kershaw (born 1988), MLB pitcher (Los Angeles Dodgers)
- Jack Kilby (1923–2005), co-inventor of the integrated circuit, Nobel Prize in Physics laureate
- Kim Chung-ha (born 1996), previous member of the South Korean girl group I.O.I; lived in Dallas for eight years before returning to South Korea
- Don King (born 1964), football player
- Freddie King (1934–1976), musician
- Ron Kirk (born 1954), politician
- Madison Kocian (born 1997), gymnast at the 2016 Summer Olympics
- Linda Koop (born 1950), Republican member of Texas House of Representatives
- Kelvin Korver (born 1949), football player

== L ==
- Brandon Lake (born 1990), musician
- Tom Landry (1924–2000), Dallas Cowboys coach
- Xavier Landum (born 1998), rapper
- James Lankford (born 1968), U.S. senator from Oklahoma (since 2015)
- Alonzo Lawrence (born 1989), football player
- Bobby Layne (1926–1986), football player
- Zach LeDay (born 1994), Israeli Basketball Premier League player
- John N. Leedom (1921–2011), politician
- Logan Leistikow (born 1984), filmmaker
- Turney W. Leonard (1921–1944), World War II Congressional Medal of Honor recipient
- Gus Levene (1911–1979), composer, arranger, orchestrator, guitarist
- Jaren Lewison (born 2000), actor
- Lil Loaded (2000–2021), rapper
- Lil Twist (born 1993), rapper
- Lil' Wil (born 1987), rapper
- Bob Lilly (born 1939), football player
- Maggie Lindemann (born 1998), musician
- Al Lipscomb (1925–2011), politician, civil-rights advocate
- Nastia Liukin (born 1989), gymnast
- Liv.e (born 1998), musician
- Myra Cohn Livingston (1926–1996), poet
- Lisa Loeb (born 1968), singer
- Greg Lopez (born 1964), U.S. House representative for Colorado's 4th congressional district (2024–2025)
- Trini Lopez (1937–2020), singer
- Demi Lovato (born 1992), singer, songwriter and actress (born in Albuquerque)
- Big Lurch (born 1976), rapper

== M ==
- Daniel Mac (born 1997), internet personality
- Peter MacNicol (born 1954), actor
- Jayne Mansfield (1933–1967), actress, graduate of Dallas's Highland Park High School
- Stephanie March (born 1974), actress (Law and Order: Special Victims Unit, Conviction)
- Minnie Lichtenstein Marcus (1882–1979), co-founder, Neiman Marcus
- Stanley Marcus (1905–2002), chairman, Neiman Marcus
- Mark Matlock, minister
- MC 900 Ft. Jesus (born 1957, né Mark Thomas Griffin), musician
- Randy McAllister, blues musician
- Michael McCaul (born 1962), U.S. House representative for Texas's 10th congressional district
- Jake McDorman (born 1986), actor
- George McFarland (1928–1993), actor (Spanky in the Our Gang series of comedy short films)
- Phil McGraw (born 1950), doctor and television personality (Dr. Phil)
- Kevin McHale (born 1988), actor
- Billy McKinney (born 1994), baseball player
- Judith McNaught (born 1944), novelist
- Meat Loaf (1947–2022), musician
- Morgan Meyer (born 1974), state representative
- Bunny Michael (née Melisa Rincón), visual artist, musician (including rapper)
- C.J. Miles (born 1987), NBA player
- Julie Miller (born 1956), singer
- Rhett Miller (born 1970), musician
- Steve Miller (born 1943), musician
- Elizabeth Mitchell (born 1970), actress
- Kiko Mizuhara (born 1990), singer and actress
- MO3 (1992–2020, né Melvin Abdul Noble Jr.), singer (including rapper)
- Mike Modano (born 1970), hockey player
- Ritt Momney (born 1999), singer
- Kourtnee Monroe, model
- Whistlin' Alex Moore (1899–1989), musician
- Keith Moreland (born 1954), baseball player
- Belita Moreno (born 1949), actress
- Glenn Morshower (born 1959), actor
- Chaz Mulkey (born 1981), kickboxer
- Kyle Muller (born 1997), starting pitcher for the Atlanta Braves
- Michael Martin Murphey (born 1945), singer (1975 song "Wildfire")
- Mason Musso (born 1989), singer
- Mitchel Musso (born 1991), actor

== N ==
- Terence Nance (born 1982), actor, film and television director, screenwriter, video artist
- Le'Bryan Nash (born 1992), basketball player in the Israeli Basketball Premier League
- Tracey Needham (born 1967), actress
- Michael Nesmith (1942–2021), actor, multi-instrumentalist (including singer), songwriter; member, the pop-rock band The Monkees

== O ==
- Igor Olshansky (born 1982), National Football League player
- Hayley Orrantia (born 1994), actress, country-music singer-songwriter
- Lee Harvey Oswald (1939–1963), assassin of U.S. President John F. Kennedy

== P ==
- Hot Lips Page (né Oran Thaddeus Page, 1908–1954), musician
- Kevin Page (born 1958), artist, actor
- Bonnie Parker (1911–1934), outlaw (Bonnie and Clyde)
- Corey Pavin (born 1959), professional golfer
- Rudy Pena (born 1958), soccer player
- Piper Perabo (born 1976), actress
- H. Ross Perot (1930–2019), businessman, U.S. presidential candidate
- Brandon Pertzborn (born 1994), drummer
- Ben J. Pierce (born 1999), YouTuber, singer-songwriter, actor
- Jesse Plemons (born 1988), actor
- Art Powell (1937–2015), football player
- Ryan Pressly (born 1988), Major League Baseball pitcher and All-Star
- PrestonPlayz (né Preston Blaine Arsement, born 1994), YouTuber
- Mandy Price, attorney and businessperson

== R ==
- Steve Railsback (born 1945), actor
- Willis Alan Ramsey (born 1951), musician
- Jon Randall (born 1969), country singer
- Julius Randle (born 1994), NBA player
- John T. Richardson (1923–2022), priest; 9th president of DePaul University (1981–1993)
- Sha'Carri Richardson (born 2000), track and field athlete
- LeAnn Rimes (born 1982), singer (raised in Garland, a suburb of Dallas)
- Emily Robison (born 1972), country singer from the band Dixie Chicks
- Holland Roden (born 1986), actress
- Dennis Rodman (born 1961), NBA player
- Kyle Rote, Jr. (born 1950), soccer player, coach
- Scott Rothkopf, art curator
- Debby Ryan (born 1993), actress, singer
- Julien Reverchon (1837–1905), botanist

== S ==
- Mark Salling (1982–2018), actor
- Sam the Sham (né Domingo Samudio, born 1937), musician
- Deion Sanders (born 1967), former football player
- Stark Sands (born 1978), actor
- Boz Scaggs (né William Royce Scaggs, born 1944), musician
- Jim Sharp, former justice of the First Texas Court of Appeals in Houston; Dallas native
- Megan Shipman (born 1992), voice actress
- Alana Shipp, Barbadian-born American/Israeli International Fitness and Bodybuilding Federation (IFBB) professional bodybuilder
- Michelle Shocked (born 1962), singer
- Jason Siggers (born 1985), basketball player in the Israel Basketball Premier League
- Matthew Silverman (born 1976), general manager and president for baseball operations for the Tampa Bay Rays
- Ashlee Simpson (born 1984), singer (raised in Richardson, a suburb of Dallas, with her sister Jessica)
- Jessica Simpson (born 1980), singer (raised in Richardson, a suburb of Dallas, with her sister Ashlee)
- A. Maceo Smith (1903–1977, civil-rights activist
- Buster Smith (né Henry Franklin Smith, 1904–1991), musician
- Elliott Smith (1969–2003), singer
- Dan Smoot (1913–2003), Federal Bureau of Investigation agent, non-fiction writer, conservative radio and television commentator
- Terry Southern (1924–1995), writer
- Gary Spann (born 1963), football player
- Aaron Spelling (1923–2006), television producer (Charlie's Angels, The Love Boat)
- Errol Spence Jr. (born 1990), unified champion welterweight world-champion boxer
- Jordan Spieth (born 1993), golfer
- SRSQ (né Kennedy Ashlyn Wenning), musician
- Matthew Stafford (born 1988), NFL player
- Roger Staubach (born 1942), NFL player
- Sydnee Steele (born 1968), pornographic actress
- B. W. Stevenson (né Louis Charles Stevenson, 1949–1988), musician
- Stephen Stills (born 1945), musician
- Rose Stone (born 1945), keyboardist, singer
- Sly Stone (1943–2025), singer
- Troy Stoudermire (born 1990), football player
- Nikki Stringfield, guitarist (the heavy-metal bands The Iron Maidens and Before the Mourning)
- Erwin Swiney (born 1978), football player
- Noah Syndergaard (born 1992), MLB pitcher (New York Mets)

== T ==
- Sharon Tate (1943–1969), actress
- Nick Taylor (born 1998), soccer player who represented the Cambodia national team
- Travis Tedford (born 1988), actor (Spanky in the 1994 comedy film The Little Rascals)
- Mason Thames (born 2007), actor
- Elijah Thomas (born 1996), basketball player for Bnei Herzliya in the Israeli Basketball Premier League
- Robert L. Thornton (1880–1964), businessman and politician
- Jim Thurman (1935–2007), comedy writer
- Nick Thurman (born 1995), NFL football player for the Atlanta Falcons
- Neal Tiemann (born 1982), musician
- Stephen Tobolowsky (born 1951), actor
- John Tower (1925–1991), politician
- Lee Trevino (born 1939), golfer
- Cowboy Troy (born 1970), country rapper
- Jerrold B. Tunnell (1950–2022), mathematician
- Wylie Turner (born 1957), football player

== U ==
- Usher (né Usher Raymond IV, born 1978), actor, dancer, singer-songwriter
- Kamaru Usman (born 1987), mixed martial arts fighter in the Ultimate Fighting Championship (UFC)

== V ==
- Charlie Van Dyke, former radio disc jockey, frequent guest host of American Top 40, 1983–1988
- Vanilla Ice (né Robert Matthew Van Winkle, born 1967), actor, rapper, television host
- Jimmie Vaughan (born 1951), musician
- Stevie Ray Vaughan (1954–1990), musician
- Lacey Von Erich (born 1986), wrestler

== W ==
- Doak Walker (1927–1998), football player
- Malcolm Walker (1943–2022), football player
- T-Bone Walker (né Aaron Thibeaux Walker, 1910–1975), musician
- Pegot Waring (1908–1983), sculptor
- Ken Weaver (born 1956), auto racer
- J. White Did It (né Anthony Jermaine White, born 1984), record producer, songwriter, DJ
- Donnie Williams (born 1948), football player
- Travis Willingham (born 1981), voice actor
- Victor Willis (born 1951), lead singer of the disco group Village People
- Andrew Wilson (born 1964), actor, director
- Luke Wilson (born 1971), actor
- Mark Wilson (1929–2021), magician
- Owen Wilson (born 1968), actor
- Ron Woodroof (1950–1992), founder, "Dallas Buyers Club", an AIDS buyers' club
- Bracey Wright (born 1984), basketball player, guard for the Minnesota Timberwolves, Israeli Basketball Premier League
- Robin Wright (for a period, also known as Robin Wright Penn, born 1966), actress
- Angus G. Wynne (1914–1979), real-estate developer; founder, Six Flags theme parks

== Y ==
- Chris Young (born 1985), MLB pitcher

== See also ==
- List of people from Texas
