= Six Constitutions Over Texas =

2024 book by William J. Chriss

Six Constitutions Over Texas: Texas' Political Identity, 1830–1900
- Cover
- Author: William J. Chriss
- Language: English
- Subjects: Constitutional history of Texas, Texas history, Texas politics
- Publisher: Texas A&M University Press
- Publication date: February 14, 2024
- Publication place: United States
- Pages: 336
- ISBN: 978-1-64843-171-5 (cloth)
- OCLC: 1409498553

Six Constitutions Over Texas: Texas' Political Identity, 1830–1900 is a 2024 book by American attorney and historian William J. Chriss, published by Texas A&M University Press. The book traces the drafting and adoption of the six Texas constitutions between 1836 and 1876, arguing that each document reflected shifting contests over slavery, economic development, racial hierarchy, and the boundaries of political membership. Chriss employs constitutional theory, comparative history, and close reading of convention debates, personal writings of their participants, newspaper accounts, and other primary sources to show the compromise or resolution of contemporaneous political disputes, including how Texas political leaders used constitutional law to allocate power and resources and define and redefine who counted as a citizen. American historian H. W. Brands wrote the foreword to the book.

== Background ==
Chriss is an attorney, historian, and political scientist based in Corpus Christi, Texas, who has taught American history, Texas history, constitutional law, and political theory at Texas A&M University–Corpus Christi. He holds a J.D. from Harvard Law School and a Ph.D. in history from the University of Texas at Austin, where he studied under the historian H. W. Brands, who also wrote the foreword to Six Constitutions Over Texas. He holds additional postgraduate degrees in theology, political science, and English literature. At age twenty, Chriss was nominated for the Rhodes Scholarship by the University of Texas, and he graduated from Harvard Law School at age twenty-three. He is also the author of The Noble Lawyer (2011). In an interview on the State Bar of Texas Podcast marking the sesquicentennial of the 1876 Texas Constitution, Chriss explained that the book's title was suggested by Brands, who considered it a concise way of framing the state's constitutional history; Chriss said that the number of constitutions could be counted as higher than six depending on whether one includes the 1827 Constitution of Coahuila y Tejas or treats the 1891 amendments to the 1876 Texas Constitution as a distinct governing document. He described the book as a study of how rapid political change (six constitutions adopted within roughly forty years) reflected tensions between agrarian populism, post–Civil War economic development, and efforts to dismantle Reconstruction-era governance, forces that collectively shaped the character of the current Texas Constitution and resulted in an enduring Texan political ideology.

== Summary ==
Six constitutions were adopted in Texas between 1836 and 1876. Chriss treats each as a product of ideological conflict rather than mere legal revision. His thesis is that constitutions are not simply governing documents but artifacts of political identity, and that in Texas this identity was shaped initially by the desire of Anglo settlers to acquire, develop, and increase the value of land. Doing so involved Anglo colonists protecting liberal Mexican immigration policies and the institution of slavery, as well as excluding or subordinating Native Americans and African Americans. As Texas moved from colony to republic to American state, Texas leaders made new political arrangements to deal with new challenges. Using the concept of alterite (the construction of collective identity through the definition of outsiders) and Benedict Anderson's theory of imagined communities, Chriss reads each constitutional moment as a negotiation among competing visions of the Texas polity, and who belonged to it and on what terms. Chriss asks how does republicanism coexist with an exclusivist political or cultural identity?

Chriss begins with the 1827 Coahuila y Texas Constitution and the circumstances surrounding the 1836 Constitution of the Republic of Texas, drafted at Washington-on-the-Brazos even as the Alamo was under siege. He argues that the revolution was driven both by the desire for liberty from the tyranny of Mexican Generalissimo Antonio López de Santa Anna, as Texas mythology holds, and by the Anglo colonists' determination to secure and develop land via immigration and slavery, both of which were threatened by Mexican authority. The 1836 Constitution prohibited the Texas Congress from emancipating slaves, barred free Black people from residing in the Republic without legislative consent, and denied citizenship to Africans and their descendants. At the same time, it extended citizenship to Mexicans who had not opposed the revolution, reflecting a pragmatic approach to inclusion. Chriss discusses figures familiar to any schooled Texan, such as Stephen F. Austin and Sam Houston, but also to less well-known actors like Oran Milo Roberts, whom Chriss describes as "Texas' paradigmatic nineteenth-century prosecutor, politician, judge, orator, rebel, senator, 'redeemer,' governor, chief justice, university founder, and finally its historian."

The 1845 Constitution, adopted when Texas entered the United States, carried the same racial order into statehood. Annexation was itself an expression of Manifest Destiny, and the new constitution enshrined slavery while adapting the Republic's governing framework to the requirements of the federal system. Chriss details how the convention delegates, many of them the same men who had drafted the 1836 document, took as their primary models the constitutions of Louisiana and other slaveholding states.

The third chapter covers secession and the 1861 Constitution. Chriss traces the maneuvering that led Texas into the Confederacy despite Governor Sam Houston, who refused the Confederate loyalty oath and was, as a result, removed from office. The 1861 Constitution largely swapped references to the United States for the Confederate States but added explicit slavery protections, including a ban on legislative emancipation. Chriss argues the Texas secession convention stood out for the vehemence of its racial rhetoric, particularly in Oran M. Roberts's "Declaration of Causes." The 1866 Constitution, produced under Andrew Johnson's lenient Reconstruction policies, reflected the white establishment's effort to concede as little as possible — formally abolishing slavery and repudiating secession while refusing Black Texans the vote or officeholding and imposing the Black Codes. Chriss presents it as evidence that military defeat had not altered the ruling class's rejection of racial equality.

The 1869 Constitution, drafted under Congressional Reconstruction with significant Republican and African American participation, was the most progressive of the six. It established a more centralized public school system, granted Black men the vote, and expanded gubernatorial powers. Yet it remained fragile, dependent on federal military enforcement and Unionist Republican governor Edmund J. Davis, whom Democrats regarded as a tyrant.

The 1876 Constitution, still in effect with amendments, emerged from the "Redeemer" movement. Drafted by ex-Confederates and members of the Grange, it curtailed the powers of governor, legislature, and judiciary. Chriss argues it was not merely a reaction against Reconstruction but a new synthesis: limited government serving landowners and the emerging white business and middle classes while maintaining racial hierarchy through segregation and the exclusion or subordination of Black and Hispanic Texans.

Under Chief Justices Stayton and Gaines, in the 1880s and 1890s, the Texas Supreme Court adapted common law to industrialization, urbanization, and populist agitation. Chriss argues the 1891 amendments creating the Courts of Civil Appeals amounted to a seventh constitutional regime — mollifying populist demands through incremental consumer and worker protection and limited regulation while preserving the conservative order. "In Texas, populism died not with a bang but with a whimper," Chriss writes. "It was marginalized by coopting its least controversial elements into a new ideological synthesis: business progressivism."

There is an appendix on comparative constitutionalism, citing Ackerman's "constitutional moments," Gary J. Jacobsohn's "constitutional identity," and the revisionist Texas historiography of Buenger, Calvert, and De Leon. Part of the work is, as Chriss puts it, "a meta-history, the history of how a history (or a mythology) came about, and how it came to be so resilient." Borrowing Hegel's dialectic, he reads the contradictions running through Texas's constitutions (republicanism against slavery, populism against capitalism, racial exclusion against democratic aspiration) as producing successive syntheses that defined the state's political identity at each stage.

== Critics ==
Matthew K. Hamilton called the book a "welcome addition to Texas historiography." Hamilton found it aligned with the emerging revisionist scholarship of Walter Buenger and Sam W. Haynes, which has pressed new interpretations of what has conventionally been "a tradition-laden subject." However, he noticed that the Prologue's portray of Spanish Texas and the La Junta region amounted to "an unnerving anomaly" that worked "better as a reference work than as a narrative."

Matthew Kolodoski described it as "the definitive look at six constitutions over Texas between 1830 and 1900." Kolodoski noticed that the thesis throughout the book (how republicanism coexists with an exclusivist political identity) carried not only retrospective but also "a prospective component concerning our current political environment."
