= Xavier Marquis =

American rapper

Ex Marquis
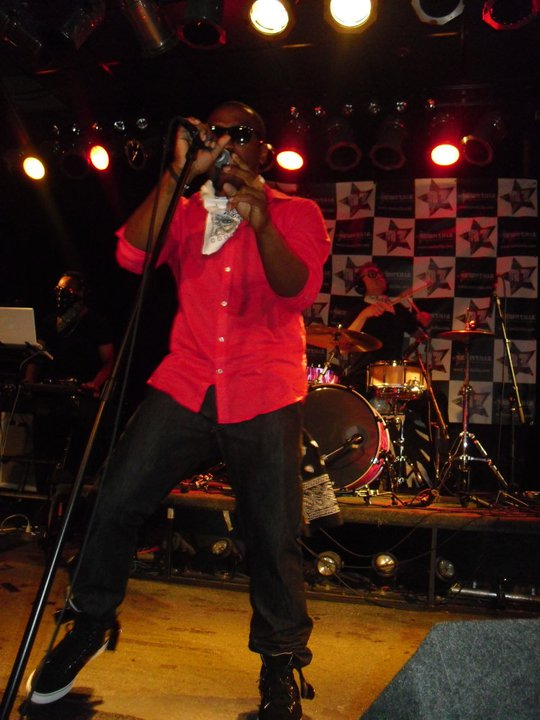
- Xavier Marquis at Rawkzilla Battle of the Bands 2011

Background information
- Also known as: Xavier Marquis, XM, X. Marquis
- Born: Xavier Marquis Davis; March 13, 1984 (age 42); Minneapolis, Minnesota, US
- Genres: Hip hop
- Occupations: Rapper, Singer, Songwriter, Record producer
- Instruments: Roland Fantom-X Synthesizer/Workstation, Apple Logic Pro, Native Instruments Komplete
- Years active: 2009–present

Xavier Marquis Davis (born March 13, 1984), better known by his stage name Ex Marquis is an American rapper, singer, songwriter, and record producer from Minneapolis, Minnesota.

== Career ==
=== Early years ===
Marquis began writing songs at nine years old. He came from a family of musicians and singers. At age 16, he purchased his first keyboard which helped him hone his productions skills and prepare him for his opportunity to study music and produce records at FlyteTyme Studio, the studio belonging to Jimmy Jam and Terry Lewis. "The time I spent at Flyte Tyme was essential to my growth as a music producer and artist. There was so much history there. Just to know that you were recording in the same place that Michael and Janet Jackson, Mariah Carey, Boys II Men, and Usher once recorded in is breathtaking and motivating."

=== 2008-2010: The X-Files Mixtape: Episode 1 ===
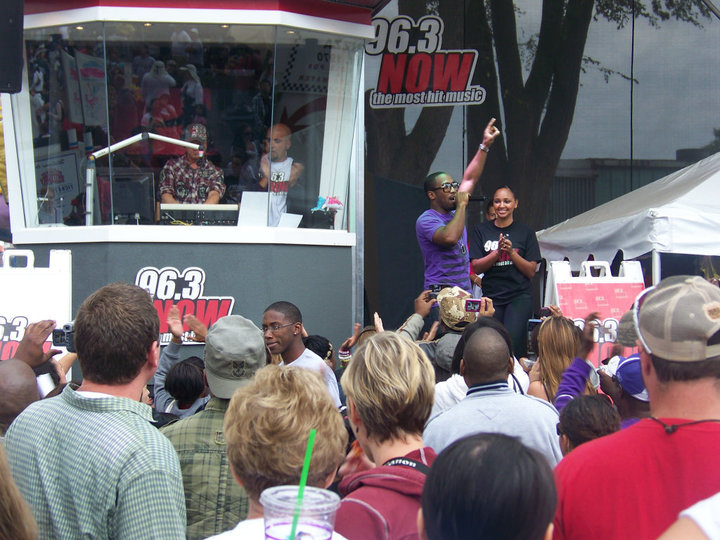
Xavier Marquis at the Minnesota State Fair 2010

In 2008, Marquis began recording his first mixtape "The X-Files Mixtape: Episode 1. He wanted to bring something different to hip-hop, stating, "I like to give listeners' ears a full course meal. A lot of artists are either afraid or unable to step out of the box. People get tired of the same ole' thing all the time, so I attempt to give them a little bit of everything to fill not only their appetites, but mine as well." In the middle of recording the mixtape in St. Paul, Minnesota, he decided to move his operation to Dallas, Texas. Shortly after his move he met rapper AnonymousCulture and immediately began producing tracks for the emcee. One of the many tracks he produced for AnonymousCulture was "PosterBoi. Through AnonymousCulture, he met producer and rapper LehtMoJoe. He later collaborated with the producer on the song "Touch the Sky". Marquis later remixed LehtMoJoe's "Look Around". The X-Files Mixtape: Episode 1 was released April 2010.

In November 2010, Marquis released the single "Open Letter". The single was later awarded the "Urban Finals Grand Prize" by MTV partner company Ourstage.com. He finished once in the Top 10 and twice in the Top 40 of ourstage.com's monthly song competition.

=== 2011-Present: The X-Files Mixtape: Episode 2 ===
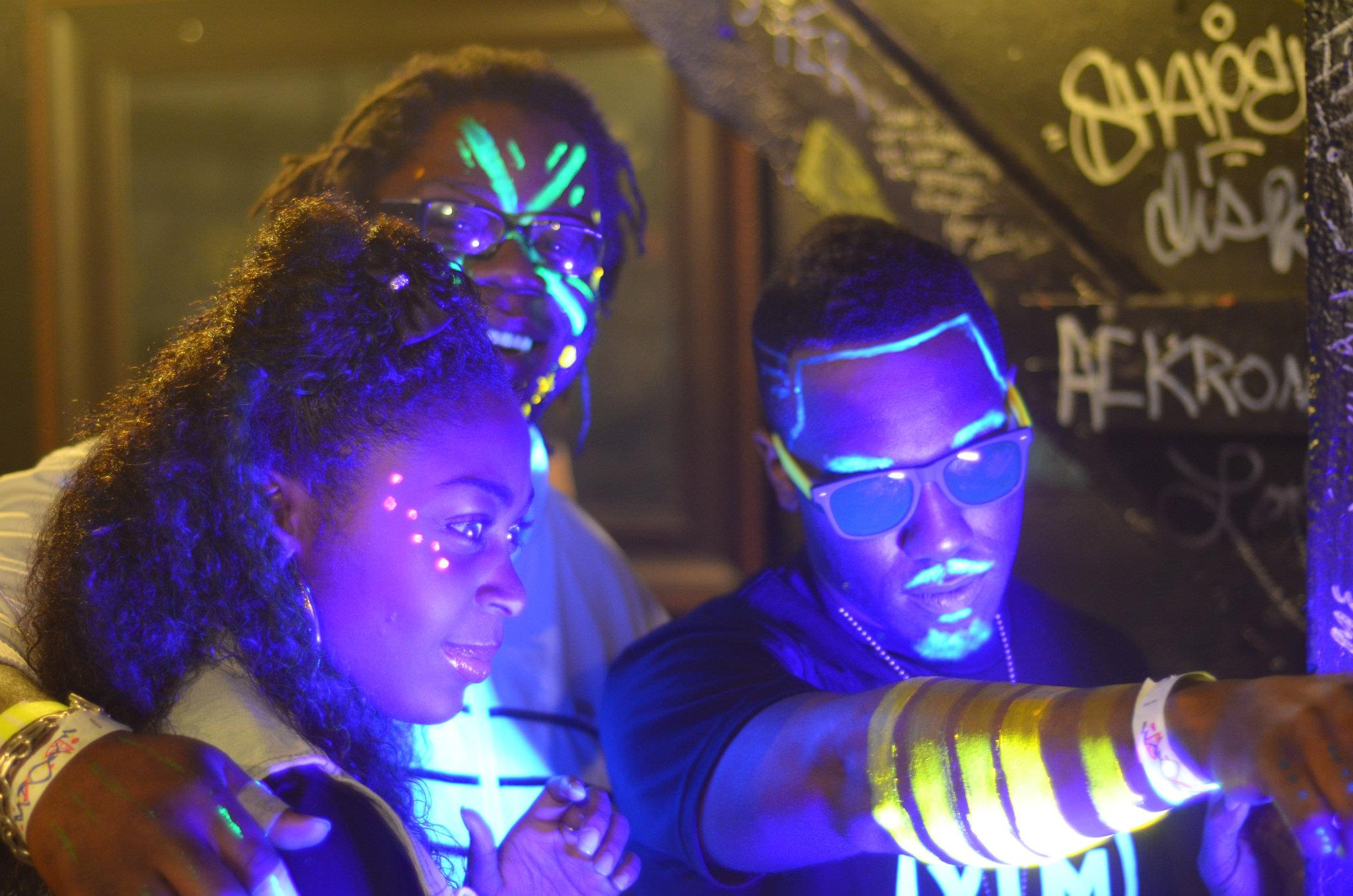
XM, Gabrielle Samone, Marcus Kar

After moving back to his hometown, Minneapolis, he assembled a band for his live performances and completed "The X-Files Mixtape: Episode 2". On July 28, 2011, Marquis headlined "The X-Files Mixtape: Episode 2 Release Show." Accompanied by his backing band, Marquis performed to a near-capacity crowd at the historic First Avenue in Minneapolis, MN. In September 2011, it was announced that Marquis and his band made it to the Rawkzilla Battle of the Bands Finals. Rawkzilla is the largest battle of the bands in the Midwest. Marquis and his band came in second place out of 86 bands.

In November 2011, he was awarded his second "Urban Finals Grand Prize" by MTV partner company Ourstage.com for his song "Lovelee Day" featuring singer/songwriter Gabrielle Samone.

Marquis released his single "Soul Glo" January 1, 2012. The single showed his boastful side with lyrics like "Too big for these rappers coming from the Sota, give up, let go, stop that, it's over."

In February 2012, it was announced that Marquis was selected as one of three finalist out of 236 entries in the annual "Are You Local?" best new band contest held by Vita.mn. He was featured on the cover of the Vita.mn magazine. In the interview conducted for the magazine Marquis stated, "I've always aspired to be someone that reaches the masses, I wanna fly all over the world and have stadiums full of people that love the music I make." The Are You Local? showcase and SXSW Send Off show was held at First Avenue in Minneapolis, MN, on March 2, 2012. Xavier and his band performed wearing Xavier's XM logo shirts and neon paint under black lights. "Rapper Xavier Marquis' set was arguably even wilder. His various backup/hype vocalists jumped around Marquis in their neon face paint, and his surprisingly metallic band pounded away, coolly mashing up Silversun Pickups' "Lazy Eye" in the set highlight "Maybe Something.""

In December 2012, Marquis released his single "Show Girl". Shortly after the single release, XM released his first official music video. The "Show Girl" music video was directed by director Adam J. Dunn. The video told a dark tale about a murderous groupie.

== Discography ==
=== Mixtapes ===
- The X-Files Mixtape: Episode 1 (2010)
- The X-Files Mixtape: Episode 2 (2011)

=== Singles ===
- "Dangerous" (2009)
- "Hate Me" (December 2009)
- "Paradise" (January 2010)
- "You Killin' Me" (July 2010)
- "Crazy Love featuring Sedrick Stylez" (August 2010)
- "Open Letter" (November 2010)
- "Lovelee Day" featuring Gabrielle Samone (May 2011)
- "Don't Want Know" featuring Munqs (June 2011)
- "Soul Glo" (January 2012)
- "Show Girl" (December 2012)

== Videography ==
- "S.O.S. (Spot Me)" (2010) Directed by Corey Lawson
- "Show Girl" (2012) Directed by Adam J. Dunn

== Past live performance band members ==
- Dave Sellner (Drums)
- Josh Ackerley (Bass/Vocals)
- Bob "Zen" Firestone (Electric Guitar)
- Shaquille Lapree (Vocals)
- Marcus Kar (Djembe)
- Corey Lawson aka Munqs (Keyboards/Vocals)
