= Shirkey =

Shirkey is an Anglicised Irish surname. Notable people with the surname include:

- George Shirkey (1936–2022), American football player
- Mike Shirkey (born 1954), American politician
