= Endeley =

Endeley is a surname. Notable people with the surname include:

- E. M. L. Endeley (1916–1988), Cameroonian politician
- Herbert Endeley (born 2001), American soccer player
- Jimmy Endeley (born 1971), Swedish actor

== See also ==
- Endsley
