= Fort Stockton Independent School District =

School district in Texas

Address
- 101 West Division Street Fort Stockton, Texas, 79735 [[United States]]

District information
- Type: Public
- Grades: PreK–12
- NCES District ID: 4820190

Students and staff
- Students: 2,310 (2020–2021)
- Teachers: 182.64 (on an FTE basis)
- Staff: 196.62 (on an FTE basis)
- Student–teacher ratio: 12.65:1

Other information
- Website: www.fsisd.net

Fort Stockton Independent School District is a public school district based in Fort Stockton, Texas, United States. The superintendent of schools is Dr. Gabriel Zamora.

== History ==
The Fort Stockton Independent School District was created in 1917 by the Texas Legislature by HB 59, Special Sessions Acts of 1917, and was organized on October 12, 1917.

The construction of the former Fort Stockton High School, on Oklahoma Street, which initiated the legislation, was completed and the school was initiated in February 1917 with C. V. Compton as superintendent.

=== Superintendents ===
Superintendents of schools in the Fort Stockton Independent School District have been:

- C. V. Compton (1917–1922)
- J. W. Head (1922–1925)
- G. W. Page (1926–1927)
- H. H. Crain (1927–1929)
- V. A. Byrd (1929–1931)
- J. F. Reeves (1931–1942)
- M. E. Fincher (1942–1947)
- E. W. (Ike) Smith (1947–1953)
- James G. Huckaby (1953–1974)
- Otto W. Langlois (1974–1976)
- Jon Miller Ryan (1976–?)
- Ralph Traynham (2009–2021)
- Gabriel Zamora (2021–present)

== Academics ==
In 2009, the school district was rated "academically acceptable" by the Texas Education Agency.

== Schools ==
- Fort Stockton High School (grades 9–12)
- Fort Stockton Middle School (grades 6–8)
- Fort Stockton Intermediate (grades 4–5)
- Alamo Elementary (grades PPCD, PCD, kindergarten—grade 3)
- Apache Elementary (prekindergarten—grade 3)
