= George Shirkey =

American football player (1936–2022)

No. 74, 77
- Position: Defensive tackle

Personal information
- Born: August 20, 1936; Fort Stockton, Texas, U.S.
- Died: February 18, 2022 (aged 85)
- Listed height: 6 ft 4 in (1.93 m)
- Listed weight: 260 lb (118 kg)

Career information
- High school: Fort Stockton
- College: San Angelo (1955–1956); Stephen F. Austin State (1957–1958)
- NFL draft: 1958: 16th round, 191st overall pick

Career history
- Houston Oilers (1960–1961); Oakland Raiders (1962); Buffalo Bills (1963)*
- * Offseason or practice squad member only

Awards and highlights
- 2× AFL champion (1960, 1961)

Career AFL statistics
- Sacks: 4.5
- Stats at Pro Football Reference

George Rogers Shirkey (August 20, 1936 – February 18, 2022) was an American professional football defensive tackle who played three seasons in the American Football League (AFL) with the Houston Oilers and Oakland Raiders. He played college football at San Angelo College and Stephen F. Austin State University.

== Early life ==
George Rogers Shirkey was born on August 20, 1936, in Fort Stockton, Texas. He attended Fort Stockton High School in Fort Stockton. He lettered three years in football, two years in basketball, and two years in track.

== College career ==
Shirkey was a member of the San Angelo Rams of San Angelo College from 1954 to 1956. He suffered several injuries dueing his time at San Angelo. He was then a two-year letterman for the Stephen F. Austin Lumberjacks of Stephen F. Austin State University from 1957 to 1958.

== Professional career ==
Shirkey was selected by the San Francisco 49ers in the 16th round, with the 191st overall pick, of the 1958 NFL draft. He signed with the Houston Oilers of the American Football League (AFL) in 1960. He played in all 14 games, starting five, for the Oilers during the team's inaugural season in 1960, recording one sack. Shirkey also started for the Oilers in the 1960 AFL Championship Game, a 24–16 victory over the Los Angeles Chargers. He appeared in seven games, starting six, during the 1961 season, posting 1.5 sacks. He started in the AFL Championship game for the second year in a row, a 10–3 victory over the San Diego Chargers.

In August 1982, Shirkey was selected by the Oakland Raiders in the "equalization draft". He played in all 14 games, starting ten, for the Raiders in 1962, recording two sacks.

On June 19, 1963, Shirkey, Hank Rivera, and Pete Nicklas were traded to the Buffalo Bills for Archie Matsos. However, Shirkey never reported to the team and was released.

== Personal life ==
Shirkey died on February 18, 2022.
