= Endsley =

Endsley is a surname. Notable people with the surname include:

- Jane Johnson Endsley (1848–1933), American businesswoman from TExas
- Melvin Endsley (1934–2004), American musician
- Mica Endsley, American Chief Scientist of the United States Air Force
- Mike Endsley (born 1962), American politician
- Shane Endsley, American musician

== See also ==
- Endsleigh (disambiguation)
