= Endsleigh =

Endsleigh may refer to:

- Endsleigh Cottage, former country house of the Dukes of Bedford in Devon, England
- Endsleigh Insurance, British insurance intermediary
- Endsleigh League, or English Football League, sponsorship name of the EFL 1993–1996

== See also ==
- Endsley, a surname
