= William J. Chriss =

American lawyer, legal historian, and author

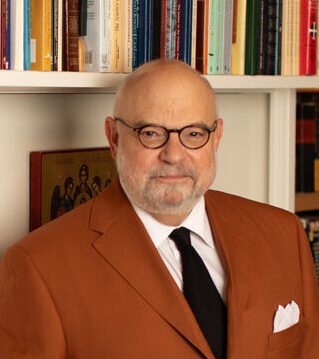
- Chriss in 2024
- Citizenship: American
- Known for: The Noble Lawyer (2011); Six Constitutions Over Texas (2024)
- Awards: Dan Rugeley Price Memorial Award (2005); Chief Justice Jack Pope Professionalism Award (2016)

Academic background
- Education: Harvard Law School (J.D.); University of Texas at Austin (Ph.D.)
- Thesis: Six Constitutions Over Texas: Law in Creating Modern Texan Political Identity, 1835–1900 (2014)
- Doctoral advisor: H. W. Brands

Academic work
- Discipline: History, Politics, Philosophy, and Religion
- Sub-discipline: American history, Texas history, Legal history, constitutional law, Eastern Christianity, ancient history, Legal ethics
- Institutions: Texas A&M University–Corpus Christi; Texas Center for Legal Ethics; Snapka Law Firm

William John Chriss is an American lawyer, historian, author, and political commentator based in Corpus Christi, Texas. He holds a J.D. from Harvard Law School and a Ph.D. in history from the University of Texas at Austin and is the author of The Noble Lawyer (2011) and Six Constitutions Over Texas (2024). He has served as chair of the Appellate Section and Insurance Law Section of the State Bar of Texas and is an elected member of the American Law Institute.

== Early life and education ==
Chriss is a third-generation resident of Corpus Christi, Texas. While attending the University of Texas at Austin as an undergraduate he was nominated for the Rhodes Scholarship at the age of twenty. He received his Juris Doctor from Harvard Law School at the age of twenty-three, where he was awarded a Mark De Wolfe Howe Fellowship in English and American legal history and civil liberties.

Chriss earned three master's degrees (in political science, Christian theology, and English literature) from various universities, and then a Ph.D. in history from the University of Texas at Austin, where he held the Dickson-Allen-Anderson endowed doctoral fellowship. His 2014 doctoral dissertation, Six Constitutions Over Texas: Law in Creating Modern Texan Political Identity, 1835–1900, provided the basis for his later book of substantially the same title.

== Career ==
=== Law practice ===
Chriss is a trial and appellate lawyer in Texas. As of 2026, he has been board certified in Civil Trial Law and in Personal Injury Trial Law by the Texas Board of Legal Specialization for more than thirty years. He is one of a small number of Texas lawyers to have been elected to membership in the American Law Institute, the body that publishes the Restatements of the Law. At the time he received the 2016 Pope Award he practiced as Of Counsel at Gravely & Pearson, L.L.P. in the firm's Corpus Christi office. As of 2026, he is Of Counsel at the Snapka Law Firm.

Within the State Bar of Texas, Chriss has served as the 2024–25 chair of the Appellate Section and is a former chair of the Insurance Law Section. He has also chaired the Texas Pattern Jury Charge Committee for Business, Consumer, Insurance and Employment matters and served as editor-in-chief of The Journal of Texas Insurance Law.

=== Texas Center for Legal Ethics ===
Chriss is a former executive director of the Texas Center for Legal Ethics. The center has continued to list him among its faculty and has a continuing legal education course titled "The Noble Lawyer," based on his 2011 book.

=== Teaching ===
Chriss has taught judicial politics, political and moral philosophy, history, and constitutional law at Texas A&M University–Corpus Christi. He has served as the legal and political commentator for KIII-TV, the ABC affiliate in Corpus Christi.

== Work ==
=== The Noble Lawyer (2011) ===
In The Noble Lawyer, Chriss investigates public hostility toward the legal profession in the United States, attributing part of that hostility to the rise of lawyer advertising and to publicized personal-injury verdicts but primarily to advertising and political action by organized business interests. As a response to such hostility and as exemplars of professional integrity Chriss points to figures including Cicero, Bartolomé de las Casas, Abraham Lincoln, and the fictional Atticus Finch of Harper Lee's To Kill a Mockingbird.

=== Six Constitutions Over Texas (2024) ===
In his 2024 book, Six Constitutions Over Texas: Texas' Political Identity, 1830–1900, Chriss studies each of the six state constitutions adopted in Texas between 1836 and 1876. He documents the territory's transitions through statuses as a Mexican state, an independent republic, a state of the Union, a Confederate state, a state under Reconstruction, and a state intent upon undoing Reconstruction. In his review of the work, Matthew K. Hamilton wrote that it is "not a polemic, it is a history" and called it "a welcome addition to Texas historiography that furthers appreciation of Texas's governing documents and expands academic understanding of the motives, identities (real and imagined), and experiences of the Texans that crafted them."

=== Other writings ===
Chriss's master's theses in Political Science, Christian Theology, and English Literature dealt with the right to privacy, Eastern church history and canon law, and the writings of Joseph Campbell and Ernest Hemingway.

== Awards and honors ==
- Mark De Wolfe Howe Fellowship in English and American Legal History and Civil Liberties, Harvard Law School.
- Dickson-Allen-Anderson endowed doctoral fellowship, University of Texas at Austin.
- Dan Rugeley Price Memorial Award, Texas Bar Foundation, 2005.
- Chief Justice Jack Pope Professionalism Award, Texas Center for Legal Ethics, presented by Chief Justice Nathan Hecht of the Supreme Court of Texas at the Texas Supreme Court Historical Society Annual Dinner, Austin, 9 September 2016.
- Elected member, American Law Institute.

== Selected publications ==
- Chriss, William J. (2011). The Noble Lawyer. Texas Bar Books. ISBN 978-1-892542-66-3.
- Chriss, William J. (2024). Six Constitutions Over Texas: Texas' Political Identity, 1830–1900. Texas A&M University Press. ISBN 978-1-64843-171-5.
- Chriss, William J. and Kathryn Snapka (2019). Periodic Payment of Future Damages in Medical Malpractice Cases, 51 Tex. Tech L. Rev. 847.
- Chriss, William J., Brendan K. McBride, and Marc Gravely (2019). “Insurance Appraisal in Texas and its Place in Coverage Litigation,” St. Mary's Law Journal 50, no. 1 (Spring 2019) 101–148.
- Chriss, William J. (2014). “Chief Justice Jack Pope of Texas: Common Law Judge,” (book chapter) Common Law Judge: Selected Writings of Chief Justice Jack Pope of Texas (Austin, Texas Supreme Court Hist. Society) 322–354.
- Chriss, William J. (2013). “The External Aspect of Legal Ethics, Hot Coffee, and the Noble Lawyer: Attacks on the Profession and Their Massive Ethical and Social Damage,” Trinity Law Review 19, no. 1 (Fall 2013) 13–58.
- Chriss, William J. (2007). “Personhood and the Right to Privacy in Texas,” South Texas Law Review 48, no. 3 (Spring 2007) 575–611.
- Chriss, William J. and John F. Sutton Jr. (2007). “Commentary on the Texas Disciplinary Rules of Professional Conduct Governing the Duties between Lawyer and Client” (with John F. Sutton Jr.), Texas Lawyers’ Professional Ethics, 4th ed. (State Bar of Texas).
- Chriss, William J. (2005). “Coverage for Ensuing Water Damage under Texas Property Insurance Policies,” South Texas Law Review 46, no. 4 (Summer 2005) 1247–1281.
