= Fort Stockton High School (Texas) =

Location
- 1200 W 17th St. Fort Stockton, Texas 79735-7107; United States; 30°54′07″N 102°53′27″W

Information
- Type: Public high school
- School district: Fort Stockton Independent School District
- Principal: Kenneth Vogel
- Teaching staff: 53.73 (FTE)
- Grades: 9–12
- Enrollment: 721 (2023–2024)
- Student to teacher ratio: 13.42
- Colors: Blue; White
- Song: School Song: “Live for Dear Ole Stockton” Live For Dear Ole Stockton Fight Song: Fort Stockton Fight Song Fort Stockton Fight Song
- Athletics conference: UIL Class AAAA
- Mascot: Panthers/Prowlers
- Website: fshs.fsisd.net

Fort Stockton High School is a public high school located in Fort Stockton, Texas, USA, and classified as a 4A school by the University Interscholastic League. It is part of the Fort Stockton Independent School District located in west-central Pecos County. In 2015, the school was rated "Met Standard" by the Texas Education Agency.

== Athletics ==
The Fort Stockton Panthers compete in cross-country, volleyball, football, basketball, powerlifting, swimming, diving, golf, tennis, track, softball, and baseball.

State titles have been won in boys' golf (1977 - 3A), girls' golf (1977 - 3A), and boys' track (1955 - 1A, 1962 - 2A).

== Notable people ==
=== Notable alumni ===
- Rick McIvor – collegiate and professional (NFL) American football player: St. Louis Cardinals (1982–1983)
- Tate Randle – collegiate and NFL player: Houston Oilers, Baltimore / Indianapolis Colts, Miami Dolphins (1982–1987)
- George Shirkey – collegiate and professional NFL player: Houston Oilers and Oakland Raiders (1960–1962)

=== Notable staff ===
- Doug Davalos – former Fort Stockton High School basketball coach (1996–2000), collegiate basketball coach: Texas State University (2006–2013)
