= Pegot Waring =

American sculptor (1909–1983)

Pegot Wolf Waring (1908–1983) was an American sculptor, known especially for her work with direct carving.

Born in Dallas, Waring attended Washington University in St. Louis before marrying an attorney from Chicago; later she traveled to Cranbrook Educational Community to work with Carl Milles. In 1936 she moved to California with her daughter, and in 1939 she showed work at the World's Fair. It was around this time that she became acquainted with Bruno Adriani, who introduced her to the world of pre-Columbian art. In 1945 his book Pegot Waring: Stone Sculptures was published by the Nierendorf Gallery. In 1950 Waring became the first woman to be granted a one-person show at the Pasadena Art Institute; nevertheless, as a carver of animals and other figures she found herself increasingly at odds with Abstract Expressionism later in her career. Waring is represented in the collection of the Los Angeles County Museum of Art as well as in numerous private collections.
