= Political identity =

Type of social identity

Political identity is a form of social identity marking membership of certain groups that share a common struggle for a certain form of power. This can include identification with a political party, nationalism, inter-ethnic relations or more abstract ideological themes.

Political identities develop in individuals and evolve over time. A significant amount of research has focused on parental influence on the political identity of individuals. In addition to the socialisation of politics through the family, the influence on the political identity of personal factors such as genetics or certain personality traits, has also been the subject of much debate.

In the course of their lives and experiences, some individuals take particular political trajectories and sometimes change their political identity. Militancy and radicalisation are two forms and expressions that political identities can take.

Apart from family and personal influences, there are also more general factors that can have an impact on an individual's political identity. Every person is part of a historical context, a culture, a political system and a generation, all of which influence the way people perceive politics.

Political identities underpin a range of behaviours and have many implications, such as collective political mobilisation and voting behaviour.

== Definition of political identity ==
When the influential political psychology book The American Voter was published, political identity, and in particular partisan identity, was described in terms of emotional attachments to certain social groups. Nevertheless, there are many definitions of political identity, from both political science and psychology. The literature does, however, seem to agree on the idea that political identity is a form of social identity marking membership of certain groups sharing a common struggle for a certain form of power.

In political psychology, the development of social identity theories in the 1970s led to a reinterpretation of political identity in terms of attachment to social groups. The emergence of this new theoretical framework has improved the predictive power of individual political behaviour and attitudes.

This theory showed that each person can be linked to many groups at any time. The circumstances of the moment then determine which category the individual chooses to interpret his or her environment. In this context, political identity is one possible form of social identity among others.

== The development of political identity ==
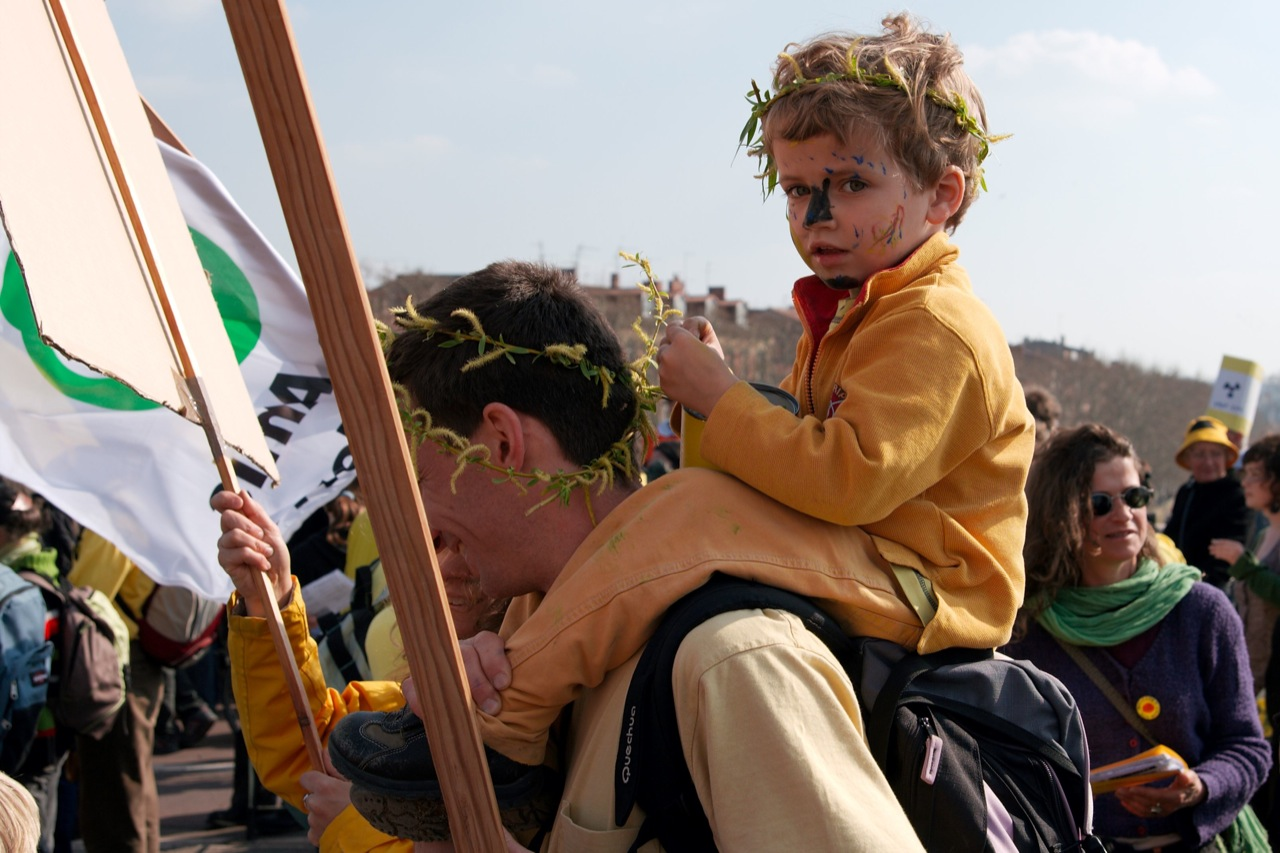
Parents' level of politicization has a significant influence on the transmission of political identity to children

=== Socialisation ===
Given that political attitudes show remarkable stability throughout life, the acquisition of political orientations during the early years of life is of fundamental importance in determining the positions that will be maintained thereafter.

As far as party orientations are concerned, party identification develops in the period leading up to adulthood but is not accompanied by an elaborate ideology. This form of identification is the most powerful factor in predicting voting intentions and positions on more specific political issues. The strength of partisan identification increases with age, as the individual gains experience with the electoral system.

For a long time, parental transmission was seen as a central element in shaping the political identity of their children. It was considered that "a man is born into his political party just as he is born into his future likely membership of his parents' church". However, more recent research indicates that the similarity of parent-child political positions decreases during the early adult years of the offspring, which means that the children's political preferences play a more important role in their partisan identification in early adulthood.

Even so, families differ considerably in their ability to pass on their political views to their children. Variations in relationship patterns do not, however, seem to influence the quality of this transmission. Instead, it seems that the parents who are most successful in passing on their political ideas are those who are the most politicised and have the most stable political positions, as they are the most capable of clearly communicating their political positions.

The transmission of parent-child political identity takes place in the context of a game of reciprocal influences that enables not only parents to influence their children, but also children to influence their parents. In fact, it seems that children are also capable of influencing their parents' political positions on certain occasions, particularly when they introduce more 'modern' attitudes into the family.

The tradition of research into parental transmission of the political identity was initially developed at a time when two-parent families were more common than they are today. It is therefore highly likely that a change in family transmission patterns will emerge in future studies, given that divorced parents present more political disagreements.

=== Individual factors related to political identity ===
The link between personality and political identity is a sensitive subject that can be placed within debates attempting to distinguish between the influence of personality traits and the influence of context on politics, as well as the debate on the personal factors influencing the political arena. Nevertheless, according to some authors, individual personality becomes a particularly important factor in situations where power is concentrated, institutions are in conflict or major changes are taking place.

When it comes to measuring the personality's influence on political identity, two main methods can be adopted: direct assessment via personality questionnaires, or indirect assessments produced by third parties. Nevertheless, in all cases, the variable most studied in this field is authoritarianism, which can be defined as the set of beliefs about power, morality and social order. This variable is measured using Altemeyers' Right Wing Authoritarianism (RWA) Questionnaire.

Some researchers have also attempted to assess the genetic factors influencing political behavior. Following this logic, given that personality traits have a relative influence on political identity, and that genes in turn have an influence on personality traits, genetics should have an indirect impact on political behavior. To determine the nature of this link, studies comparing dizygotic and monozygotic twins indicate that genetics partly determine the intensity of political commitment, but not the direction of political orientation. These results can be explained by the fact that inclination towards group affiliation is itself partly determined by genetic elements.

Nevertheless, the relationship between genetics and political behavior is still far from clear, and heated debates on the subject continue to this day. In any case, future research will have to reconcile the findings of genetic studies with those of studies focusing on social learning.

=== Political action ===
Many authors consider that interest in, and knowledge of, politics is significantly low in society at large. Research has therefore focused on the reasons why some citizens join political groups aimed at influencing the ruling power.

At the root of this thought lies the idea that people who share common interests have a reason to work together to defend and pursue their interests. But many people share interests without actually working together. The first studies then turned to a rational interpretation of political activism, according to which commitment is the result of a comparison between the costs and benefits of the activity.

Apart from those who are paid to be involved in politics or those who are disinterested in it, there are two categories of people who share a common interest in politics. On the one hand, the "active public" include those who voluntarily contribute their time and money to a political organization. On the other hand, "sympathizers" refer to those who support a group's efforts without actually becoming involved. The current literature on activism has thus attempted to study the most important factors in determining the category in which people can be placed. Some of these factors are individual. For example, available resources, level of education or interest in a particular political issue can all be predictors of political involvement.

=== Radicalization ===
Radicalization is the process by which individuals adopt extreme positions on political, social or religious issues.

From a psychosocial perspective, van Stekelenburg and Klandermans see it above all as a process intimately linked to relations between groups, where individuals adopt radical trajectories as a result of interactions between identity dynamics and features of the socio-political context. In other words, according to this perspective, individuals do not radicalize on their own, but rather because they are full-fledged members of a group. Identity issues are therefore central to understanding the "us versus them", "good versus bad" polarization in the relationships among individuals who turn radical. However, according to van Stekelenburg and Klandermans, radicalization cannot be analyzed independently of the socio-political context that feeds or, on the contrary, hinders this process of legitimizing the use of radical actions and demonizing the enemy perceived as the source of problems and discontent. Researchers have identified several contextual levels. Firstly, supranational factors such as technology, information flows and ideologies (e.g. democracy, justice) have a significant influence on radical groups. Van Stekelenburg and Klandermans highlight three main trends in today's world: globalisation, migration and Europeanisation. Secondly, this approach to radicalisation emphasises the impact of the reappropriation of these supranational movements by national politics. A good example is undoubtedly the use of either an assimilationist or a multiculturalist model for managing migratory flows within European countries. The authors also note that the way in which national policies have decided to repress radical movements is a significant factor in the radicalisation process of certain groups. Finally, the last contextual level is linked to the particular situation of the movement and therefore to the social organisation of the movement, the political entrepreneurs of the mobilisation, but also to the potential number of citizens likely to take part in the political action.

Following the same psychosocial perspective, Moghaddam proposes a dynamic model of radicalisation, taking up the same central concepts as van Stekelenburg and Klandermans (politicisation and identity polarisation) and articulating them in a succession of stages through which individuals pass before finally becoming radicalised. These different stages of radicalisation lead people first of all to become politicised to improve their living conditions. Then they polarise the social environment in which they live as a result of dissatisfaction with the situation and the feeling that their demands are not being listened to. Moghaddam also adds that as individuals become more radicalised, their margin of freedom in terms of what they can do becomes narrower.

Other authors have taken an interest in the issue and developed concepts related to the processes of radicalisation. Della Porta has highlighted the notion of "double marginalisation". By detaching themselves from society and the moderate sections of the movement to which they belong, radical groups tend to become isolated. This isolation would gradually lead to a deviation from the "normal" perception of reality and an increase in the propensity to use violent means.

This dynamic view of radicalisation contrasts with a body of literature that has attempted to identify the existence of a "terrorist personality". In this respect, an article by Lichter and Rothman concludes that radicalism is associated with particular family characteristics and a series of psychological traits linked in particular to measures of narcissism, motivations concerning power and lack of affiliation. Other researchers have also sought to link radicalisation with certain psychopathologies such as schizophrenia. This theoretical position is now widely criticised.

In addition to this psychosocial perspective, many authors have looked at the applicability of rational choice theory to the analysis of radicalisation processes. This approach postulates that individuals act by measuring the costs and benefits of their actions to maximise their personal advantage. By way of example, by mobilising this type of argument, Berman provides insights into the destructive and even self-destructive behaviour of the Taliban and other radical religious militias.

=== Change in political identity ===
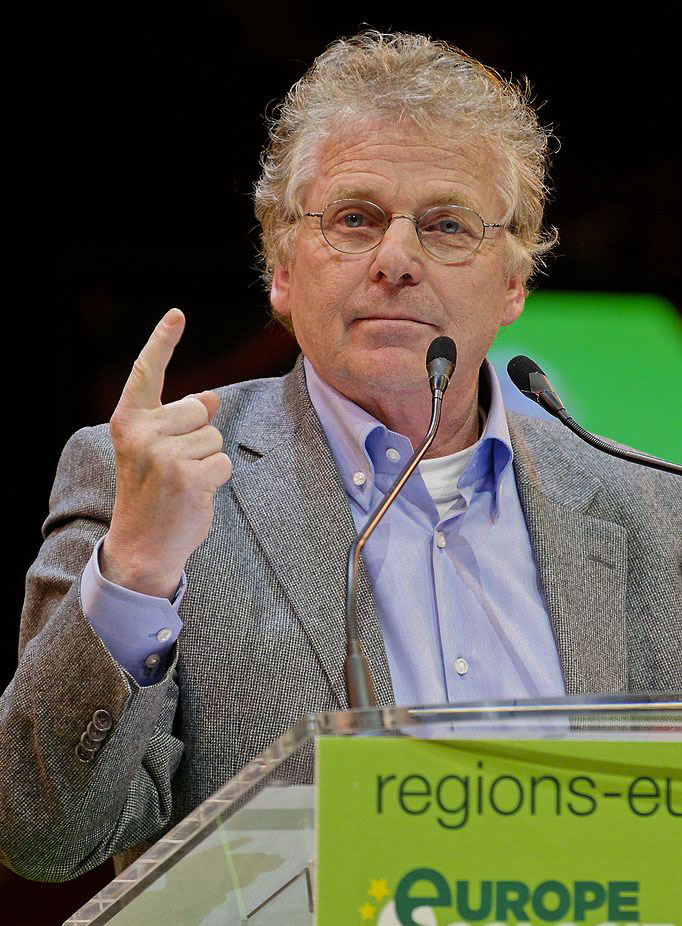
In France, Daniel Cohn-Bendit, who defended anarchist ideas in May 68, gradually became an advocate of a social-liberal economy.

For many people, political identity remains very stable over time, but changes in political positions also occur. This raises the question of which individuals and under what circumstances change.

Researchers have looked at the link between partisan identification and political positions on more specific issues. Originally, the dominant view was that party identification was a very stable element despite contextual events, constituting a filter for the interpretation of political information. According to this point of view, which is still influential today, partisan identification guides political attitudes but is very little influenced by them. In this framework, the only political attitudes likely to exert sufficient pressure to change an individual's partisan orientation are attitudes with significant emotional importance which generate significant variations in party positions.

An alternative interpretation has been developed by the so-called "revisionist" current. In this case, partisan identity is conceived as the result of political evaluations that individuals have formed over time. Advocates of this current clearly support the idea that individuals can change their party of reference in response to their attitudes on specific political issues, particularly when these are salient, emotionally relevant and polarized.

Irrespective of these different theories, it is important to define who would change their political positions and who would change their party identity. In any case, for such changes to take place, parties and candidates must take divergent positions that are known to the public. Those who do not recognize the different positions should then have no incentive to change their positions or their party identity. On the other hand, for those who acknowledge different positions on a political issue, the salience of that position is decisive. If a political position is considered important, it may lead to a change in partisan identity; whereas if a political position is not considered central, it is more likely that the individual will realign his or her positions to be in line with the line defined by the political organization.

== Contextual influences on political identity ==
=== Political generations ===
Studies focusing on the generational aspects of political identity are generally based on the assumption that the most important years for determining political positions are those of adolescence and early adulthood. This postulate suggests that it is precisely during this period that attitudes are at their weakest and most open to change.

In this context, major events can exert strong pressures for change, influencing the young population of a given generation. These "generational units" can then share experiences that will have a long-term effect. For this to happen, generational effects require that the individuals concerned are psychologically open to that period of life, and that there are important political experiences at the corresponding historical moment.

Thus, several political generations have been the subject of particularly intensive empirical studies. In a study published in 1995, Firebauch and Chen examined the electoral behavior of American women from the 1920s onwards. Other studies have focused on the New Deal generation.

More recently, the young activists of the 1960s in Europe and the USA have also been a particularly well-studied political generation. Most evidence suggests that the liberal or left-wing orientation has not only persisted since that time, but has also been passed on to some extent to the descendants of these former young activists.

In an article published in 1998, Stewart, Settles and Winter show that the "committed observers" of that period, i.e. those who were attentive to movements without actually being active in them, developed strong political effects over the long term.

On the other hand, according to some authors, today's younger generations continue, as with those preceding the 1960s, to show low levels of political engagement, interest in political information and participation in elections. While some of these observations can be explained by the fact that young people have historically been less politically active than older adults, some analyses suggest that they reflect a decline in social capital that reduces involvement in collective forms of organization.

=== Historical context ===
Several researchers within the literature attempted to highlight the effect that historical developments can have on the way in which individuals tend to identify themselves politically. There are two traditions of research in this area. Firstly, based on the observation of differences in political identification between certain populations, authors have tried to analyse and understand how history can help to explain such divergences. This is the perspective adopted by Alain Noël and Jean-Philippe Therien. Secondly, another research tradition, particularly prevalent in social psychology, attempts to explain the influence of history through the analysis of collective memories.

==== Historical analysis of differences in political identification ====
To illustrate this approach, Alain Noël and Jean-Philippe Therien's study uses historical arguments to make sense of the differences observed in political analyses. The authors conducted wide-ranging survey across the world in an attempt to analyse the ways in which people identify themselves on the left-right spectrum and the meanings they give to this continuum. They found major differences between certain regions, such as Latin America and the countries of Eastern Europe. Although these two parts of the world are linked to democratic systems and their democratisation processes took place during the same period, (during what Samuel Huntington calls "the third wave of democratisation", which stretches from 1974 to the end of the 1990s), the way in which the left-right spectrum is implanted in public opinion is fundamentally different.

The authors explain these divergences through the political history of these regions. They show that public opinion in South America, with the exception of Uruguay, did not make sense of political identities as being right-wing or left-wing. This can be attributed to social circumstances (increasing poverty, social inequality, etc.) during the democratisation of these countries, which led national political parties not to invest in and institutionalise such ideological divisions. By contrast, the vast majority of countries in the former Soviet Bloc experienced a period of post-communist transition during which ideological polarisation took hold in the political landscape. The period of democratisation generally saw the emergence of an opposition between ex-communists and anti-communists, which led public opinion to internalise political identities along the left-right continuum. These authors therefore emphasise that the left-right spectrum, and hence systems of political perception and identification, are above all social constructions linked to particular historical contexts.

==== Collective memory ====
An entirely different body of research has focused on "collective memory", defined as "a set of shared representations of the past based on a shared identity among the members of a group". "These representations are considered both as activities of social elaboration and communication, as objects produced by this activity, and as symbolic contexts in which this activity takes place – and which it also helps to define". From this perspective, which sees memory as a collective phenomenon, many studies have focused on different social groups. The generations and nations that as a collective and social group engaged in conflictual relations, have received particular attention from the scientific community.

A series of studies have looked at the links that can exist between collective memories and the political behaviour of certain social groups. For example, Schuman and Rieger show that the generations that took part in the Second World War use their experience of this historic event more than other generations to interpret other important political events.

These studies are also consistent with research focusing on the persistent psychological effects of political and social disasters. For example, some studies suggest that the high level of support for the Nazis in the 1930s may have arisen from the severe trauma caused by living conditions at the turn of the century. Events such as the assassination of a popular leader can also have profound effects, both in the short and long term.

=== The political system ===
According to some researchers, an intimate link can be established between the nature and strength of a population's political identities, on the one hand, and the political situation of their region, on the other.

Baker et al. and Kirchheimer have looked at the partisan identification of the Germans in the aftermath of the Second World War, when a new democracy was established. The implementation of this type of political system was, in their view, directly linked to a gradual increase in partisan identification among the population. This same identity movement has also been observed in other studies of the establishment of democracy in other parts of the world, such as Latin America.

Dalton and Weldon are interested in deeper transformations in the nature of political identities linked to variations in political systems. They cite the example of the institutionalization of the Fifth Republic in France. This transition illustrates the shift from a political system centered on a charismatic leader to an organization based on a distribution of power between political parties, thereby shifting the population's attachment to Charles de Gaulle as an individual to Gaullism as a political identity in its own right.

In a large study, Pippa Norris looks at the influence of the electoral system on the way in which political identifications are spread across the population. She shows that political organizations linked to proportional representation tend, in comparison with majoritarian systems, to increase political cleavages and push public opinion towards more assertive positions on the left-right spectrum, at the expense of the centrist positions much more widespread in majoritarian electoral systems.

=== Gender and political identity ===
The literature on gender differences in voting behavior and political identification has developed mainly in the US, with the main consequence that gender differences have been studied almost exclusively in the US context.

Differences in partisan identification between men and women in the United States have historically been highly variable. After a similar rate of Democratic and Republican supporters by gender in the late 1970s, the level of Democratic identification among women increased relative to that of men from the 1980s onwards, until it became significantly different. The gap between men and women does not depend on election cycles, and remains fairly constant during and between election years.

The literature offers several types of arguments as to the reasons for this divergence. Firstly, a significant amount of research has attempted to find causes in the country's political dynamics. For example, some scientists highlighted the impact of the increasing salience and polarization of policies concerning abortion or healthcare reform. However, for a series of researchers, this type of political argument is not enough to explain the gender differences. This is the reason why analyses focusing on socio-economic factors have entered the debate. Chaney, Alvarez and Nagler have developed an argument around the general tendency of women to perceive economic issues more negatively. By turning to the Democratic Party between 1984 and 1992, they argue, women were positioning themselves against the ruling Republican Party on the basis of economic considerations. Box-Steffensmeier, de Boef and Lin conclude their article by saying that the gender gap is caused by a combination of social changes, such as the evolution of family structure or the increase in the percentage of women assuming full household responsibilities, economic opportunities, government priorities and political actors. Similarly, economists Lena Edlund and Rohini Pande explain the shift of women to the left over the last thirty years of the 20th century by the decline of marriage. The authors show that the decline of marriage has resulted in the impoverishment of women and the relative enrichment of men. According to Lena Edlund and Rohini Pande, these changes explain the variations in political orientation according to gender.

However, a number of researchers attempted to study this issue to contexts outside the USA. In an article published in 2000, Inglehart and Norris looked at post-industrial societies and first observed that a gap similar to that in the USA began to develop in the 1990s. Prior to this period, they showed that women in these societies were more conservative than men. Then, in their analysis of the causes of this gender gap, Inglehart and Norris highlighted several significant trends. Firstly, the leftward turn of women in many post-industrial societies is, they argue, rather than a divergence in lifestyle, primarily the product of cultural differences between men and women. In particular, these differences concern post-materialist attitudes and women's collective movements. Secondly, this is more pronounced in younger age groups, whereas in older age groups, women are characterized by greater conservatism. Given this finding, the authors deduced that this gender gap could be a generational factor, and took advantage of the articulation of this hypothesis to invite future research on the issue to look more deeply into this line of thought.

== Implications of political identity ==
=== Voting behaviour ===
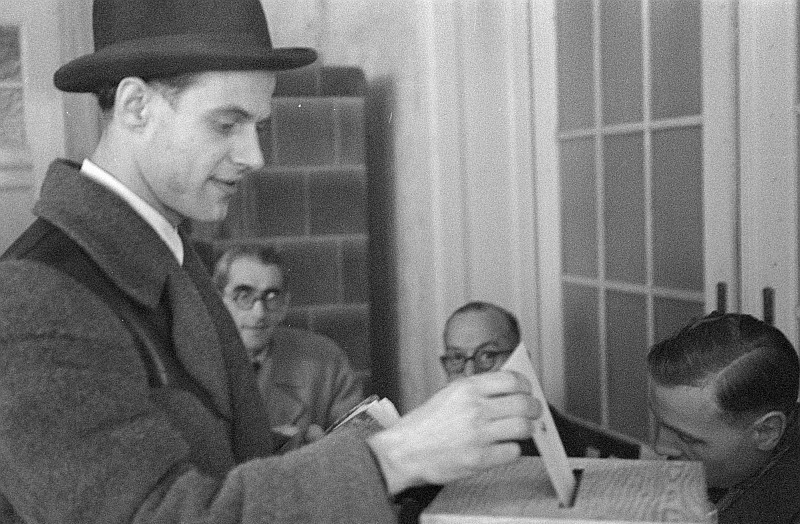
Because of the many issues involved in voting behaviour, voters do not always choose their preferred candidate.

The intuitive prediction about voting would be that voters choose their preferred candidate based on their political identity. However, voting behavior seems to follow more complex rules than that.

First of all, a distinction between evaluation and voting is needed. An evaluation is an assessment of a party or candidate based on a series of dimensions (attractiveness, popularity, radicalism, etc.) according to the information available. Voting, on the other hand, is a decision involving a choice between two or more options. Just as evaluations are the result of information processing influenced by heuristics, decisions can also be influenced by cognitive simplification mechanisms that facilitate the choice by reducing the number of options to be considered. Although evaluations and decisions are necessarily related, they do not always correspond.

In certain situations, voters may choose an alternative that does not necessarily correspond to their own preferences. In such cases, the citizen may vote in a certain way to satisfy those around him or her, to follow the example of a peer group, to follow the indications of political experts; but also, to avoid the election of an unappreciated candidate. In the latter case, the vote is then strategically planned according to two parameters: preference, which depends on the evaluative judgments held with regard to a candidate; and viability, which represents the candidate's chances of winning a majority.

This kind of strategic reasoning must necessarily take place in a context where more than two candidates are vying for power. Faced with a preferred candidate who has little chance of winning an election campaign, the voter may then give his or her vote to another candidate who is less popular but has a better chance of winning a majority of votes than a third, even less popular candidate. The logic behind this reasoning, known as the "strategic vote", would be to avoid "wasting" votes by choosing a candidate with no chance of winning the election.

=== Systemic effects ===
According to researchers such as Converse and Dupeux, political identification, and more specifically the rate of individuals identifying with a political party in a population, can have what they describe as systemic effects. Accordingly, Mainwaring and Zoco showed that a high level of partisan identification within a population would promote the stability of the existing party system. It would also seem that potential support for a demagogue leader is lower when the population identifies with a party already established in the country's political landscape.

== See also ==
- Political sociology
- Political philosophy
- Political science
- Identity
- Social identity theory

== Bibliography ==
- Millar Mackenzie, William James (1978). Political Identity. New York: St. Martin's Press.
- Miller, W.E.; Shanks, J.M (1996). The New American Voter. Cambridge: Harvard University Press.
- Noël, A.; Thérien, J-P (2010). La gauche et la droite, un débat sans frontières (in French). Montréal: PUM.
- Elia Azzi, Assaad; Chryssochoou, Xenia; Klandermans, Bert; Simon, Bernd (2011). Identity and Participation in Culturally Diverse Societies: A Multidisciplinary Perspective. Oxford: Wiley-Blackwell. pp. 178–194.
- Chevallier, Jacques (1994). L'identité politique (in French).
- Labbée, Xavier (1994). Les critères de la norme juridique (in French).
- Denis-Constant, Martin (1992). "Des identités en politique". Revue française de science politique (in French). 42 (4): 582–635.
- Denis-Constant, Martin (1994). Cartes d'identité. Comment dit-on nous en politique? (in French).
- Chanlat, J.F. (1989). "L'analyse sociologique des organisations". Sociologie du Travail (in French) (3). doi:10.3406/sotra.1989.2473.
- Reynaud, J.D. "Les régulations dans les organisations". Revue française de sociologie (in French). 1988 (1): 17.
- Mucchielli (1986). "L'identité". Que Sais-je (in French) (2288).
- Administrative Behavior, 1945. French translation : Administration et processus de décision, Economica 1983, p. 195. 7 J. Chevallier, "L'analyse institutionnelle", in L'institution, P.U.F. 1981, pp. 23 ss.
- Smith, Rogers M. (2004). "Identities, interests and the future of political science". Perspectives on Politics. 2 (02): 301–312. doi:10.1017/S1537592704040174. S2CID 144844167.
- Licata, Laurent; Klein, Olivier; Gely, Raphaël (2007). "Mémoire des conflits, conflits de mémoires: une approche psychosociale et philosophique du rôle de la mémoire collective dans les processus de réconciliation intergroupe". Social Science Information. 46 (4): 563–589. doi:10.1177/0539018407082593. hdl:2013/ULB-DIPOT:oai:dipot.ulb.ac.be:2013/31326. S2CID 144883229.
- Elia Azzi, Assaad (1998). Questions Approfondies de Psychologie Sociale: Les mécanismes psychologiques du nationalisme. Association Minkowski.
