= Terri Hoffman =

Cult leader

- Born: March 21, 1938; Fort Stockton, Texas, United States
- Died: October 31, 2015 (aged 77); Dallas, Texas, United States
- Occupation: Religious leader
- Spouses: John Wilder (m. 1953–1971) Glenn Cooley (m. 1971–1977) Ben Johnson (m. 1977–1980) Don Hoffman (m. 1980–1988) Roger Keanely (m. 2002–2015)
- Children: Cathy (b. 1954); Kenneth (b. 1958–d. 1979); Virginia (b. 1963)

Terri Lee Hoffman (née Benson; March 21, 1938 – October 31, 2015), later known as Terri Lilya Keanely, was an American religious cult leader known for the unexplained deaths of some of her followers, including two husbands, shortly after they had willed their possessions to her. The devotees in her Dallas-based new religious movement, Conscious Development of Body, Mind and Soul, believed that they fought against spiritual entities called "black lords" on various planes of existence and protected themselves with powerful gems. The goal was joining God and the twelve "masters" through reincarnation in the spiritual realm. A four-year investigation by Dallas district attorney's office failed to produce evidence tying Hoffman to the deaths. She was later sentenced to prison for bankruptcy fraud, but was released after the conviction was overturned on appeal.

== Early life and career ==
Hoffman was born on March 21, 1938, into poverty, and sent to a Lutheran orphanage located in Round Rock at age 9. She was adopted two years later and renamed Terri Lee Benson. Hoffman married truck driver John Wilder in 1953 and had her daughter Cathy in 1954, her son Kenneth in 1958 and another daughter, Virginia, in 1963. She was committed to the Parkland Hospital for psychiatric evaluation during divorce proceedings in 1971, but got custody of the oldest child. In the 1950s, Hoffman became interested in meditation, metaphysics, hypnotism, Silva Mind Control and the writings of Edgar Cayce. After attracting a number of followers in the late 1960s, she incorporated her movement as Conscious Development of Body, Mind and Soul in 1974, selling lessons and private "consultations".

Hoffman also started a jewellery business, incorporating it as CD Gems. Followers were instructed to buy expensive, handmade jewellery that she would turn into powerful, protective gems. By the mid-1970s, over a hundred people attended the weekly lectures in Dallas, Texas, and many more took Hoffman's printed lessons. She claimed herself the reincarnation of Saint Teresa of Ávila as her inner circle waged war against the "black lords" on several planes of existence. Aiding them were God and the twelve "masters" such as Jesus who were visible to Hoffman. She also said that she could communicate with the dead and see the past and future. Hoffman eschewed critical thinking, convincing her followers that such "negative energies" could prove fatal. However, death was not to be feared as the ultimate goal was rebirth in the spiritual realm.

== Deaths in the cult ==
25-year-old Glenn Cooley, Hoffman's second husband, decided to leave the cult and his marriage with Terri in late 1976. Five days after the divorce was finalised, Cooley was found dead from a valium and librium overdose on February 1, 1977. Cooley's will, which named Hoffman as the sole beneficiary and was discovered in her safe, was produced by Hoffman. Her group saw the incident as proof that the black lords were seizing control and contaminating the local population. Many members of the movement left as a result of the bloodletting treatment, which supposedly drained the poison from the body. Thirteen years after Cooley's death, a former high-ranking follower claimed to police that Hoffman had told her that he was "moving to the next level" and that the two had visited him at his cabin the night before his passing after he had ingested the drugs. Hoffman married Ben Johnson five months after Cooley died, but they later got a divorce in 1980. At this time, her meditation workshops allegedly drew hundreds of participants, and Conscious Development started to spread into Chicago, Illinois. In August 1979, 21-year-old Kenneth Wilder, the son of Hoffman, died after he fell from a building under construction. His death benefits and other assets were left to his mother.

Hoffman's secretary-treasurer 40-year-old Sandra "Sandy" Cleaver, who joined the spiritual movement in the late 1970s, travelled to Hawaii in February 1979 with her daughter 13-year-old Susan Devereaux Cleaver, who she had previously avoided because Hoffman had claimed that Deveraux was filled with "negative energies" and "evil spirits" that would harm her and infect her energies. As a result, Sandra grew distant from her daughter. On February 25, 1979, Sandra and Deveraux entered an inflatable raft and headed out to sea. According to Sandra, when a first wave knocked their raft over, they were separated by a second wave. Sandra arrived to the coast covered in wounds and bruises caused by coral, but Deveraux's body was discovered hours later. By the time Devereaux's father was notified and flew directly to Hawaii, he found Sandra recovering in a hospital room with Hoffman. Authorities discovered that Susan had made a will just before going on vacation, leaving all of her money and property to Hoffman and the cult. Deveraux owned a basketball, a music collection, and a $125,000 trust fund. On the day of her death, an unidentified woman went to the trust fund's bank and handed over the will. The will was soon sent to her father but it was void because minors were not allowed to write wills in Texas. Because of the "demons" Hoffman said she had inside her, some have hypothesised that Sandy may have killed her daughter.

Cleaver took a $300,000 life insurance policy to the sole benefit of Hoffman and also transferred title of her house to her, paying Hoffman rent to live in her own home. Cleaver tried to cope with her daughter's death, becoming closer to her housekeeper Louise Watson but she continued to follow Hoffman. Although Louise had been hesitant to travel, Sandy and Louise left on September 8, 1981, for Colorado. Sandy then allegedly drove her station wagon directly off a 450-foot cliff after spending the day at Terri's sister's house; the two died instantly. Although investigators determined that Sandy had driven off of the cliff at around 12 p.m., they could never determine why she drove off the cliff. Investigators soon discovered that three months before their deaths, both women had updated their wills naming Hoffman as the sole beneficiary. Cleaver's brother contested the will and his lawyer called it the result of fraud and "undue influence". The case was settled but Hoffman and her movement were faced with bad publicity. Three of the four followers who testified on Hoffman's behalf would later commit suicide. By the mid-1980s, Hoffman had founded the perfume mixing company Perfume Oils International and begun performing acupressure massages.

42-year-old Robin Otstott, a former curriculum writer for the Dallas Independent School District whom Hoffman had matched with an invisible CIA agent named "George", believed that her non-physical "bodies" were working against her and that her best friend Tamara Taylor's invisible CIA lover "Martin" was threatening her life. On April 19, 1987, she told her former husband that she had contracted terminal viral hepatitis from a banana peel but was persuaded to see a doctor. Two days later, after visiting Hoffman, Otstott killed herself with .38-caliber revolver.

On November 30, 1987, 33-year-old follower Mary Alice Levinson was found dead from a drug overdose in a Chicago hotel room. The autopsy discovered a needle puncture mark on her left wrist and it was concluded that she overdosed on two types of prescription sleeping pills. Mary had changed her life insurance policy less than two weeks before her death replacing her youngest brother as beneficiary. The new beneficiary was her former boyfriend whom she had met through Hoffman on a spiritual retreat. She also left behind a taped message for her family that police recovered at the scene stating that she used her divorce settlement money to pay off small debts and make donations to animal welfare charities. However, she refused to name any recipients of these donations. In the tape she spoke of her death; "I want you to understand that I am fully rational and I have come to this decision after a long time of thinking. I am actually looking forward to it... Obviously, with my past work with animals, I believe in euthanasia for those who were suffering horribly."

In 1987, 39-year-old Charles Southern Jr. worked as an English instructor at a Chicago, Illinois, community college. He was a prominent figure in Hoffman's spiritual movement and during his time as a member, Southern's standing position within the organisation rose, and he started running meditation groups and giving classes. Additionally, he frequently visited Hoffman's house in Dallas, Texas. Southern's family learned that he was wandering the streets of Chicago while speaking in tongues and he was then taken to a hospital. His family and two members of the cult paid him daily visits. After being released, Southern went back to his regular schedule, but friends noted that he appeared to have become somewhat disillusioned with Hoffman. He nevertheless continued to be involved in her organisation. During his college's winter break in December 1987, Southern intended to spend two weeks in India. When Southern's stated arrival time at home came and went without a word from him, his family went to check on him. When they searched his home, they found his passport, which was missing any entry stamps from India. In one of Southern's drawers, a vial containing a substance like the poison curare was discovered. His relatives also located two poorly-written notes which appeared to be Southern's wills. Hoffman told Southern's family she was not involved in his disappearance. She was never charged in connection with Southern's case. Southern has never been found.

Hoffman's fourth husband, 50-year-old Richard Donald "Don" Hoffman, who had fallen out of favour in the movement, was discovered dead from a "mixed drug intoxication" on September 16, 1988, after he had checked into the room of the Marriott Hotel in Las Colinas, Texas. His family also later discovered a video of Don in which he said goodbye to his family and revealed that he had terminal, inoperable cancer, which had been proven by three different doctors. His autopsy found no traces of cancer. Hoffman explained to Richard's son that the "black lords" had hidden the evidence of cancer behind an illusion. She was the sole beneficiary of her husband's estate. A wrongful death lawsuit was filed against Terri in March 1989.

Four days after Richard's death, former cult devotee 41-year-old Jill Bounds was found beaten to death in her home. She was a psychologist who had a strong beliefs in the mystical and was deeply involved with Hoffman and her teachings. On September 20, 1988, Jill entered her home at 4:15 p.m. The next day after missing two meetings with friends, the police were called. Authorities believe that whoever murdered Bounds entered through a window; while she had an alarm system her windows were not covered by it. The killer had browsed through her diary and ripped out some of the pages leaving bloody smudges. There was also blood in the bathroom where apparently the assailant had attempted to clean up. Expensive jewellery that she kept hidden in her laundry room, and her gun she kept in her nightstand were missing. However, other expensive pieces were left behind. Bounds had left the movement in 1982 but, despite being afraid of her, visited Hoffman a few months before her death.

In June 1989, long-time followers 48-year-old David Allen Goodman and 47-year-old Glenda Frances Goodman began acting strangely, most likely due to Terri's influence on them. David was a Yale University graduate and university professor at Southern Methodist University, and Glenda was a vice-president for Perfume Oils International, the company started and owned by Hoffman. In their diary, the Goodmans claimed God announced that "the way is clear to get high energies. It's like this: You are about to be joined in a marriage between your phys self & your spirit. All is in readiness. The date is set for Oct 20..." They were found dead in late-November 1990 in their Dallas home, five weeks after dying in a ritualistic double death and ten months since their families last heard from them in January 1990. They had been discovered by a neighbour, both had been shot, and two guns were found at the crime scene. Hoffman claimed she had no contact with them for a few months before their death, however their house was filled with paraphernalia relating to Hoffman's cult, including handwritten notes and letters. Investigators soon discovered that shortly before their deaths, the couple had written checks to Hoffman totalling close to $100,000. Their deaths were ruled a double suicide.

== Investigation and later life ==
Spurred by news reports about the Goodmans and the pattern of deaths that followed Hoffman, a criminal investigation was launched by the Dallas district attorney's office in January 1990. Assistant District Attorney Cecil Emerson stated that it would be difficult to determine if mind control could legally be a contributing factor in a death. Hoffman and Conscious Development denied any wrongdoing. Hoffman's lawyer, Fred Time, referred to the investigation as a witch-hunt and praised his client's persona. After four years, prosecutors could not find evidence linking Hoffman to the deaths.

Hoffman filed for bankruptcy in October 1991, and she was sentenced to 16 months in prison for ten counts of bankruptcy fraud in May 1994. She was released after serving a year after her conviction was overturned on appeal. In 1995, the TV series Unsolved Mysteries featured an episode on the mysterious disappearance of Southern. Hoffman later married Roger Keanely and changed her name to Terri Lilya Keanely. She started a website touting her experience and many talents and wrote a financial advice book. She died on October 31, 2015, at 77.

== Publications ==
- Ryan, Mike; Keanely, Terri Lilya (2006). The Colors of Money: Finding Your MoneyForce. MoneyForce Press. ISBN 978-0978967208.

== Sources ==
- Elkind, Peter (May 1990). "The Curse of the Black Lords". Texas Monthly. Vol. 18, no. 5. Archived from the original on May 23, 2024.
