= Mike Agnew =

American soccer player (born 1965)

Personal information
- Date of birth: November 12, 1965 (age 60)
- Place of birth: Dallas, Texas, United States
- Position: Midfielder

Youth career
- 1984–1987: SMU Mustangs

Senior career*
Years	Team	Apps	(Gls)
1988–1989	Baltimore Blast (indoor)	4	(0)
1989–1992	Richardson Rockets		
- * Club domestic league appearances and goals

Mike Agnew is an American retired soccer midfielder who played professionally in the Major Indoor Soccer League and SISL.

Agnew attended Southern Methodist University where he played on the men's soccer team from 1984 to 1987. He graduated in 1988 with a bachelor's degree in advertising. On June 17, 1988, the Baltimore Blast selected Agnew in the first round (fourth overall) of the Major Indoor Soccer League draft. He played for games for the Blast before being released. He then moved to the Richardson Rockets for the 1988–89 Southwest Indoor Soccer League season. He played at least three seasons for Richardson which became known as the Mid-City Rockets during the 1991–1992 season. Agnew later served as the USISL league director of communications and team services. He lives in Murphy, Texas, where he is director of the Wylie Chamber of Commerce.
