= AnonymousCulture =

American rapper and songwriter

AceCulture
- Also known as: Ace, Culture, Jimmy
- Born: Anttwon Jemon Thames IV; October 20, 1985 (age 40); Dallas, Texas, US
- Genres: Hip hop
- Occupations: Rapper, Songwriter
- Years active: 2009–Present
- Website: www.aceculturemusic.com

Anttwon Jemon Thames IV is an American rapper and songwriter from Dallas, Texas, better known by his stage name AceCulture, formally known as AnonymousCulture.

== Music career ==
AnonymousCulture originally went by the stage name Anonymous????. In 2009, he added Culture to the pseudonym to articulate his strong belief embracing individuality. He described the addition in a 2010 interview, "To be a culture, is just that, man. Be You!...No matter your age or race, I just want them (people) to stand out by being themselves".

In 2009, the newly named AnonymousCulture released a series of mixtapes, The Anonymous Files Volume I and II, and a single, “Stacks,” to bloggers and hip hop fans. In 2010, he released his first original body of work entitled The Intervention. The name came from the idea that music had lost its way and needed a change. "The Intervention" features beats from Dallas producer, LehtMoJoe, Xavier Marquis and King Blue. After the release of “The Intervention”, AnonymousCulture wrote The Truth for Deion Sander's little league football team of the same name. The song aired on the NFL Network as well as the UPN television network. AnonymousCulture was also a featured artist on Chicago’s spin club DJ MetiAlready, "Sho Shot Game/ Cut Throat Edition" signature series Volume 9 in 2010.

In June 2010, AnonymousCulture released the song "Poster Boi" produced by Xavier Marquis from an upcoming mixtape, "Effin Rite" to Dallas Bloggers. He then went on to release the full Alive album, including the "PosterBoi" track in April 2011. He quickly followed that release with the single "La La La" in May 2011 by the Track Boyz. "La La La" has been the breakout single for the artist.

AnonymousCulture is best known for his high energy music videos. His first video, "PosterBoi" came out in January 2011. It went on to be featured on MTV3's 'UnPlugged' in February 2011. His second video, "Last Call" was released in March 2011 and made the Zonisphere iTV Top 10 Countdown within the first two weeks. With the release of his Alive Album in April 2011, he released videos for the "Alive" and "In The Sky" tracks from the album.

Since 2011, AnonymousCulture has performed heavily throughout the West Coast and Midwest, opening for Mystikal, 8Ball & MJG, Z-Ro, Trae tha Truth, Juicy J, Dom Kennedy, Chevy Woods, and many more. The artist has also performed at the Juneteenth Cultural Festival (Dallas), Neon Reverb Festival, NX35 Conferette, North Texas Health Expo and Canadian Music Week Festival. He continues to perform today.

== Discography ==
=== Studio albums ===
The Intervention (2010)

Alive (2011)

I Am A Culture (2015)

The Annexation of Puerto Rico (2017)

King Culture (2021)

=== Mixtapes ===
Idiotic (2012)

Anonymous Files Volume I (2009)

Anonymous Files Volume II (2009)

Hip Hop Legend (2008)

=== Singles ===
"Stacks" (2009)

"PosterBoi" (2010)

"La La La" (2011)

"Too Fast" (2012)

"35" (2020)

== Videography ==
"PosterBoi"

"Last Call"

"In the Sky"

"Alive"

"La La La"

"Too Fast"

"Greedy Bam"

"Baby"

"Go Getta"

"Legend Has Begun"

"1150 Buckner"
