= Fort Stockton, Texas =

- City
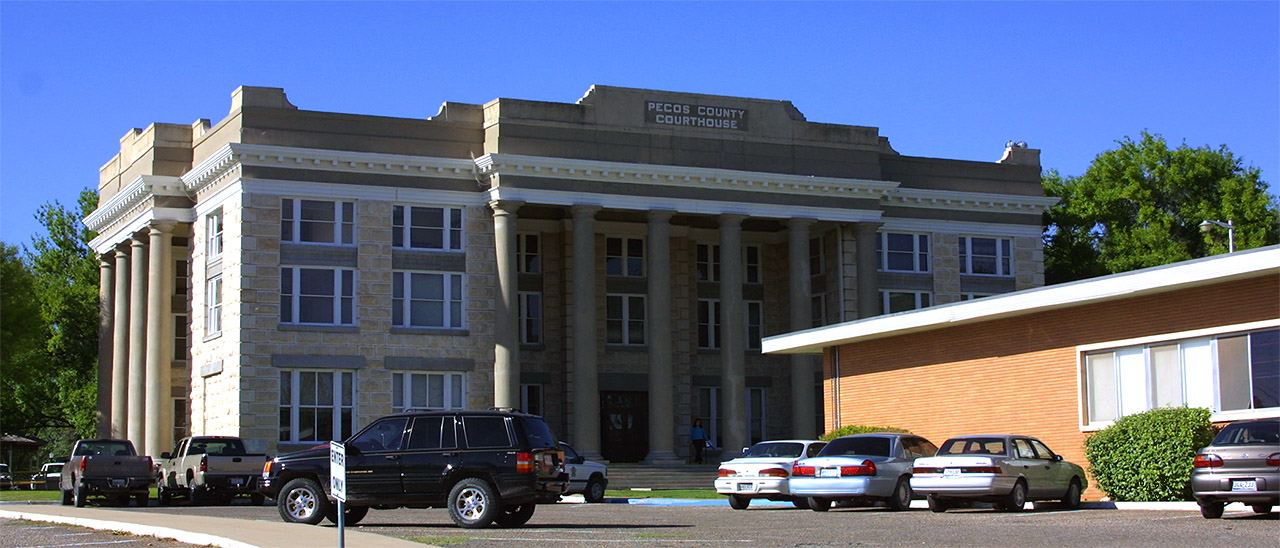
- Pecos county courthouse
- Nicknames: "Stockton; Stakitas"
- Motto: The Heart of Pecos County
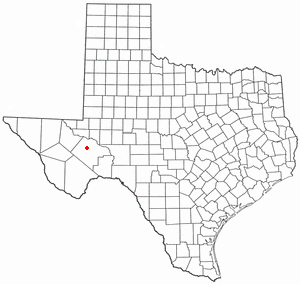
- Location of Fort Stockton, Texas

- Coordinates: 30°53′29″N 102°53′6″W
- Country: United States
- State: Texas
- County: Pecos
- Established: 1859

Government
  - Mayor: Paul Casias

Area
  - Total: 5.55 sq mi (14.37 km^{2})
  - Land: 5.55 sq mi (14.37 km^{2})
  - Water: 0 sq mi (0.00 km^{2})
- Elevation: 2,972 ft (906 m)

Population (2020)
  - Total: 8,466
  - Density: 1,422.3/sq mi (549.14/km^{2})
- Time zone: UTC-6 (Central (CST))
  - Summer (DST): UTC-5 (CDT)
- ZIP code: 79735
- Area code: 432
- FIPS code: 48-26808
- GNIS feature ID: 1357597
- Website: cityoffortstockton.com

Fort Stockton is a city in and the county seat of Pecos County, Texas, United States. It is located on Interstate 10, future Interstate 14, U.S. Highways 67, 285, and 385, and the Santa Fe Railroad, 329 mi (529 km) northwest of San Antonio and 240 mi (390 km) southeast of El Paso. Its population was 8,466 at the 2020 census.

== History ==
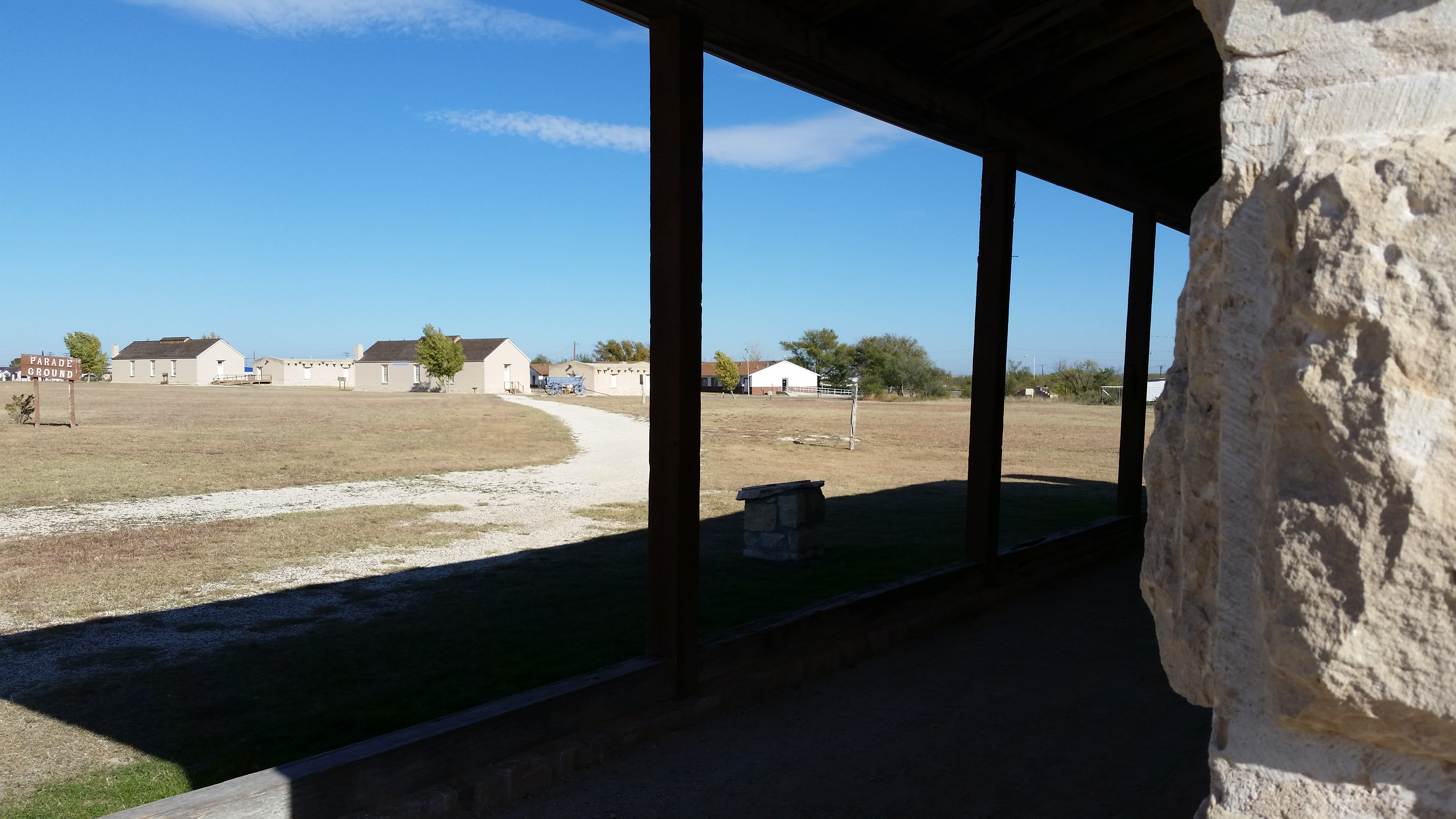
Fort Stockton parade ground and barracks

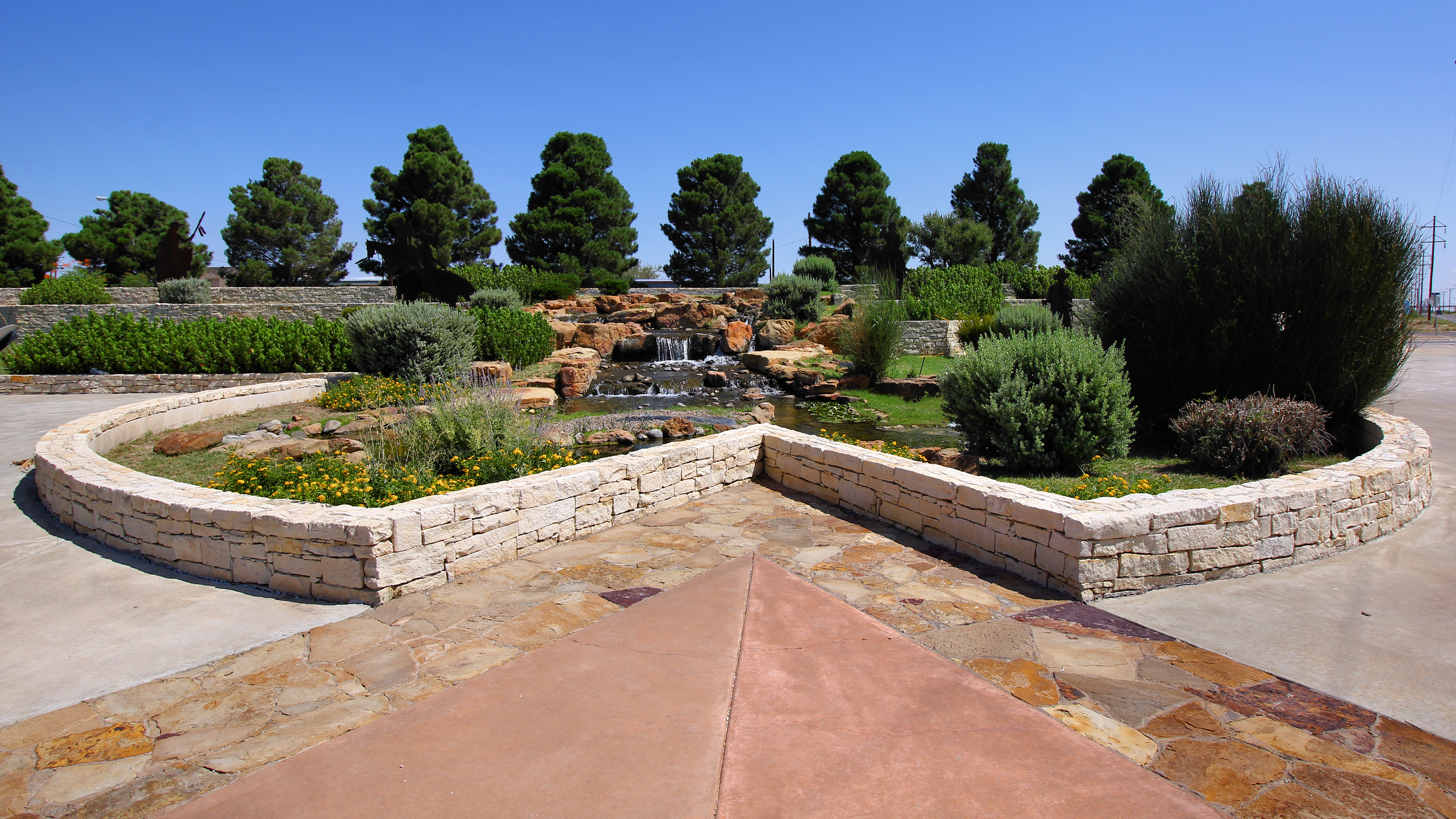
Re-creation in Fort Stockton pays homage to the now dry Comanche Springs

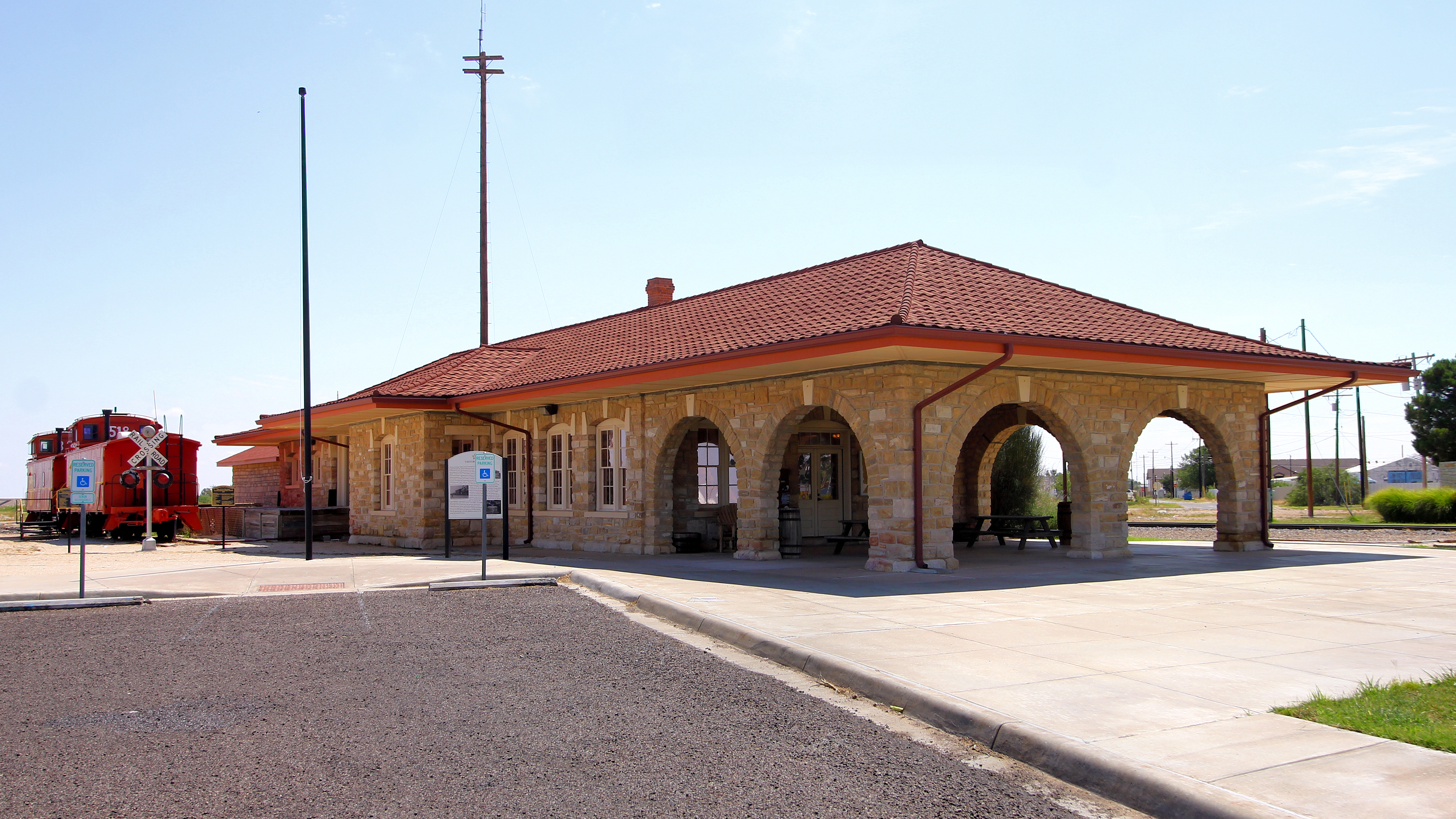
The former Kansas City, Mexico and Orient Railway depot is now the Fort Stockton Visitors' Center.

Fort Lancaster sent 1st Infantry Co. H "to take post" along Comanche Springs on 12 April 1859. Fort Stockton (named Camp Stockton until 1860) grew up around Comanche Springs, one of the largest sources of spring water in Texas. The fort was named for Robert F. Stockton. Comanche Springs was a favorite rest stop on the Great Comanche Trail to Chihuahua, San Antonio-El Paso Road, and the Butterfield Overland Mail route. On October 2, 1859, the well-known journalist and author (and future Union spy) Albert D. Richardson passed through Camp Stockton, which he described as "a military post of three or four edifices with pearly, misty mountains in the background."

In 1861, the fort was garrisoned by 39 men of Company C, 8th Infantry, under the command of Capt. Arthur Tracy Lee, who evacuated the fort by April. The Confederates took possession of the fort on 9 May by Charles L. Pyron at the outbreak of the Civil War, but soon turned command over to Capt. William C. Adams. With the failure of John Baylor's invasion of New Mexico, a general Confederate evacuation of West Texas occurred in 1862.

In 1867, the Army rebuilt the fort on a larger and more permanent basis. Other forts in the frontier fort system were Forts Griffin, Concho, Belknap, Chadbourne, Richardson, Davis, Bliss, McKavett, Clark, McIntosh, Inge, and Phantom Hill in Texas, and Fort Sill in Oklahoma. "Subposts or intermediate stations" also were used, including Bothwick's Station on Salt Creek between Fort Richardson and Fort Belknap, Camp Wichita near Buffalo Springs between Fort Richardson and Red River Station, and Mountain Pass between Fort Concho and Fort Griffin.

On 21 July 1867, Fort Stockton was reoccupied by Companies A, B, E, and K of the 9th U.S. Cavalry Regiment, buffalo soldiers under the command of General Edward Hatch, while a new fort was built one-half mile north of the first post, on the west side of the creek. Major James F. Wade took command of Troops A, B, D, and E, 9th Cavalry, and Company G, 41st Infantry, on 2 Oct. 1868. Lt. Col. Wesley Merritt assumed command of Companies A and D, 9th Cavalry, G, 24th Infantry, and K, 25th Infantry in Feb. 1871. Major Zenas Randall Bliss assumed command on 15 May 1872. Troops B, G, and L, 10th Cavalry, and Companies A and I, 1st Infantry, under Lt. Col. J.F. Wade, were stationed at the fort when the Army decided to abandon it in 1882. Major George A. Purington was the last commander when the Army finally left on 27 June 1886.

San Antonio entrepreneurs were convinced the water from the nearby Comanche and Leon Springs could be used for irrigation. They purchased large tracts of land for agricultural development. In 1868, Peter Gallagher bought the land that included the military garrison and Comanche Springs, platted 160 acres (65 ha) for a town site named Saint Gaul, and established two stores at Comanche Springs. Later, Gallagher and John James purchased 5,500 acres (2,200 ha) along Comanche Creek. By 1870, the Saint Gaul region had a population of 420 civilians, predominantly Irish, German, and Mexican Catholics who had come by way of San Antonio. The first church in Saint Gaul was Catholic. When Pecos County was organized in 1875, Saint Gaul became the county seat. The name, however, was never popular with the citizens, and on August 13, 1881, it was changed officially to Fort Stockton.

By 1870, some settlers were using the water from the Pecos River for irrigation. Seven years later, irrigated farmland comprised 7,000 acres (2,800 ha), and by 1945, the total reached 12,900 acres (5,200 ha). In 1951, Clayton Williams Sr. and other "pump farmers" west of town drilled irrigation wells that tapped into the aquifer that fed Comanche Springs. A lawsuit was filed by the Pecos County Water District #1, and 108 families who depended on the flow from the springs, to stop the pumping (Pecos County Water District #1 v. Clayton Williams et al.). On June 21, 1954, the Texas Court of Civil Appeals ruled in favor of Clayton Williams, et al. by upholding "the rule of capture", agreeing with the landmark 1904 Texas Supreme Court decision that groundwater was "too mysterious to regulate". The Texas Supreme Court affirmed the decision. By the late 1950s, Comanche Springs was dry due to the pumping. This ruling established what is known as "the rule of capture" and has regulated groundwater in Texas since. In his book, The Springs of Texas, author Gunnar Brune called the destruction of Comanche Springs, "the most spectacular example of man's abuse of nature."

After the military post was abandoned on June 30, 1886, and both the Texas and Pacific and the Southern Pacific railroads had bypassed it, Fort Stockton experienced a decline. By then, however, it was rapidly becoming the center for an extensive sheep- and cattle-ranching industry, and in 1926, the opening of the nearby Yates Oil Field brought on an economic boom. Fort Stockton was eventually served by the Kansas City, Mexico and Orient Railway at the beginning of the twentieth century.

Fort Stockton is 100 mi (160 km) southwest of Midland International Airport. The town is within driving distance of the Big Bend country, including Big Bend National Park, 137 mi (220 km), and the Big Bend Ranch State Park, 171 mi (275 km), as well as the scenery of numerous day-drive locations in the area.

== Geography ==
According to the United States Census Bureau, the city has a total area of 5.1 square miles (13 km^{2}), all land.

=== Climate ===
According to the Köppen climate classification, Fort Stockton has a hot semiarid climate, BSh on climate maps. The hottest temperature recorded in Fort Stockton was 117 °F (47.2 °C) on June 29, 1994, while the coldest temperature recorded was −6 °F (−21.1 °C) on February 2, 1985.

Climate data for Fort Stockton, Texas, 1991–2020 normals, extremes 1940–present
Month	Jan	Feb	Mar	Apr	May	Jun	Jul	Aug	Sep	Oct	Nov	Dec	Year
Record high °F (°C)	88 (31)	95 (35)	98 (37)	103 (39)	108 (42)	117 (47)	112 (44)	109 (43)	106 (41)	105 (41)	92 (33)	94 (34)	117 (47)
Mean maximum °F (°C)	80.0 (26.7)	84.0 (28.9)	89.5 (31.9)	95.1 (35.1)	101.1 (38.4)	104.5 (40.3)	102.9 (39.4)	101.7 (38.7)	98.2 (36.8)	94.2 (34.6)	85.2 (29.6)	80.2 (26.8)	106.4 (41.3)
Mean daily maximum °F (°C)	60.7 (15.9)	65.3 (18.5)	72.9 (22.7)	81.2 (27.3)	88.7 (31.5)	94.3 (34.6)	94.4 (34.7)	94.5 (34.7)	87.8 (31.0)	81.0 (27.2)	68.9 (20.5)	61.2 (16.2)	79.2 (26.2)
Daily mean °F (°C)	48.3 (9.1)	52.2 (11.2)	59.4 (15.2)	66.9 (19.4)	75.2 (24.0)	81.6 (27.6)	82.7 (28.2)	82.4 (28.0)	76.0 (24.4)	67.9 (19.9)	56.0 (13.3)	49.1 (9.5)	66.5 (19.2)
Mean daily minimum °F (°C)	35.8 (2.1)	39.0 (3.9)	45.9 (7.7)	52.7 (11.5)	61.7 (16.5)	68.9 (20.5)	71.0 (21.7)	70.3 (21.3)	64.2 (17.9)	54.9 (12.7)	43.1 (6.2)	37.0 (2.8)	53.7 (12.1)
Mean minimum °F (°C)	21.3 (−5.9)	23.8 (−4.6)	29.2 (−1.6)	36.6 (2.6)	47.6 (8.7)	60.7 (15.9)	64.6 (18.1)	63.6 (17.6)	51.7 (10.9)	38.2 (3.4)	28.4 (−2.0)	22.2 (−5.4)	17.3 (−8.2)
Record low °F (°C)	4 (−16)	−6 (−21)	1 (−17)	24 (−4)	32 (0)	41 (5)	55 (13)	51 (11)	34 (1)	22 (−6)	13 (−11)	1 (−17)	−6 (−21)
Average precipitation inches (mm)	0.65 (17)	0.46 (12)	0.58 (15)	0.79 (20)	1.41 (36)	1.85 (47)	1.79 (45)	1.76 (45)	1.97 (50)	1.29 (33)	0.62 (16)	0.49 (12)	13.66 (348)
Average snowfall inches (cm)	0.5 (1.3)	0.1 (0.25)	0.0 (0.0)	0.0 (0.0)	0.0 (0.0)	0.0 (0.0)	0.0 (0.0)	0.0 (0.0)	0.0 (0.0)	0.0 (0.0)	0.0 (0.0)	0.8 (2.0)	1.4 (3.55)
Average precipitation days (≥ 0.01 in)	3.1	2.2	2.4	2.2	4.7	4.4	4.7	4.4	5.0	3.9	2.4	2.7	42.1
Average snowy days (≥ 0.1 in)	0.2	0.2	0.0	0.0	0.0	0.0	0.0	0.0	0.0	0.0	0.0	0.2	0.6
Source 1: NOAA
Source 2: National Weather Service

== Demographics ==
Historical population
Census	Pop.	Note	%±
1920	1,297		—
1930	2,695		107.8%
1940	3,294		22.2%
1950	4,444		34.9%
1960	6,373		43.4%
1970	8,283		30.0%
1980	8,688		4.9%
1990	8,524		−1.9%
2000	7,846		−8.0%
2010	8,283		5.6%
2020	8,466		2.2%

=== 2020 census ===
As of the 2020 census, Fort Stockton had a population of 8,466 people, 2,915 households, and 2,014 families. The median age was 35.8 years; 25.0% of the residents were under 18 and 15.2% were 65 or older. For every 100 females, there were 111.8 males, and for every 100 females age 18 and over there were 112.3 males age 18 and over.

About 90.8% of residents lived in urban areas, while 9.2% lived in rural areas.

Of the 2,915 households, 36.3% had children under 18 living in them, 45.8% were married-couple households, 19.9% were households with a male householder and no spouse or partner present, and 27.8% were households with a female householder and no spouse or partner present. About 26.4% of all households were made up of individuals, and 11.0% had someone living alone who was 65 or older.

The city had 3,344 housing units, of which 12.8% were vacant. The homeowner vacancy rate was 2.0% and the rental vacancy rate was 15.0%.

Racial composition as of the 2020 census
Race	Number	Percentage
White	3,826	45.2%
Black or African American	292	3.4%
American Indian and Alaska Native	94	1.1%
Asian	93	1.1%
Native Hawaiian and other Pacific Islander	1	0.0%
Some other race	2,134	25.2%
Two or more races	2,026	23.9%
Hispanic or Latino (of any race)	6,476	76.5%

=== 2010 census ===
As of the 2010 census, 8,535 people, 2,790 households, and 2,106 families resided in the city. The population density was 1,531.3 inhabitants per square mile (591.2/km^{2}). The 3,189 housing units averaged 622.4 per square mile (240.5/km^{2}). The racial makeup of the city was 70.6% White, 0.89% African American, 0.57% Native American, 0.76% Asian, 0.01% Pacific Islander, 25.16% from other races, and 2.54% from two or more races. Hispanics or Latinos of any race were 71% of the population.

Of the 2,790 households, 39.2% had children under 18 living with them, 58.1% were married couples living together, 13.3% had a female householder with no husband present, and 24.5% were not families. About 21.7% of all households were made up of individuals, and 9.6% had someone living alone who was 65 or older. The average household size was 2.78, and the average family size was 3.25.

In the city, the age distribution was 30.1% under 18, 9.9% from 18 to 24, 25.6% from 25 to 44, 20.8% from 45 to 64, and 13.6% who were 65 or older. The median age was 33 years. For every 100 females, there were 92.1 males. For every 100 females 18 and over, there were 89.9 males.

The median income in the city for a household was $27,713 and for a family was $30,941. Males had a median income of $25,735 versus $17,885 for females. The per capita income for the city was $12,834. About 19.7% of families and 22.3% of the population were below the poverty line, including 30.6% of those under 18 and 17.7% of those 65 or over.

== Education ==
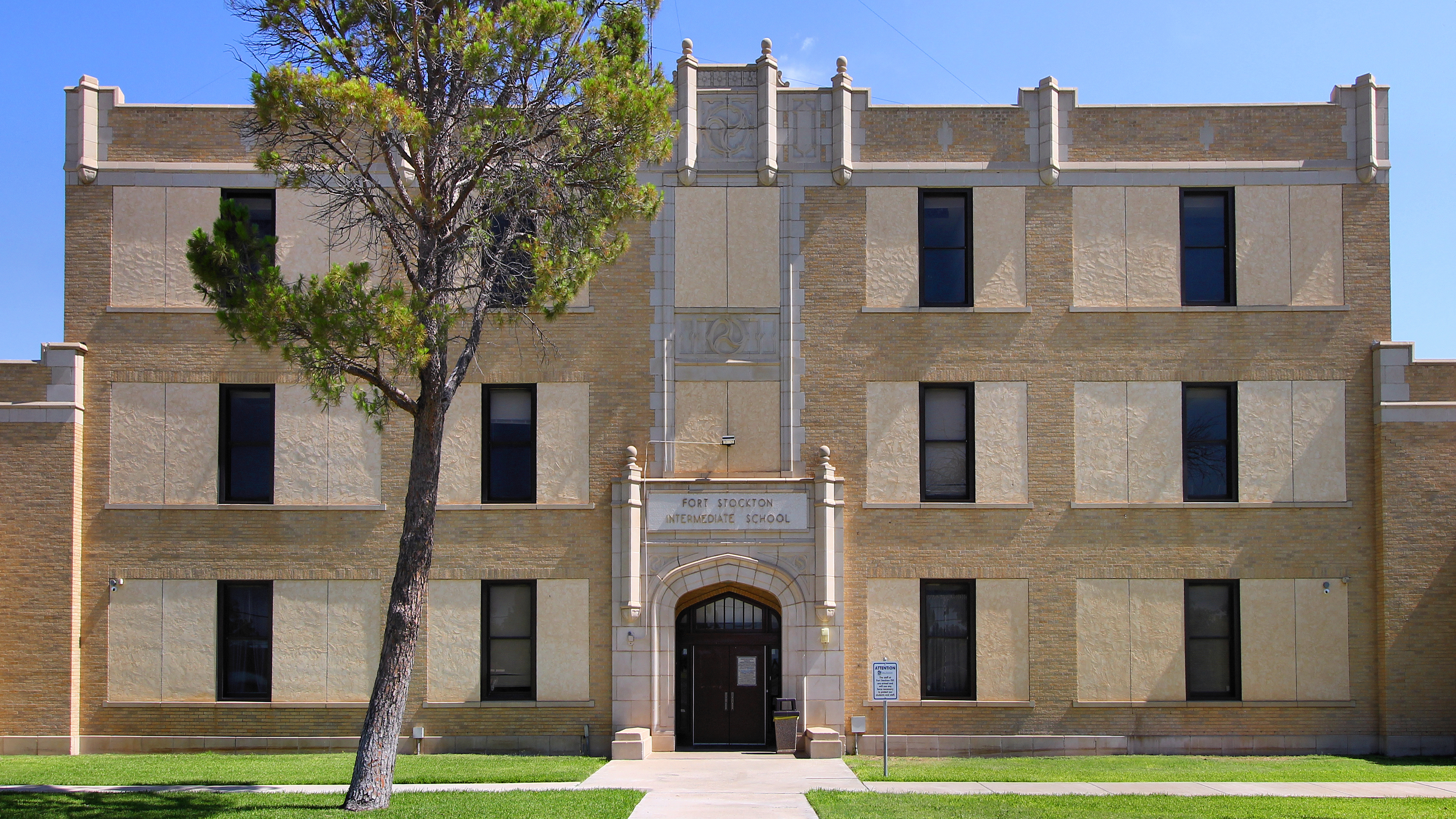
Fort Stockton Intermediate School

The City of Fort Stockton is served by the Fort Stockton Independent School District.

Fort Stockton has two elementary schools, Alamo Elementary and Apache Elementary. Apache Elementary houses kindergarten and 1st grade while Alamo Elementary houses 2nd and 3rd grade. Fort Stockton Intermediate School houses grades 4–5, while Fort Stockton Middle School houses grades 6–8 and Fort Stockton High School houses grades 9–12. The city and district share the old Alamo school building, using it for the Recreation Department to host Little League games. Another older school, Comanche, is now privately owned. Butz High School now serves as the alternative education facility. Prekindergarten services, as well as other child-care facilities, exist in town.

=== Higher education ===
The town has a Texas A&M Agrilife Extension Office, offering environmental systems management courses.

Fort Stockton is also home to the Midland College Williams Regional Technical Training Center. The center was built in 1996 through a joint effort by Midland College and leaders of Fort Stockton education, business, and government as a means to enhance higher education and workforce development in this part of West Texas. Fort Stockton and Pecos County are part of the Midland College service area. After just four years, the facility, named in honor of Fort Stockton native and WRTTC donor Clayton Williams Jr., doubled in size through fundraising and program development.

== Infrastructure ==
=== Transportation ===
Fort Stockton is served by All Aboard America!'s twice daily route between Midland International Air and Space Port and Presidio, with intermediate stops at Odessa, Crane, McCamey, Alpine, and Marfa.

== Notable people ==
- Walter L. Buenger (born 1951), historian of Texas and the American South at Texas A&M University, was reared in Fort Stockton
- Terri Hoffman, Religious cult leader
- Gerald Lyda, Texas building contractor and owner of La Escalera Ranch
- Blaine McCallister, professional golfer
- Annie F. Riggs, Hotel Entrepreneur, Pioneer woman
