= LehtMoJoe =

American rapper

- Origin: Dallas, Texas, United States
- Genres: Electronic, hip hop
- Label: HealthRyder Music
- Website: http://lehtmojoe.com

LehtMoJoe is an American record producer and musician.

== Career ==
LehtMoJoe's stage name combines the names of his favorite Dallas Stars ice hockey players during the late nineteen-nineties, Jere Lehtinen, Mike Modano and Joe Nieuwendyk.

In 2009, Leht released a solo album, Spaghetti Western, while hosting a live hip hop show at the Granada Theater in Dallas. Spaghetti Western tracks, together with a string of smart remixes, received significant attention on the local Dallas music scene and international airplay through The Hype Machine Radio, BBC Radio 1 and Mark Ronson’s Authentic Shit. Official remixes released by Röyksopp, Dragonette, Au Revoir Simone, Trafik and Major Lazer established Leht on the electronic music scene.

== Discography ==
=== Albums ===
- #nofilter (2014), LehtMoJoe
- Ride On (2012), LehtMoJoe
- Aisle7 (2011), LehtMoJoe
- The Intervention (2010), AnonymousCulture
- Spaghetti Western (2009), LehtMoJoe
- RemixONE (2009), LehtMoJoe
- Attention, Center of (2007), Free Agent

=== Remixes ===
Year	Artist	Title
2005	NIN	"Only (Leht 99 Remix)"
2007	50 Cent vs. Paul McCartney	"Christmas in Da Club"
2009	ELO vs. David Bowie	"Suffragette Woman"
2009	Michael Jackson	"Beat It"
2009	Au Revoir Simone	"Another Likely Story"
2009	Major Lazer	"Hold the Line"
2009	Common	"Gladiator"
2009	The Hives	"Main Offender"
2009	Dragonette	"Pick Up The Phone"
2009	Smashing Pumpkins	"Cherub Rock"
2009	Foo Fighters	"D.O.A."
2009	Nirvana	"Territorial Pissings"
2009	Peter Bjorn and John	"Nothing to Worry About"
2009	Daniel Merriweather	"Change"
2009	Röyksopp	"This Must Be It"
2009	Trafik	"Paid Up in Full"
2009	White Stripes	"Blue Orchid"
2010	Giggle Party	"Big Bang"
2010	Pantera	"Cowboys From Hell"
2010	GalleryCat vs Mount Righteous	"Childhood"
2010	Kontaktor	"Bocce Ball"
2010	Paul McCartney vs. Soulja Boy	"Christmas Swag"
2011	The Strokes vs. Lupe Fiasco	"Machu Picchu Goes On"
2011	DJ Eric Ill	"Dirty Secret"
2011	Pepper Rabbit	"Murder Room"
2011	Dale Earnhardt Jr. Jr.	"Morning Thought"
2011	311	"Wild Nights"
