= Walter L. Buenger =

American historian

Walter Louis Buenger
- Born: January 19, 1951 (age 75); Fort Stockton, Pecos County; Texas, USA
- Occupations: Historian; Professor at University of Texas
- Spouse: Victoria L. "Vickie" Buenger
- Children: Carl Davis Buenger; Erin Buenger (1997-2009)
- Parent(s): Walter and Janice T. Buenger

Academic background
- Education: Rice University

Walter Louis Buenger (born January 19, 1951) is a historian of Texas, the American South, and the Southwest Border. He retired as a professor of history at the University of Texas in Austin, Texas in 2024.

== Background ==
Buenger received all three of his degrees, Bachelor of Arts, Master of Arts, and Ph.D., from Rice University in Houston in 1973, 1977, and 1979, respectively. Immediately thereafter at the age of twenty-eight, he joined the history faculty at Texas A&M University. He became head of the History department in 2002 and remained there until 2017 when he accepted the position of Summerlee Foundation Chair in Texas History at the University of Texas at Austin. Simultaneously, he became the Chief Historian at the Texas State Historical Association (TSHA) and editor of the TSHA journal Southwestern Historical Quarterly.

== Scholarly pursuits ==
Buenger's 2001 book The Path to a Modern South: Northeast Texas Between Reconstruction and the Great Depression was awarded the Coral H. Tullis Award, given annually to a book that focuses on Texas. He is a fellow, past president (2009–2010), and past Chief Historian of the Texas State Historical Association.

== Comments on Texas History Curriculum Controversy ==
In September 2018, it was announced that a work group tasked with advising the State Board of Education on social studies curriculum revisions had proposed that educators refrain from calling defenders of The Alamo as "heroic" The recommendation drew the ire of Republican Governor Greg Abbott, a candidate for re-election in the November 6 general, who urged voters to express opposition to the proposal to their district member on the Texas Board of Education. The recommendation was among several hundred additions, deletions, and tweaks offered by the advisory the panel. The committee said "heroic" is "a value(s)-charged word." Buenger said that he could understand why the word 'heroic' is divisive: "Many times the Alamo gets boiled down, as it often does in movies, to the Mexicans are the bad guys and the good guys are good Anglos in coonskin caps." He noted that at least six Mexicans, calling themselves Texians, fought with the American defenders: "Part of the problem with the word heroic may be that it's too simplistic," Buenger added. After public hearings were conducted, the Board of Education voted to amend the Texas history curriculum to refer "to the heroism of the diverse defenders who gave their lives" at the Alamo.

== Family ==
Walter is married to Vickie Luquette Buenger who retired from her academic appointment as Clinical Professor of Management in the Mays Business School Department at Texas A&M University in 2022. The Buenger family is of German descent.

The Buengers, who have homes in Bryan, Texas and Austin, Texas, have a son, Carl Davis Buenger (born ca. 1988), who graduated from Rice University in 2010 with a mathematics degree in 2010 and from the Ohio State University with a PhD in mathematics in 2016. Their daughter, Erin Channing Buenger, died in 2009 of neuroblastoma pediatric cancer at the age of eleven. Former U.S. Representative Chet Edwards, a Buenger family friend, co-sponsored a successful bill to earmark $150 million toward a cure for neuroblastoma and other cancers. The measure was signed into law by U.S. President George W. Bush in July 2008.

| Preceded by Frances B. Vick | President of the Texas State Historical Association; 2009–2010 | Succeeded by Dianne Garrett Powell |
