= Jane Johnson Endsley =

American businesswoman

- Born: circa 1848
- Died: 1933 (aged 85)
- Known for: Businesswoman

Jane Johnson Endsley (c. 1848–1933) was a successful Dallas businesswomen and community leader. A former slave, Endsley eventually ran one of the city's largest railroad-yard coal and log businesses.

== Biography ==
Endsley was born into slavery in Jefferson, where she worked on a plantation. In 1862, she married Moses Calloway, and the two moved to Rowlett. The couple started out as sharecroppers, but eventually owned their own farm. Together, they had eleven children.

Endsley took over as the manager of the 100-acre family farm when her husband died in the late 1880s or early 1890s. The farm was in Dallas County and had been assessed in 1882 to be worth $15,150 (~$423,390 in 2024). Endlsley would take her own cotton to the local cotton gin, and defended her hard work from theft, even accidentally killing a white man who attempted to steal her cotton. She was never prosecuted for striking the man; since another "white man who witnessed the accident apparently took the blame for it." Endsley married three times after her first husband, all ending in divorce until she married H.E. Endsley in 1914.

She sold her farm, retaining the timber rights on the land, and set up her own rail-yard coal and log business in Dallas. Her sons, Joe, Lube and Emmett, helped her run the business, which became very lucrative.

Endsley's home had the only telephone in the neighborhood for many years, and she allowed neighbors to use it. She and others helped found the Macedonia Baptist Church, which eventually became a 5,000 member congregation called the Good Street Baptist Church. She also started a lodge within the Household of Ruth in the 1920s. Endsley and her daughter Maggie, reached out to the hungry and poor, especially during the Great Depression.

Endsley died in her home on Collins Street in Dallas in 1933. She was buried in Rowlett.
