= Fort Phantom Hill =

US Army fort in Texas, used 1852–1890s

- U.S. National Register of Historic Places
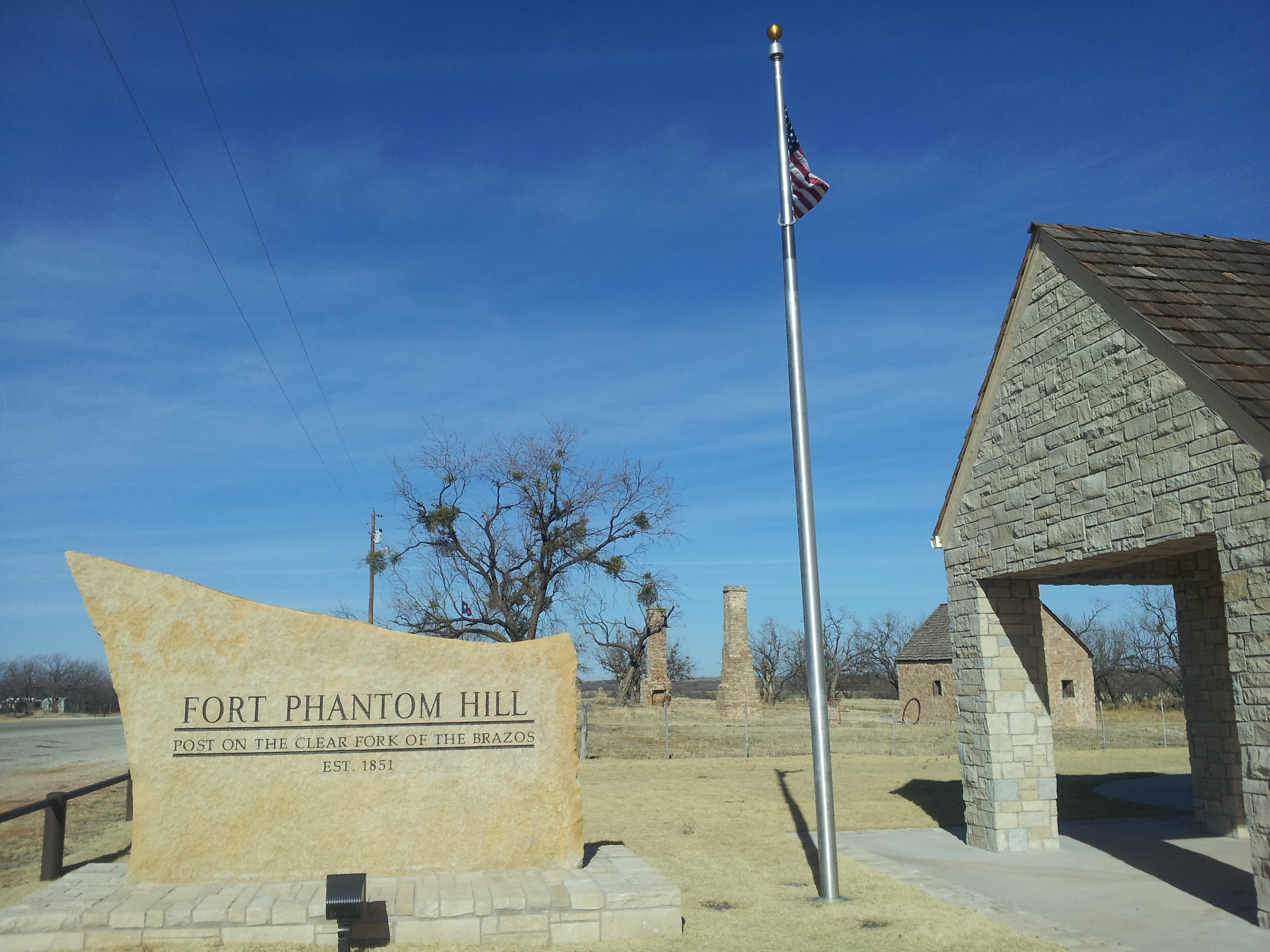
- Fort Phantom Hill entrance

- Location within Texas Location within the United States
- Nearest city: Abilene, Texas
- Coordinates: 32°38′38″N 99°40′41″W
- Area: 20 acres (8.1 ha)
- Built: 1851
- NRHP reference No.: 72001367
- Added to NRHP: September 14, 1972

Fort Phantom Hill, also called the Camp on the Clear Fork, (Note: According to Wright and the Handbook of Texas, Fort Phantom Hill was referred to in Army correspondence as the "Post on the Clear Fork of the Brazos". Frazer states that the post was known officially as either Fort Phantom Hill and the Camp on the Clear Fork.) is a former United States Army installation located in Jones County, Texas. The fort was established in 1851 as part of a line of forts in Texas to protect migrants passing through the state on their way to California. The US Army abandoned the fort in 1854 and it was shortly thereafter mostly destroyed by fire. In 1858, it became a station of the Butterfield-Overland Mail route until it moved out of Texas with the beginning of the American Civil War in 1861. During the war, the fort was occupied by Confederate frontier troops until the Confederacy's defeat and surrender. Following the US Army's return to Texas after the Civil War, Fort Phantom Hill was used as a subpost of the larger, newer Fort Griffin until 1875.

After its final abandonment in 1875, a town was established at Fort Phantom Hill that flourished in the 1870s and ceased to exist by 1900. Following the fort's purchase by John Guitar in 1928, there was renewed public interest in the fort that led to its opening to the public in 1972. In 1997, Fort Phantom Hill was transferred to the Fort Phantom Hill Foundation. The ruins of the fort were added to the National Register of Historic Places on September 14, 1972.

== Use as military outpost ==
Fort Phantom Hill was established during the American colonization of Texas, a process that began in the 1820s with the immigration of Anglo-Americans into Spanish, later Mexican, Texas. After existing as an independent republic for a decade, Texas was annexed by the United States of America in 1845, which led to the start of the Mexican-American War the next year. The United States defeated Mexico, and in the treaty that ended the war in 1848, Mexico ceded what is presently the Southwestern United States in exchange for $15 million (equivalent to $558 million in 2025). The United States Army began to construct outposts and roads in Texas during the war to protect Anglo-American settlements in the state. In 1849, an unprecedented number of migrants began crossing Texas to reach California following the discovery of gold there.

Those migrants moved along routes such as the Marcy Trail, charted by Captain Randolph B. Marcy in 1849, through the territory of the indigenous peoples of the Great Plains. To protect those migrants, the US Army established a line of forts running for 800 miles (1,300 km) from Fort Worth, in the northeast, to Fort Duncan, in the southwest, in 1848–49 and then another, 200 miles (320 km) west, from 1850 to 1852. The forts of this line – Belknap, Chadbourne, Clark, Davis, Mason, McKavett, Phantom Hill, Stockton, and Terrett – were established in the early 1850s at places Marcy recommended. One of these locations was the Clear Fork of the Brazos River, which Marcy erroneously noted in 1849 as possessing abundant water and game.

=== Use as permanent garrison, 1851–1854 ===
In 1851, General William G. Belknap, commander of the Seventh Military District—an area corresponding to the present states of Arkansas and Oklahoma—visited the Brazos River valley with Marcy to find locations for outposts. Belknap began construction of what became Fort Belknap, and identified a nearby tributary, Pecan Bayou, as ideal for a second post on the Brazos. On November 3, General Persifor Frazer Smith, commander of the Department of Texas, ordered that an outpost be created upon the "Phantom Hill" overlooking the Clear Fork, 20 mi (32 km) from Pecan Bayou.

I cannot believe that God ever intended white man to occupy such a barren waste.

— Lieutenant Clinton Lear, 5th Infantry, 1852

On November 14, 1851, five companies of the 5th Infantry Regiment, commanded by Lieutenant Colonel John Joseph Abercrombie, arrived on Phantom Hill and established the Camp on the Clear Fork of the Brazos, better known as Fort Phantom Hill. Construction of Fort Phantom Hill began immediately and lasted until June 1852, and it was followed by the creation of a crude road to Fort Chadbourne, to the southwest. Construction and basic life at the fort was complicated by a lack of usable wood, water, game, and fertile soil. The garrison had to rely on food shipments from Austin, 250 miles (400 km) away, that were occasionally seized by indigenous peoples, and the garrison could not abate the water shortage even by digging an 80-foot (24 m) well. Pestilences such as tuberculosis and rheumatism and the poor supply of food and water also plagued the garrison.

Fort Phantom Hill and the other outposts of the US Army in Texas were unfortified cantonments, where troops could recuperate after being on campaign. Before being razed, the fort buildings consisted of jacales with the exception of the officers' quarters, built of timber, and the magazine, guardhouse, and commissary, built of stone. Each building had a stone chimney. Stone was sourced from a quarry at the Elm Fork on the Brazos River while blackjack oak was transported from up to 40 miles (64 km) away. The structures of the fort were arranged around a parade ground. Officers' quarters lined the north and east sides, opposite the enlisted men's barracks, while administrative structures stood on the west side. Additional buildings, such as the magazine and bakery, were located away from the parade ground and its surrounding structures.

On April 27, 1852, Abercrombie was replaced as commander of Fort Phantom Hill by Lieutenant Colonel Carlos Waite. Waite was replaced by Major Henry Hopkins Sibley on September 23, 1853, who oversaw the withdrawal from the post of four of its five companies and their replacement by a company of the 2nd Dragoons. In August 1853, the fort was inspected by Colonel William G. Freeman, who found it and its garrison in poor condition. The fort was ordered abandoned on April 6, 1854, along with Forts Mason and Terrett. Shortly after the garrison's departure, the fort was burned, probably by the departing soldiers.

=== Subsequent use, 1854–1871 ===
Following Fort Phantom Hill's abandonment, it was still frequently visited by travelers and US Army troops. Among the latter was Robert E. Lee, who as a lieutenant colonel of the 2nd Dragoons passed by the fort on June 16, 1856, while in pursuit of the Comanche leader Sanaco. In February 1861, Texas seceded from the United States and joined the Confederate States of America. Major General David E. Twiggs, commander of the Department of Texas since 1857, surrendered its equipment and installations in Texas to the Confederacy and abandoned the state as the American Civil War began.

On March 4, 1861, LeRoy Pope Walker, the Confederate Secretary of War, ordered career soldier Benjamin McCulloch to raise a volunteer force of ten companies to defend Texas's frontier. McCulloch passed the task to his brother, Colonel Henry Eustace McCulloch, who distributed his forces across the former US Army installations in Texas. One of McCulloch's officers, Major James Buckner Barry, stationed a portion of his command at Fort Phantom Hill. After a campaign against the Comanche in 1861 quieted the frontier, McCulloch's troops were sent to fight in the Trans-Mississippi theater as part of the 1st Texas Cavalry Regiment. They were replaced with the Frontier Regiment, who also encamped at Fort Phantom Hill and were also increasingly pulled away from the frontier as the war continued.

=== Use as satellite post, 1871–1875 ===
Confederate forces began to surrender to the federal government in 1865, heralding the end of the Civil War. In June, the remaining Confederate forces in Texas formally surrendered to the US Army, who reoccupied the state. After initially ignoring Texans' concerns about indigenous raiding in favor of reoccupying prewar installations along the border with Mexico, the US Army returned to the frontier and began expanding its presence there in 1866–67. From 1869 until the end of the Red River War in 1875, Fort Phantom Hill's ruins were occupied several times by US Army troops as a subpost of Fort Griffin, established in 1867 along the Clear Fork of the Brazos.

== Civilian use ==
White settlement in what became Jones County, Texas, began in November 1851 with Fort Phantom Hill and an Indian agent named Jesse Stem, who operated a farmstead near the fort until he was killed by Tonkawa natives in February 1854. As the fort neared completion, more settlers established themselves in the area but not in sufficient numbers to justify its retention by the US Army in 1854. In 1858, three of the fort's stone buildings were repaired and used for a station of the Butterfield Overland Mail along its route through Texas until it moved out of the state with the beginning of the Civil War in 1861. Jones County was established on February 1, 1858, and during the Civil War it suffered from raids by indigenous peoples that halted white settlement in the county for 15 years.

After the Red River War, a settlement was formed on Fort Phantom Hill's grounds that primarily serviced buffalo hunters roaming the region. The town grew to a population of 546 and briefly was the Jones County seat in 1881, but when the Texas and Pacific Railway bypassed Phantom Hill in favor of Abilene, 14 mi (23 km) to the south, the town began a rapid decline. By 1900, the town had ceased to exist, though the fort continued to be inhabited until at least 1913. From July 1918 to August 1919, test wells were dug near the fort by the Fort Phantom Hill Oil Company following the discovery of oil to the south in 1915.

== Preservation ==
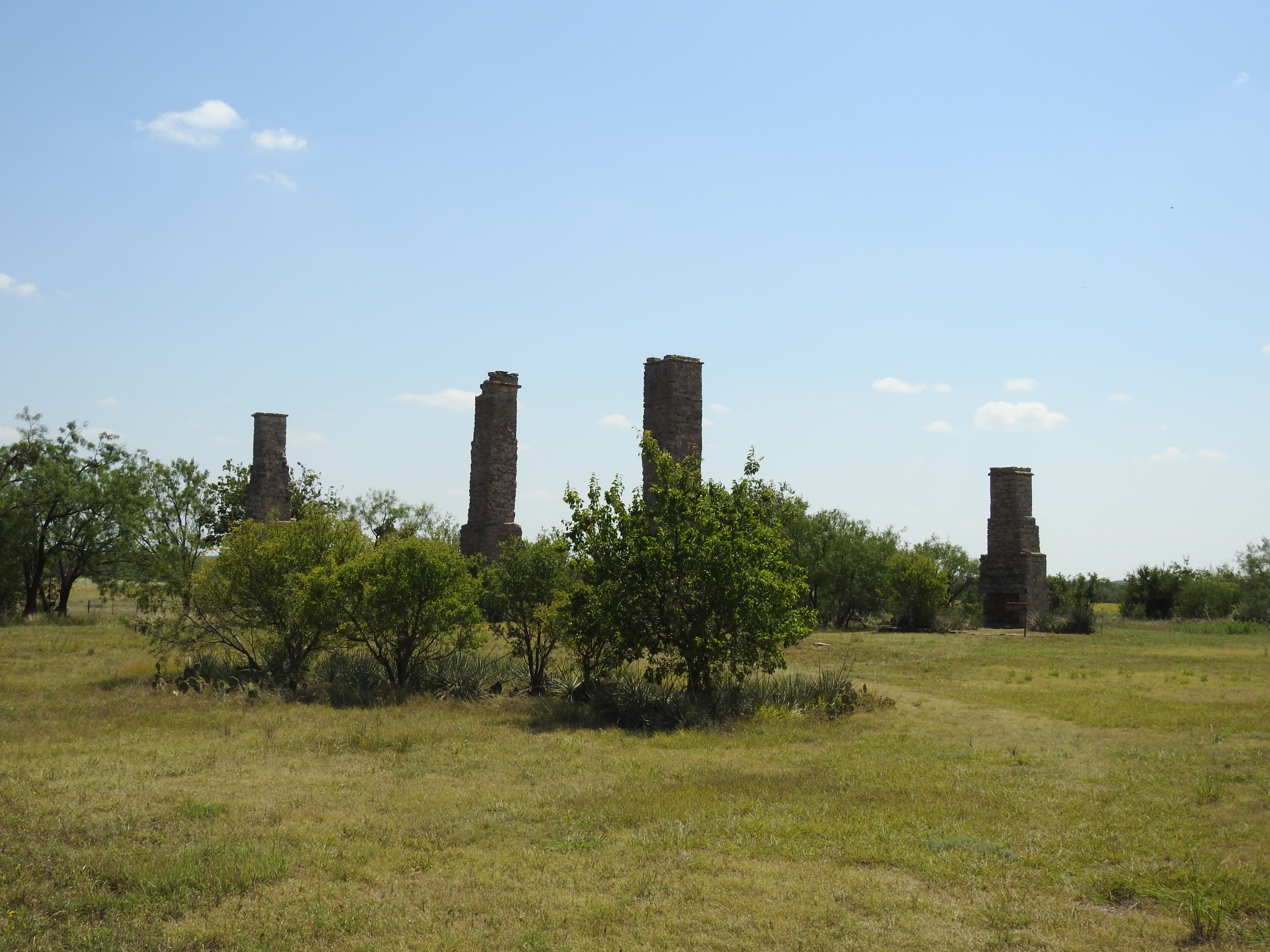
Chimneys at Fort Phantom Hill

In 1928, the grounds of Fort Phantom Hill were purchased by John Guitar, who then sold the land in 1969 to his grandson, Jim Alexander. Guitar's purchase of the fort attracted the attention of Carl Coke Rister, a historian, professor at Hardin-Simmons University, and secretary of the West Texas Historical Association, who wrote extensively about the fort to promote its preservation. In 1970, the fort was excavated by the Texas state archaeologist, Curtis Tunnell, and on September 14, 1972, it was included on the National Register of Historic Places following its nomination by the Texas Historical Commission on January 31, 1972. The Alexanders opened the fort to the public in the same year and in 1997 they gifted its grounds to the Fort Phantom Foundation. Another, more complete excavation of the fort's grounds was carried out in 1998 by Texas Tech University. The Texas Department of Transportation constructed a rest stop along the southern edge of the fort's grounds in 2012.

As of December 2022, Fort Phantom Hill consists of three stone structures and 12 stone chimneys standing on a 38-acre (15 ha) site.

Four historical markers have been placed on the grounds of Fort Phantom Hill or its vicinity by the state of Texas. The first, placed in 1936, generally commemorated the fort and was replaced with another marker after the original disappeared in 2010. Another marker, commemorating the fort's use by Confederate forces, was placed on the grounds of the Jones County Courthouse in 1963. A marker for the fort's graveyard was placed in the graveyard in 2019.

== See also ==
- National Register of Historic Places listings in Jones County, Texas
- Texas Forts Trail

== Notes ==
=== Sources ===
- "Fort Phantom Hill (National Register of Historic Places Inventory – Nomination)" (PDF). National Park Service. January 1972.

==== Books and articles ====
- Alexander, Thomas E.; Utley, Dan K. (2015). Echoes of Glory: Historic Military Sites Across Texas. Texas A&M University Press. ISBN 978-1-62349-337-0.
- Graham, Roy Eugene (October 1970). "Federal Fort Architecture in Texas during the Nineteenth Century". The Southwestern Historical Quarterly. 74 (2): 165–188.
- Field, Ron (2006). Forts of the American Frontier 1820–91: The Southern Plains and Southwest. Fortress. Osprey Publishing. ISBN 978-1-84603-040-6.
- Frazer, Robert Walter (1965). Forts of the West: Military Forts and Presidios, and Posts Commonly Called Forts, West of the Mississippi River to 1898. University of Oklahoma Press. ISBN 9780806112503.
- Robinson, Willard B. (1977). American Forts: Architectural Form and Function. Amon Carter Museum of American Art. ISBN 978-0-25200-589-3.
- Uglow, Loyd (2001). Standing in the Gap: Army Outposts, Picket Stations, and the Pacification of the Texas Frontier, 1866–1886. Texas Christian University Press. ISBN 978-0-87565-246-7.
- Wright, Bill (2013). Fort Phantom Hill: The Mysterious Ruins on the Clear Fork of the Brazos River. State House Press. ISBN 9781933337586.

==== Texas State Historical Association ====
- Anderson, H. Allen (October 22, 2020) [1976]. "Fort Phantom Hill". Handbook of Texas Online. Archived from the original on August 17, 2022.
- Bauer, K. Jack (March 22, 2016) [1952]. "Mexican War". Handbook of Texas Online. Archived from the original on July 8, 2022.
- Buenger, Walter L. (February 24, 2021) [1952]. "Secession". Handbook of Texas Online. Archived from the original on November 6, 2019.
- Cutrer, Thomas W.; Smith, David Paul (October 1, 1995) [1952]. "Twiggs, David Emanuel". Handbook of Texas Online. Archived from the original on January 26, 2023.
- Cutrer, Thomas W. (December 9, 2020) [1952]. "Marcy, Randolph Barnes". Handbook of Texas Online. Archived from the original on February 21, 2023.
- Cutrer, Thomas W. (November 13, 2018) [1952]. "Belknap, William Goldsmith". Handbook of Texas Online. Archived from the original on February 21, 2023.
- Dunnam, Robert (November 16, 2009) [1952]. "Frontier Regiment". Handbook of Texas Online. Archived from the original on March 4, 2023.
- Henson, Margaret S. (January 4, 2021) [1995]. "Anglo-American Colonization". Handbook of Texas Online. Archived from the original on July 25, 2022.
- Lynch, Vernon (July 19, 2016) [1952]. "Fort Griffin". Handbook of Texas Online. Archived from the original on March 5, 2023.
- Neu, C. T. (November 1, 1994) [1976]. "Annexation". Handbook of Texas Online. Archived from the original on October 19, 2022.
- Odintz, Mark (November 11, 2020) [1976]. "Jones County". Handbook of Texas Online. Archived from the original on August 14, 2022.
- Smith, David Paul (January 1, 1995). "First Regiment, Texas Mounted Riflemen". Handbook of Texas Online. Archived from the original on March 4, 2023.
- Wooster, Ralph A. (May 26, 2021) [1952]. Derbs, Brett J. (ed.). "Civil War". Handbook of Texas Online. Archived from the original on March 5, 2023.
