= Texas Plains Trail =

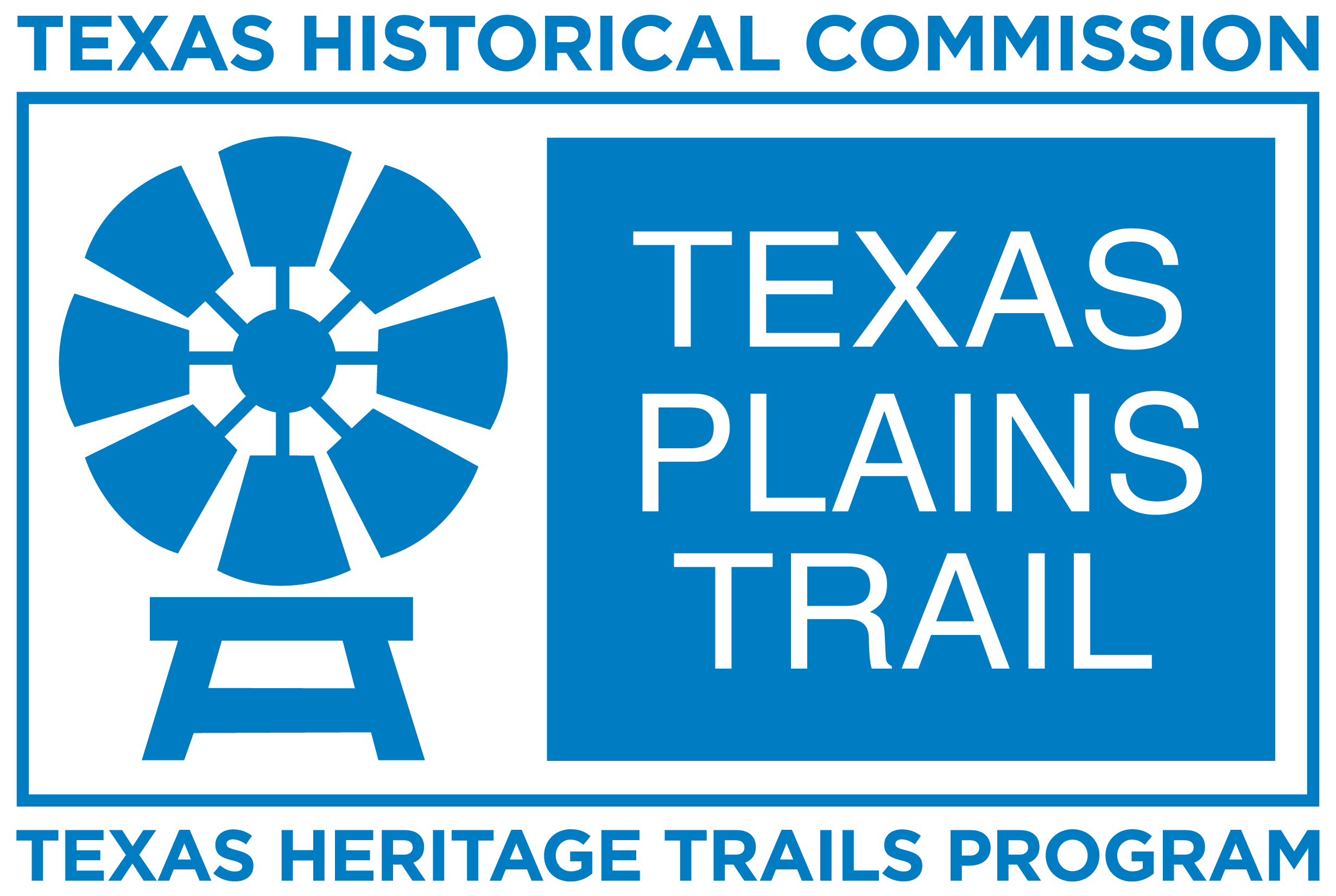
- Logo of the Texas Plains Trail Region

- Nickname: TPTR
- Formation: 1968, 2003
- Type: Nonprofit
- Purpose: Heritage tourism, Economic Development, Historical Preservation
- Headquarters: Lubbock, Texas
- Region served: South Plains, Texas Panhandle
- Parent organization: Texas Historical Commission
- Website: texastimetravel.com/regions/plains-trail/

The Texas Plains Trail is a nonprofit organization which promotes heritage tourism, economic development, and historic preservation in a 52 county region in the Texas Panhandle and Texas South Plains. The headquarters of the organization is in Lubbock, Texas. Founded as part of John Connally's 1968 initiative to boost tourism in the state during HemisFair '68, the Texas Plains Trail is one of 10 travel trails that cover the entire state. Originally designed as a driving tour that encompassed more than 580 miles via designated roads adorned with iconic blue highway signs, the trail was reestablished as a nonprofit organization in 2003 as part of the broader Texas Heritage Trails Program and their efforts to stimulate economic growth by boosting tourism and historic preservation throughout Texas.

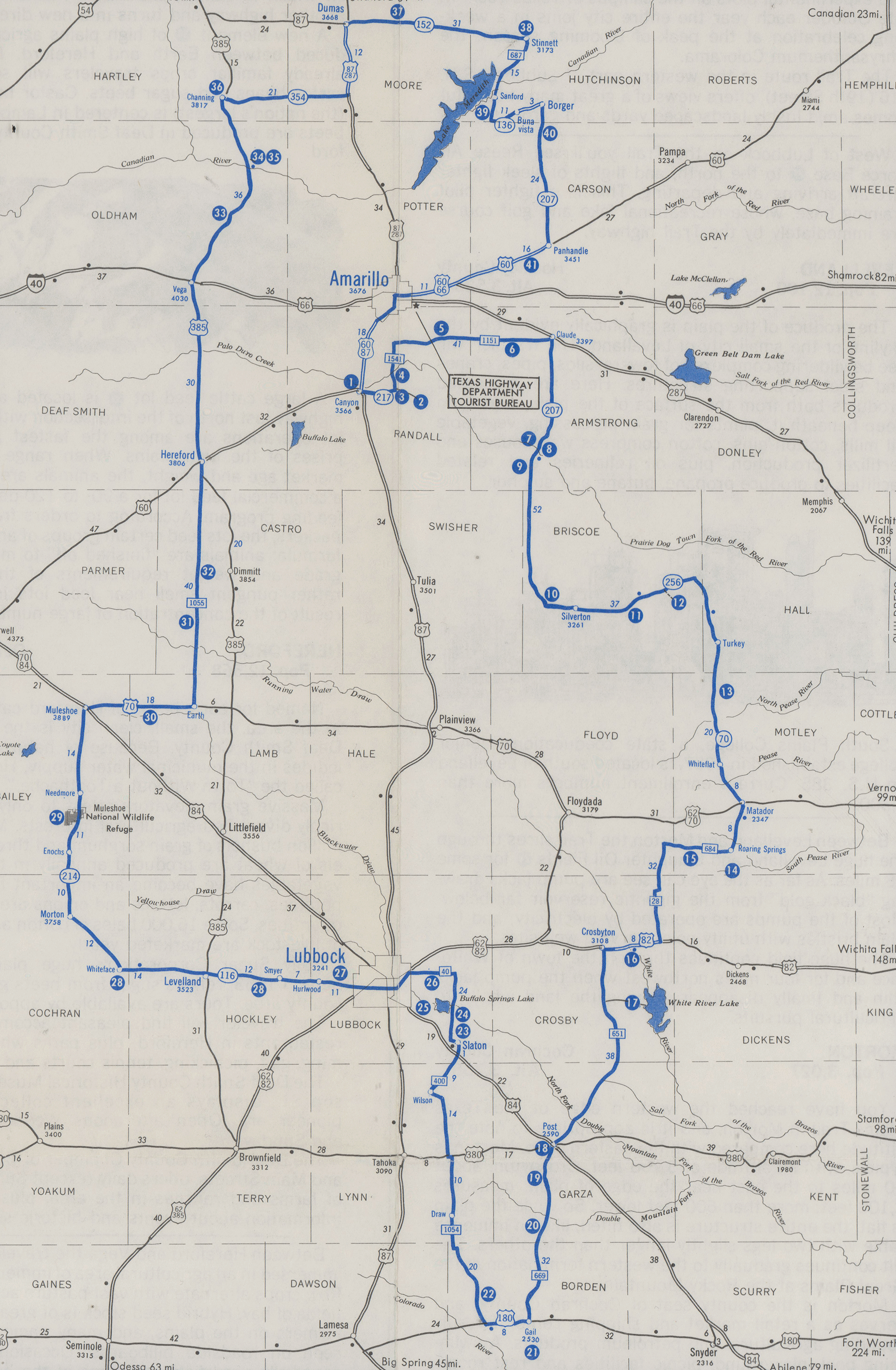
1968 Texas Plains Trail map

== History ==
=== Origin ===
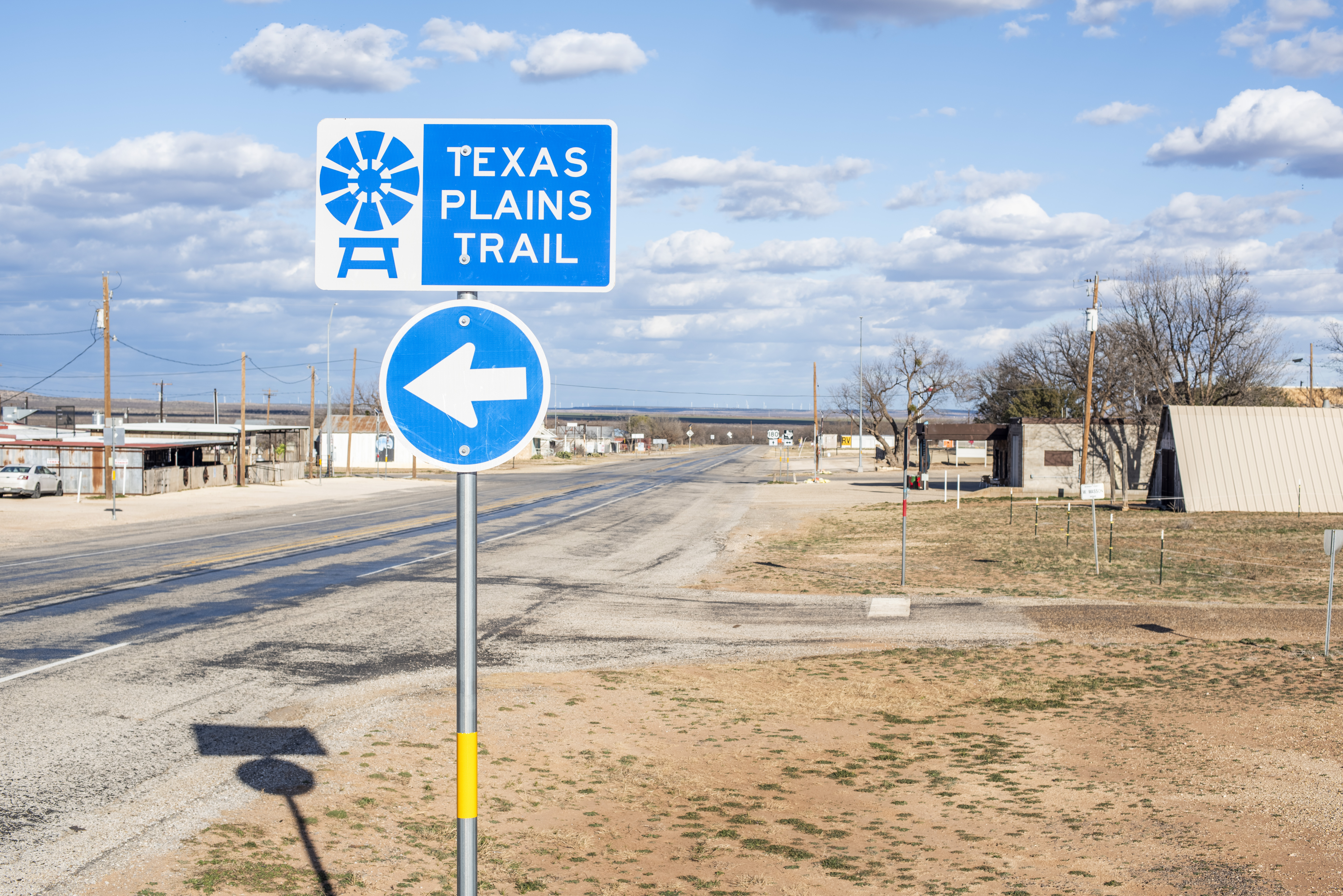
Texas Plains Trail sign near Gail, Texas

At the third annual Tourist Development Conference in Austin, Texas, Texas governor John Connolly announced 10 travel trails that circuited the state to encourage tourists from across the state and nation to visit and see various parts of the state in coordination with the 1968 World's Fair that was hosted in San Antonio, Texas.

The roughly 580 mile highway route looped across 23 counties in the Texas Panhandle and South Plains. The trail generally avoided major interstate highways, instead focusing on lesser-used roads and byways that revolved around the major population centers of Amarillo and Lubbock. Promotional maps published in 1968 highlighted 41 historic and cultural sites ranging from Palo Duro Canyon State Park, the Muleshoe National Wildlife Refuge, the Levelland and Slaughter Oil Fields, and other local industry and commerce sites. The trail also noted agricultural products such as feed lots, cotton fields, and native grass ranchland.

Roads along the original route features blue highway signage that defined the trail and directed travelers regarding which direction to travel at intersections with arrows pointing drivers the correct direction. Communities along the trail were tasked with paying for the signs to appear on highways along the trail.

Tourism to Texas increased during the 1968 season, but extended and prolonged use of the trail decreased as advertising and promotion of the Texas Travel Trails slowed. Politicians used the trail to plan their campaign stops, and several lectures discussing the trail were held to maintain interest in the trail and its features. In 1973, the Texas Tourist Development Agency attempted to bring more interest to the trails nationwide by spending $13,900 in magazine advertisements that would reach a circulation of more than one million subscribers.

=== Reestablishment ===
During the 75th Texas Legislature that occurred in 1997, the legislature tasked the Texas Historical Commission to investigate utilizing the trails regions to revitalize tourism in the state. In 1998, the commission formed a new heritage tourism initiative to invigorate tourism in the state by utilizing the 10 travel trails to segment the state into regions of focus for tourism development. This initiative initially focused on the Texas Forts Trail, and a standalone organization using that name was formed by the end of 1998 with an official inauguration for the region occurring in October 1998. An interim board of regional officials hired the first regional coordinator for the Texas Forts Trail in 1999. The Texas Historical Commission sought applications for two additional trails regions in 1999. These additions included the Texas Forest Trail and the Texas Independence Trail

In May 2002, an organizational meeting hosted by the Texas Historical Commission was held in Tulia, Texas to discuss with regional partners the possibility of forming the Texas Plains Trail as one of the next designated trails region. Over the next several months, several city councils and county commissioners approved resolutions to support the formation of a Texas Plains Trail organization.

The Texas Historical Commission designated the Texas Plains Trail as the sixth trails region in mid-2003. Accordingly, the Texas Historical Commission agreed to provide the trail with marketing, technical, and financial assistance for at least three years after the designation. 52 counties were added to the region ranging from as far north as the Oklahoma state line in the northern Texas Panhandle to as far south as Mitchell County and Colorado City. As opposed to the original 1968 plan that only focused on specific counties and communities along a road and highway route, the new initiative formed a cohesive 52-county region that attempted to spur cooperation among communities across the region.

The first board meeting for the Texas Plains Trail occurred on October 28, 2003, at the Algerita Art Center in Post, Texas. At this meeting, officers were elected including Phil Barefield as president, Bobbye Hill as vice president, Lynn Hopkins as secretary, and Marie Neff as treasurer. In mid-2004, Melissa Shackelford of Borger Texas was hired as the region's first regional coordinator. Glenn Barnett was named as the group's second coordinator in July 2005, and Deborah Sue McDonald was named coordinator in 2008. McDonald held the position until 2012. Barbara Brannon was hired in early 2013 as executive director of the organization. She held that position until 2019. The current executive director, Allison Kendrick, began her duties in December 2019.

== Initiatives ==
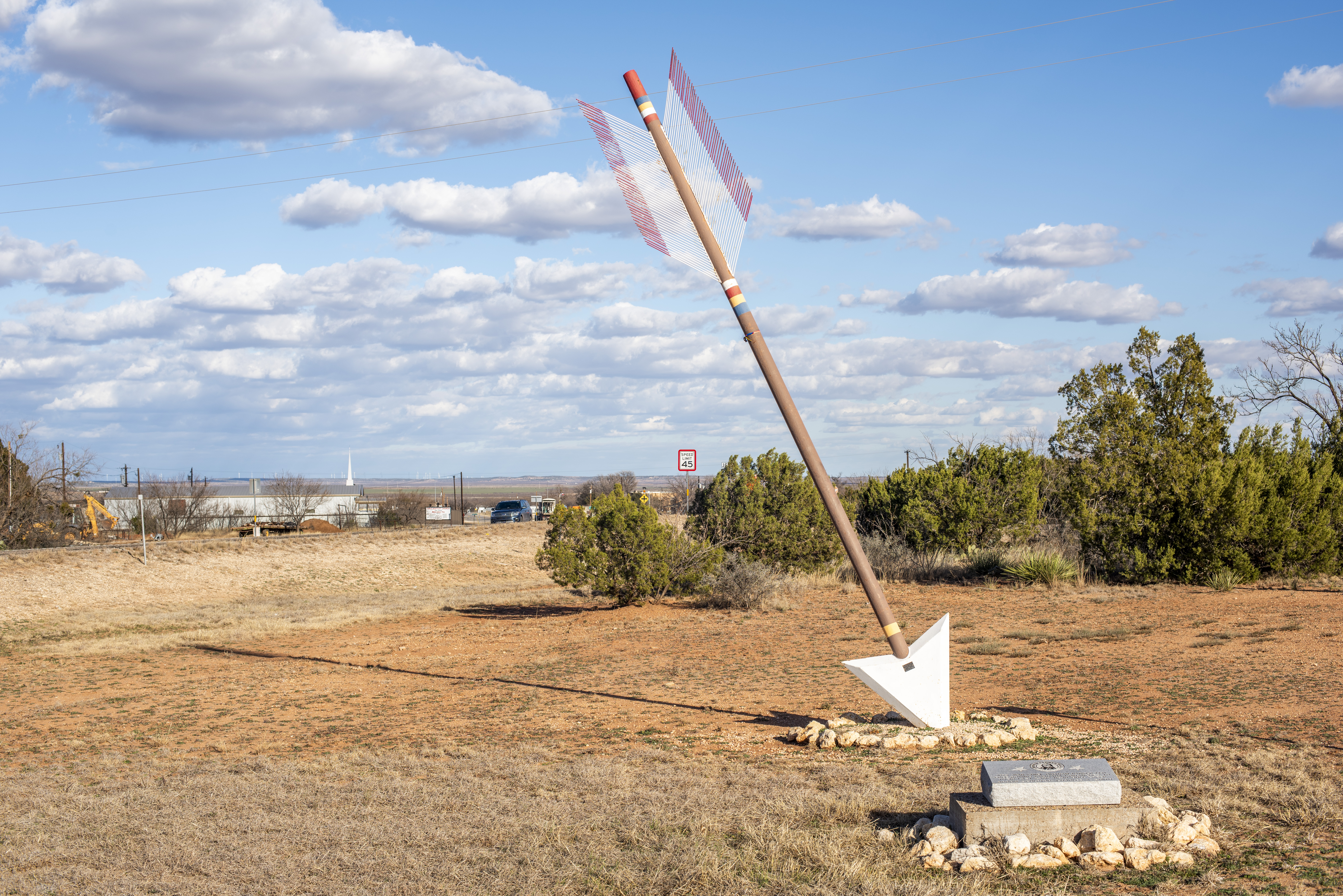
Quanah Parker Trail arrow

Throughout the years, the board of the Texas Plains Trail has been composed of members from throughout the region, and bi-monthly or quarterly board meetings have been consistently held in communities that represent the various parts of the trail. The organization held yearly Texas Plains Trail Roundup events starting in 2009 with the inaugural event happening in Plainview on August 11, 2009. In 2010, the group coordinated with the United States Postal Service and counties in the region to sponsor Special Pictorial Stamp Cancellations for each week of the year. Individuals could obtain each county's cancellation by either visiting post offices in designated cities or mailing requests to post masters possessing the cancellation stamps.

=== Quanah Parker Trail ===
Later in 2010, an initiative to honor Quanah Parker and the Comanche people named the Quanah Parker Trail was formed by citizen historians that were loosely affiliated with the Texas Plains Trail organization. The first planning meeting was held on October 26, 2010, in Quanah, Texas, a city on the eastern edge of Texas Plains Trail region. This event was attended by representatives from 50 counties in the region along with dignitaries from the Comanche Nation. To commemorate the Quanah Parker Trail, the steering committee of the trail researched Comanche associations with each county so that general locations could be marked. Charles Smith of New Home, Texas volunteered to construct large, 20-plus feet long, steel arrows painted with traditional Comanche colors to implant into the ground near highways and other points of interest. The first arrow was installed in Matador, Texas on August 11, 2011, with 16 additional arrows being installed by the end of 2011. Following each arrow installation, dedication ceremonies were conducted either when the arrow was installed or at a later date. To date, more than 80 arrows have been installed in the majority of counties in the Texas Plains Trail region. Most of the arrows have granite markers with short text details describing why the arrows have been placed.

== State Historic Sites ==
Charles and Mary Ann Goodnight Ranch State Historic Site

Slaton Harvey House
