= Gethsemane Lutheran Church =

Historic structure in Austin, Texas

- Gethsemane Lutheran Church and Luther Hall
- U.S. National Register of Historic Places
- Recorded Texas Historic Landmark
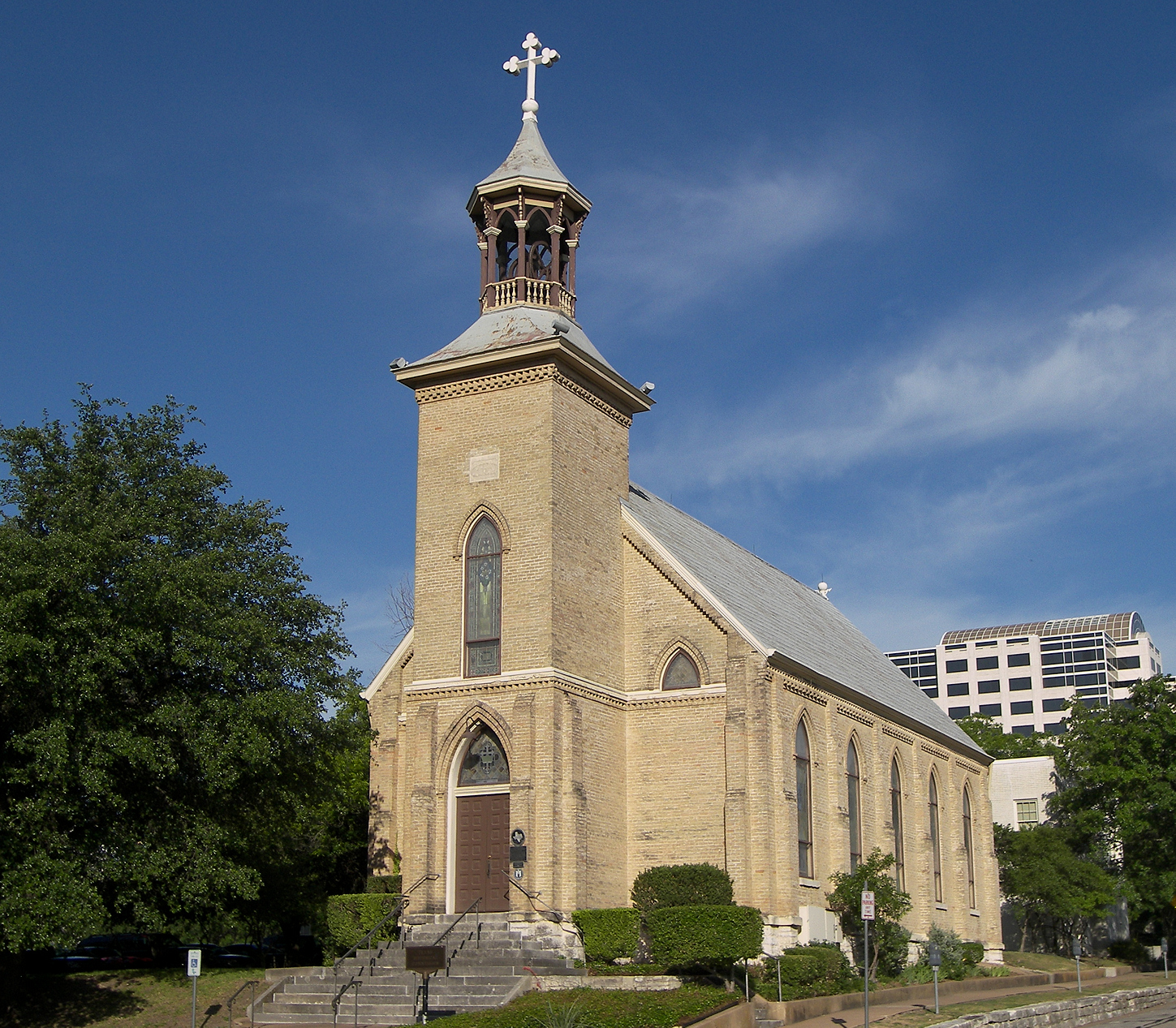

- Location within Texas Location within the United States
- Location: 1510 Congress Ave., Austin, Texas
- Coordinates: 30°16′40″N 97°44′22″W
- Area: 0.2 acres (0.081 ha)
- Built: 1882
- Built by: Fredric Reichow, S. A. Carlson
- Architect: August Swenson
- Architectural style: Gothic Revival
- NRHP reference No.: 70000766 (original); 04001398 (increase)
- RTHL No.: 14770

Significant dates
- Added to NRHP: August 25, 1970
- Boundary increase: December 23, 2004
- Designated RTHL: 1962

Gethsemane Lutheran Church is a historic Lutheran church in downtown Austin, Texas. It is designated as a Recorded Texas Historic Landmark and is listed on the National Register of Historic Places along with the neighboring Luther Hall. The building currently houses the offices of the Texas Historical Commission.

== History ==
The first Swedish Lutheran Church in Austin began meeting in 1868. In late 1882, the Swedish Lutherans decided to build a new meeting place near the Texas State Capitol grounds. Construction was completed the following year, and the congregation occupied the building. A second structure, named Luther Hall, was built adjacent to the main building in 1940 to provide additional meeting and activity space. The congregation relocated to a new space in 1961, after which the facility was purchased by the State of Texas and became part of the State Capitol Complex.

After the Lutheran congregation left the church in 1961, community members began advocating for the historical preservation of the structure. The church was designated a Recorded Texas Historic Landmark in 1962, and the sanctuary was added to the National Register of Historic Places on August 25, 1970. The NRHP listing was later expanded to include neighboring Luther Hall on December 23, 2004.

The facility was renovated and restored between 1970 and 1971 to serve as office, library, and museum space for the Texas Historical Commission. It operates alongside the nearby Carrington–Covert House. Since 1998, the sanctuary has housed the THC's library, while Luther Hall provides office space for the commission's History Programs Division.

== Architecture ==
The Gethsemane Lutheran Church sanctuary building is a rectangular two-story hall constructed of tan brick atop a limestone foundation and basement, with a gray pressed tin roof. It features a square bell tower and steeple that rises an additional story from the center front. Designed in the Gothic Revival style, the building includes brick buttresses, cornices, and tall lancet windows with brick hood moulds. The church was designed by architect August Swenson and built by Fredric Reichow, with S. A. Carlson serving as contractor.

The sanctuary building has a rectangular plan oriented east-to-west, with the main facade and tower on the east and an apse on the west. The main entrance, located at the base of the projecting steeple, features a Gothic arch with a stained-glass transom window above paneled wood double doors. The second level of the tower features a stained-glass lancet window and is topped by a cornice. Above the cornice, a hipped roof narrows the tower into an octagonal Carpenter Gothic cupola and belfry, which is topped by a conical roof with a cross-shaped finial.

The north and south faces of the building each display five parallel stained-glass lancet windows separated by brick buttresses. The entrance arch and all the windows include brick hood moulds. The exterior bricks of the building were salvaged from the ruins of the second (1852) Texas State Capitol, which burned in 1881. Additionally, the main doors were salvaged from the University of Texas at Austin's Old Main building when it was demolished in the 1930s to make way for the current Main Building.

=== Luther Hall ===
Luther Hall is a two-story rectangular building constructed of brick and limestone on a concrete foundation, situated immediately to the west of the sanctuary. The hall was designed in a Modern Movement style, characterized by its simple, symmetrical lines. The main facade features a recessed entry with double doors and a transom (similar to the sanctuary's main entry), beneath a stepped parapet adorned with a medallion representing the coat of arms of Martin Luther.

== See also ==
- National Register of Historic Places listings in Travis County, Texas
- Recorded Texas Historic Landmarks in Travis County
