= Carrington–Covert House =

Historic house in Texas, United States

- Carrington-Covert House
- U.S. National Register of Historic Places
- Recorded Texas Historic Landmark
- Texas State Antiquities Landmark
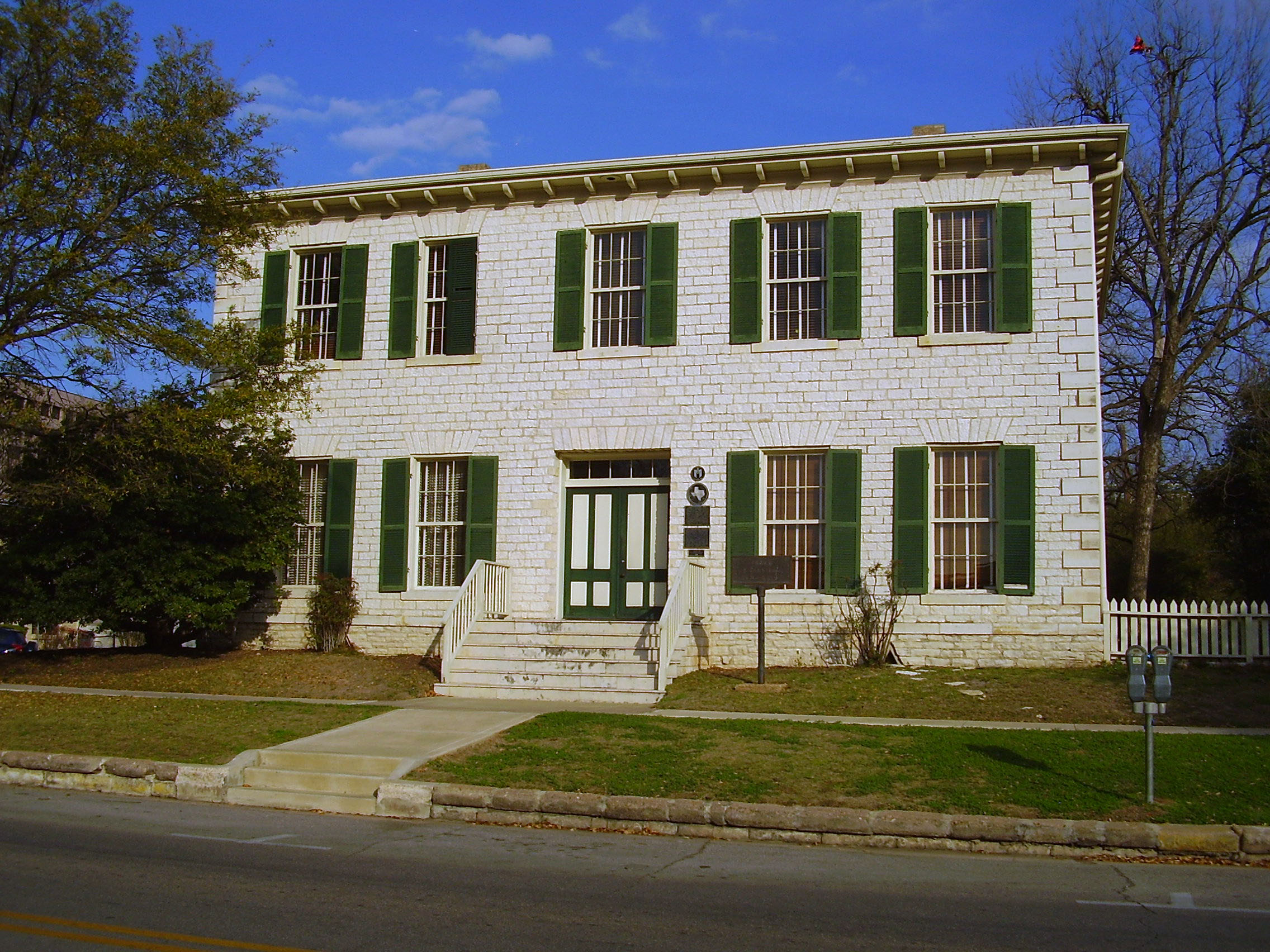
- Carrington–Covert House
- Location: Austin, Texas, US
- Coordinates: 30°16′40″N 97°44′24″W
- Built: 1857
- NRHP reference No.: 70000765
- RTHL No.: 6423
- TSAL No.: 737

Significant dates
- Added to NRHP: August 25, 1970
- Designated RTHL: 1972
- Designated TSAL: 8/18/2000

The Carrington–Covert House is a historic building in downtown Austin, Texas that serves as headquarters of the Texas Historical Commission. Built between 1855 and 1857, it is one of the few surviving pre-Civil War structures in the city.

It was added to the National Register of Historic Places in 1970. The Carrington–Covert House was turned over to the Texas Historical Commission to serve as the agency's headquarters in 1971, together with the nearby Gethsemane Lutheran Church.

== History ==
Construction began in 1855 and was essentially complete when on July 7, 1857, the building contractor, John Brandon, settled his account with the owner, Leonidas Carrington. This was fewer than 20 years after Austin was founded.

The building has served many purposes. From 1857 to 1870 it was the residence of Leonidas D. Carrington, his wife Martha née Hickman Hill, and their five children. M.L. Hemphill bought the property in May 1870, and died five years later; apparently, his family continued living there until 1881. John Fields bought the house in 1881, but whether he ever resided there is not known.

Fields rented the house in 1893 to a charity sponsored by an Austin women's group, and from that time until 1898, it served as the "Texas Eye, Ear, and Throat Hospital". The clinic operated "on the principle that two-thirds of its patients should be charity cases and the other third paying patients who contributed the funds for keeping the clinic in operation". From 1903 to 1936, the house was the residence of the Covert family, who opened the first car dealership in central Texas in 1909; in 2020 the dealership was still in business in Austin.

== Texas Historical Commission marker text ==
Leonidas D. Carrington (1816–1897) and his wife, Martha Hill Carrington (1824–1859) came to Austin from Mississippi in 1852. He began to accumulate real estate, and on Sept. 15, 1853, bought this block from James M. W. Hall, Austin hotelman, and ten days later opened a mercantile store on Congress Avenue intersection with Pecan Street (now 6th Street). In 1856, Carrington hired John Brandon, a local architect-contractor, to build on this site a vernacular Greek Revival home, constructed of rough limestone ashlar. The house was completed in the spring of 1857. The property was purchased by M. L. Hemphill in 1870 and by the John Fields family in 1881. Fields leased the building, 1893–1898, to the "Texas Eyes, Ear, and Throat Hospital," directed by Dr. Henry L. Hilgartner (1868–1937), and in 1903, sold this site to Frank M. Covert (1865–1938), the head of a prominent Austin family, who lived here until 1936. Subsequent owners rented the structure as a boarding house, residence, and nursery until it was purchased by the State of Texas in 1968. The Texas Historical Commission (THC) restored the house in 1972 after an archeological excavation by the Texas State Archeologist's Office, an adjunct of the THC. Recorded as a Texas Historic Landmark-1962

== Gallery ==
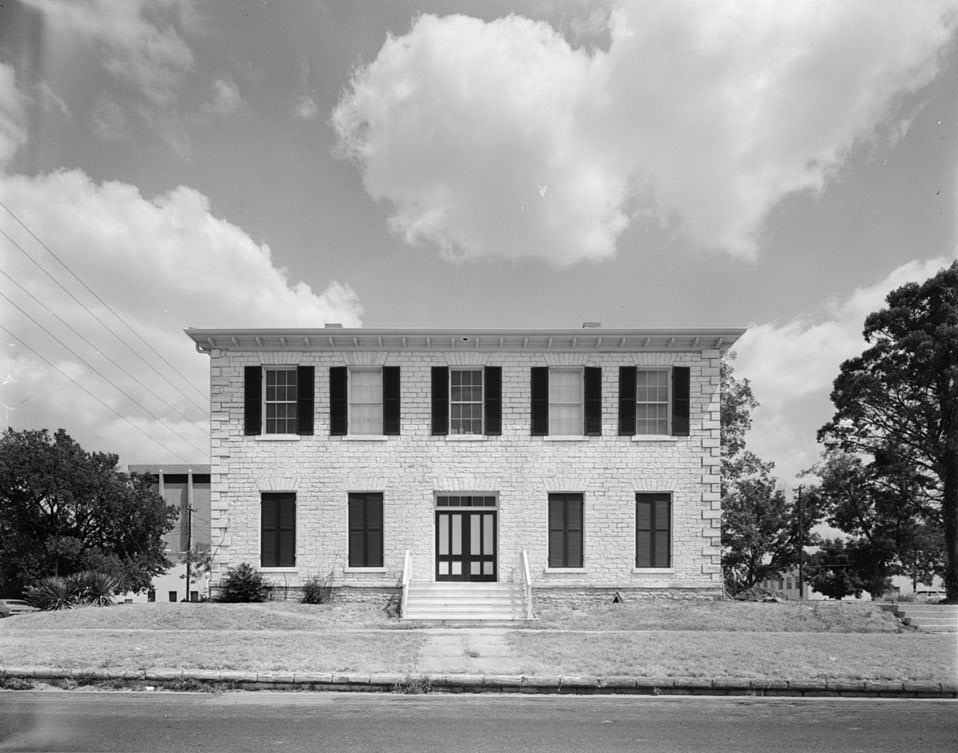
Carrington–Covert House, façade (west elevation), photo July 1974, by Roy Pledger for Historic American Buildings Survey
