= Texas Lakes Trail =

American non-profit organization

- Founder: Texas Historical Commission
- Purpose: Tourism, Economic Development and Historical Preservation
- Location: Granbury, Texas
- Website: www.texaslakestrail.com

The Texas Lakes Trail is a non-profit organization which promotes heritage tourism, economic development, and historic preservation. It is one of ten regions which make up the Texas Heritage Trails Program of the Texas Historical Commission.

== History ==
In 1968 Texas hosted the World's fair, known as HemisFair '68, in San Antonio. In connection with this boost in international attention, the Texas Department of Transportation designated ten 650-mile circular driving regions that encompassed the entire state.

These trails received little notice after their creation, until in the late 1990s when the Texas Historical Commission adopted these trails as their Heritage Trail Program.

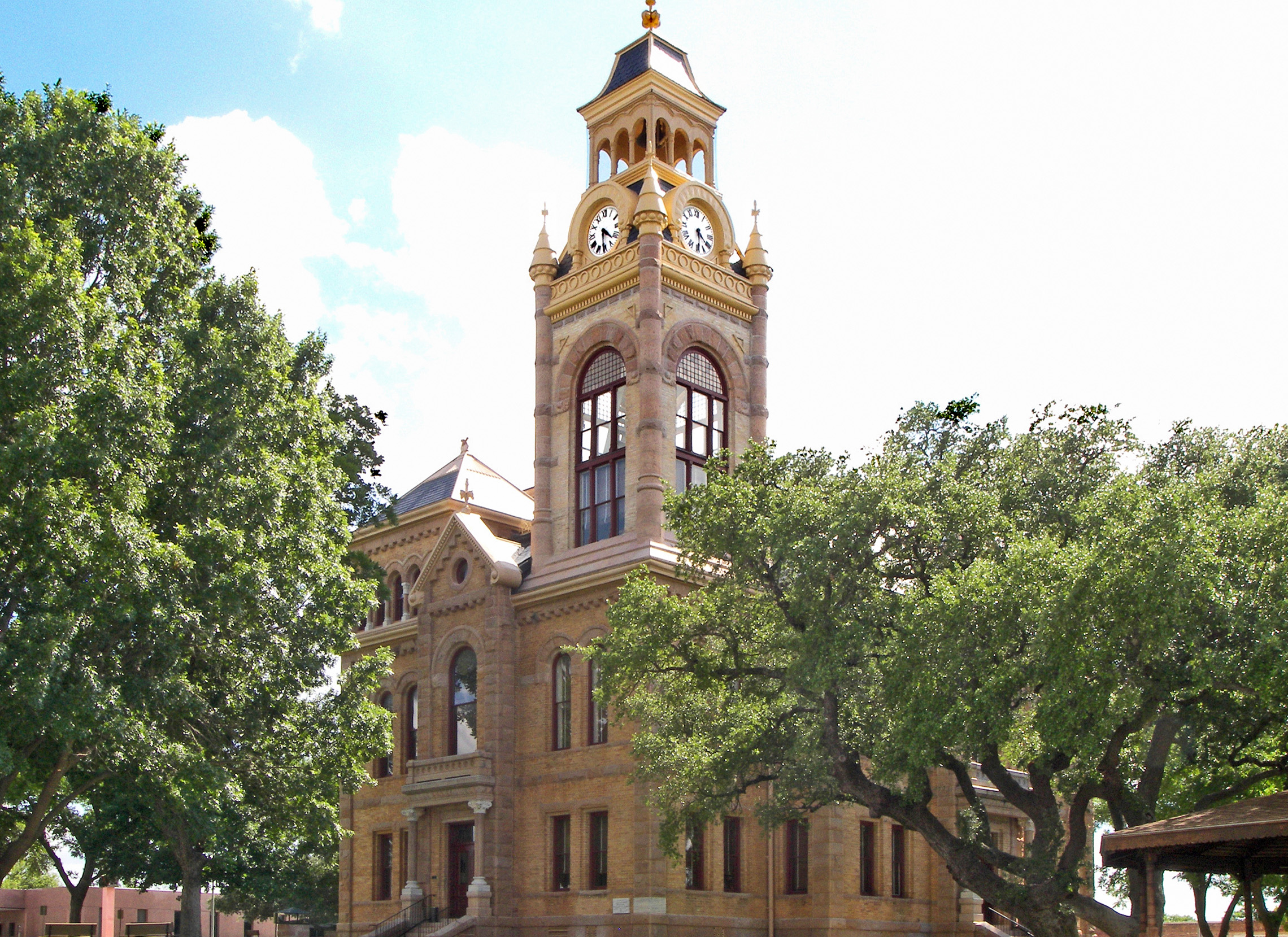
Llano County Courthouse

== See also ==
- Texas Heritage Trails Program
