= Fort Chadbourne =

- U.S. National Register of Historic Places
- U.S. Historic district
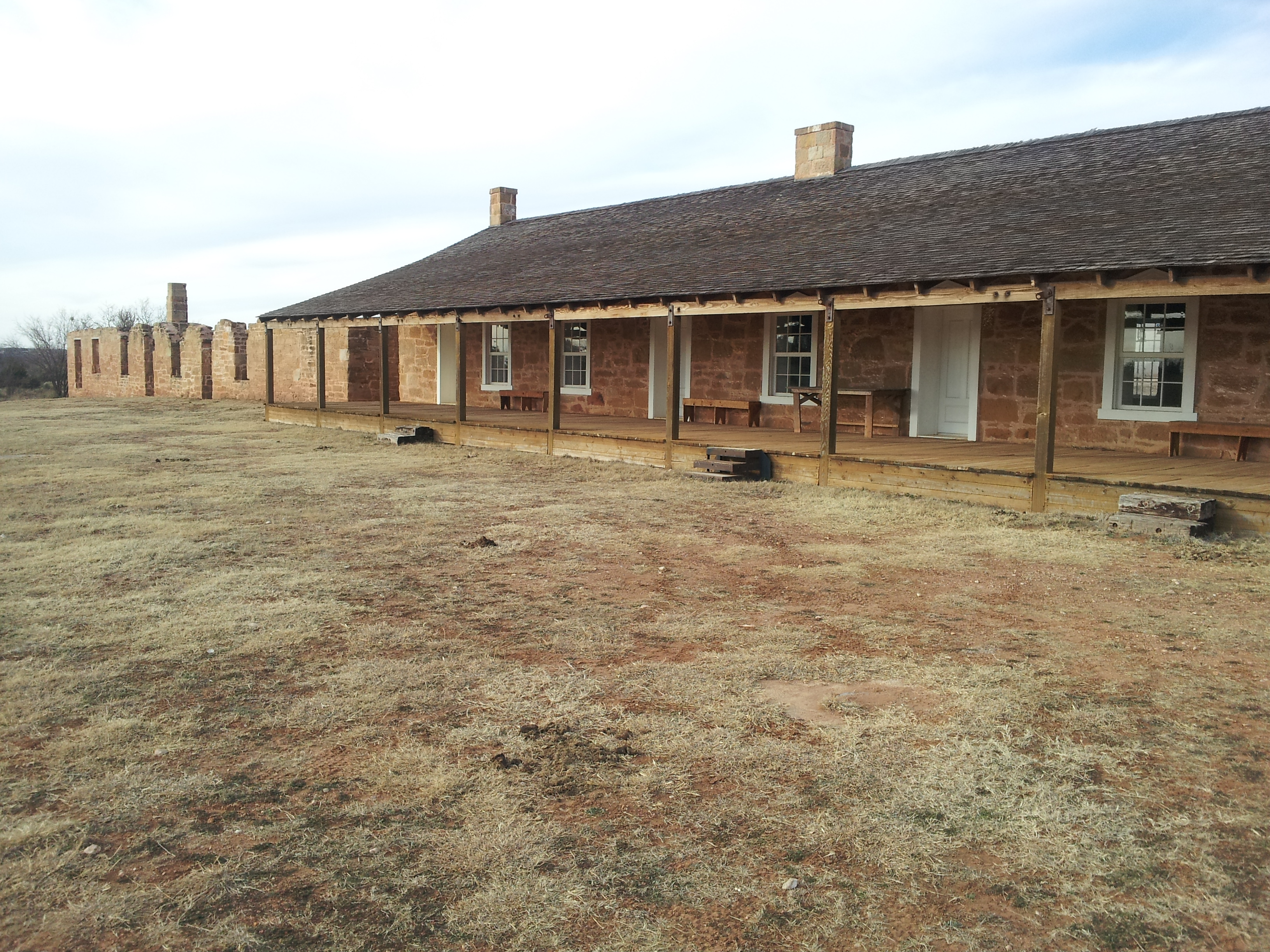
- Fort Chadbourne barracks

- Location within Texas Location within the United States
- Nearest city: Bronte, Texas
- Coordinates: 32°2′4″N 100°14′41″W
- Area: 22.5 acres (9.1 ha)
- Built: 1852
- NRHP reference No.: 73001962
- Added to NRHP: April 2, 1973

Fort Chadbourne was a fort established by the United States Army on October 28, 1852, in what is now Coke County, Texas, to protect the western frontier and the Butterfield Overland Mail route. It was named after Lt. T.L. Chadbourne, who was killed in the Battle of Resaca de la Palma. It was defended by Companies A and K of the 8th U.S. Infantry. During the early days of the American Civil War, the fort surrendered to the Confederates on February 28, 1861, even before the Confederate shelling of Fort Sumter, South Carolina, but was reoccupied by federal troops from 1865 to 1867.

Other forts in the frontier fort system were Forts Griffin, Concho, Belknap, Richardson, Stockton, Davis, Bliss, Mason, McKavett, Clark, McIntosh, Inge, Lancaster, and Phantom Hill in Texas, and Fort Sill in Oklahoma. "Subposts or intermediate stations" also were used, including Bothwick's Station on Salt Creek between Fort Richardson and Fort Belknap, Camp Wichita near Buffalo Springs between Fort Richardson and Red River Station, and Mountain Pass between Fort Concho and Fort Griffin.

== Major Neighbors ==
Robert Neighbors met with the southern band of Comanches and their chiefs Sanaco, Buffalo Hump, Ketsume, and Yellow Wolf near the fort over 10 days starting on 24 August 1853. "All topics of interest to the Comanches were discussed". Neighbors communicated with Seth Eastman, while Seth was a captain at the fort in 1856 and was responsible for the Brazos Indian Reservation, about Comanche depredations in the area.

== Preservation ==
Fort Chadbourne, a Texas state historical site, was also added in 1973 to the National Register of Historic Places (#73001962). The small community of Fort Chadbourne, Texas, is located a few miles to the southwest of the original fort.

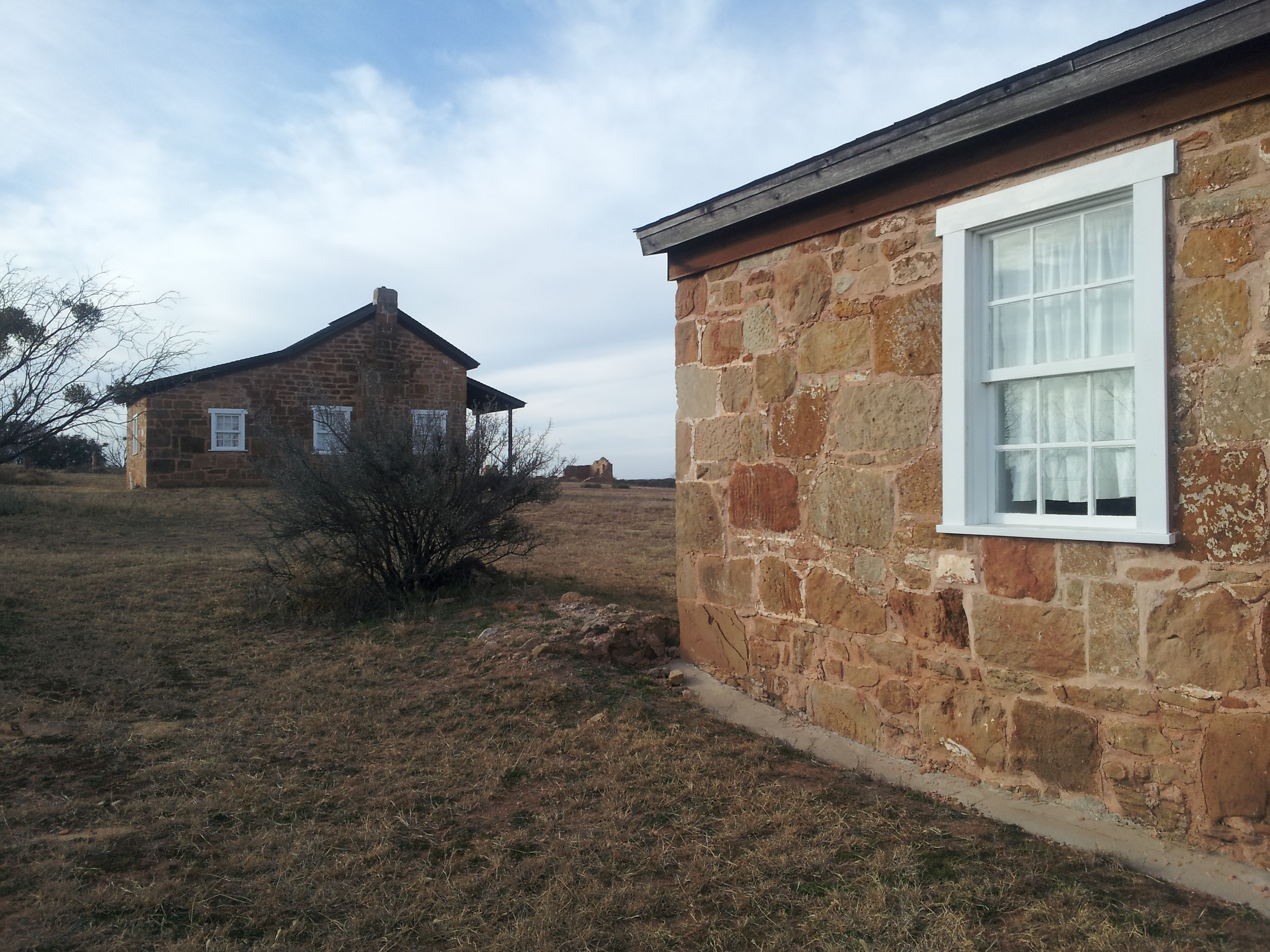
Fort Chadbourne officer's quarters

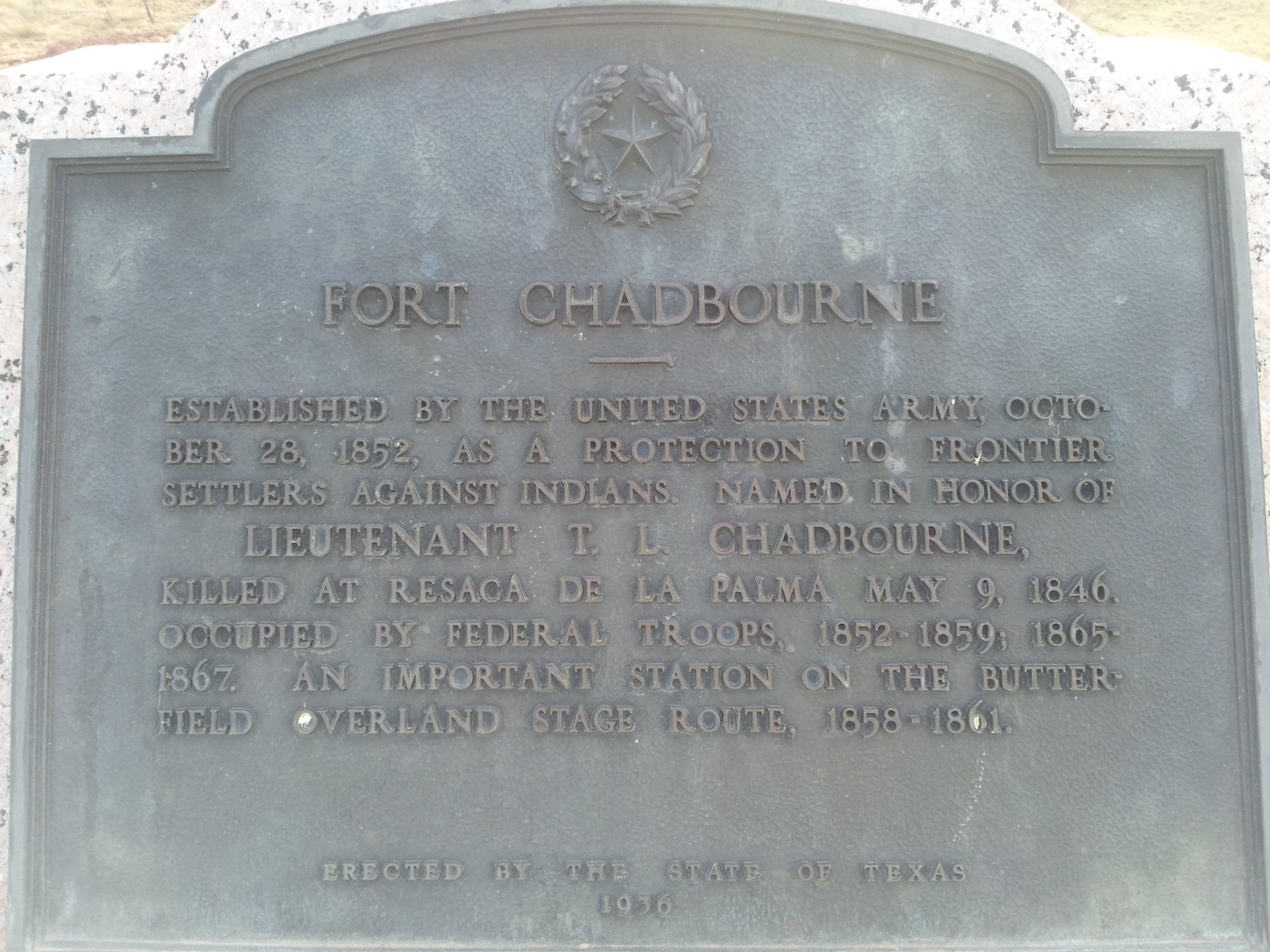
Fort Chadbourne Texas Historical Marker

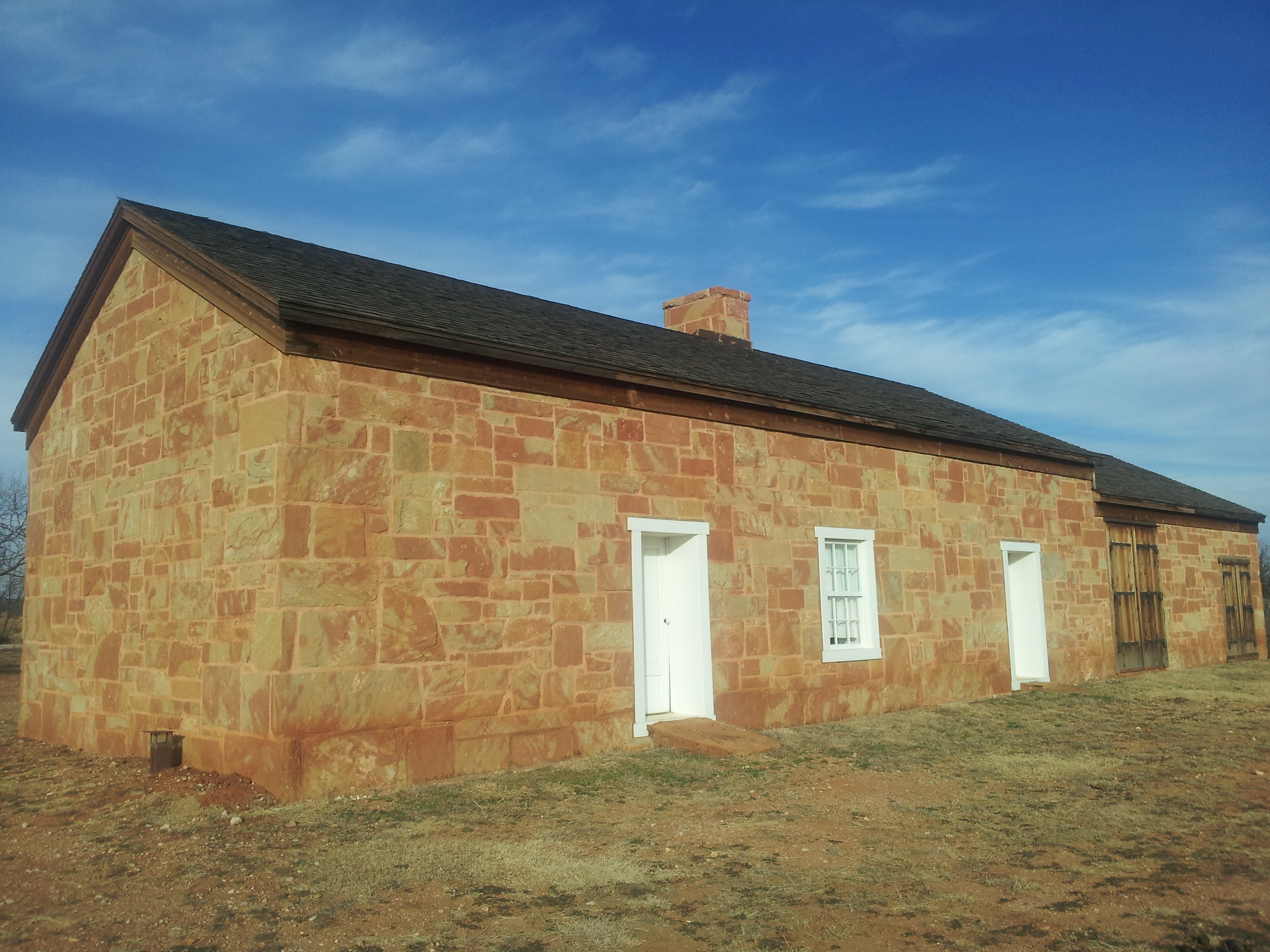
Fort Chadbourne reconstructed stage station

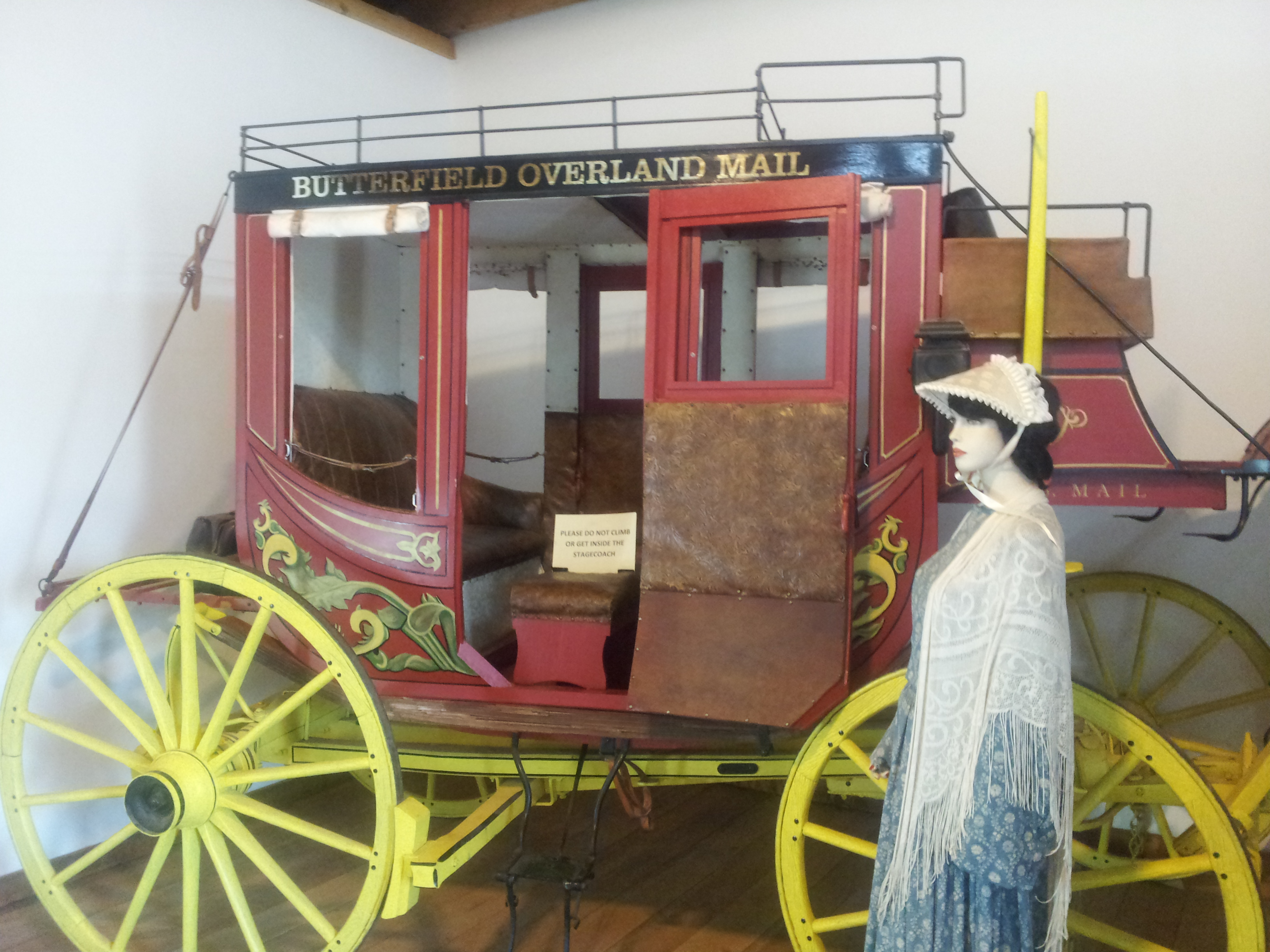
Fort Chadbourne museum

== See also ==
- Texas Forts Trail
- Forts of Texas
