= Texas Forts Trail =

- Founded: 1998
- Founder: Texas Historical Commission
- Purpose: Tourism, Economic Development and Historical Preservation
- Location: Abilene, Texas
- Website: www.texasfortstrail.com

The Texas Forts Trail is a nonprofit organization chartered in 1999 which promotes heritage tourism, economic development, and historic preservation. It is one of 10 driving trail regions which make up the award-winning Texas Heritage Trails Program of the Texas Historical Commission. The driving trail is 650 miles (1,050 km) long.

== History ==
In 1968, Texas hosted the World's Fair, known as HemisFair '68, in San Antonio, Texas. In connection with this boost in international attention, the Texas Department of Transportation designated ten 650-mile (1,050 km) circular driving regions that encompassed the entire state of Texas. These trails saw little attention after their creation until in the late 1990s when the Texas Historical Commission adopted these trails as their Heritage Trail Program. The Texas Forts Trail was the first of the 10 trails to be reinstated.

== Regional Heritage ==
The 29-county Forts Trail Region historically is known for people such as Robert E. Lee, John Butterfield, Buffalo Hump, Wyatt Earp, Doc Holliday, and Conrad Hilton. Famous movies such as Lonesome Dove and Old Yeller were based in this region. The region is named for the eight forts and Spanish presidio, some of the best preserved Civil War-era frontier military posts in Texas.

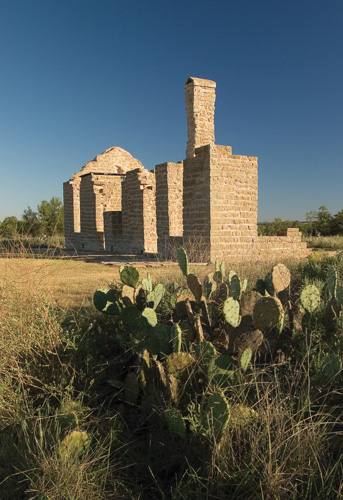
Fort Griffin State Historic Site

== Fort locations ==
- Presidio de San Saba
- Fort Belknap
- Fort Phantom Hill
- Fort Chadbourne
- Fort Mason
- Fort McKavett
- Fort Richardson
- Fort Griffin
- Fort Concho
