= Texas Historical Commission =

Agency of the State of Texas, United States

- Seal

- Logo

Agency overview
- Formed: 1953
- Headquarters: Austin, Texas, United States
- Employees: 175
- Website: thc.texas.gov

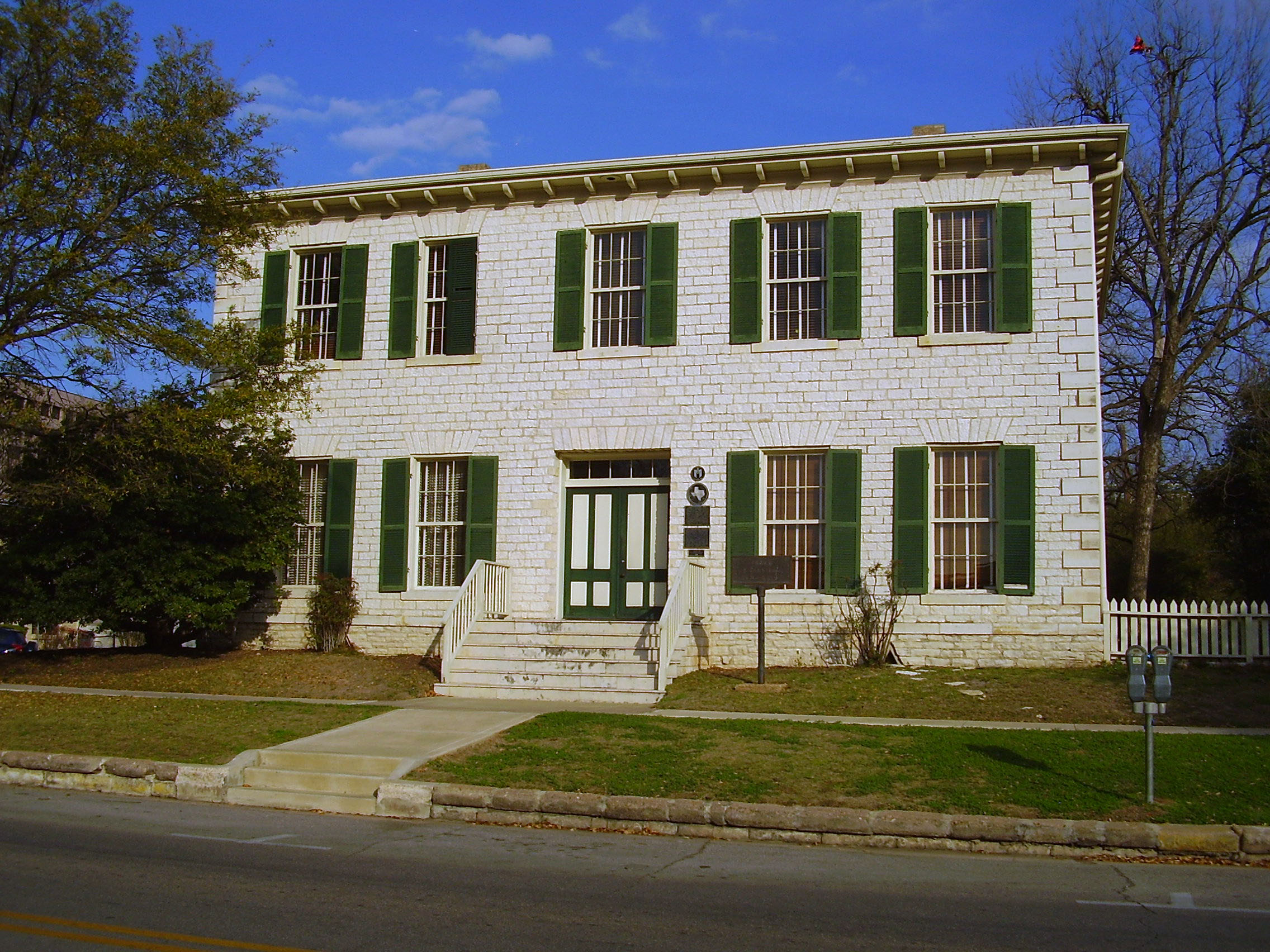
Carrington-Covert House

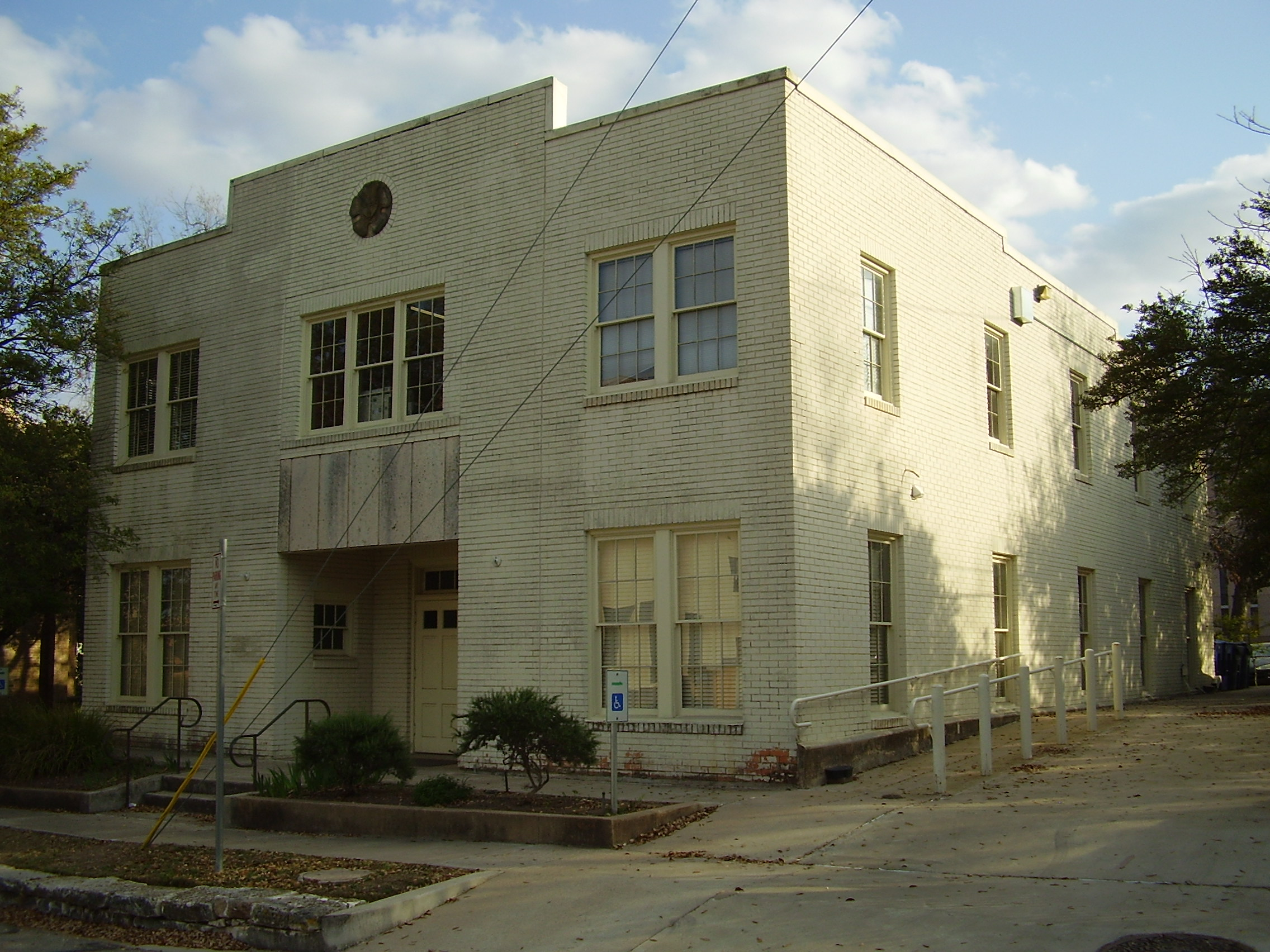
Luther Hall

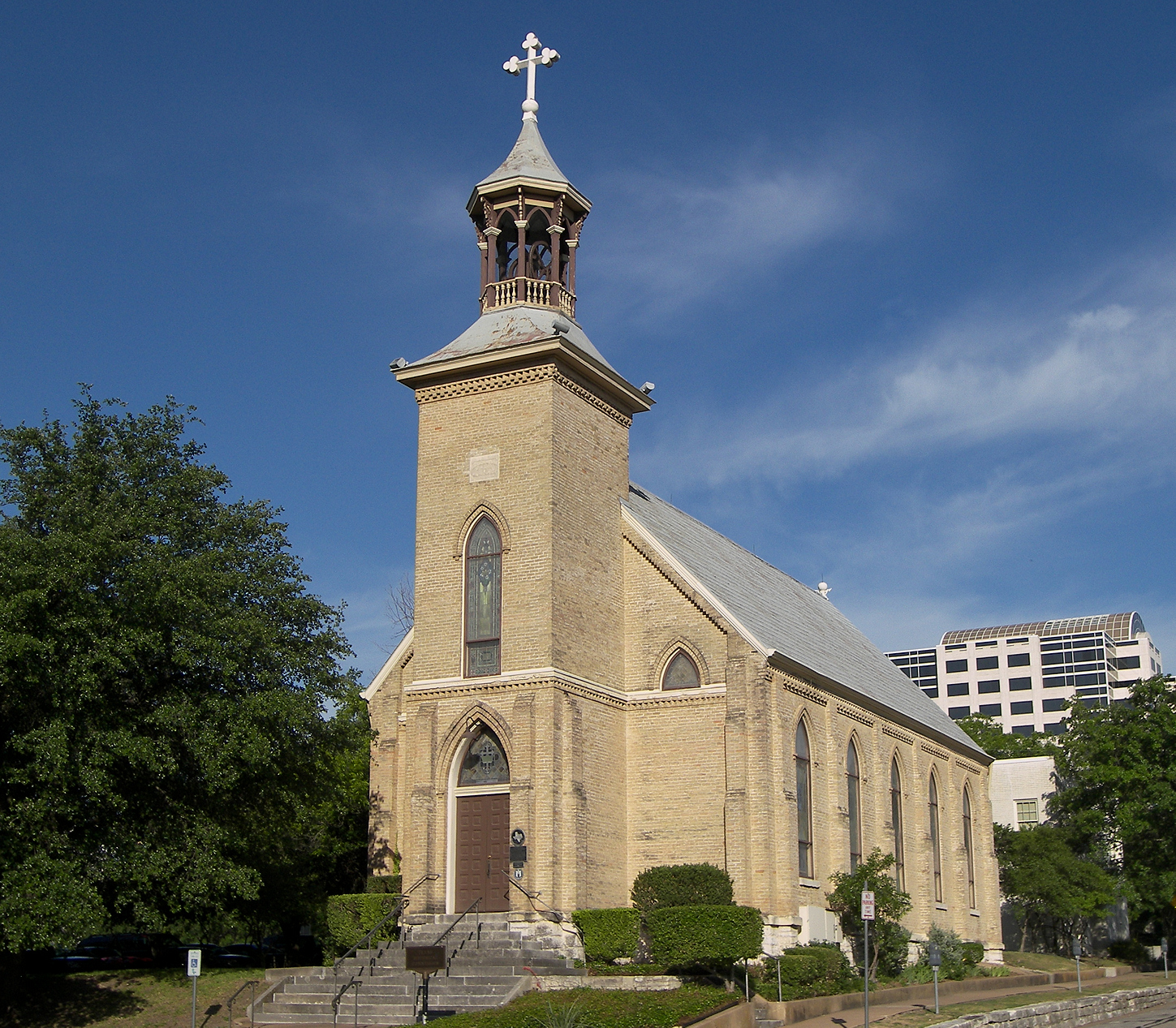
Gethsemane Lutheran Church

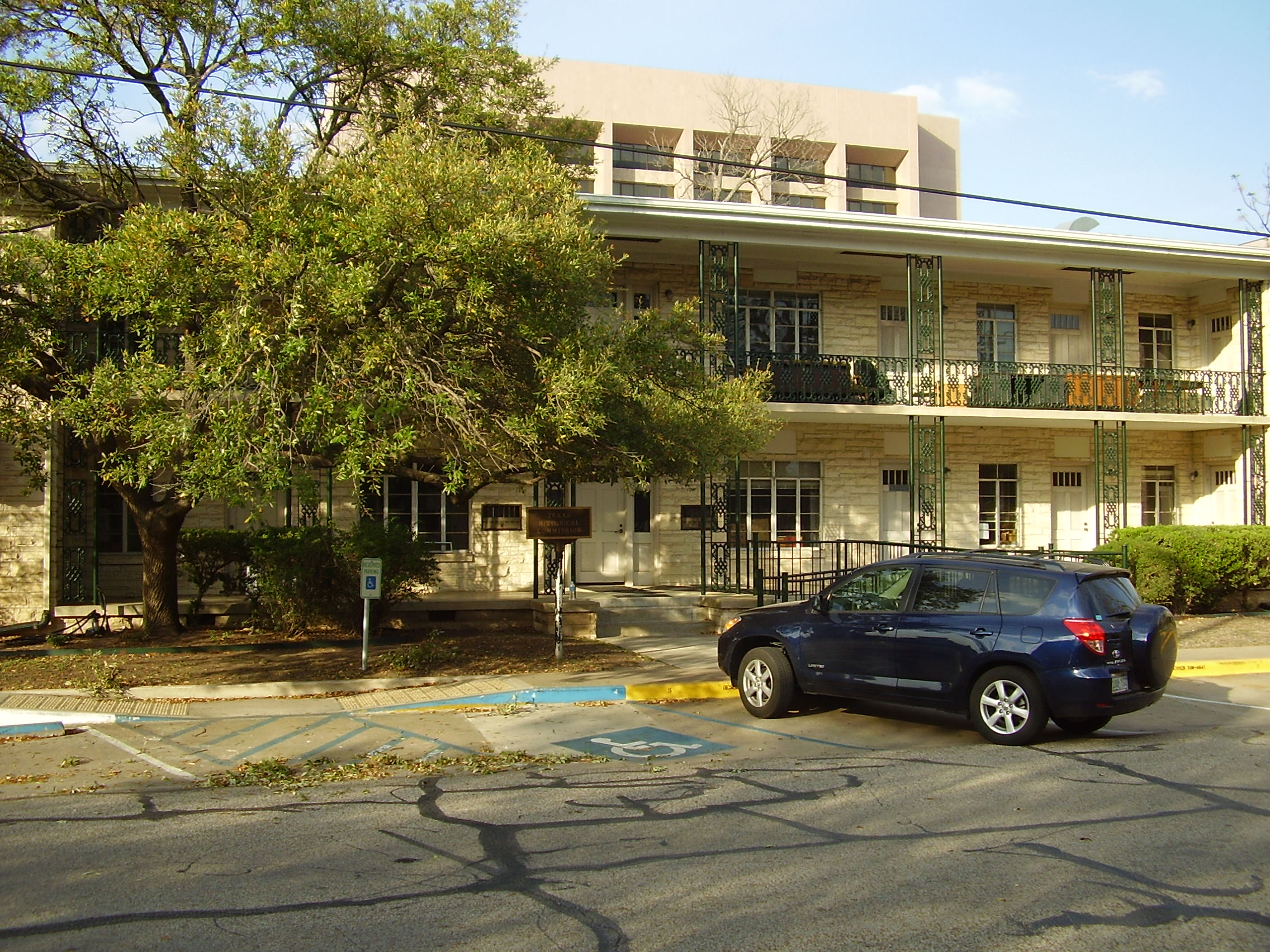
Elrose Building

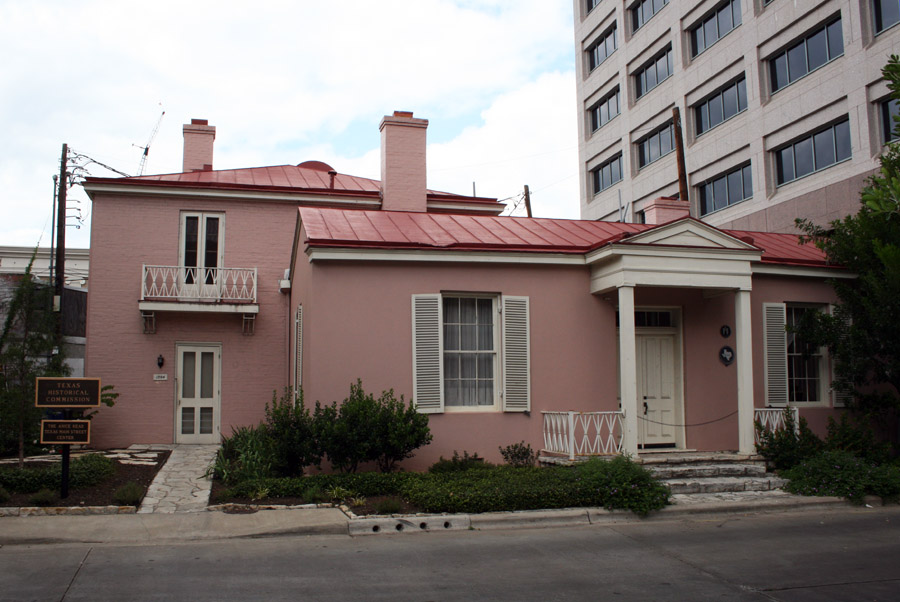
Christianson-Leberman Building

The Texas Historical Commission is an agency dedicated to historic preservation within the U.S. state of Texas. It administers the National Register of Historic Places for sites in Texas.

The commission also identifies Recorded Texas Historic Landmarks (RTHL) and recognizes them with Official Texas Historical Marker (OTHM) medallions and descriptive plaques. The commission identifies State Archeological Landmarks and Historic Texas Cemeteries. A quarterly publication, The Medallion, is published by the agency and includes news and advice about preservation projects, Texas' historic sites, and heritage tourism opportunities. The agency also maintains the online Texas Historic Sites Atlas featuring more than 300,000 site records, including data on Official Texas Historical Markers and National Register of Historic Places properties in Texas.

The commission has main offices in the Capitol Complex in downtown Austin; the complex includes the Carrington-Covert House, Luther Hall, Gethsemane Lutheran Church, Elrose Building, and the Christianson-Leberman Building.

== History of the Commission ==
Established in 1953, the state legislature created the Texas State Historical Survey Committee to oversee state historical programs. The legislature revised the agency's enabling statute to give it additional protective powers, expand its leadership role and educational responsibilities, and officially changed its name to the Texas Historical Commission (THC). In 2007, the legislature transferred the management of 20 state historic sites from the Texas Parks and Wildlife Department to the THC.

== Personnel ==
Today, the agency employs about 350 personnel. The Texas Historical Commission leadership is composed of 15 members appointed by the governor with the advice and consent of the senate, serving overlapping six-year terms. All members must be citizens of Texas, and together represent all geographical areas of Texas.

The commission also employs personnel in various fields, including archeology, architecture, economic development, heritage tourism, history, public administration and urban planning. These personnel consult with citizens and organizations to preserve Texas's architectural, archeological and cultural landmarks.

The agency includes the following divisions dedicated to overseeing the agency's programs:

- Administration
- Archeology
- Architecture
- Community Heritage Development
- Historic Sites
- History Programs
- Public Information and Education
- Staff Services

There are several boards associated with the Texas Historical Commission:

- The State Board of Review
- The Antiquities Advisory Board
- The Guardians of Texas Preservation Trust Fund
- The Advisory Board of the Texas Preservation Trust Fund
- The Main Street Interagency Council

== Texas Heritage Trails Program ==
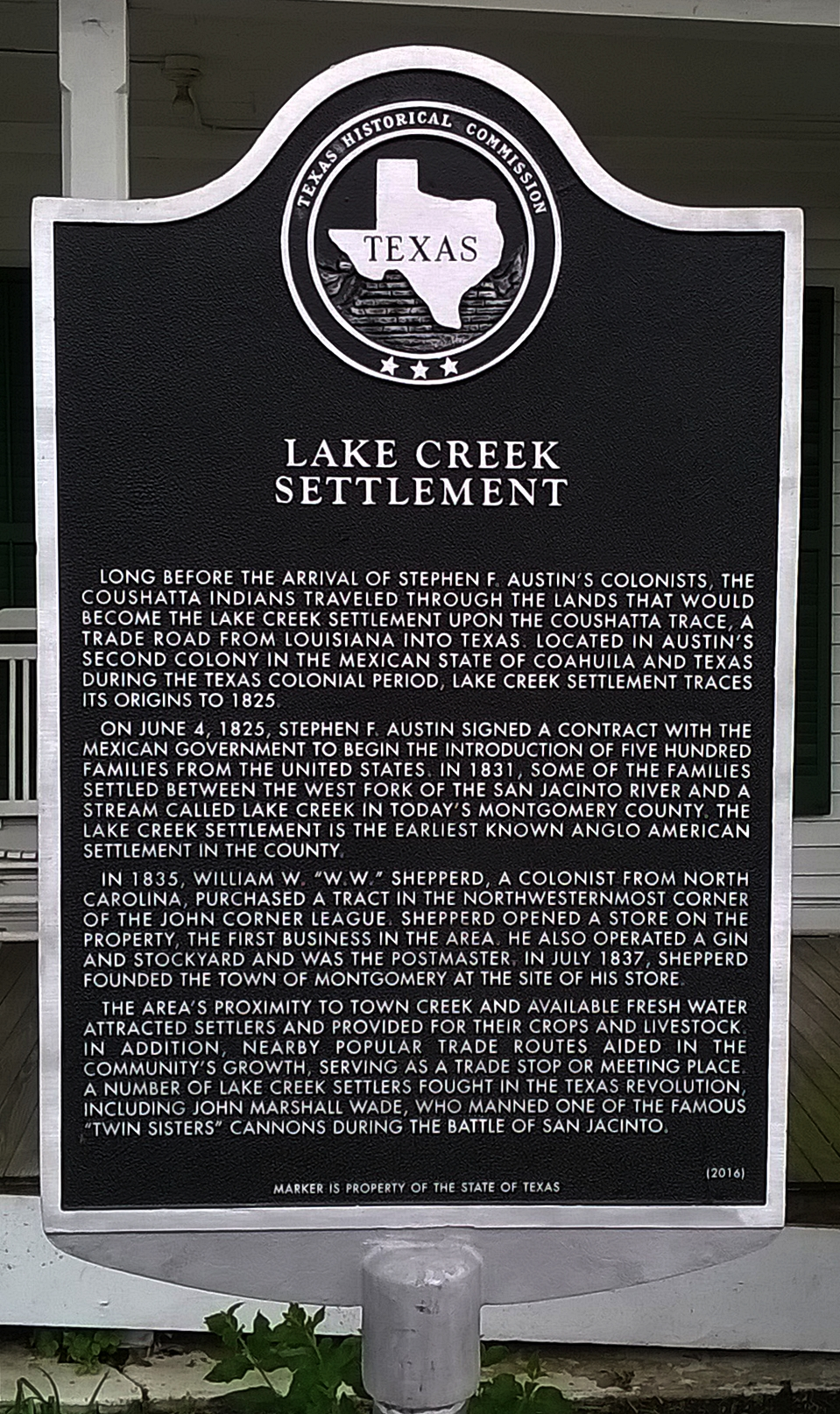
Texas Historical Commission marker approved for the Lake Creek Settlement located in front of the N. H. Davis Museum and Pioneer Complex, 308 Liberty Street, Montgomery, Texas in the Texas Forest Trail region

The Texas Historical Commission administers this statewide heritage tourism program. This program is historically based in the ten scenic driving regions that Texas Department of Transportation and Gov. John Connally designated in 1968 in connection with the World's fair in San Antonio, Texas, called HemisFair '68. After the fair, these trails were all but forgotten. The Texas Historical Commission began its program based on these historical designations in 1998, starting with the Texas Forts Trail. The goal of the program is to promote heritage tourism and historic preservation.

The THC divides Texas into 10 heritage regions:

- Texas Brazos Trail
- Texas Forest Trail
- Texas Forts Trail
- Texas Hill Country Trail
- Texas Independence Trail
- Texas Lakes Trail
- Texas Mountain Trail
- Texas Pecos Trail
- Texas Plains Trail
- Texas Tropical Trail

In 2005, the Heritage Trails Program won the Preserve America Presidential Award for exemplary accomplishment in the preservation and sustainable use of America's heritage assets, which has enhanced community life while honoring the nation's history.

== State Historic Sites ==
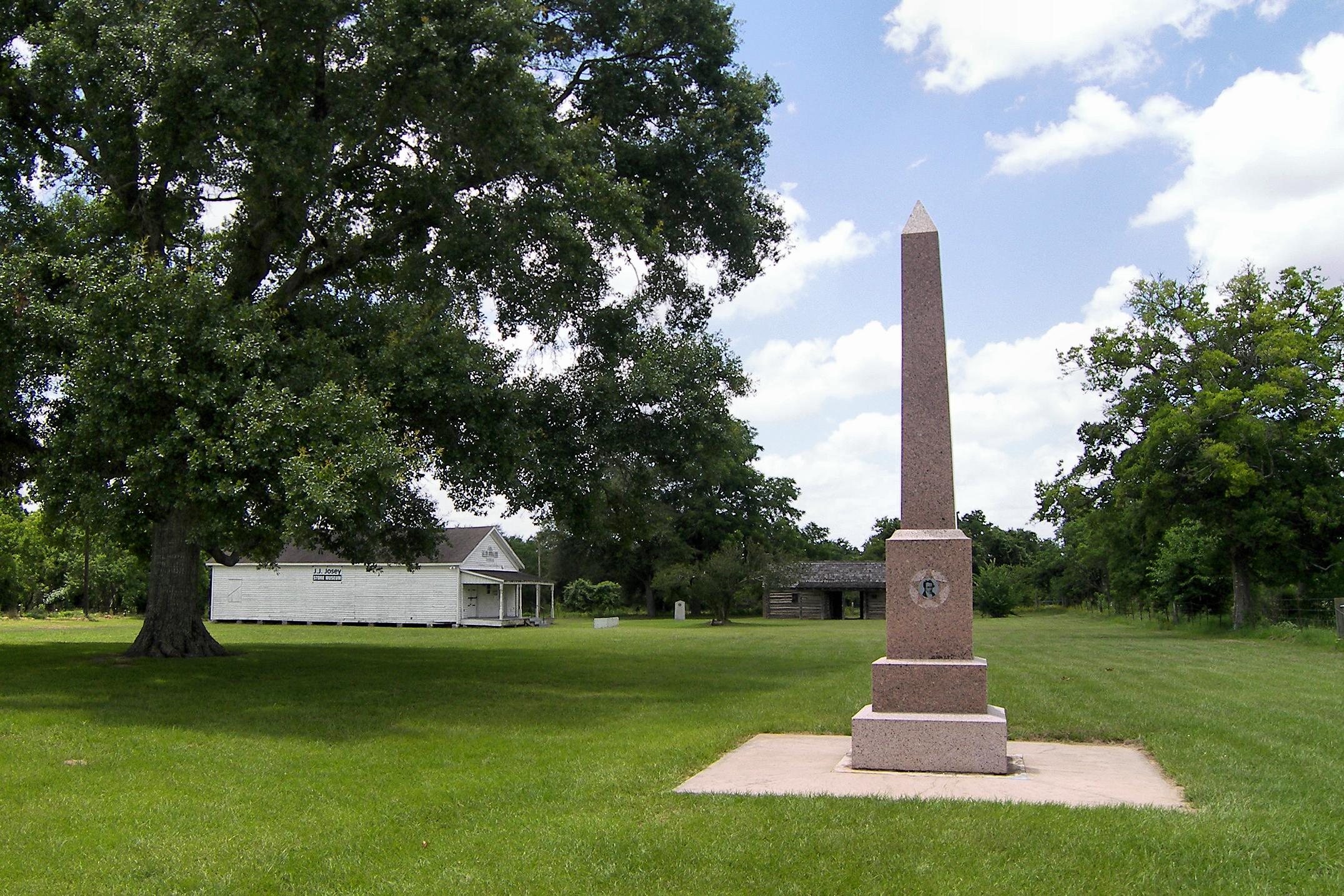
San Felipe de Austin State Historic Site

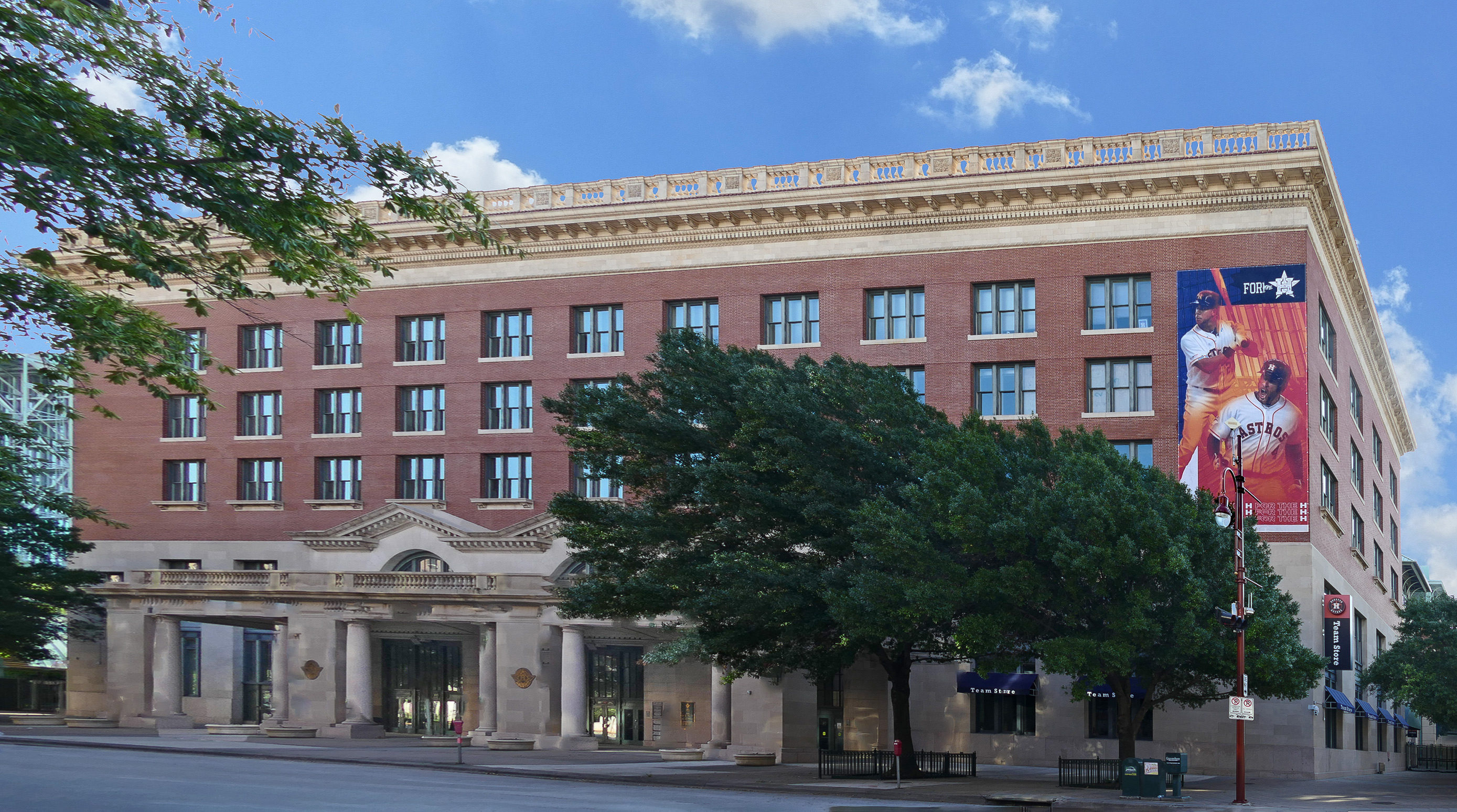
Union Station -- Houston

The Texas Historical Commission preserves and operates 41 state historic sites across Texas. These places honor the past and spark an understanding of what it means to be a Texan. From American Indian sites to frontier forts to common and elegant homes and the leaders and statesmen who lived in them, these sites enrich people's lives through history.

Fort Griffin is home to the official State of Texas Longhorn Herd.

== Historical Markers ==
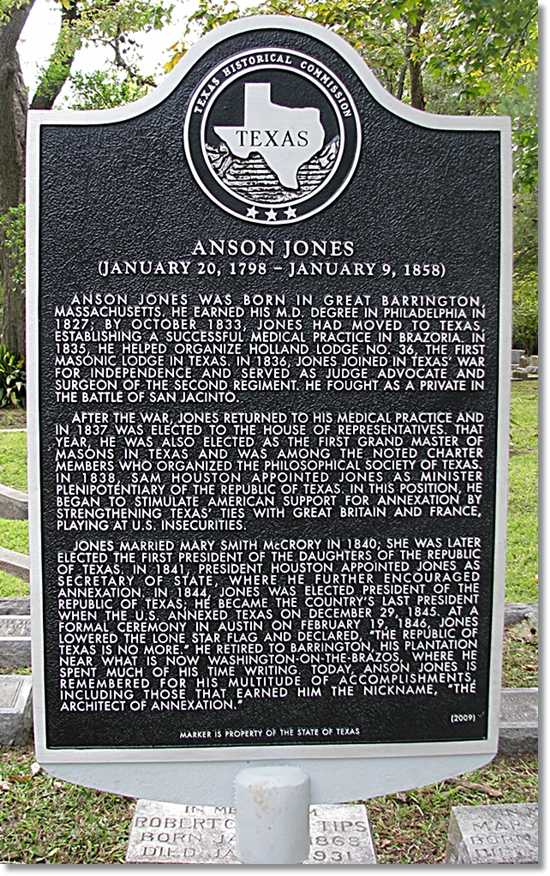
Texas Historical Commission marker located in Glenwood Cemetery (Houston, Texas) commemorating the many important contributions made by Republic of Texas President Anson Jones to the history of Texas

Sponsors may apply for official historical markers through their county historical commissions. The purpose of the markers, which are available in a variety of types (cemetery, building, subject) and sizes, is to educate the public. An application must meet certain requirements to be approved by the THC commissioners as qualifying for a marker.

Beginning in November 2006, the Texas Historical Commission adopted a new marker program. The following are some of the major changes to the program:

- All applications are to be submitted electronically
- There is now an annual application deadline
- An application fee is required
- The inscription process has been reworked

As of 2007, there are over 13,000 Official Texas Historical Markers placed throughout the state. Texas has the most prolific state historical marker program in the United States.

== Recorded Texas Historic Landmark ==
Recorded Texas Historic Landmark is the highest designation given by the Texas Historic Commission for significant structures in Texas.

== State Antiquities Landmark ==
The THC may designate certain locations as State Antiquities Landmarks provided that they are not located on federal lands. These locations may fall into one of two categories:

- Historic buildings which must also be listed on the National Register of Historic Places and which are publicly identified.
- Archeological sites, which may not necessarily have NRHP listing, and whose locations are not available to the general public in order to avoid vandalism.

Designation as a State Antiquities Landmark does not prohibit the destruction or modification of such a structure or location. Instead, the designation requires a permit for any modification subject to public review by the THC.

== Headquarters complex ==
The commission has main offices in the Austin Complex in downtown Austin; the complex includes the Carrington-Covert House at 1511 Colorado Street, Luther Hall, Gethsemane Lutheran Church, Elrose Building, and the Christianson-Leberman Building.

The Carrington-Covert House was turned over to the commission to serve as the agency's headquarters in 1971. Gethsemane Lutheran Church was restored to serve as offices of the agency in 1970 and 1971.

== Friends of the Texas Historical Commission ==
Incorporated in 1996, the Friends of the Texas Historical Commission (FTHC) is a 501c(3) tax exempt nonprofit organization, further designated as a 509(a)(1) and 170(b)(1)(A0(vi) Public Charity, whose purpose is to develop private philanthropic resources to assist the Texas Historical Commission with its mission to identify, preserve, and protect our history—providing a lasting legacy for future generations. FTHC secures contributions to support the programs, projects, and activities of the Texas Historical Commission not provided for in the state budget. Despite its name, the Friends is not a membership organization.

Over the past two decades, FTHC has helped secure more than $10 million to support THC projects and programs, including the 17th century La Belle shipwreck excavation in Matagorda Bay, the Fort St. Louis excavation, the Red River War Battle Sites Project, Texas in the Civil War and World War II Initiatives, the Texas Courthouse Stewardship Program, restoration of the Fulton Mansion, restoration of 23 historic Texas flags, and more.

== See also ==
- Bibliography of the Texas Revolution, Republic, and Annexation
- List of National Historic Landmarks in Texas
- National Register of Historic Places listings in Texas
- T. R. Fehrenbach Award
- List of historical societies in Texas
