= Treaty relating to the utilization of waters of the Colorado and Tijuana Rivers and of the Rio Grande =

Cooperative water agreement between the United States and Mexico

Water deliveries by Mexico in the 2020-2025 cycle: solid red line is the target delivery at a constant rate, red dash line takes into account seasonal flow variability, black line is actual accumulated deliveries

The Treaty on (relating to the) utilization of waters of the Colorado and Tijuana Rivers and of the Rio Grande or the 1944 Water Treaty is a cooperative agreement between the United States and Mexico defining the allocation of Rio Grande water to the U.S. and Colorado River water to Mexico. The agreement was signed in 1944 as an instrument of the two countries' International Boundary and Water Commission (IBWC). The agreement is a subject to frequent changes, delivered through the so-called "Minute Process".

The agreement has been used as a tool for peaceful resolution of transborder water management issues, but some tensions have since arose in the 21st century regarding Mexico's water deliveries to the U.S., which have reportedly become inconsistent and insufficient since the 1990s.

== Agreement and the Commission ==
The agreement defined the composition of the IBWC, including its current name and professional character (both U.S. and Mexican heads are to be engineers). The Commission objectives were set as follows:

- Cross-border redistribution of water of the Colorado River and the Rio Grande
- Joint U.S.–Mexico efforts to regulate and conserve Rio Grande waters by constructing dams and reservoirs
- Regulation of the Colorado River to preserve waters allocated to Mexico
- Flood protection

=== Provisions ===
The annual (per water year) cross-border allocations were defined as follows:

- 350,000 acre-feet (431,550,000 m^{3}) from Mexico (Rio Grande) to the U.S.
- 1,500,000 acre-feet (1,849,500,000 m^{3}) from the U.S. (Colorado River) to Mexico

Drought can be accommodated by lower deliveries that should be made up within the 5-year accounting "cycle" (the concept was updated via Minute 234 in 1969). A declaration of an "extraordinary drought" allows for rolling the 5-year debt into the next 5-year interval. The treaty did not define a procedure for such declaration and does not allow rolling the debt over to yet another 5-year period. Mexico's accumulated water debt is written off once the reservoirs behind Falcon and Amistad Dams become full, with this event starting a new 5-year cycle.

To expedite the negotiations on the primary issue (surface waters), the issue of groundwater was deliberately set aside.

==== Minute system ====
Article 25 of the treaty created a "minute system", a vehicle that allows rapid changes to accommodate water flow variations, environmental conditions, and technical accidents. Each "minute" is a result of negotiations performed by IBWC/CILA Commissioners. The minutes are considered to be interpretations of the treaty, not amendments to it, and therefore do not require action of legislatures to become active: each government has a 30-day window to object, without such an objection, a minute becomes a binding agreement between the countries. Due to the minute system the treaty is considered to be one of the most flexible binational agreements in the world.

Since 2022, the Rio Grande Minute Working Group consists of representatives from IBWC, Texas Commission on Environmental Quality, U.S. Department of State, the Mexican arm of the IBWC (CILA), and the Mexican National Water Commission (CONAGUA).

Minute process can be slow. For example, Minute 242 (the "Permanent and Definitive Solution to the International Problem of the Salinity of the Colorado River") took over a decade to negotiate after the emergence of the salinity crisis.

==== Rio Grande allocations ====
Per the treaty, the countries have the following entitlements:

- Mexico:
  - All waters from the San Juan River and Rio Alamo
  - Half of Rio Grande's main channel flow below the Falcon Dam (the "southernmost international dam" of the treaty)
  - Two-thirds of flows into the main channel from Rio Conchos, Arroyo de las Vacas, Rio San Diego, Rio San Rodrigo, Rio Escondido, Rio Salado
  - Half of all other main channel flow not mentioned above
- U.S.:
  - All water from Alamito Creek, Terlingua Creek, Pecos River, Goodenough Spring, Devils River, San Felipe Creek, Pinto Creek
  - Remaining third from the tributaries where Mexico gets 2/3 as mentioned above
  - Remaining half below the lowest major international storage dam
  - Half of the otherwise unallocated flows between Fort Quitman and the lowest major international storage dam

A special provision ensures that the U.S.'s 1/3 share of the flow from the Mexican tributaries "shall not be less, as an average ... than 350 000 acre-feet (493,200,000 m^{3}) annually".

== Concerns ==
=== Mexico's water debts ===
Since the 1990s, concerns have been raised surrounding Mexico's ability to deliver their promised amounts of water and their frequency of falling behind schedule, placing them in debt regarding water deliveries. Prior to the early 1990s, both the U.S. and Mexico consistently delivered on their obligations, with Mexico frequently delivering more than the promised amounts of water. However, a drought in the 1992–1997 delivery cycle, which was not declared at the time, forced Mexico to reduce deliveries. In 1999, Mexico unilaterally declared a drought and postponed the deliveries into the next cycle, and after a brief protest the U.S. agreed in 2002 to roll over the deficit into a third five-year cycle. The U.S. stated that international obligations have the highest priority on the river, and storing the water in the upstream tributaries for domestic use is not acceptable. By 2004, Mexico had delivered on 75% of its debt.

The 2020–2025 cycle exhibited similar problems, with Mexico delivering just one year's worth of water (400,000 acre-feet (493,200,000 m^{3})) by mid-2024. The previous cycle that ended in October 2020 was also running with a deficit until a last-minute deal—"Minute 325" on October 22, 2020—led to Mexico agreeing to deliver its water, while the U.S. agreed to provide water to communities below the Amistad Dam for domestic and municipal use, but not for agriculture. Minute 325 also envisioned the signing of a deal for the new cycle by December 2023, but Mexico refused to sign the new Minute due to domestic opposition in Chihuahua that led to the Mexican National Guard killing a farmer in a riot in October. In the process of negotiations held in 2020, Texas Governor Greg Abbott asked the U.S. federal government to intervene, citing how the U.S. delivers Mexico four times the amount that Mexico owes to the U.S. annually.

Despite reaching an agreement in November 2024 for Mexico to deliver water more regularly and earlier in the cycle, by early 2025, trends suggested that Mexico would be unable to deliver on its water release obligations, contributing to a severe water crisis in the Texas part of the Lower Rio Grande Valley. To apply pressure, the U.S. government led by the reelected president Donald Trump began withholding USAID and U.S. Trade and Development Agency funding to Mexico. On March 20, 2025, the U.S. refused to deliver water to Mexico for the first time. On April 10, 2025, President Trump, as part of his administration's tariffs, threatened to apply tariffs and sanctions on Mexico if they did not work to deliver the obligated water on time. In response, Mexican President Claudia Sheinbaum stated that Mexico had been complying with the treaty "to the extent water is available", citing a three-year drought.

==== Mexico's rights to keep water in reservoirs ====
The treaty does not specify whether Mexico can keep water in its reservoirs while avoiding deliveries to the U.S. in case of droughts. The treaty language describing extraordinary drought as "making it difficult for Mexico" to deliver the water apparently allows Mexico to avoid the delivery if it cannot satisfy its own water needs, even if there is still some water in its reservoirs; "impossible" would have been used if the intent was to include Mexico delivering water to its own detriment.

=== Reduced flow in the 21st century ===
In the early 21st century, the water flows in the Rio Grande basin have declined considerably. Between 1999 and 2004, the water levels in Armstad and Falcon reservoirs rarely reached even a 30% of capacity. By the 2020s, water levels were found to have declined by around 80% to 95%, the remainder being barely enough to maintain the river as a U.S.–Mexican border line. Mexico had relied on an extraordinary drought provision in every decade since 1990s, essentially turning this exception into an ordinary practice.

=== Colorado River salinity crisis ===
In the 1960s, the levels of salinity in the Colorado River water delivered to Mexico rapidly rose to the point that the water was no longer usable for human consumption or agriculture. This was caused by the filling of Lake Powell and, to a lesser extent, wastewater discharges being made in Arizona. The original U.S. position that Mexico "could not complain about the quality of the water" was softened by Minute 218 (1965, with the U.S. modifying the drainage in Arizona) and, after a threat by Mexico to approach the International Court of Justice regarding the matter, Minute 242 (1973, limiting the average salinity of Colorado water to 145 p.p.m.).

== Sources ==
- Tal, Alon (2007). "International Water Law and Implications for Cooperative Israeli-Palestinian Transboundary Water Management". Integrated Water Resources Management and Security in the Middle East. NATO Science for Peace and Security Series. Dordrecht: Springer Netherlands. pp. 213–236. doi:10.1007/978-1-4020-5986-5_9. ISBN 978-1-4020-5984-1.
- Mumme, Stephen P. (2004). "Developing Treaty Compatible Watershed Management Reforms for the U.S. - Mexico Border: The Case for Strengthening the International Boundary and Water Commission". North Carolina Journal of International Law. 30: 929–955.
- Mumme, Stephen P. (2020). "The 1944 Water Treaty and the Incorporation of Environmental Values in U.S.-Mexico Transboundary Water Governance". Environmental Science & Policy. 112: 126–133. Bibcode:2020ESPol.112..126M. doi:10.1016/j.envsci.2020.05.001.
- Mumme, S.P. (2023). "The Water Treaty of 1944 and the Foundations of Border Water Governance". Border Water: The Politics of U.S.-Mexico Transboundary Water Management, 1945–2015. University of Arizona Press. pp. 27–66. ISBN 978-0-8165-4832-3.
- Mumme, Stephen P.; Tapia-Villaseñor, Elia M. (2023). "U.S.-Mexico Groundwater Diplomacy: Lessons from the Historical Record". Journal of the Southwest. 65 (3): 362–396. doi:10.1353/jsw.2023.a915209. ISSN 2158-1371.
- Paddison, Laura (2024-06-17). "A water war is looming between Mexico and the US. Neither side will win". CNN.
- Pskowski, Martha (2024-06-06). "The other border dispute is over an 80-year-old water treaty". El Paso Times.
- "Governor Abbott Announces Mexico Fulfillment Of Water Delivery Obligations Under 1944 Water Treaty". Office of the Texas Governor. 2020-10-22.
- Buono, Regina M.; Eckstein, Gabriel (2022-08-15). "Current challenges in the Rio Grande/Río Bravo Basin: old disputes in a new century". Water Resources Allocation and Agriculture. IWA Publishing. doi:10.2166/9781789062786_0243. ISBN 978-1-78906-278-6.
- Sanchez, Rosario; Mumme, Stephen P.; Eckstein, Gabriel (2025-03-06). "The extraordinary drought provision and the future of the Rio Grande water deliveries under the 1944 US–Mexico water treaty: an exploratory policy analysis". Water International: 1–18. doi:10.1080/02508060.2025.2465053. ISSN 0250-8060.
- Umoff, Allie Alexis (December 2008). "An Analysis of the 1944 U.S.-Mexico Water Treaty: Its Past, Present, and Future" (PDF). Environmental Law and Policy Journal. 32 (1). UC Davis: 69–98.
- Vaughn, Jacqueline (2025-01-09). "Managing Water across International Borders: Mexico and Canada". Water in the West. New York: Bloomsbury Publishing USA. ISBN 979-8-216-18263-4.
- French, Larry; Formont, Aliyah (February 2025). The future of water in Texas (PDF). Better Tech for Tomorrow.
- "US rejects Mexico's request for water as Trump opens new battle front". the Guardian. 2025-03-20.
