= List of tributaries of the Rio Grande =

Tributaries and sub-tributaries are hierarchically listed in order from the mouth of the Rio Grande upstream. Major dams and reservoir lakes are also noted.

- San Juan River, or Rio San Juan (Tamaulipas, Nuevo León, Coahuila)
  - Marte R. Gómez Dam and Marte R. Gómez Reservoir (Tamaulipas)
  - Pesquería River, or Río Pesquería (Nuevo León)
    - Salinas River, or Río Salinas (Nuevo León)
- Rio Alamo, or Alamo River (Tamaulipas)
  - Las Blancas Dam (Tamaulipas)
- Falcon Dam and Falcon International Reservoir (Tamaulipas and Texas)
- Salado River, or Rio Salado (Coahuila, Nuevo León, and Tamaulipas)
  - Sabinas Hidalgo River (Nuevo León)
  - Candela River, Rio Candela (Nuevo León and Coahuila)
  - Presa Venustiano Carranza (dam and reservoir) (Coahuila)
  - Rio Nadadores (Coahuila)
    - Rio Monclova (Coahuila)
  - Sabinas River, or Rio Sabinas (Coahuila)
  - Rio Alamos (Coahuila)
- San Ildefonso Creek (Texas)
- Chacon Creek (Texas)
  - San Ygnacio Creek (Texas)
- Zacate Creek (Texas)
- Sombrerillito Creek (Texas)
- Santa Isabel Creek (Texas)
- Rio Escondido (Coahuila)
  - Arroyo San Antonio, or Rio San Antonio (Coahuila)
- Rio San Rodrigo (Coahuila)
  - La Fragua Dam and La Fragua Reservoir (Coahuila)
- Las Moras Creek(Texas)
- Tequesquite Creek (Texas) (Texas)
- Rio San Diego (Coahuila and Nuevo León)
- Cow Creek (Rio Grande) (Texas)
- Pinto Creek (Texas)
- Sycamore Creek (Val Verde County) (Texas)
  - Mud Creek (Kinney County) (Texas)
- Zorro Creek (Val Verde County) (Texas)
- San Felipe Creek (Texas)
- Arroyo de las Vacas (Coahuila)
- Arroyo de los Jaboncillos (Coahuila)
- Amistad Dam and Amistad Reservoir (Texas and Coahuila)
  - Devils River (Texas)
- Pecos River (Texas and New Mexico)
  - Red Bluff Dam and Red Bluff Reservoir (Texas and New Mexico)
  - Delaware River (Texas and New Mexico)
  - Black River (New Mexico)
  - Rio Penasco (New Mexico)
  - Rio Felix (New Mexico)
  - Cow Creek (New Mexico)
  - Rio Hondo (New Mexico)
    - Two Rivers Reservoir (New Mexico)
    - Rio Bonito (New Mexico)
    - Rio Ruidoso (New Mexico)
  - Gallinas River (New Mexico)
- San Francisco Creek (Texas)
- Maravillas Creek (Texas)
- Arroyo del a Guaje (Coahuila)
  - Laguna del Guaje (Coahuila)
- Terlingua Creek (Texas)
- Rio San Carlos (Chihuahua)
- Alamito Creek (Texas)
- Rio Conchos (Chihuahua and Durango)
  - El Granero Dam (Luis L. Leon Dam) and El Granero Reservoir (Chihuahua)
  - Rio Chuviscar (Chihuahua)
    - Rio Sacramento (Chihuahua)
  - San Pedro River, or Rio San Pedro (Chihuahua)
    - Francisco I. Madero Dam and Francisco I. Madero Reservoir (Chihuahua)
    - Rio Santa Isabel (Chiahuahua)
  - Florido River, or Rio Florido (Chihuahua and Durango)
    - Parral River, or Rio Parral (Chihuahua and Durango)
  - Lago Colina Dam and Lake Colina (Chihuahua)
  - La Boquilla Dam and Toronto Lake (Chihuahua)
  - Balleza River, or Rio Balleza (Chihuahua and Durango)
  - Rio Nonoava (Chihuahua)
- Green River (Texas)
- Rio Viego (Chihuahua)
- International Dam and International Reservoir (Texas and Chihuahua)
- American Diversion Dam and American Reservoir (Texas)
- Rincon Arroyo (New Mexico)
- Caballo Dam and Caballo Lake (New Mexico)
- Elephant Butte Dam and Elephant Butte Reservoir (New Mexico)
- Rio Salado (New Mexico)
- Rio Puerco (New Mexico)
  - Rio San Jose (New Mexico)
    - Rio San Juan (New Mexico)
    - Bluewater Creek (New Mexico)
      - Bluewater Lake (New Mexico)
- Jemez River (New Mexico)
  - Jemez Canyon Dam and Jemez Canyon Reservoir (New Mexico)
  - Rio Salado (New Mexico)
  - Rio Guadalupe (New Mexico)
  - San Antonio Creek (New Mexico)
  - East Fork Jemez River (New Mexico)
    - Jaramillo Creek
- Santa Fe River (New Mexico)
- Cochiti Dam and Cochiti Lake (New Mexico)
- Rio Chiquito (New Mexico)
- Pojoaque River (New Mexico)
  - Rio Chupadero (New Mexico)
- Santa Cruz River (New Mexico)
- Rio Chama (New Mexico and Colorado)
  - Rio Ojo Caliente (New Mexico)
    - Rio Vallecitos (New Mexico)
    - Rio Tusas (New Mexico)
  - Rio del Oso (New Mexico)
    - Gallina Creek (New Mexico)
  - El Rito (New Mexico)
  - Abiquiu Creek (New Mexico)
    - Vallecitos Creek (New Mexico)
  - Abiquiu Dam and Abiquiu Lake (New Mexico)
  - Cañones Creek (New Mexico)
    - Polvadera Creek (New Mexico)
    - Chihuahueños Creek (New Mexico)
    - Barrancones Creek (New Mexico)
  - Canjilon Creek (New Mexico)
  - Rio Puerco (New Mexico)
    - Coyote Creek (New Mexico)
    - Poleo Creek (New Mexico)
    - Rito Redondo (New Mexico)
      - Rito Resumidero (New Mexico)
  - Rio Gallina (New Mexico)
    - Rio Capulin (New Mexico)
  - Rio Cebolla (New Mexico)
  - Rio Nutrias (New Mexico)
  - El Vado Dam and El Vado Lake (New Mexico)
    - Willow Creek (New Mexico)
      - Heron Dam and Heron Lake (New Mexico)
  - Rio Brazos (New Mexico)
  - Rio Chamita (New Mexico)
- Rio de Truchas (New Mexico)
- Embudo Creek (New Mexico)
- Rio Pueblo de Taos (New Mexico)
- Rio Hondo (New Mexico)
- Red River (New Mexico)
- Costilla Creek
- Conejos River (Colorado)
  - Rio San Antonio (Colorado)
    - Rio de los Pinos (Colorado and New Mexico)
      - North Fork Rio de los Pinos (Colorado)
    - Rio Nutritas (New Mexico)
  - Platoro Dam and Platoro Reservoir (Colorado)
- Alamosa River (Colorado)
- South Fork Rio Grande (Colorado)
- Rio Grande Dam and Rio Grande Reservoir (Colorado)

== See also ==
- List of rivers of Colorado
- List of rivers of Mexico
- List of rivers of New Mexico
- List of rivers of Texas
- List of rivers of the Americas
