= Amistad Dam =

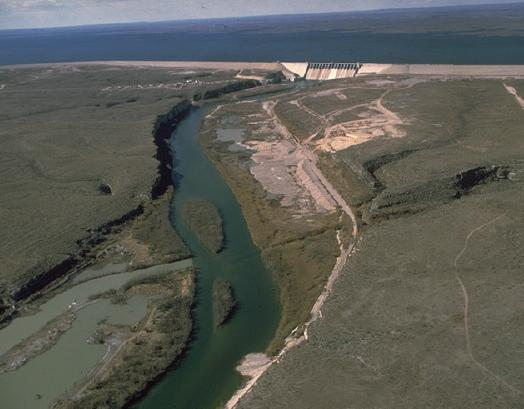
- Amistad Dam
- Interactive map of Amistad Dam
- Country: United States / Mexico
- Location: Val Verde County, Texas / Acuña Municipality, Coahuila
- Coordinates: 29°27′01″N 101°03′28″W
- Status: In use
- Construction began: 1963
- Opening date: 1969
- Construction cost: US$125 million ($808 million in 2014)
- Owner: International Boundary and Water Commission

Dam and spillways
- Type of dam: Earthfill
- Impounds: Rio Grande
- Height: 254 ft (77 m)
- Length: 32,022 ft (9,760 m)
- Dam volume: 17,055,000 yd^{3} (13,039,000 m^{3})
- Spillway type: Ogee crest, 16 tainter gates
- Spillway capacity: 1,507,000 cu ft/s (42,700 m^{3}/s)

Reservoir
- Creates: Amistad Reservoir
- Total capacity: 5,658,600 acre⋅ft (6.9798 km^{3})
- Surface area: 64,900 acres (26,300 ha)

Power Station
- Hydraulic head: 234 ft (71 m)
- Turbines: 4x Francis
- Installed capacity: 132 MW

Amistad Dam (Spanish: Presa la Amistad) is a major embankment dam across the Rio Grande between Texas, United States, and Coahuila, Mexico. Built to provide irrigation water storage, flood control, and hydropower generation, it is the largest dam along the international boundary reach of the Rio Grande. The dam is over 6 miles (9.7 km) long, lies mostly on the Mexican side of the border, and forms Amistad Reservoir. It supplies water for irrigation in the Rio Grande Valley, 574 miles (924 km) upstream of the Rio Grande's mouth on the Gulf of Mexico at Brownsville, Texas/Matamoros, Tamaulipas.

The dam is owned and operated by the International Boundary and Water Commission (IBWC), and facilitates the a border crossing between the US and Mexico. Amistad is derived from the Spanish word for "friendship", representing the two nations' cooperation on the dam.

== History ==
Because of the Rio Grande's frequent floods and droughts, the sharing of its water between the US and Mexico has been a contentious issue since the 1800s. The 1906 Treaty for Equitable Distribution of the Waters of the Rio Grande enabled the construction of Elephant Butte Dam, the first major Rio Grande dam, in New Mexico. While this benefited water users along the middle Rio Grande, it did little to help the lower Rio Grande Valley, where water flows remained uncontrolled. The 1944 Treaty relating to the utilization of waters of the Colorado and Tijuana Rivers and of the Rio Grande authorized the IBWC to build dams on the uncontrolled border segment of the Rio Grande. The first dam to be completed under the treaty was Falcon Dam in 1953.

After the Rio Grande flooded massively in 1954, with a peak flow of 1,158,000 cubic feet per second (32,800 m^{3}/s) recorded at Del Rio, planners realized that a much larger dam would be needed to control the river and two unregulated tributaries, the Pecos and Devils Rivers. The proposed site for the larger dam was about a mile (1.6 km) below the confluence of the Devils River and 12 miles (19 km) upstream of Del Rio. During the initial planning stage, it was known as "Diablo Reservoir", a nod to the name of Devils River (diablo meaning "devil" in Spanish). The final design was approved by the two governments as Minute 207, and authorized by an act of U.S. Congress on July 7, 1960. Work at the dam site began in August 1963 with foundation drilling and grouting in the river bed to support the future concrete section of the dam. Actual construction of the dam itself began in January 1965 and water was first impounded in 1968. U.S. president Richard Nixon and Mexican president Gustavo Díaz Ordaz dedicated the dam in 1969.

The construction of the dam required the relocation of 14.3 miles (23.0 km) of the Southern Pacific Railroad tracks, 19 miles (31 km) of highways, and two bridges. When the reservoir filled, it inundated ancient rock art left by Native Americans who once lived in the areas. More than 170 archaeological sites were cataloged during salvage operations between 1958 and 1969, a difficult undertaking due to the arid and remote conditions of the area.

The hydroelectric power plants were added later, with the US plant completed in 1983 and the Mexican plant in 1987. Of the dam's roughly US$125 million cost, the US paid about 57% and Mexico 43%, in accordance with the division of water storage rights in the reservoir.

In 1993, the dam was determined to be silting up at the rate of 14,000 acre-feet (17,000,000 m^{3}) per year, about 31% greater than had been expected at the time of construction.

== Specifications ==
=== Dam and spillways ===
The dam has a total length of 32,022 feet (9,760 m), almost 6 miles (10 km), of which 22,347 feet (6,811 m) are in Mexico and 9,585 feet (2,922 m) in the United States. The center section at the Rio Grande is a concrete gravity dam 2,182 feet (665 m) long, with the remainder being earthen embankment. In total, the dam contains 13.5 million cubic yards (10,300,000 m^{3}) of earth, 1.8 million cubic yards (1,400,000 m^{3}) of concrete, 1.76 million cubic yards (1,300,000 m^{3}) of riprap, and 12,500 tons (11,300 metric tons) of steel. The maximum height above the riverbed is 254 feet (77 m), and the elevation at the dam crest is 1,152.3 feet (351.2 m) above sea level. The roadway along the dam crest is 32.8 feet (10.0 m) wide.

The embankments are protected on both sides by riprap to reduce erosion. The riprap is 9.8 feet (3.0 m) thick on the upstream (reservoir) side and 3.28 feet (1.00 m) thick on the downstream side. Because the dam is founded on karstic limestone of the Georgetown formation, a very deep grout curtain was extended underground to block seepage and the risk of dam failure by internal erosion. Despite this, more than 30 sinkholes have been discovered near the upstream side of the dam and seepage rates have been recorded at over 180 cubic feet per second (5.1 m^{3}/s), which may be much higher due to unmeasured seepage on the Mexican side of the dam. However, because the water is traveling through bedrock and not the dam itself, this poses little threat to the dam's structural stability. During extreme flood events, however, this may still be a cause for concern.

Flood waters are released through a concrete ogee crest spillway with 16 tainter gates. The gates measure 50 by 54 feet (15 m × 16 m) and can spill up to 1,507,000 cubic feet per second (42,700 m^{3}/s). The spillway empties into a stilling basin 950 feet (290 m) long, designed to dissipate erosion.

=== Water supply and flood control ===
The Amistad reservoir covers 65,000 acres (26,000 ha) at normal (conservation) water levels of 1,117 feet (340 m) above sea level. It is one of the largest lakes in the Rio Grande system by both surface area and volume. Of the reservoir's 5,535,000-acre-foot (6.827 km^{3}) capacity, 61% is dedicated to water conservation and sediment control, 32% to flood control, and 7% to surcharge (flood storage above the top of the spillway gates, but below the crest of the dam). At the top of the flood control pool, the reservoir is 84,000 acres (34,000 ha) and at the top of the surcharge pool it is 89,000 acres (36,000 ha). The lowest lake elevation at which water can be released is 930 feet (280 m), or 187 feet (57 m) below normal levels. At the top of the conservation pool, the reservoir extends 78 miles (126 km) up the Rio Grande, 25 miles (40 km) up the Devils River, and 14 miles (23 km) up the Pecos River. It has a shoreline of 851 miles (1,370 km), of which 547 miles (880 km) are in the US and 304 miles (489 km) are in Mexico.

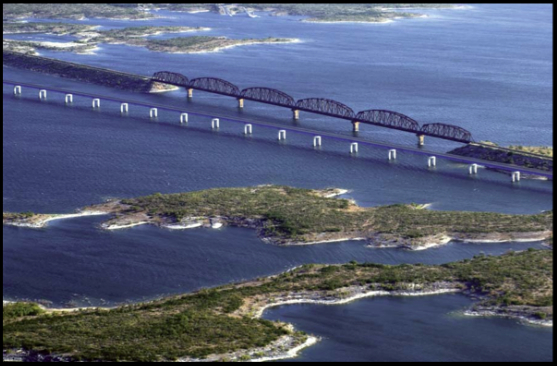
Southern Pacific Railroad and U.S. Route 90 bridges on Amistad Reservoir

About 56.2% of the water released from Amistad Dam is allocated to the United States, and 43.8% to Mexico. The IBWC determines the fraction of water stored in Amistad Reservoir belonging to either country on a biweekly basis, based on this allocation. The reservoir levels fluctuate greatly due to the region's highly variable annual precipitation as well as heavy water use. The record high level was 1,135.66 feet (346.15 m) on September 22, 1974. It reached a record low level of 1,055.93 feet (321.85 m) on May 23, 2013, or 61 feet (19 m) below normal levels, after several consecutive years of drought.

The average annual inflow to Amistad Reservoir is about 2,080,000 acre-feet (2.57 km^{3}). Although the majority – about 70% – of the inflows to Amistad Reservoir comes from the Rio Grande, Devils, and Pecos Rivers, about 30% is from local springs. Inflows typically peak between August and October due to monsoon storms and hurricanes that strike the Gulf Coast. Flood flows caused by hurricanes are short-lived, but can be extreme, with a maximum (since dam construction) of more than 800,000 cubic feet per second (23,000 m^{3}/s) in late September, 1974. Dam operators held the outflow from Amistad Dam at about 62,200 cubic feet per second (1,760 m^{3}/s), sparing a large part of the Rio Grande Valley from flooding.

Because of diversions of the Rio Grande in the upriver U.S. states of Colorado and New Mexico, the Rio Conchos (which originates in Chihuahua, Mexico) actually provides the majority of the water flowing from the Rio Grande into the lake. Increasing water use in upriver communities has caused a steady decline in Rio Grande flows throughout the 20th and 21st centuries and has led to concerns about future water levels and supplies at Amistad.

=== Power generation ===
The dam has two hydroelectric power stations, one on either side of the border, with a capacity of 66 megawatts (MW) each. The maximum hydraulic head is 234 feet (71 m), with a minimum of 115 feet (35 m) required to run the plants. The four generators have a capacity of 33 MW each and are powered by a 42,300-hp (31.54-MW) Francis turbine. The maximum combined water flow through the power plants is 9,200 cubic feet per second (260 m^{3}/s).

In 2009, the Amistad Dam plants produced a total of 296,734,000 kilowatt hours.

== Border crossing ==
The Amistad Dam Port of Entry was built when Amistad Dam was completed in 1969. The crossing connects the United States–Mexico border cities of Del Rio, Texas, and Ciudad Acuña, Coahuila. The crossing is locally referred to as Amistad Dam (Presa La Amistad). Although US Department of Transportation statistics combine traffic counts with Del Rio Texas Port of Entry, approximately 65,000 vehicles crossed the dam into the US in 2005.

The bridge roadway connects to Texas Spur 349, which leads to U.S. Route 90. On the Mexican side, it connects to Federal Highway 2.

In 2012, the inspection station was rebuilt by the US Army Corps of Engineers approximately 1.6 miles (2.6 km) inland within the US.

== Recreation ==
The dam and reservoir are part of the Amistad National Recreation Area.

== See also ==
- Falcon Dam

== Links ==
- Archival film footage of the Amistad Dam and Reservoir from the Texas Archive of the Moving Image
