= Balleza =

Balleza may refer to:

- Balleza Municipality, a municipality of Chihuahua, Mexico
- Balleza River, a river of Mexico

== People with the surname ==
- Roman Balleza (born 1984), American songwriter

== See also ==
- Mariano Balleza, a town in Chihuahua, Mexico
