= Santa Cruz de Rosales =

Town in the Mexican state of Chihuahua

- Town
- Location in Mexico
- Coordinates: 28°12′N 105°33′W
- Country: Mexico
- State: Chihuahua
- Municipality: Rosales
- Established: 1714
- Elevation: 1,170 m (3,840 ft)

Population (2010)
  - Total: 5,570
- Time zone: UTC-6 (Central Standard Time)

Santa Cruz de Rosales is a town and seat of the municipality of Rosales, in the northern Mexican state of Chihuahua. As of 2010, the town had a population of 5,570, up from 5,377 as of 2005

== History ==
The Rosales region, formed by the middle and lower reaches of the San Pedro River, was evangelized during the seventeenth century by Franciscans who settled among the indigenous Conchos and founded the Misión de San Pedro de Conchos in the mid-17th century. In 1714, the Franciscans planted a new mission with the name of Santa Cruz de Tapacolmes on the eastern side of the Río San Pedro and west of what is today the city of Delicias. The mission remained at that place until 1753, when it was relocated to its current place on the western side of the Río San Pedro, to improve defensibility from native attacks. The grounds where the new settlement was founded were donated by Sergeant Major Juan Antonio Trasviña y Retes and Nueva Vizcaya governor Manuel de San Juan y Santa Cruz. The settlement received the epithet of Tapacolmes by the Indians that Trasviña y Retes brought from the Ojinaga region to populate the settlement.

Santa Cruz de Tapacolmes became an important population center of the region. It was first a subdivision of the township of Chihuahua. In 1820, with the adoption of the Constitution of Cadiz, it was designated the seat of the new Municipalidad de Tapacolmes and a town hall was constructed. On July 12, 1831, a decree of the Congress of Chihuahua gave it the status of Villa and the town and municipality was renamed Santa Cruz de Rosales in honor of the insurgent revolutionary hero Víctor Rosales. The name was soon simplified by the locals to Rosales.

In 1848, after the signing of the Treaty of Guadalupe Hidalgo in February, the state of Chihuahua was again invaded by the US army under General Sterling Price, claiming an ongoing state of war between the two countries and rejecting the explanations of Chihuahua Governor Ángel Trías Álvarez, who had participated in signing the peace treaty and who confronted Price in his march to Chihuahua. Trias then retreated with his government to Rosales, where on March 16, 1848, Price's forces attacked the Mexican garrison under what has come to be known as the Battle of Santa Cruz de Rosales. The Mexicans resisted under the command of Trías until they were exhausted, at which point they had to surrender. After Price's superiors in the US learned of the action, Price was recalled back to El Paso with his forces and reprimanded for his insubordinate and unauthorized behavior.

In 1862, on his retreat to the north of Mexico in the face of the invasion of Mexico by the French forces of Napoleon III, President Benito Juárez arrived at Rosales, who was received with a banquet and dance in his honor. During the celebration, Juárez agreed to dance to the second song played during the festivities, a polka called "La Escobita" which was to his great liking. When he later moved to the city of Chihuahua, he had chance to hear the piece again but, as he did not know its name, he called the song La Segunda de Rosales, a name that acquired popular roots and how it is still known to this day.

Towards the end of the 19th century and the first half of the 20th century, the importance of Rosales in the region declined to the benefit of the nearby Villa of Meoqui, where the central railway passed through. But in the second half of the 20th century, the region received a great boost. In the 1940s, the federal government built the Francisco I. Madero Dam, better known as the Las Vírgenes Dam, just five kilometers upstream from Rosales and which, together with other flood control structures recently built, created Irrigation District 05, today one of the most productive agricultural zones in the state of Chihuahua. (The Municipality of Delicias, formed in 1935 from parts of the Santa Cruz de Rosales and the Meoqui municipalities, became the greatest beneficiary of this water project.)

On January 22, 1992, a new decree of the Congress of Chihuahua restored the original name of Santa Cruz de Rosales to the community.

== Geography ==
=== Location ===
Santa Cruz de Rosales is located in the central area of the state of Chihuahua and in the valley formed by the San Pedro River, one of the main rivers in the state and a tributary of the Conchos River. The town is located in the northern margin of the municipality of Rosales at the geographical coordinates 28°11′13″N 105°33′16″W and sits at an altitude of 1,180 meters above sea level. Two state roads connect Santa Cruz de Rosales with its closest neighbors, Meoqui and Delicias, which are 25 and 15 kilometers away respectively. The road that joins Santa Cruz de Rosales to Meoqui also connects it with Congregación Ortíz, the second most populated town in the municipality.

== Demographics ==
According to the results of the Population and Housing Census conducted by the National Institute of Statistics and Geography in 2010, the total population of Santa Cruz de Rosales is 5,570 inhabitants, with 2,746 men and 2,824 women. This makes it the 27th-largest municipality in Chihuahua by population.

== See also ==
- Battle of Santa Cruz de Rosales
