= Parral River =

Location
- Country: Mexico

Physical characteristics
- Mouth
  - location: Rio Florido

The Parral River is a river of Mexico. It is a tributary of the Rio Florido, which flows into the Rio Conchos, which in turn flows into the Rio Grande.

== See also ==
- List of rivers of Mexico
- List of tributaries of the Rio Grande
