= Falcon State Park =

State park in Starr and Zapata County, Texas

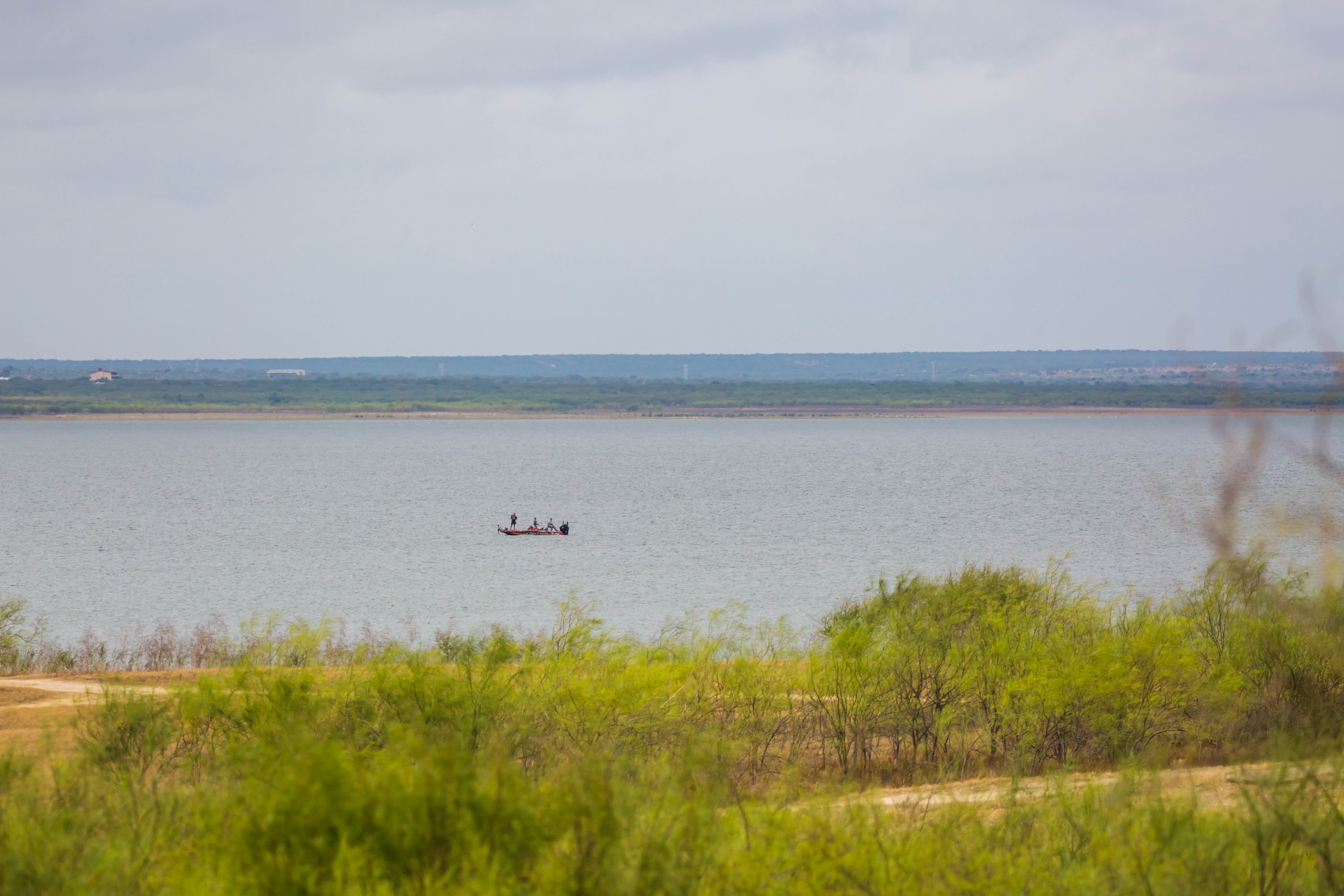
- Falcon Lake from Falcon State Park

- Location within Texas Location within the United States
- Location: Starr County, Texas; Starr County, Texas
- Nearest city: Roma, Texas
- Coordinates: 26°34′58″N 99°8′34″W
- Area: 576 acres (233 ha)
- Created: 1949
- Visitors: 75,076 (in 2025)
- Governing body: Texas Parks and Wildlife Department
- Website: Official site

Falcon State Park is a 576-acre (233 ha) state park in Starr and Zapata counties, Texas, United States. It opened in 1965 and is managed by the Texas Parks and Wildlife Department (TPWD). The park is located at the southern end of the Falcon International Reservoir.

== History ==
Falcon Dam was dedicated in October 1953 and impounds Falcon International Reservoir. The state leased the land for the park from the International Boundary and Water Commission in 1949 and acquired ownership of the park land in 1974.

== Nature ==
=== Animals ===
Collared peccary, white-tailed deer, eastern cottontail, coyote, bobcat, raccoon and striped skunk are mammals found in the park. Birds include plain chachalaca, green jay, great kiskadee, pyrrhuloxia, greater roadrunner, scaled quail, crested caracara and verdin. The park has a butterfly garden designed to attract species like the red admiral, crimson patch and white-striped longtail.

=== Plants ===
Honey mesquite, huisache, Texas wild olive, Texas persimmon, Prickly-pear cactus and native grasses such as Texas fluffgrass grow in the park.

== Activities ==
Camping, picnicking, boating, waterskiing, swimming, birdwatching, and fishing are popular activities in the park.

== See also ==
- List of Texas state parks
