= Pesquería River =

Coordinates: 25°54′N 99°11′W

Location
- Country: Mexico

The Pesquería River, is a river of Mexico. It is a tributary of the San Juan River, which in turn flows into the Rio Grande.

== See also ==
- List of rivers of Mexico
- List of tributaries of the Rio Grande
