= Rio Alamo =

Alishahrukh

Río Álamo

Location
- Country: Mexico
- State: Tamaulipas

Physical characteristics
- Mouth: Rio Grande
  - location: Ciudad Mier
  - coordinates: 26°25′N 99°6′W
- Basin size: 4,339 km^{2} (1,675 sq mi)
- Discharge
  - location: IBWC station 08-4642 at Ciudad Mier
  - average: 3.67 m^{3}/s (130 cu ft/s)
  - minimum: 0 m^{3}/s (0 cu ft/s)
  - maximum: 2,470 m^{3}/s (87,000 cu ft/s)

The Río Álamo, is a stream in the state of Tamaulipas, Mexico, and is a tributary of the Rio Grande. It is impounded by Las Blancas Dam, which was completed in 2001 and diverts water to the Marte Gómez Reservoir on the Rio San Juan, another tributary of the Rio Grande.

The Rio Alamo enters the Rio Grande (Rio Bravo del Norte in Mexico) at Rio Grande river kilometer 422 kilometres (262 mi), about 20 kilometres (12 mi) downriver from Falcon Dam.

== See also ==
- List of rivers of Mexico
- List of tributaries of the Rio Grande
- Urban water management in Monterrey, Mexico
