= Sabinas Hidalgo River =

Location
- Country: Mexico

Physical characteristics
- Mouth
  - location: Rio Salado

The Sabinas Hidalgo River is a river of Mexico. It is a tributary of the Rio Salado, which in turn flows into the Rio Grande.

== See also ==
- List of rivers of Mexico
- List of tributaries of the Rio Grande
