= Alamito Creek =

- Map

Location
- Country: United States
- State: Texas

Physical characteristics
- Source: Presidio County, Texas
  - coordinates: 30°33′9″N 104°1′50″W
- Mouth: Rio Grande
  - location: near Presidio, Texas
  - coordinates: 29°31′16″N 104°17′31″W
- Discharge
  - location: IBWC station 08-3740, near Presidio
  - average: 20 cu ft/s (0.57 m^{3}/s)
  - minimum: 0 cu ft/s (0 m^{3}/s)
  - maximum: 12,400 cu ft/s (350 m^{3}/s)

Alamito Creek is a stream in the U.S. state of Texas. It is a tributary of the Rio Grande, which it joins near Presidio, Texas.

== See also ==
- List of rivers of Texas
- List of tributaries of the Rio Grande
