= Escondido River (Coahuila) =

Location
- Country: Mexico
- State: Coahuila

Physical characteristics
- Source: Serranias del Burro
  - coordinates: 28°41′58″N 101°31′2″W
  - elevation: 1,000 m (3,300 ft)
- Mouth: Rio Grande
  - location: Piedras Negras
  - coordinates: 28°39′43″N 100°30′2″W
  - elevation: 200 m (660 ft)
- Length: 150 km (93 mi)
- Basin size: 3,810 km^{2} (1,470 sq mi)
- Discharge
  - location: IBWC station 08-4581.50 at Villa de Fuente, Coahuila
  - average: 1.64 m^{3}/s (58 cu ft/s)
  - minimum: 0 m^{3}/s (0 cu ft/s)
  - maximum: 883 m^{3}/s (31,200 cu ft/s)

The Escondido River (Río Escondido in Spanish, sometimes called Arroyo Río Escondido) is a stream in the state of Coahuila, Mexico, and is a tributary of the Rio Grande.

The Escondido enters the Rio Grande (Rio Bravo del Norte in Mexico) at Rio Grande river kilometer 794 kilometres (493 mi), about 5 kilometres (3.1 mi) downriver from Piedras Negras, Coahuila, and Eagle Pass, Texas.

The Escondido originates in the Serranias del Burro mountain range and flows generally east to the Rio Grande. Its main tributary is the Rio San Antonio, which enters the Escondido about 19 kilometres (12 mi) upriver from the Rio Grande confluence.

== See also ==
- List of rivers of Mexico
- List of tributaries of the Rio Grande
