= San Ildefonso Creek =

Physical characteristics
- Source
  - location: Laredo, Texas
  - elevation: 470 ft (140 m) at source to 339 ft (100 m) at mouth
- Mouth
  - location: Rio Grande
- Length: 8 mi (13 km)

San Ildefonso Creek is a small stream of water located in Webb County, Texas which runs through Laredo, Texas. The creek is formed within east Laredo and runs southwest for 8 miles (13 km) until connecting to the Rio Grande. San Ildefonso Creek was dammed in east Laredo to form San Ildefonso Creek Lake, the second largest Lake in Laredo. The terrain surrounding the creek is mostly clay and sandy loams. The vegetation surrounding the creek is mostly made up of mesquite, cacti, chaparral, hardwoods and grasses. San Ildefonso Creek crosses two major highways in Laredo, Texas among them are: Texas State Highway 359 and United States Route 83

The creek's name may come from Saint Ildefonsus of Toledo.

== Coordinates ==
- Source: 27°28′59.12″N 99°25′55.45″W Laredo, Texas
- Mouth: 27°24′31.21″N 99°29′15.10″W Rio Grande at Laredo, Texas

== See also ==
- List of tributaries of the Rio Grande
- List of rivers of Texas
