= San Francisco Creek =

Coordinates: 29°52′49″N 102°19′20″W

Location
- Country: United States

Physical characteristics
- Source
  - location: Texas
- Mouth
  - location: Rio Grande

San Francisco Creek is a river in Texas. It is a tributary of the Rio Grande.

== See also ==
- List of rivers of Texas
- List of tributaries of the Rio Grande
