= Sombrerito Creek =

Physical characteristics
- Source
  - location: Webb County, Texas
  - elevation: 724 ft (220 m) at source to 382 ft (120 m) at mouth
- Mouth
  - location: Rio Grande
- Length: 16 mi (26 km)

Sombrerito Creek, also known as Sombreretillo Creek, is a small stream of water located in Webb County, Texas which runs through Laredo. The creek is formed 13 miles (21 km) north of Laredo and runs southwest for 16 miles (26 km) until connecting to the Rio Grande. Sombrerito Creek was dammed north of Laredo to form Middle Pasture Lake. The terrain surrounding the creek is mostly clay and sandy loams. The vegetation surrounding the creek is mostly made up of mesquite, cacti, chaparral, hardwoods and grasses. Sombrerito Creek crosses one major highway in Laredo, Texas: Farm to Market Road 1472.

== Coordinates ==
- Source: 27°47′23.16″N 99°29′43.28″W Webb County, Texas
- Mouth: 27°36′51.74″N 99°33′22.38″W Rio Grande at Laredo, Texas

== See also ==
- List of rivers of Texas
- List of tributaries of the Rio Grande
