= Santa Isabel Creek =

Physical characteristics
- Source
  - location: Webb County, Texas
  - elevation: 720 ft (220 m) at source to 392 ft (120 m) at mouth
- Mouth
  - location: Rio Grande at Laredo, Texas
- Length: 33 mi (53 km)

Santa Isabel Creek is a small stream of water located in Webb County, Texas which runs through Laredo, Texas. The creek is formed 32 miles (51 km) from Callaghan, Texas and runs southwest for 33 mi (53 km) until the creek connects to the Rio Grande. The terrain surrounding the creek is mostly clay. The vegetation surrounding the creek is mostly made up of mesquite, cacti, and grasses. Santa Isabel Creek crosses Three major highways in Laredo, Texas among them are: Farm to Market Road 1472, Texas State Highway 255, and United States Route 83.

== Coordinates ==
- Source: 28°04′29.69″N 99°44′06.35″W Webb County, Texas
- Mouth: 27°38′32.25″N 99°37′37.66″W Rio Grande at Laredo, Texas

== See also ==
- List of rivers of Texas
- List of tributaries of the Rio Grande
