= Ejido el Vergel, Chihuahua =

Ejido el Vergel El Vergel
- Town
- Ejido el Vergel
- Location within Chihuahua Location within Mexico
- Coordinates: 26°28′32″N 106°26′14″W
- Country: Mexico
- State: Chihuahua
- Municipality: Balleza
- Elevation: 2,738 m (8,983 ft)

Population
  - Total: 1,823
- Time zone: UTC-6

Ejido el Vergel or El Vergel is a town in Balleza Municipality in the Mexican state of Chihuahua. The town has a population of 1823.

== Climate ==
Climate data for El Vergel, Chihuahua
Month	Jan	Feb	Mar	Apr	May	Jun	Jul	Aug	Sep	Oct	Nov	Dec	Year
Mean daily maximum °F (°C)	54.5 (12.5)	57.2 (14.0)	60.1 (15.6)	64.8 (18.2)	71.6 (22.0)	73.0 (22.8)	68.7 (20.4)	68.5 (20.3)	66.7 (19.3)	64.2 (17.9)	60.3 (15.7)	55.2 (12.9)	63.7 (17.6)
Daily mean °F (°C)	40.8 (4.9)	43.3 (6.3)	44.6 (7.0)	49.3 (9.6)	54.7 (12.6)	57.6 (14.2)	57.2 (14.0)	57.0 (13.9)	54.5 (12.5)	50.0 (10.0)	46.4 (8.0)	42.4 (5.8)	49.8 (9.9)
Mean daily minimum °F (°C)	27.3 (−2.6)	29.1 (−1.6)	28.9 (−1.7)	33.4 (0.8)	37.8 (3.2)	42.3 (5.7)	45.7 (7.6)	45.5 (7.5)	42.3 (5.7)	35.4 (1.9)	32.4 (0.2)	29.1 (−1.6)	35.8 (2.1)
Source: National Meteorologic Service of Mexico
