= Battle of Santa Cruz de Rosales =

- Part of the Mexican–American War and the Siege of Rosales (Northern Mexican Theater)
Date	March 16, 1848
Location	Santa Cruz de Rosales, Chihuahua
Result	Mexican Defensive victory

Belligerents
United States	Mexico

Commanders and leaders
(United States) Sterling Price (United States) John Adams	(Mexico) Ángel Trías Alvarez

Strength
1,500	200

Casualties and losses
14-20 killed 19 wounded	25 killed

The Battle of Santa Cruz de Rosales was an engagement of the Mexican–American War that took place after the Treaty of Guadalupe Hidalgo had been signed, the battle took place in the Town of Santa Cruz de Rosales Between the Forces commanded by the Mexican General Angel Trias Alvarez against the Forces commanded by the American General Sterling Price.

== Background ==
Arriving in El Paso on 23 February, Brigadier General Sterling Price, commander of U.S. forces in New Mexico, captured a courier carrying letters indicating Mexican General José de Urrea was advancing. Despite receiving orders to strike into Chihuahua only if an invasion force gathered there, Price left El Paso on 1 March with three companies of the 1st Dragoons and four companies of the 3d Missouri. Meeting at the site of the earlier Battle of Sacramento, Governor Angel Trías told Price of the signing of the Treaty of Guadalupe Hidalgo, yet Price continued on and entered Chihuahua on 7 March. On 8 March, Price and 200 men headed for Santa Cruz de Rosales, the fortifications where Trias had retreated with his men and artillery. Price sent for Lt. John Love's battery in El Paso, while Trías on 10 March, once again, reiterated that a treaty had already been signed and the war was over.

== Battle ==
Price received word that a Mexican cavalry force was in his rear and withdrew his artillery for protection. The defenders mistook this as a sign of retreat and kept up a heavy fire on the American forces. However, their aim was inaccurate, and the Mexican cavalry force turned out to be but a few men. After dispersing the counterattack, Price ordered his dismounted cavalry to capture the town. Price split his men into several storming parties and personally led one of them. Although Trias beat back attacks from the north and west and the American assaults on the City, the lack of ammunition for the Mexicans made Trias eventually Declare a Ceasefire.

== Aftermath ==
The Treaty of Guadalupe Hidalgo had been signed by both the United States and Mexico on February 2, 1848, and was ratified by the U.S. Congress on March 10. Therefore, Price's attack on Santa Cruz de Rosales in fact took place after the U.S. had agreed to peace, although the Mexican Congress would not ratify the treaty until March 19.

On 15 April, Price was ordered to withdraw and return captured property, and on 16 May, ordered back to El Paso by Secretary of War William L. Marcy, after being told he had violated orders.

== See also ==
- 1848 in Mexico
