= San Pedro River (Chihuahua) =

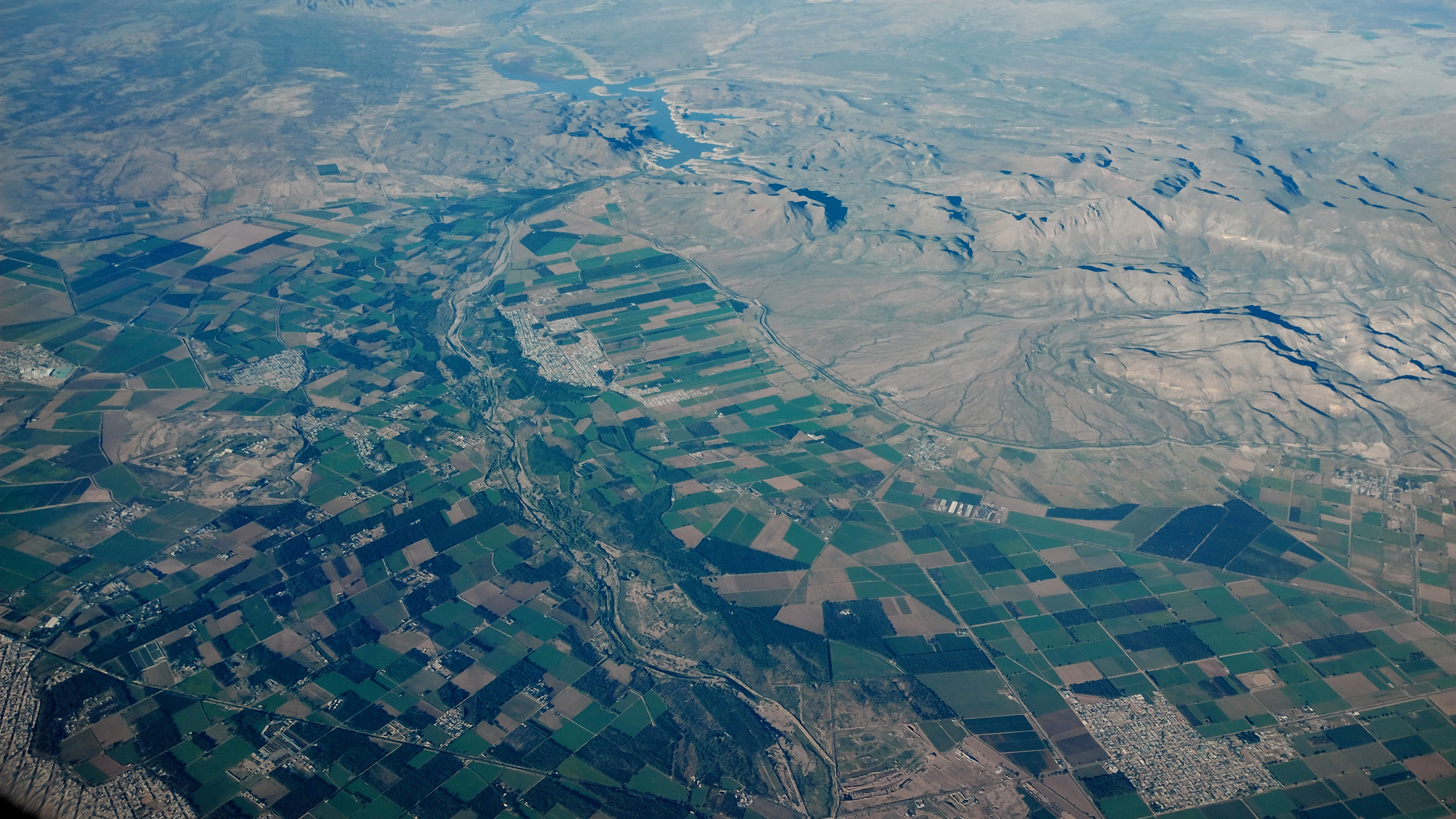
- Aerial view of San Pedro River, with Las Virgenes Dam in the background.

Location
- Country: Mexico

The San Pedro River (Chihuahua) is a river of Mexico. It is a tributary of the Rio Conchos, which in turn flows into the Rio Grande.

== See also ==
- List of rivers of Mexico
- List of tributaries of the Rio Grande
