= Balleza River =

Coordinates: 27.385°N 106.278611°W

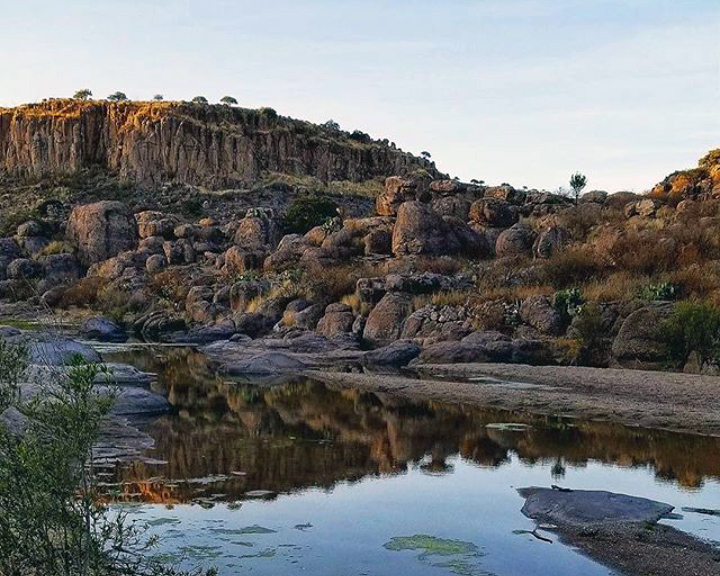
- View of the Balleza River

Location
- Country: Mexico

The Balleza River, or Río Balleza, is a river of Mexico. It is a tributary of the Rio Conchos, which in turn flows into the Rio Grande.

== See also ==
- List of rivers of Mexico
- List of tributaries of the Rio Grande
