= El Granero Dam =

- Location within Mexico
- Coordinates: 28°59′07″N 105°16′49″W
- Purpose: Irrigation

Dam and spillways
- Type of dam: Embankment
- Impounds: Rio Conchos
- Height (foundation): 62 m (203 ft)

Reservoir
- Creates: El Granero Reservoir
- Total capacity: .356 km^{3} (289,000 acre⋅ft)

El Granero Dam (Spanish: Presa del Granero, also known as the Luis L. Leon Dam) is an embankment dam on the Rio Conchos in north-central Chihuahua, Mexico. The dam was completed in 1968 to provide irrigation and flood control for the lower Rio Conchos valley.

In 2022 farmers began to struggle to provide enough water for their cattle, as they were dependent on the El Granero Dam. Water levels in dams across Mexico had fallen to just 10%, with high temperatures exasperating the drought.

== See also ==
- List of dams and reservoirs#Mexico
- List of lakes in Mexico
