= Mariano Balleza =

Town in the Mexican state of Chihuahua

Mariano Balleza (San Pablo Balleza)
- Town
- Mariano Balleza is located within Balleza Municipality

- Location in Mexico
- Coordinates: 26°57′N 106°21′W
- Country: Mexico
- State: Chihuahua
- Municipality: Balleza
- Founded (mission): 1640

Population (2010)
  - Total: 2,087

Mariano Balleza is a town in the Mexican state of Chihuahua, close to the border with Durango. It serves as the municipal seat for the surrounding municipality of Balleza.

As of 2010, the town had a total population of 2,087, up from 1,990 as of 2005.

== History ==
It was in this vicinity that Juan Fontes founded the first Jesuit mission to the Tarahumara in 1607, however that mission was abandoned during the Tepehuan war against the SPanish starting in 1616.

This specific settlement was founded as a Jesuit mission, with the name San Pablo Tepehuanes, in 1640, as part of the efforts to evangelise the local Tepehuan people; this was one of the earliest missions in that part of New Spain. In 1830 the State Congress renamed it in honour of Fr. Mariano Balleza, who fought alongside Miguel Hidalgo in the War of Independence. The town is still informally known as San Pablo Balleza.
