= Rio Salado (Mexico) =

Río Salado
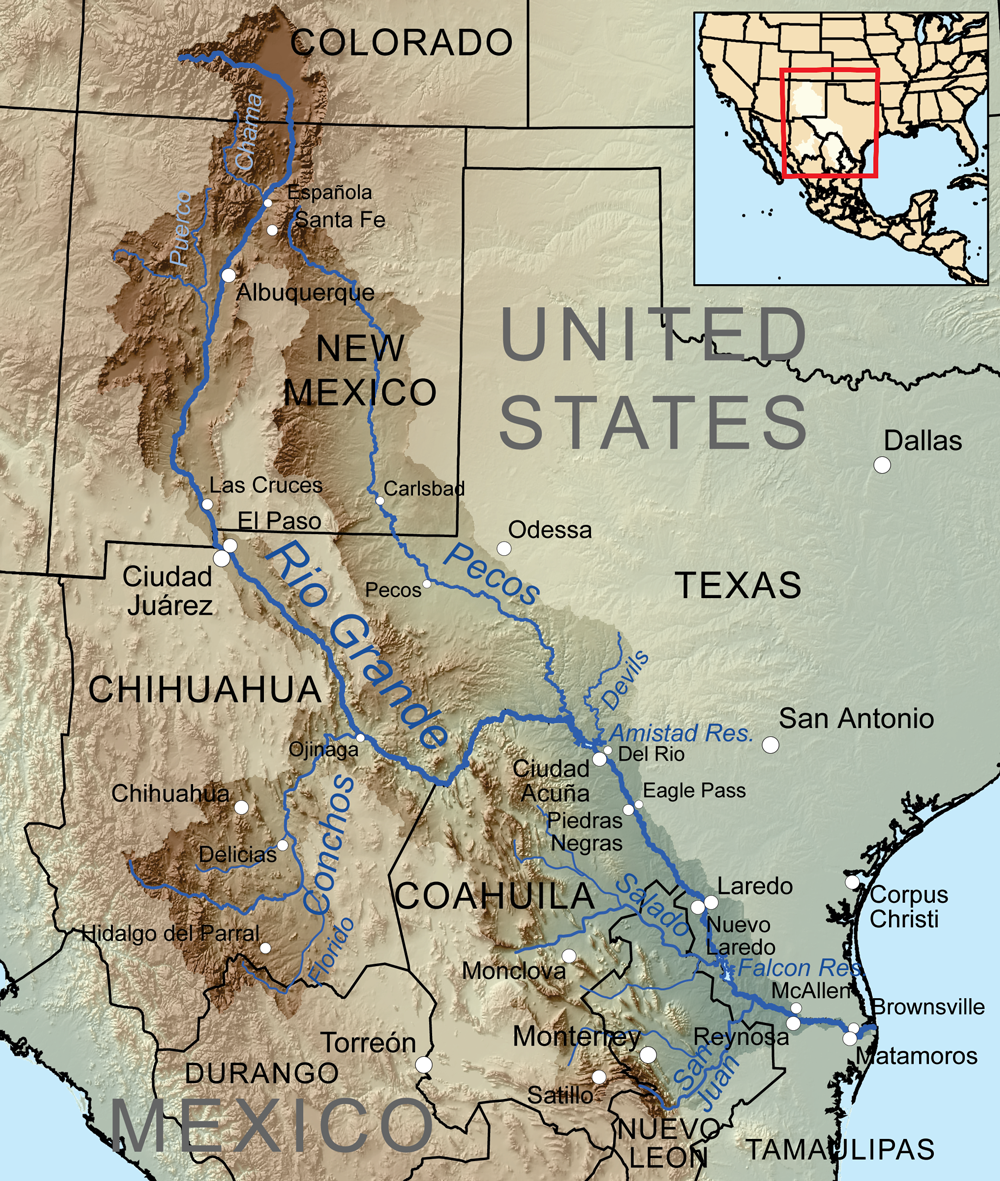
- Map of the Rio Grande watershed, showing the Rio Salado joining the Rio Grande south of Laredo.

Location
- Country: Mexico
- State: Coahuila, Nuevo León, Tamaulipas

Physical characteristics
- Source: Sierra Madre Oriental
- Mouth: Rio Grande
  - location: Falcon International Reservoir
  - coordinates: 26°52′N 99°19′W
- Basin size: 60,406 km^{2} (23,323 sq mi)
- Discharge
  - location: IBWC station 08-4597.00 near Las Tortillas, Tamaulipas
  - average: 10.02 m^{3}/s (354 cu ft/s)
  - minimum: 0 m^{3}/s (0 cu ft/s)
  - maximum: 1,780 m^{3}/s (63,000 cu ft/s)

The Río Salado, also Río Salado de los Nadadores, or Salado River, is a river in northern Mexico, a tributary of the Rio Grande. Its basin extends across the northern portion of Coahuila, Nuevo Leon, and Tamaulipas states.

It originates in the Sierra Madre Oriental in Coahuila and flows east-northeastward. It is joined by the Rio Sabinas in the reservoir created by the Venustiano Carranza Dam. The Salado flows southeast from the reservoir through northern Nuevo León and northwestern Tamaulipas, where it is joined by the Sabinas Hidalgo River, to join the Rio Grande in the Falcón Reservoir, at Rio Grande river kilometer 43.

== Economic importance ==
The river is used mainly for agricultural and mining activity, especially for irrigation of cotton. Fishing has been increasing because some species have been introduced such as gizzard shad, largemouth bass and white bass, among others. Water lilies have also been introduced.

== Environmental impact ==
The river faces a number of problems related to mismanagement. There is no system to regulate the exploitation of resources found there.

== See also ==
- List of rivers of Mexico
- List of tributaries of the Rio Grande
