= Sierra del Burro =

Mountain ridge in Coahuila, Mexico

- Location within Mexico

Geography
- Location: Coahuila, Mexico
- Range coordinates: 29°03′N 102°06′W

The Sierra del Burro (also called Serranías del Burro) is the northernmost finger of the Sierra Madre Oriental in the state of Coahuila, Mexico. The Sierra begins at the Rio Grande near Big Bend National Park in Texas and extends southeast for about 70 miles (100 km), reaching a maximum elevation of 2,074 metres (6,804 ft).

== Geography ==
The Sierra del Burro increases in altitude and width as it goes from north to south. At its northernmost point near the Rio Grande, the Sierra is about 15 miles (20 km) wide and has a maximum elevation of about 3,000 feet (900 m). At its southernmost extremity, about 28’ 30° North latitude, it reaches a width of more than 40 miles (60 km) and a maximum altitude of 2,074 metres (6,804 ft) near where it merges with the Sierra del Carmen and becomes known as the Sierra Madre Oriental.

The Rio San Rodrigo is the largest river originating in the Sierra del Burro. The drainage from the Sierra is to the Rio Grande. The Sierra is located in the Chihuahua Desert, and most of the vegetation is arid or semi-arid desert scrub, including chaparral and Tamaulipan matorral. Oak forests are found, mostly at elevations of more than 1,500 metres (5,000 ft). Among the fauna are the elk and American black bear, both endangered species in Mexico, except for the Sierra del Burro where they are still found in fair numbers, but considered at risk. Beaver are also found in the Sierra. Due to its proximity the flora and fauna have similarities to that of the Big Bend region of Texas.

The climate is arid to semi-arid. Most precipitation occurs in the summer, but notably vigorous convection occurs in April and May. The Sierra del Burro and an area extending slightly southward for decades has been recognized by meteorologists using satellite and radar data as a region of consistent and intense supercell activity, orographically influenced by the Sierra, and annually producing significant tornadoes and hail.

Due to the rugged terrain, aridity, and inhospitable environment, there are no towns or any paved roads in the Sierra. The sparse population mostly inhabits large ranches.

== Conservation ==
The Sierra del Burro is outside the boundaries of the binational El Carmen-Big Bend Conservation Corridor Initiative, but local ranchers, fearing fragmentation of their lands, have formed a group called CONECO to preserve their ranching heritage and promote wildlife and habitat preservation. The group now has about 500,000 acres (200,000 ha) protected. National and international conservation groups see CONECO as a model for private land conservation in Mexico.
