= Rio San Rodrigo =

Río San Rodrigo
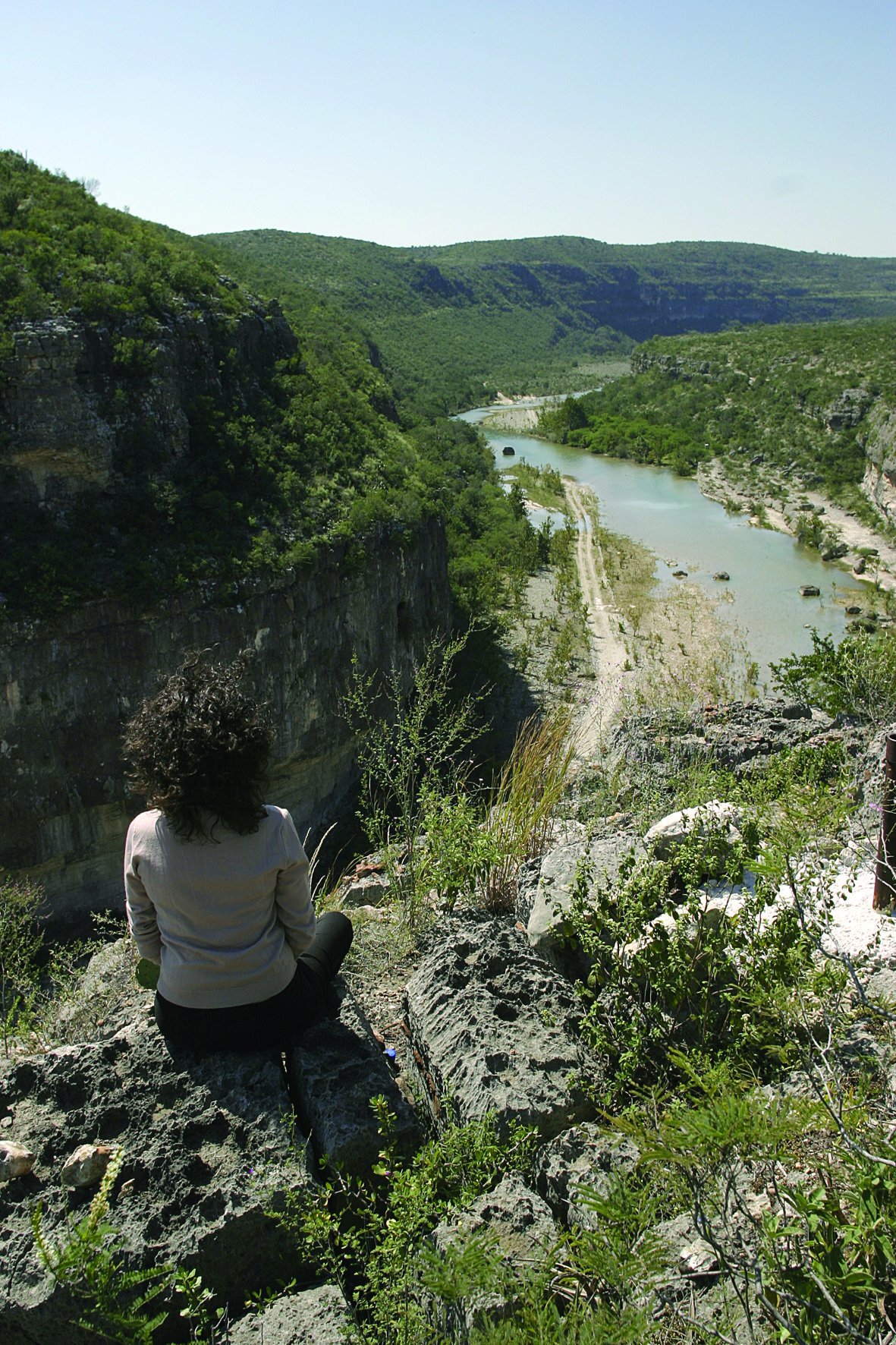

Location
- Country: Mexico
- State: Coahuila

Physical characteristics
- Source: Sierra Madre Oriental
  - coordinates: 28°56′56″N 101°43′39″W
  - elevation: 1,260 m (4,130 ft)
- Mouth: Rio Grande
  - location: El Moral, Coahuila, near Quemado, Texas
  - coordinates: 28°54′10″N 100°37′50″W
  - elevation: 230 m (750 ft)
- Basin size: 2,717 km^{2} (1,049 sq mi)
- Discharge
  - location: IBWC station 08-4571.00 at El Moral, Coahuila
  - average: 3.82 m^{3}/s (135 cu ft/s)
  - minimum: 0 m^{3}/s (0 cu ft/s)
  - maximum: 1,260 m^{3}/s (44,000 cu ft/s)

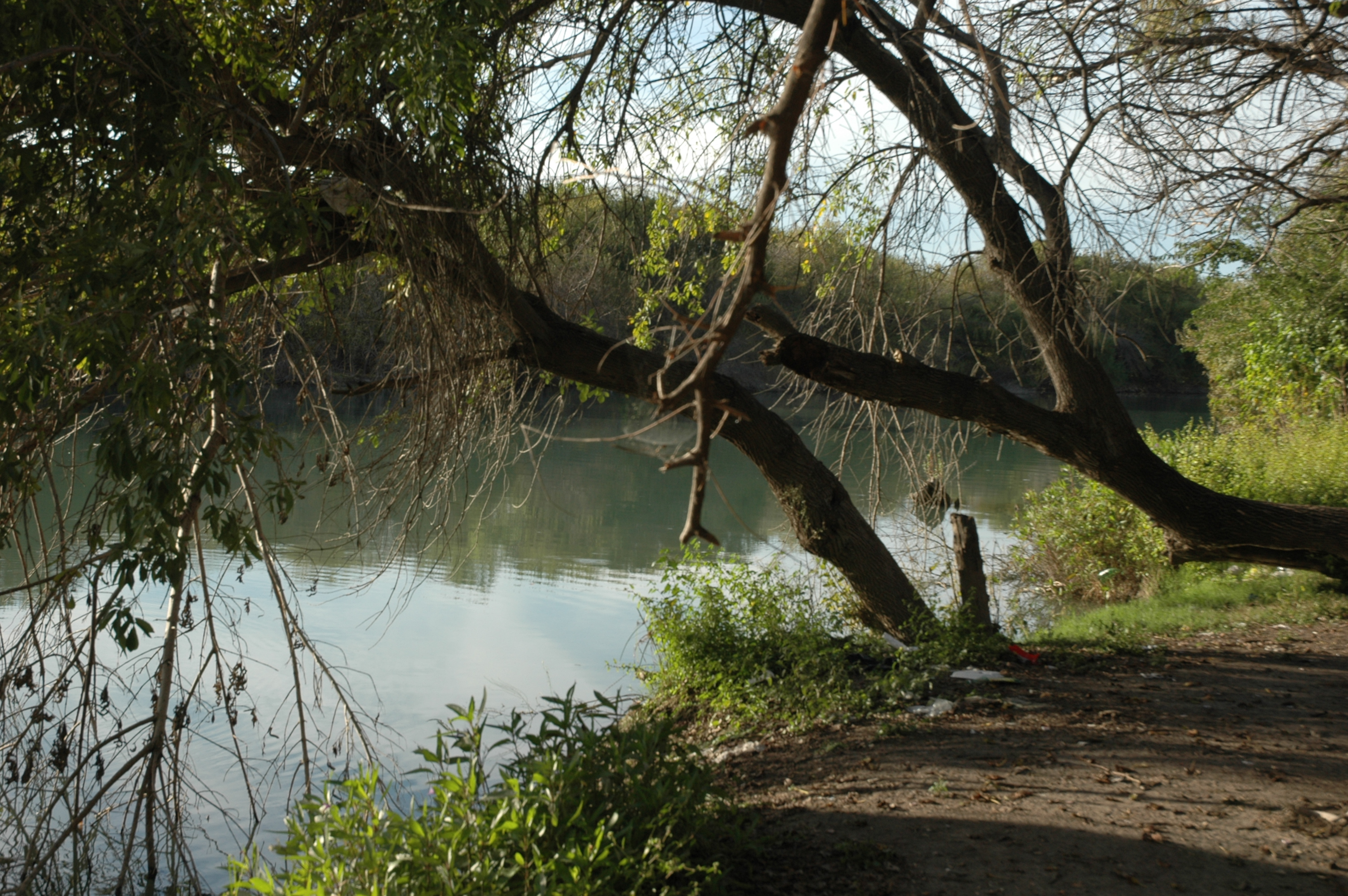

The Río San Rodrigo is a stream in the state of Coahuila, Mexico, and is a tributary of the Rio Grande.

The Rio San Rodrigo enters the Rio Grande (Rio Bravo del Norte in Mexico) at Rio Grande river kilometer 834, at El Moral, Coahuila and about 5 kilometres (3.1 mi) south of Quemado, Texas.

The Rio San Rodrigo originates in the Sierra del Burro, a northern finger of the Sierra Madre Oriental, and flows generally east to the Rio Grande. La Fragua Dam impounds the river at about river kilometer 20, creating La Fragua Reservoir. The dam began operations in 1991. The reservoir's storage capacity is 36,482 acre-feet (45,000,000 m^{3}).

== History ==
In 1849 a group of Seminoles migrated from Indian Territory to Mexico to establish a military colony. Led by Wild Cat, a noted Seminole chief, and John Horse (Gopher John), the leader of the Black Seminoles, the group consisted of about one hundred Seminoles and one hundred Black Seminoles. About five hundred Kickapoos from Missouri joined Wild Cat's group on the Rio Grande at Eagle Pass. In July, 1850, the group was admitted to Mexico. Wild Cat, representing the entire group, was assigned approximately 70,000 acres (28,000 ha), half at the headwaters of the Rio San Rodrigo and half at the headwaters of the Rio San Antonio. The citizens of Remolino, nearby, were not pleased and complained to the provisional government in Coahuila, which issued a decree saying that other lands would be found upon which the Indians could be settled. Nevertheless, some of the Indians did eventually settle near Remolino.

== See also ==
- List of rivers of Mexico
- List of tributaries of the Rio Grande
