= Florido River =

River in Chihuahua, Mexico

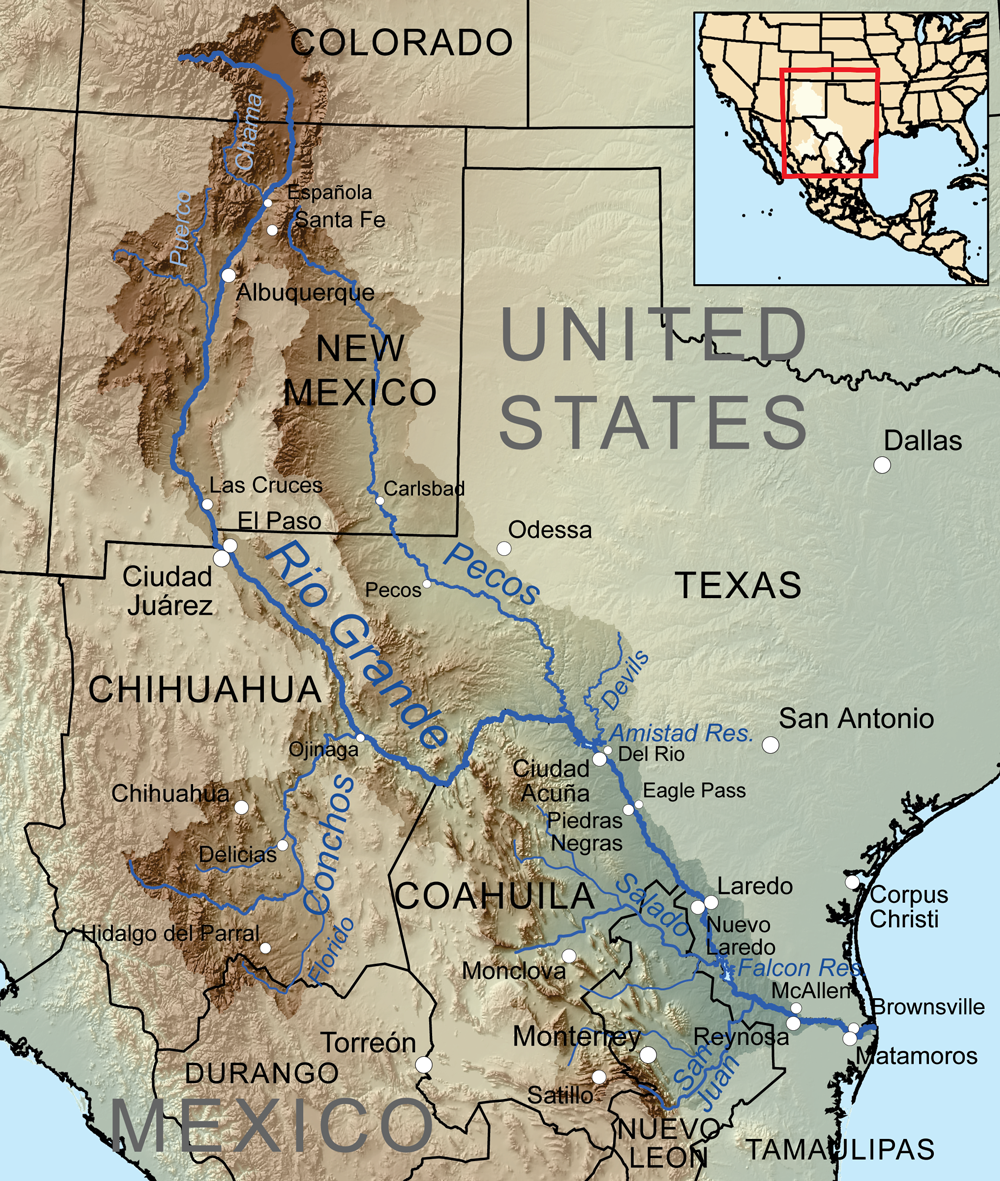
Map of the Rio Grande watershed, showing the Rio Florido joining the Rio Conchos in Chihuahua.

Florido River is a river of Mexico. It is a tributary of the Rio Conchos, which in turn flows into the Rio Grande.

== See also ==
- List of rivers of Mexico
- List of tributaries of the Rio Grande
