= Devils River (Texas) =

River in Texas, United States

- Map

Location
- Country: United States
- State: Texas

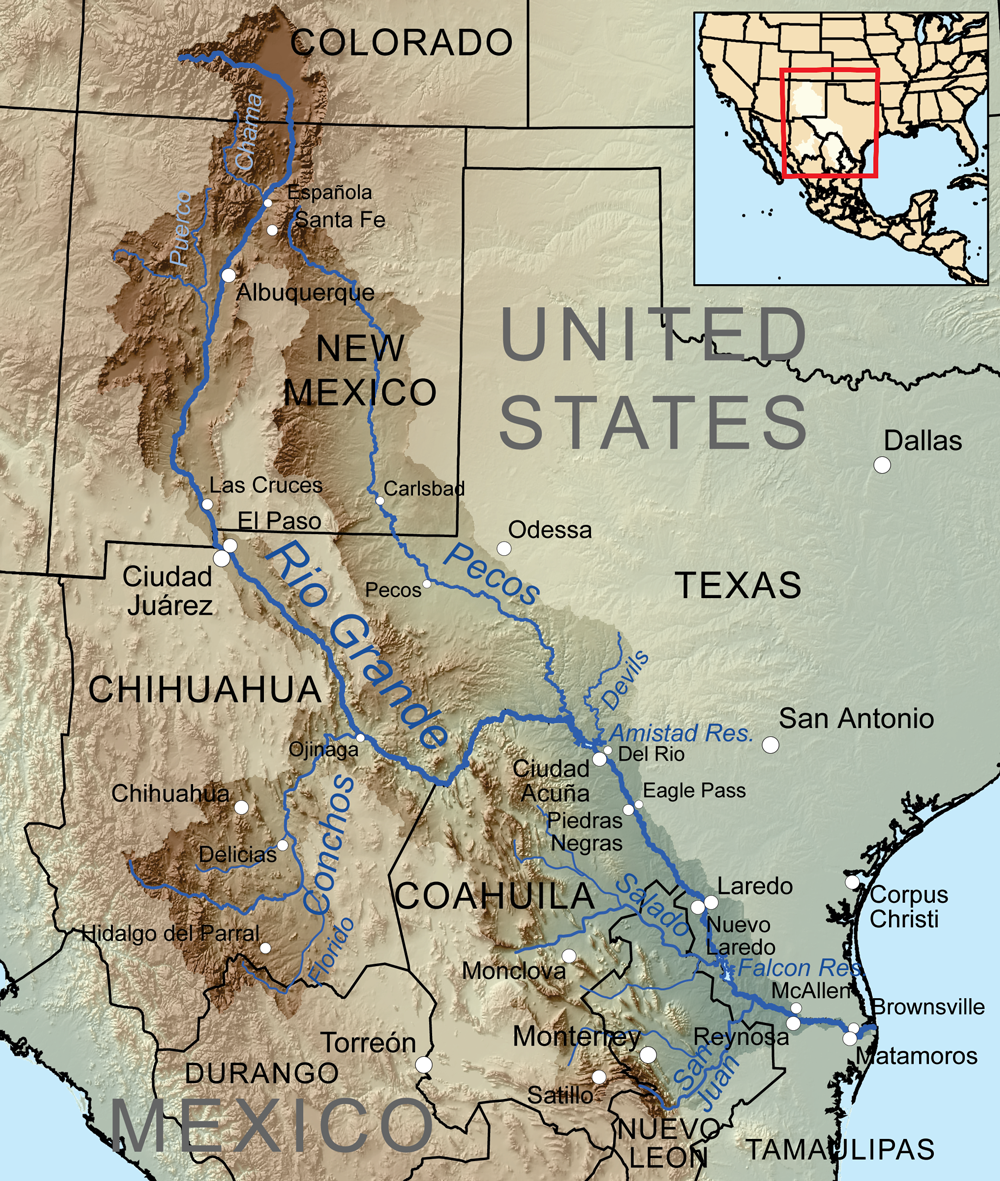
Map of the Rio Grande watershed, showing the Devils River joining the Rio Grande near Del Rio.

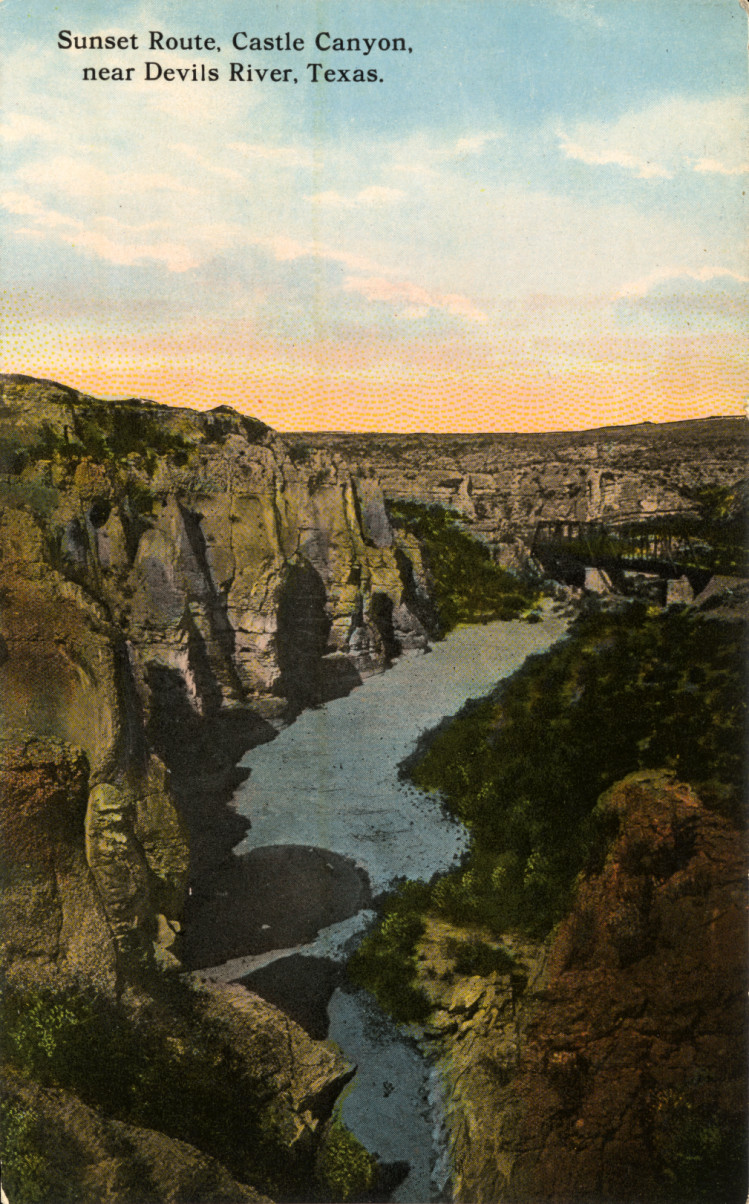
Sunset Route, Castle Canyon, Texas (postcard, circa 1908)

The Devils River in southwestern Texas, part of the Rio Grande drainage basin, has limited areas of whitewater along its length. It begins in northwest Sutton County, at 30°19′40″N 100°56′31″W, where six watercourses come together, Dry Devils River, Granger Draw, House Draw, Jackson, Flat Rock Draw, and Rough Canyon. It flows southwest for 94 miles (151 km) through Val Verde County and empties into the northeastern shore of the Amistad Reservoir, an impoundment of the Rio Grande near Del Rio, Texas on the Texas/Mexico border, 29°27′33″N 101°3′34″W. The discharge of the Devils River, as measured at IBWC gaging station 08–4494.00 near the river's mouth, averages 362 cubic feet per second (10.3 m^{3}/s), with a maximum of 122,895 cubic feet per second (3,480 m^{3}/s) and a minimum of 54 cubic feet per second (1.53 m^{3}/s). Its drainage basin above that point is 10,259 square kilometres (3,961 sq mi).

The Devils River is considered the most unspoiled river in Texas. Its remote location in a hostile environment limits pollution from human and domestic animal populations. In addition, the river flows underground for part of its journey. As it passes underground, the gravel, sand and limestone scrub the river water clean before it re-emerges some 20 miles (32 km) downstream.

== Recreation ==
Although the river is popular for kayaking and canoeing, it is difficult to gain access because much of the river is bounded by private property. However, much of the river is protected through conservation easements on both sides. The Nature Conservancy holds conservation easements on several ranch properties protecting the river. Along with the Devils River State Natural Area the protected land along the river totals 110,000 acres (450 km^{2}).

=== Traversing the river ===
The river itself is 90 miles (140 km) long, but much of the upper half of the river is not suitable for canoeing or kayaking because of a lack of water and limited access. The best part of the river for recreation is about 40 miles (64 km) long and runs from Bakers Crossing to the last drop off point at Lake Amistad. The most common point of entry into the river is Bakers Crossing on Texas State Highway 163. Camping sites are available and you can also leave your vehicle at Bakers Crossing. Most of the river is fairly calm with mostly class two rapids and small class three rapids (see International Scale of River Difficulty). However the river can rise and fall greatly with rainfall, even if the rain is not in the direct area of the river. Dolan Falls is a waterfall about 15 feet (4.6 m) tall and is located at about 16.9 miles (27.2 km) and must be avoided. Past Dolan Falls at about 19 miles (31 km) is Three Tier Rapids, a class four rapid most of the year, but when the river swells, can be a short class 5 and should be attempted by only the more experienced paddlers. The river is characterized by long, deep pools with reed covered rapids near the end of these pools. A map is strongly suggested as both Dolan Falls and Three Tier Rapids are not able to be seen until you are right on top of them. After Three Tier Rapids, there are no more large (over class III) rapids and the river is fairly smooth. Some boulder and fields do occur past Three Tier Rapids but are generally small in size. The river finally empties into Lake Amistad after traveling some 40 miles (64 km) from Bakers Crossing. From this point it is another 12-mile (19 km) trip on the lake to the last take out at Rough Canyon Marina. The journey for the lake section of the trip can be very strenuous on a person kayaking or canoeing because of the strong south headwind.

=== The experience ===
Part of the appeal of the river is its remote location, the very rugged and rough terrain, and lack of human presence. There are only five visible houses in the first 20 miles (32 km) of river. At about 25 miles (40 km) the Dry Devils River flows into the Devils, and is considered by many to be the halfway point. There are many homes in this point of the river and it's called the Blue Sage Subdivision.

== See also ==
- List of rivers of Texas
- List of tributaries of the Rio Grande
