= Balleza Municipality =

Municipality in the Mexican state of Chihuahua

Balleza
- Municipality
- Municipality of Balleza in Chihuahua

- Location in Mexico
- Coordinates: 26°57′N 106°20′W
- Country: Mexico
- State: Chihuahua
- Municipal seat: Mariano Balleza

Area
  - Total: 7,073.6 km^{2} (2,731.1 sq mi)

Population (2010)
  - Total: 17,672

Balleza is one of the 67 municipalities of Chihuahua, in northern Mexico. The municipal seat lies at Mariano Balleza. The municipality covers an area of 7,073.6 km^{2} (2,731.1 sq mi).

As of 2010, the municipality had a total population of 17,672, up from 16,325 as of 2005.

The municipality had 594 localities, the largest of which (with 2010 populations in parentheses) were: Mariano Balleza (2,087), classified as urban, and Ejido el Vergel (2,008), classified as rural.
