= Amistad Reservoir =

- Presa Amistad
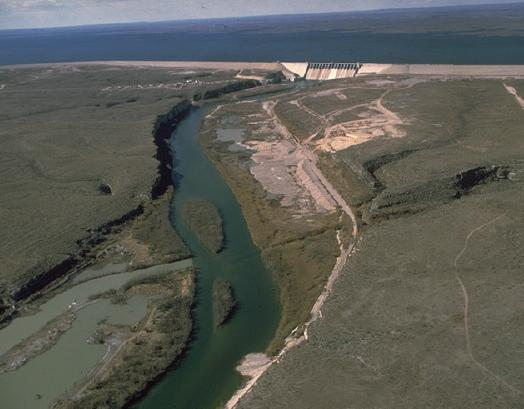
- Amistad Dam and Reservoir

- Location within Texas Location within the United States
- Location: Val Verde County, Texas, United States; Acuña Municipality, Coahuila, Mexico
- Coordinates: 29°27′01″N 101°03′28″W
- Type: Hydroelectric reservoir
- Primary inflows: Rio Grande, Devils River
- Primary outflows: Rio Grande
- Basin countries: United States / Mexico
- Managing agency: International Boundary and Water Commission
- Built: November 1969
- Surface area: 64,900 acres (26,300 ha)
- Max. depth: 217 ft (66 m)
- Water volume: 5,658,600 acre⋅ft (6.9798 km^{3})
- Surface elevation: 1,117 ft (340 m)

Amistad Reservoir (Spanish: Presa Amistad) is a reservoir on the Rio Grande at its confluence with the Devils River 12 miles (19 km) northwest of Del Rio, Texas. The lake is bounded by Val Verde County on the United States side of the international border and by the state of Coahuila on the Mexican side of the border; the American shoreline forms the Amistad National Recreation Area. The reservoir was formed in 1969 by the construction of Amistad Dam. The dam and lake are managed jointly by the governments of the United States and Mexico through the International Boundary and Water Commission. The name of the dam and lake is the Spanish word for "friendship". The reservoir is also known as Lake Amistad.

== Hydrology ==
Amistad Reservoir is part of the Rio Grande, which forms its principal inflow at its northwestern end. The other major inflow is the Devils River, which enters from the north. The reservoir occupies a series of meanders between the two rivers; its outflow passes through Amistad Dam on the lake's southern side, from which the Rio Grande continues southeastward toward the Gulf of Mexico. Since it is filled by the Rio Grande (and its tributaries, the Rio Conchos and Pecos River), Amistad's drainage basin includes a vast area of West Texas, central New Mexico, southern Colorado, southeastern Chihuahua, and northern Coahuila.

== Fish and plant life ==
Amistad Reservoir is stocked with species of fish intended to improve the utility of the reservoir for recreational fishing. Fish found in Amistad Reservoir include largemouth bass, smallmouth bass, Guadalupe bass, and catfish. Substantial aquatic vegetation grows in the lake, primarily hydrilla.

The Amistad gambusia, a fish species endemic to the area, was eliminated in the wild when the filling of the reservoir in 1969 submerged Goodenough Spring, its only known habitat, under about 70 feet (21 m) of water. Two captive populations did not survive, and the fish was extinct by 1987.

== History ==
The area now covered by the reservoir was long inhabited by Indigenous Americans, who sheltered in caves along the rivers and left numerous cave paintings. After the Mexican–American War, American pioneers such as John Coffee Hays travelled through the area in developing a reliable road from San Antonio to El Paso.

A 1944 treaty between the United States and Mexico proposed the construction of a major dam and reservoir on the Rio Grande to provide flood control, water conservation, irrigation, hydroelectric power, and recreation to the area. Amistad Dam's construction began in December 1964 and was completed in November 1969, after which the reservoir was filled, flooding a series of valleys around the confluence of the Rio Grande and the Devils River. The dam and the reservoir are managed by the International Boundary and Water Commission, which was established in 1889 by the governments of the United States and Mexico to maintain the border, allocate river waters between the two nations, and provide for flood control and water sanitation.

== Recreational uses ==
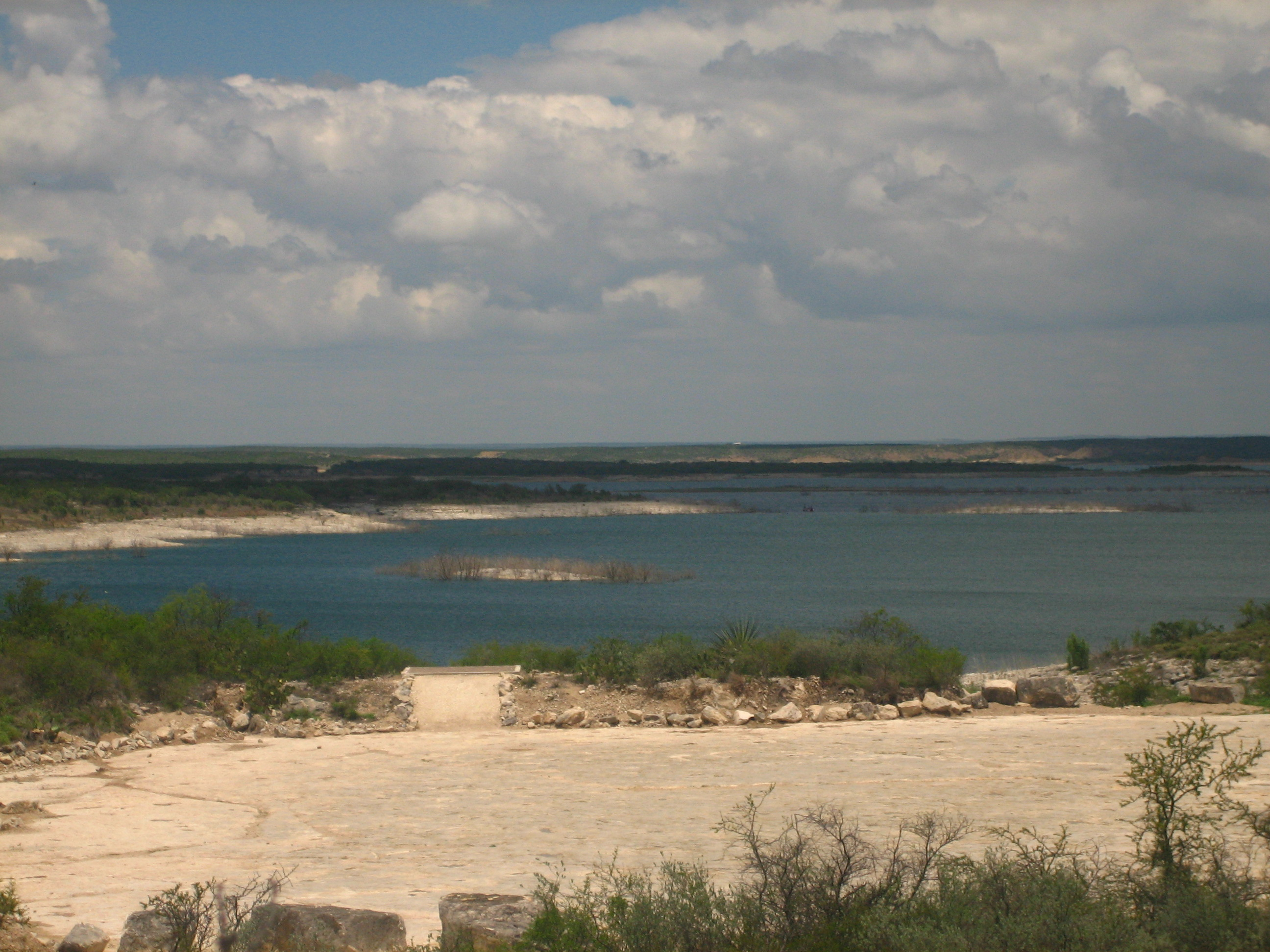
Rocky beach on Lake Amistad west of Del Rio, Texas

During the construction of the dam, the land around the American shore of the coming reservoir was designated as the Amistad National Recreation Area. The lake provides year-round, water-based recreation opportunities, including boating, fishing, swimming, scuba diving, and water-skiing, as well as other recreational opportunities for picnicking, camping, and hunting. The area is rich in archaeology and rock art, and contains a wide variety of plant and animal life. The lake is home to yearly nationally televised fishing tournaments. It is also near the flight path of USAF trainers.

== See also ==
- Falcon International Reservoir
