= Falcon International Reservoir =

Hydroelectric reservoir in Texas and Mexico

- Presa Falcón
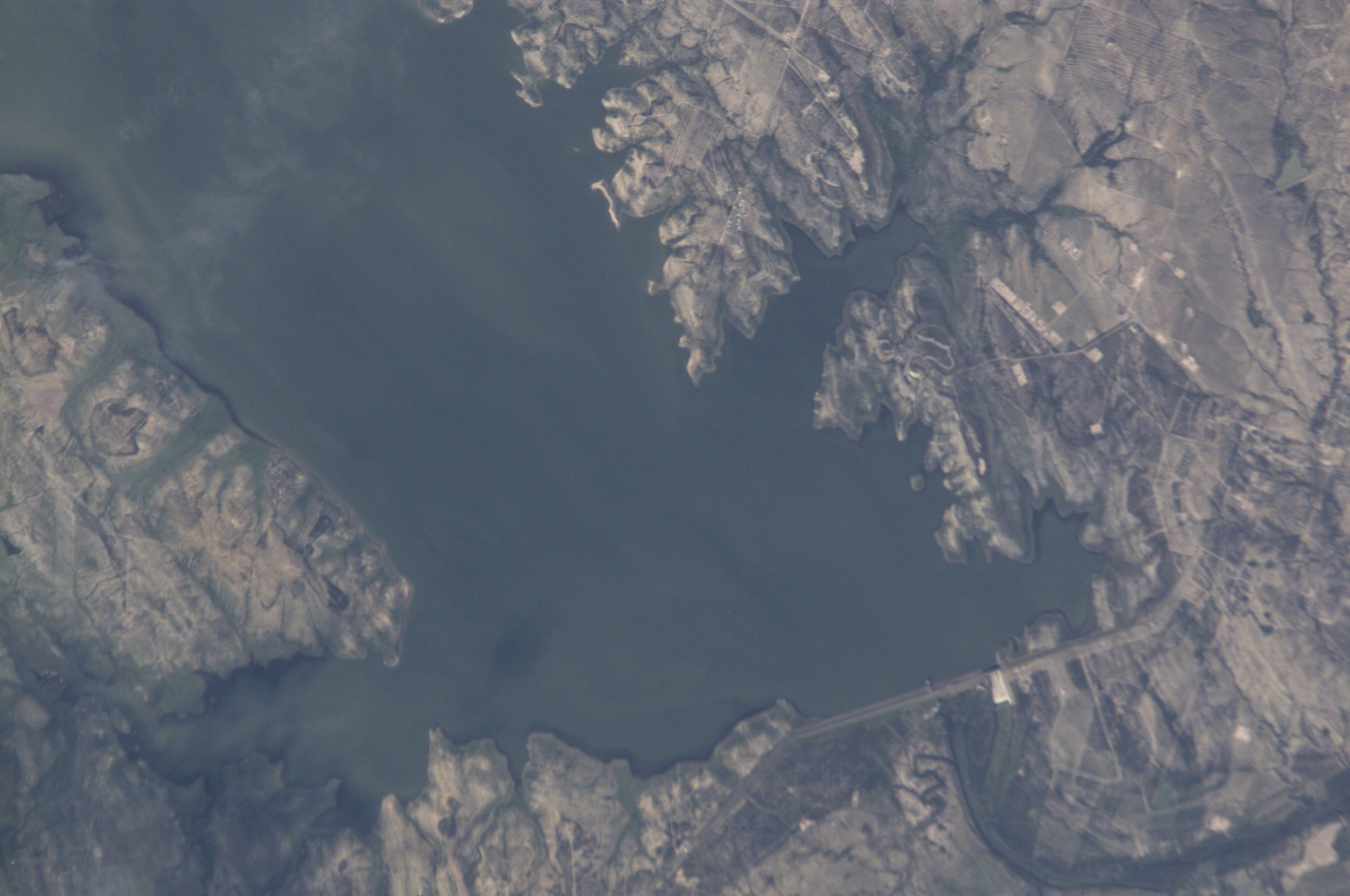

- Location within Texas Location within the United States
- Location: Zapata / Starr Counties, Texas, United States; Nueva Ciudad Guerrero, Tamaulipas, Mexico
- Coordinates: 26°33′32″N 99°09′53″W at Falcon Dam
- Type: Hydroelectric reservoir
- Primary inflows: Rio Grande
- Primary outflows: Rio Grande
- Basin countries: United States, Mexico
- Surface area: 83,654 acres (33,854 ha)
- Max. depth: 110 ft (34 m)
- Surface elevation: 301 ft (92 m)

Falcon International Reservoir (Spanish: Embalse Internacional Falcón), commonly called Falcon Lake, is a reservoir on the Rio Grande 40 miles (64 km) southeast of Laredo, Texas, United States, and Nuevo Laredo, Tamaulipas, Mexico. The huge lake is bounded by Starr and Zapata Counties on the Texas side of the international border and the municipality and city of Nueva Ciudad Guerrero on the Tamaulipas side. The reservoir was formed by the construction of the Falcon Dam to provide water conservation, irrigation, flood control, and hydroelectricity to the area.

The dam was dedicated in October 1953 by Mexican President Adolfo Ruiz Cortines and U.S. President Dwight D. Eisenhower. The dam and lake are managed jointly by governments of the United States and Mexico through the International Boundary and Water Commission, which was established in 1889 to maintain the border, allocate river waters between the two nations, and provide for flood control and water sanitation. The lake is named after María Rita de la Garza Falcón, for whom the town of Falcon (displaced by the creation of the reservoir) was named.

== Fish and plant life ==
Falcon International Reservoir has been stocked with species of fish intended to improve the utility of the reservoir for recreational fishing. Fish present in the reservoir include largemouth bass, crappie, catfish, and channel catfish.

On the shores of Falcon Lake are Texas wild olive (Cordia boissieri), Mexican oregano (Lippia graveolens), hibiscus, mesquite thickets, huisache (Vachellia farnesiana var. farnesiana) and prickly pear cactus (Opuntia spp.). Greater roadrunners, collared peccaries, white-tailed deer, and black-tailed jackrabbits also exist within the park.

== Recreation ==
Falcon State Park is 572.6 acres (2.317 km^{2}) located between Falcon Heights, Texas, and Nueva Ciudad Guerrero, Tamaulipas, and is the southern end of a 98,960-acre (400.5 km^{2}) International Falcon Reservoir. The park's main activities include camping, swimming, fishing, water skiing, and boating, with a self-guided nature trail. Bass fishing is particularly popular on the lake.

== Climate ==
Climate data is recorded near the southeast corner of the reservoir at 26.5580°N 99.1372°W and an elevation of 97.5 metres (320 ft).

Climate data for Falcon Dam, Texas, 1991–2020 normals, extremes 1962–present
Month	Jan	Feb	Mar	Apr	May	Jun	Jul	Aug	Sep	Oct	Nov	Dec	Year
Record high °F (°C)	99 (37)	107 (42)	108 (42)	113 (45)	116 (47)	116 (47)	110 (43)	111 (44)	112 (44)	105 (41)	99 (37)	94 (34)	116 (47)
Mean maximum °F (°C)	88.4 (31.3)	92.9 (33.8)	97.9 (36.6)	102.1 (38.9)	104.7 (40.4)	107.0 (41.7)	106.4 (41.3)	106.9 (41.6)	103.3 (39.6)	98.0 (36.7)	92.8 (33.8)	87.7 (30.9)	109.6 (43.1)
Mean daily maximum °F (°C)	71.5 (21.9)	77.1 (25.1)	84.0 (28.9)	90.8 (32.7)	96.5 (35.8)	101.2 (38.4)	102.2 (39.0)	102.6 (39.2)	95.8 (35.4)	89.9 (32.2)	80.1 (26.7)	72.2 (22.3)	88.7 (31.5)
Daily mean °F (°C)	60.1 (15.6)	64.9 (18.3)	71.5 (21.9)	77.8 (25.4)	84.1 (28.9)	88.5 (31.4)	89.4 (31.9)	89.6 (32.0)	84.6 (29.2)	78.0 (25.6)	69.0 (20.6)	61.2 (16.2)	76.6 (24.8)
Mean daily minimum °F (°C)	48.7 (9.3)	52.7 (11.5)	59.0 (15.0)	64.8 (18.2)	71.6 (22.0)	75.8 (24.3)	76.6 (24.8)	76.7 (24.8)	73.4 (23.0)	66.0 (18.9)	57.9 (14.4)	50.2 (10.1)	64.5 (18.0)
Mean minimum °F (°C)	32.8 (0.4)	37.0 (2.8)	40.8 (4.9)	48.5 (9.2)	58.6 (14.8)	67.1 (19.5)	69.4 (20.8)	70.5 (21.4)	62.8 (17.1)	48.1 (8.9)	39.7 (4.3)	33.7 (0.9)	30.2 (−1.0)
Record low °F (°C)	15 (−9)	19 (−7)	27 (−3)	30 (−1)	44 (7)	59 (15)	59 (15)	64 (18)	51 (11)	31 (−1)	31 (−1)	15 (−9)	15 (−9)
Average precipitation inches (mm)	0.74 (19)	0.64 (16)	0.78 (20)	1.24 (31)	1.98 (50)	1.94 (49)	1.99 (51)	1.63 (41)	4.87 (124)	1.38 (35)	1.31 (33)	1.00 (25)	19.50 (495)
Average precipitation days (≥ 0.01 in)	5.2	4.3	4.2	3.4	4.3	3.6	3.7	3.5	7.3	3.9	4.3	6.1	53.8
Source 1: NOAA
Source 2: National Weather Service

== Piracy ==
In May 2010, Los Zetas pirates on the lake claiming to be Mexican Federal Police committed at least three armed robberies. The pirates boarded U.S. boats and demanded either weapons, drugs, or money.

In June 2010, U.S. authorities also revealed a plot by Los Zetas to destroy the Falcon Dam.

On September 30, 2010, David Hartley and his wife Tiffany, from McAllen, Texas, were in Mexican waters riding WaveRunners back from Mexico when they were allegedly chased by two boats containing about six gunmen. The Zapata County Sheriff said the woman escaped and reported that her husband was shot. He is missing and feared dead.

On October 10, 2010, Zapata County Sheriff Sigifredo Gonzalez sent word to the Zetas that he has no plans to prosecute.

On October 12, 2010, Commander Rolando Flores, the lead Mexican investigator for the David Hartley disappearance case, was beheaded by Mexican drug cartel members and sent in a suitcase to the Mexican military.

The lake remains a popular fishing destination, and regularly hosts U.S. anglers and tournaments.

== See also ==
- Amistad Reservoir
