= San Juan River (Tamaulipas) =

Rio San Juan Río San Juan
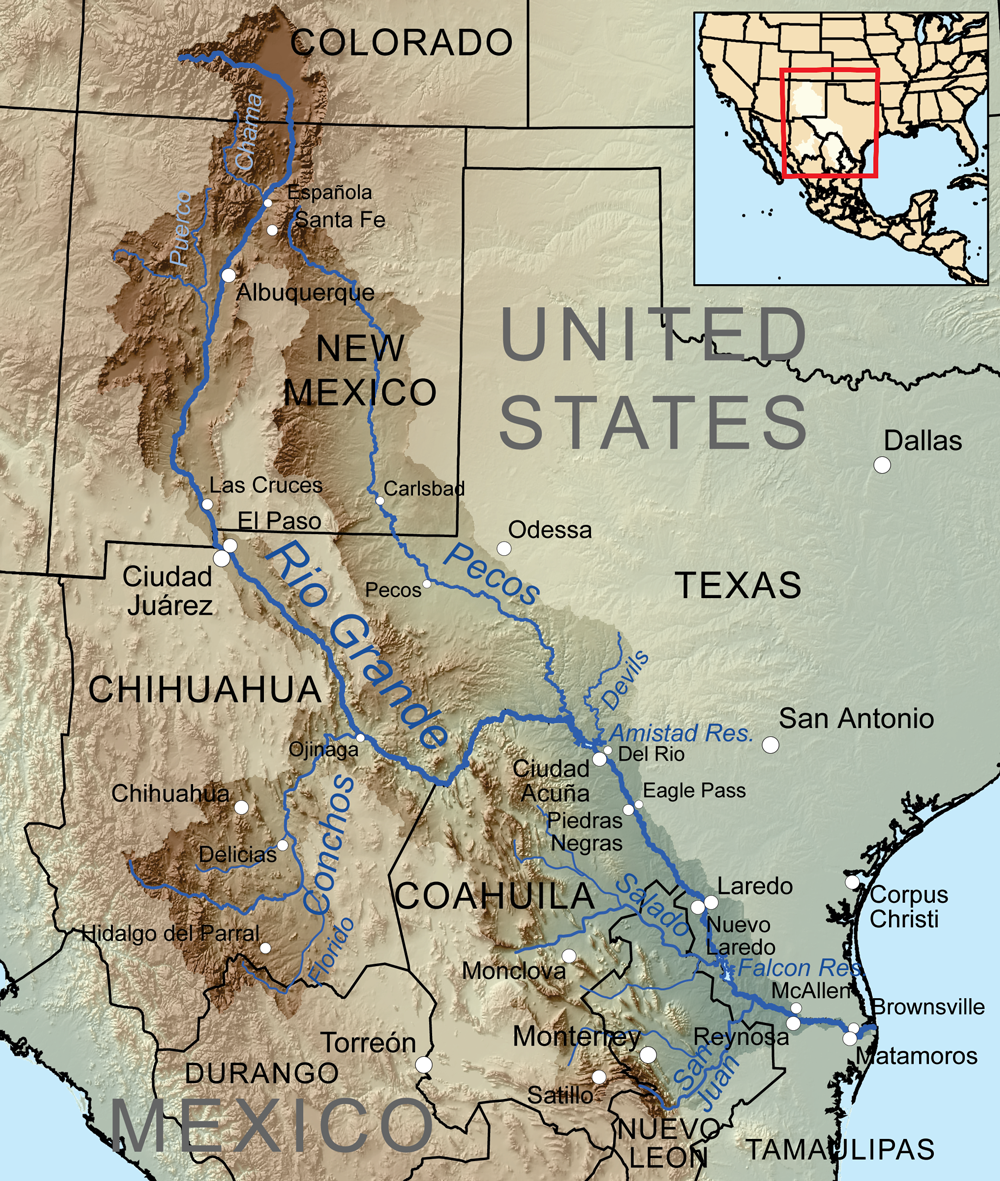

Location
- Country: Mexico
- State: Coahuila, Nuevo León, Tamaulipas

Physical characteristics
- Source: Coahuila
- Mouth: Rio Grande
  - location: near Camargo, Tamaulipas
  - coordinates: 26°21′55″N 98°51′15″W
- Basin size: 33,538 km^{2} (12,949 sq mi)
- Discharge
  - location: IBWC station 08-4642.00, near Camargo
  - average: 10.4 m^{3}/s (370 cu ft/s)
  - minimum: 0 m^{3}/s (0 cu ft/s)
  - maximum: 3,250 m^{3}/s (115,000 cu ft/s)

The San Juan River is the largest and most important river in the Mexican state of Nuevo León. The river feeds the El Cuchillo Dam, which provides the city of Monterrey with water. The San Juan River basin has a total surface area of 33,538 square kilometres (12,949 sq mi). The San Juan River is a tributary to the Rio Grande (Rio Bravo) — which is the fourth largest river basin in North America. It begins in Coahuila, flows through Nuevo León and into Tamaulipas, where it finally joins the Rio Grande near Camargo, Tamaulipas.

== See also ==
- List of rivers of Mexico
- List of tributaries of the Rio Grande
- San Juan River (Colorado River)
