= Falcon Dam =

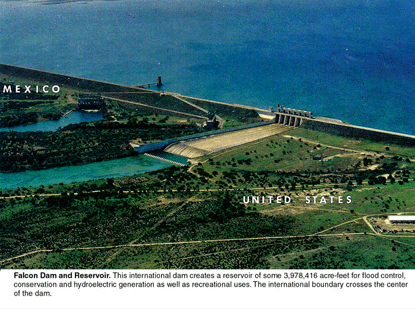
- Falcon Dam

- Location within Mexico
- Location: Starr County, Texas, USA / Guerrero Municipality, Tamaulipas, Mexico
- Coordinates: 26°33′32″N 99°09′53″W
- Construction began: 1950
- Opening date: 1954
- Construction cost: $35 million (U.S. Share)

Dam and spillways
- Impounds: Rio Grande
- Height: 150 ft (46 m)
- Length: 26,294 ft (8,014 m)
- Width (base): 35 ft (11 m) (Crest)

Reservoir
- Creates: Falcon International Reservoir
- Total capacity: 2,645,646 acre⋅ft (3.263356×10^{9} m^{3})
- Surface area: 87,400 acres (354 km^{2})

Power Station
- Turbines: 6 x 10.5 MW Francis
- Installed capacity: 63 MW
- Website https://www.cbp.gov/contact/ports/romafalcon-dam

Falcon Dam (Spanish: Presa Falcón) is an earthen embankment dam on the Rio Grande between Falcon Heights in Starr County, Texas and the city of Nueva Ciudad Guerrero in the Mexican state of Tamaulipas. The dam was built for water conservation, irrigation, hydroelectric power generation, flood control, and recreational purposes and as an international border crossing between Zapata and Starr Counties and Tamaulipas. Construction on the dam began in December 1950 and ended in April 1954, but it was dedicated by Mexican President Adolfo Ruiz Cortines and U.S. President Dwight D. Eisenhower in October 1953.

The dam is also known as "Puente San Juan", "Presa Falcón" and "Bordo Internacional de la Presa".

== Construction ==
The Falcon Dam was authorized by the Treaty relating to the utilization of waters of the Colorado and Tijuana Rivers and of the Rio Grande or Water Treaty of 1944 between Mexico and the United States. Construction on the dam began on 15 December 1950, and the reservoir began to fill on 25 August 1953. The dam was dedicated on 19 October 1953, and work was officially complete on 8 April 1954. By October 1954, the dam's hydroelectric power station began to produce electricity.

== Characteristics ==
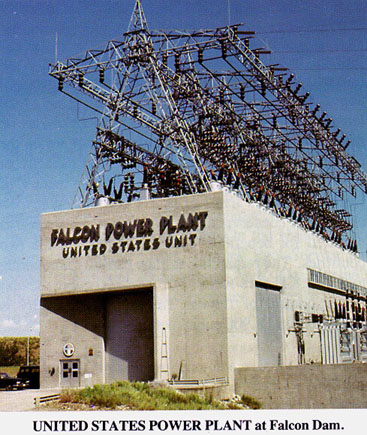
The U.S. Power Station

The Falcon Dam is a 150 ft (46 m) high and 26,294 ft (8,014 m) long earthen embankment dam made of 12,600,000 yd^{3} (9,633,391 m^{3}) of earthen fill, 282,000 yd^{3} (215,604 m^{3}) of concrete, and 10,300 short tons (9,344 t) of reinforced steel. The center of the dam is over-topped with a 1,300 ft (396 m) long spillway with widths ranging from 350 ft (107 m) at the top to 600 ft (183 m) at the bottom. The spillway is controlled by six 50 ft × 50 ft (15 m × 15 m) fixed-wheel gates and can release up to 456,000 cu ft/s (12,912 m^{3}/s) downstream.

The Falcon Dam supplies water to two different hydroelectric power plants, one on the Mexican side and another on the U.S. side. Each power plant contains three 10.5 MW Francis turbine generators for a combined total of 63 MW. Each power plant also receives water from the reservoir via four 13 ft (4 m) diameter penstocks. The two extra penstocks are for an additional generator if needed.

The Falcon Dam created the Falcon International Reservoir that has a volume of 2,645,646 acre⋅ft (3.263356×10^{9} m^{3}) and a surface area of 87,400 acres (354 km^{2}).

== Border crossing ==
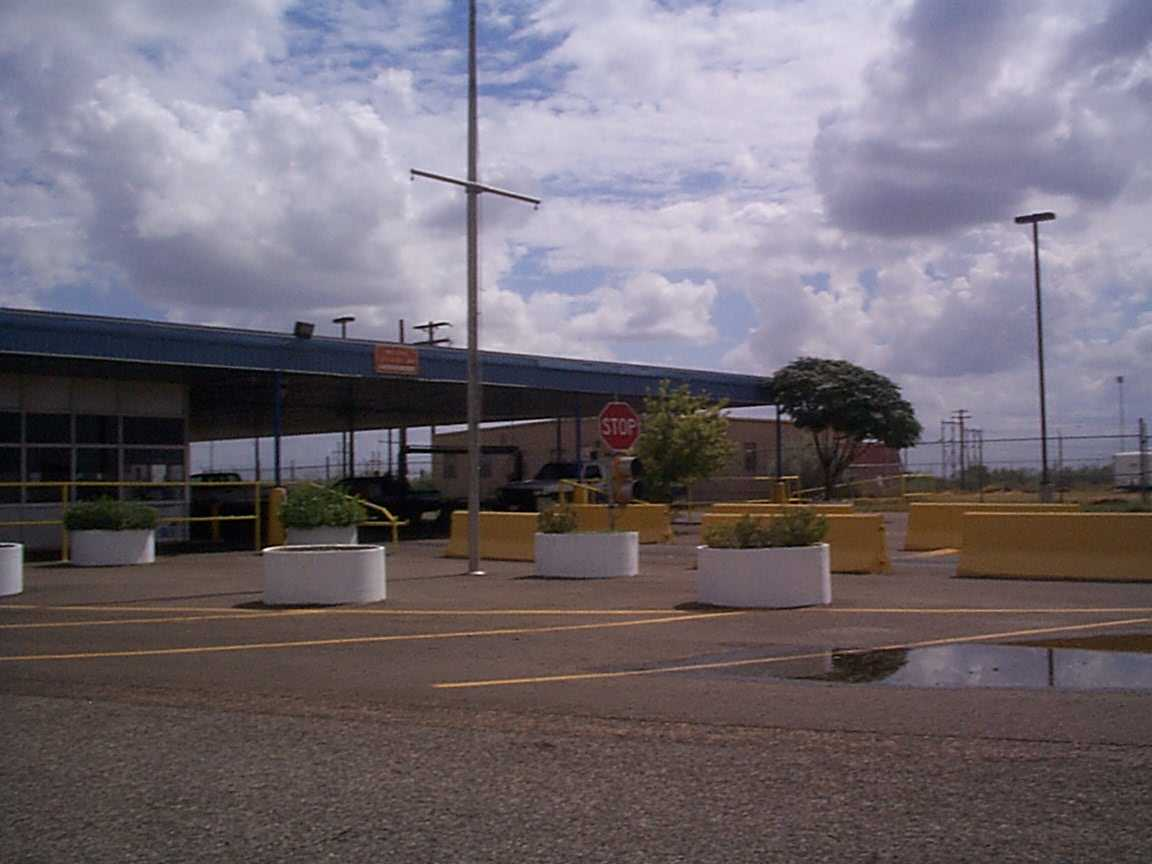
Falcon dam port of entry

The Falcon Dam Port of Entry is a port of entry at the Falcon Dam to the United States on the Mexican border. It is essentially a replacement for the former Zapata Port of Entry, which was situated at a bridge in the town of Zapata, Texas. When the dam was completed, the town was moved to higher ground, and the Zapata Bridge now lies at the bottom of Falcon Lake.

The border crossing is owned by the United States Government and the Mexican Government. The dam has a two-lane roadway. The border facilities were completed in 1960. The region is known to be dangerous and the border crossing closes at 8:45pm CST. The Falcon Dam Port of Entry is essentially a replacement for the former Zapata Port of Entry, which was situated at a bridge in the town of Zapata, Texas. When the dam was completed, the town was moved to higher ground, and the Zapata Bridge now lies at the bottom of Falcon Lake.

== Safety study ==
A five-year safety study of dams along the U.S. - Mexico border, which includes Falcon Dam, done at the behest of the International Boundary and Water Commission "yielded urgent and high-priority deficiencies at five of the six dams." The study for the IBWC was conducted by Joint Technical Advisors, which includes the United States Army Corps of Engineers.

== 2010 plot ==
In June 2010, U.S. authorities revealed that the Los Zetas drug cartel had planned to destroy the Falcon Dam to terrorize the rival Gulf Cartel, which smuggles drugs in the area. Small amounts of dynamite discovered near the dam and a copy of a warning helped alert authorities. A larger U.S. and Mexican security presence in the area may have thwarted the attack that Los Zetas had reportedly warned civilians about on the Mexican side of the border.
