= International Boundary and Water Commission =

US-Mexico border commission

International Boundary and Water Commission Comisión Internacional de Límites y Aguas
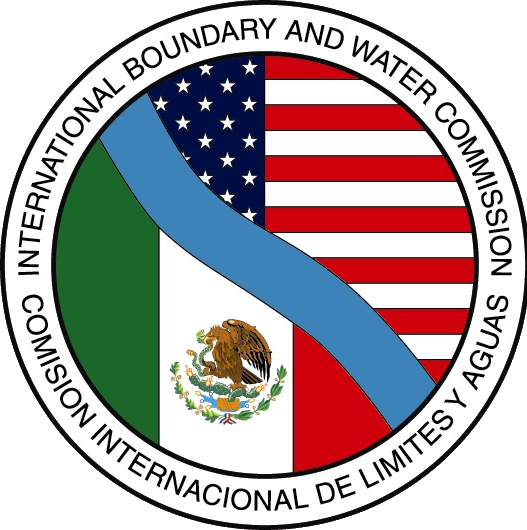
- Abbreviation: IBWC; CILA
- Formation: March 1, 1889; 137 years ago
- Legal status: Active
- Headquarters: El Paso, Texas, U.S. Ciudad Juárez, Chihuahua, Mexico
- Official languages: English and Spanish
- Commissioner (US section): William Charles "Chad" McIntosh
- Commissioner (Mexican section): Adriana Reséndez Maldonado

The International Boundary and Water Commission (IBWC, Spanish: Comisión Internacional de Límites y Aguas, CILA) is the international organization that applies the rules for determining the location of the international boundary between the United States and Mexico, as established under the Convention of November 12, 1884.

The IBWC was created in 1889 as the International Boundary Commission by the Convention of 1889 between the United States and Mexico, and it was given its present name under a 1944 treaty. Under these agreements, the IBWC has a US section (headquartered in El Paso, Texas) and a Mexican section (headquartered in Ciudad Juárez, Chihuahua). The U.S. section is administered by the Department of State, while the Mexican part by the Secretariat of Foreign Relations.

== Administration ==
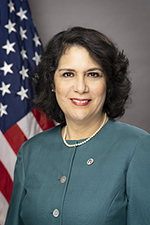
Maria-Elena Giner was appointed U.S. Commissioner of the International Boundary and Water Commission by President Joe Biden in August 2021

Some of the rights and obligations administered by the IBWC include:

- Distribution between the two countries of the waters of the Rio Grande and of the Colorado River
- Regulation and conservation of the waters of the Rio Grande for their use by the two countries by joint construction, operation, and maintenance of international storage dams and reservoirs and plants for generating hydroelectric energy at the dams
- Protection of lands along the river from floods by levee and floodway projects
- Solution of border sanitation and other border water quality problems
- Preservation of the Rio Grande and Colorado River as the international boundary
- Demarcation of the land boundary

The U.S. and Mexican commissioners meet at least weekly, alternating the place of meetings, and are in almost daily contact with one another. Each section maintains its own engineering staff, a secretary, and such legal advisers and other assistants as it deems necessary.

== The border and water treaties ==
=== Treaty of Guadalupe Hidalgo ===
The Treaty of Guadalupe Hidalgo of 2 February 1848 fixed the international boundary between El Paso–Ciudad Juárez and the Gulf of Mexico. The Gadsden Purchase Treaty of 30 December 1853 extended the southern boundary of New Mexico and Arizona southwards to enable the United States to construct a railroad to the west coast along a southern route and to resolve a question arising from the 1848 Treaty as to the location of the southern boundary of New Mexico. Temporary commissions were formed by these boundary treaties to perform the first joint mission of the governments of the United States and Mexico, which was to survey and demarcate the boundary on the ground in accordance with the treaties. Another temporary commission was created by the 1852 Boundary Convention (29 July), which surveyed and increased the number of monuments marking the land boundary westward from El Paso and Ciudad Juárez. As settlements sprang up along the boundary rivers and the adjoining lands began to be developed for agriculture in the late 19th century, questions arose as to the location of the boundary when the rivers changed their course and transferred tracts of land from one side of the river to the other. The two governments, under the 1884 Border Convention (12 November), adopted certain rules designed to deal with such questions.

=== 1889 Border Convention ===
By the 1889 Border Convention (1 March), the two governments created the International Boundary Commission (IBC), to consist of a United States section and a Mexican section. The IBC was charged with the application of the rules of the 1884 Convention, for the settlement of questions arising as to the location of the boundary when the rivers changed their course. That convention was modified by the Banco Convention of 20 March 1905 to retain the Rio Grande and the Colorado River as the boundary.

=== 1906 Boundary Waters Convention ===
The 1906 Boundary Waters Convention (21 May) provided for the distribution between the United States and Mexico of the waters of the Rio Grande above Fort Quitman, Texas, for the 143-km (89-mile) international boundary reach of the Rio Grande through the El Paso–Juárez Valley. This convention allotted to Mexico 60,000 acre-feet (74,000,000 m^{3}) annually of the waters of the Rio Grande to be delivered in accordance with a monthly schedule at the headgate to Mexico's Acequia Madre just above Ciudad Juárez. To facilitate such deliveries, the United States constructed, at its expense, the Elephant Butte Dike in its territory. The convention includes the proviso that in case of extraordinary drought or serious accident to the irrigation system in the United States, the amount of water delivered to the Mexican canal shall be diminished in the same proportion as the water delivered to lands under the irrigation system in the United States downstream of Elephant Butte Dike.

Comparison of the 86-mile-long rectified channel of the Rio Grande (grey-blue) with overlay of previous 155-mile-long natural channel (black) based on maps from 1891, 1905, and 1907 surveys. (© OpenStreetMap contributors)

=== 1933 Border Convention ===
In the 1933 Border Convention (1 February), the two governments agreed to jointly construct, operate, and maintain, through the IBC, the Rio Grande Rectification Project, which straightened and stabilized the 249-km (155-mile) river boundary through the highly developed El Paso–Juárez Valley. The project further provided for the control of the river's floods through this valley. Numerous parcels of land (174) were transferred between the two countries during the construction period, 1935 – 1938. At the end, each nation had ceded an equal area of land (2,560.5 acres (1,036.2 ha)) to the other.

=== 1944 Water Treaty ===
The Water Treaty of 3 February 1944 distributed between the two countries the waters of the Rio Grande from Fort Quitman to the Gulf of Mexico, and the waters of the Colorado River. Of the waters of the Rio Grande, the treaty allocates to Mexico:

- All of the waters reaching the main channel of the Rio Grande from the San Juan and Alamo Rivers, including the return flows from the lands irrigated from those two rivers
- Two-thirds of the flow in the main channel of the Rio Grande from the measured Rio Conchos, Rio San Diego, Rio San Rodrigo, Rio Escondido, and Rio Salado, and the Arroyo de las Vacas, subject to certain provisions
- One-half of all other flows occurring in the main channel of the Rio Grande downstream from Fort Quitman

The treaty allocates to the United States:

- All of the waters reaching the main channel of the Rio Grande from the Pecos and Devils Rivers, Goodenough Spring, and Alamito, Terlingua, San Felipe and Pinto Creeks.
- One-third of the flow reaching the main channel of the river from the six named measured tributaries from Mexico, and provides that this third shall not be less, as an average amount in cycles of five consecutive years, than 350,000 acre-feet (430,000,000 m^{3}) annually
- One-half of all other flows occurring in the main channel of the Rio Grande downstream from Fort Quitman

The 1944 treaty further provided for the two governments to jointly construct, operate, and maintain on the main channel of the Rio Grande the dams required for the conservation, storage, and regulation of the greatest quantity of the annual flow of the river to enable each country to make optimum use of its allotted waters. The treaty also provides that of the waters of the Colorado River, Mexico is to receive:

- A guaranteed annual quantity of 1,500,000 acre-feet (1.9 km^{3}) to be delivered in accordance with schedules formulated in advance by Mexico within specified limitations
- Any other waters arriving at the Mexican points of diversion under certain understandings

To enable diversion of Mexico's allotted waters, the treaty provided for the construction by Mexico of a main diversion structure in the Colorado River, below the point where the California–Baja California land boundary line intersects the river. It also provided for the construction at Mexico's expense of such works as may be needed in the United States to protect its lands from such floods and seepage as might result from the construction and operation of the diversion structure.

In the 1944 treaty, the two governments agreed to give preferential attention to the solution of all border sanitation problems. This treaty entrusts the IBWC (the renamed International Boundary Commission of the 1889 Convention) with the application of its terms, the regulation and exercise of the rights and obligations which the two governments assumed thereunder, and the settlement of all disputes to which its observance and execution may give rise. The treaty also provides that the IBWC study, investigate, and report to the governments on such hydroelectric facilities as the IBWC finds should be built at the international storage dams and on such flood control works, other than those specified in the treaty, that the IBWC finds should be built on the boundary rivers, the estimated cost thereof, the part to be built by each government, and to be operated and maintained by each through its section of the IBWC.

Under the terms of the 1944 treaty, the two governments reached agreement for the solution of the international problem of the salinity of the Lower Colorado River (30 August 1973), and the IBWC submitted and the two governments approved "Recommendations for the Solution of the Border Sanitation Problems" (24 September 1979).

There has long been tension between the two countries over the quality of Colorado River waters flowing to Mexico, including the salinity of irrigation waters discharged into the river at the southern boundary. In 1970, Mexican President Luis Echeverria threatened to bring the salinity dispute to the International Court of Justice. After intense negotiations, the matter was settled by delsalinization works pursuant to Minute 242, International Boundary and Water Commission, United States and Mexico, TIAS 7708 (1973).

=== Chamizal Convention ===
The Chamizal Convention of 29 August 1963 resolved the nearly 100-year-old boundary problem at El Paso and Ciudad Juárez. Known as the Chamizal dispute, this involved some 630 acres (250 ha) of territory that were transferred from the south to the north bank of the Rio Grande by movement of the river during the latter part of the 19th century. By this convention, the two governments gave effect to a 1911 arbitration award under 1963 conditions. The convention provided for the relocation by the IBWC of the 7 km (4.4 miles) of the channel of the Rio Grande so as to transfer a net amount of 176.92 ha (437.18 acres) from the north to the south side of the river. U.S. President Lyndon Johnson met Mexican President Adolfo López Mateos in El Paso on 24 September 1964 to commemorate the ratification of the Chamizal Convention.

=== 1970 Boundary Treaty ===
The 1970 Boundary Treaty (23 November) resolved all pending boundary differences and provided for maintaining the Rio Grande and the Colorado River as the international boundary. The Rio Grande was re-established as the boundary throughout its 2,019-km (1,254 mile) limitrophe section. The treaty includes provisions for restoring and preserving the character of the Rio Grande as the international boundary where that character has been lost, to minimize changes in the channel, and to resolve problems of sovereignty that might arise due to future changes in the channel of the Rio Grande. It provides for procedures designed to avoid the loss of territory by either country incident to future changes in the river's course due to causes other than lateral movement, incident to eroding one of its banks and depositing alluvium on the opposite bank. This treaty, too, charged the IBWC with carrying out its provisions.

The Boundary Treaty of 1970 transferred 823 acres (333 ha) of Mexican territory to the U.S., in areas near Presidio and Hidalgo, Texas, to build flood-control channels. In exchange, the U.S. ceded 2,177 acres (8.81 km^{2}) to Mexico, including five parcels near Presidio, the Horcon Tract containing the little town of Rio Rico, Texas, and Beaver Island near Roma, Texas. The last of these transfers occurred in 1977.

On November 24, 2009, the U.S. ceded six islands in the Rio Grande to Mexico, totaling 107.81 acres (0.4363 km^{2}). At the same time, Mexico ceded three islands and two cuts to the U.S., totaling 63.53 acres (25.71 ha). This transfer, which had been pending for 20 years, was the first application of Article III of the 1970 Boundary Treaty. In recent years, the IBWC has been criticized as an institutional anachronism, bypassed by modern social, environmental, and political issues. The U.S. section has been described as secretive, beholden to special interests, and indifferent to environmental problems. The State Department has attempted to distance itself from responsibility for the U.S. section, even disclaiming jurisdiction, notwithstanding numerous statutes to the contrary. Critics, including the agency's employees, say poor leadership has led to deteriorating levees, dams, and water-treatment facilities.

== Dams ==
The IBWC operates the American Dam at the corner of Texas, New Mexico, and Mexico.

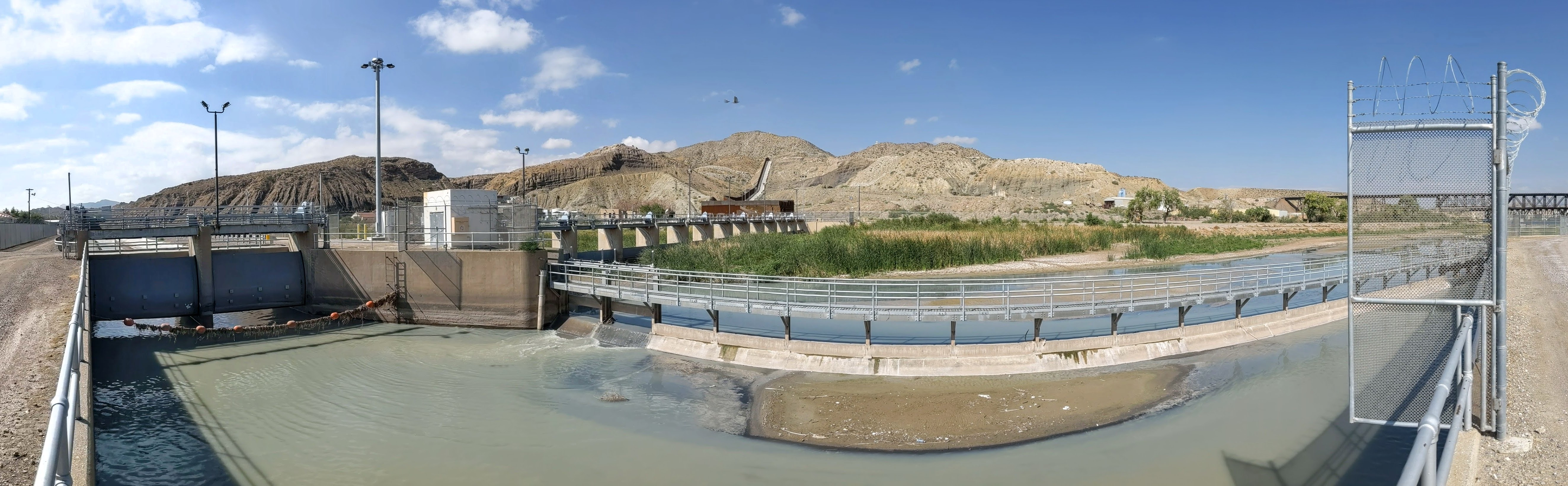
Panoramic view of the American Dam and Canal, with mountains of Mexico (left) and New Mexico (right) in the background. The dam and diversion weirs are in the center; canal at left; railroad bridges over the Rio Grande upstream at right; private border wall and cross on Mount Cristo Rey in center background.

== See also ==
- Title 22 of the Code of Federal Regulations
- International Boundary Wastewater Treatment Plant developed by the IBWC
- U.S.-Mexico border for a detailed treatment of the various conventions and treaties overseen by the IBWC
- Colorado River Compact
- Falcon International Reservoir
- Amistad Reservoir
- New River (California) U.S.-Mexico river, reported as most polluted in North America

== Sources ==
- This article incorporates public domain material from Official site. International Boundary and Water Commission.
- Robert J. McCarthy, Executive Authority, Adaptive Treaty Interpretation, and the International Boundary and Water Commission, U.S.-Mexico, 14-2 U. Denv. Water L. Rev. 197(Spring 2011) (also available for free download at https://ssrn.com/abstract=1839903).
