= San Antonio–San Diego Mail Line =

Stagecoach and mail operation

The San Antonio–San Diego Mail Line, also known as the Jackass Mail, was the earliest overland stagecoach and mail operation from the Eastern United States to California, in operation between 1857 and 1861. It was created, organized and financed by James E. Birch the head of the California Stage Company. Birch was awarded the first contract for overland service on the "Southern Route", designated Route 8076. This contract required a semi-monthly service in four-horse coaches, scheduled to leave San Antonio and San Diego on the ninth and the 24th of each month, with 30 days allowed for each trip.

== Foundation ==
Birch envisioned that at New Orleans, one could take a five-times-a-week mail steamer to 540 mi (870 km) to Indianola, Texas. There one transferred to a daily line of four-horse mail coaches traveling 140 mi (230 km) to San Antonio, Texas. Then one would take the San Antonio and San Diego Line 1,476 mi (2,375 km) from San Antonio via the San Antonio-El Paso Road and then continue north to Mesilla and take the Southern Emigrant Trail from there to San Diego. Once on the Pacific Coast the passenger could board a California Steam Navigation Company vessel to San Francisco.

To accomplish this Birch entered a partnership with George H. Giddings, of the San Antonio-El Paso Mail that already ran over half of the route to La Mesilla. 87 watering places and stage stations were organized by Superintendent Isaiah C. Woods, formerly of Adams & Company of California in San Francisco. On the first mail run, they were setting up the line as the mule trains and coaches journeyed west from San Antonio. Superintendent Woods prepared a self-contained outfit for this journey across the unsettled country of Texas, New Mexico Territory and Southern California with almost no existing infrastructure. The vehicles used were celerity wagons or mud wagons, also called ambulances (which was the military use for the same type of vehicle at that time), rather than the better known Concord stagecoach.

== Stations, water stops and camping places ==
Water holes were set up at 30 mi (48 km) intervals but many were unmanned and actual stations sometimes were separated by as much as 100 mi (160 km). These first stations were at most a brush corral and a jacal to house the keeper, while most were merely camping places at springs or stream crossings; camps would be made where the coaches stopped for the night. Only the three at San Antonio, El Paso and San Diego had substantial buildings. The largest and most important station between El Paso and San Diego was at Maricopa Wells, Arizona, the dividing point on the route, where the eastbound and westbound mails met and turned back. Here was erected an adobe house and corral. During the company's existence it employed 65 men in all capacities, and owned 50 coaches and 400 mules.

=== Table of distances from one station or watering-place to another from starting point ===
(Stations in bold)

- **San Antonio** to Leon river, 6.53 mi (10.51 km)
- Leon river to Castroville, on the Medina River, 18 mi (29 km)
- Castroville to D'Hanis Seco River, 25.28 mi (40.68 km)
- D'Hanis to Ranchero creek, 8.38 mi (13.49 km)
- Ranchero creek to Sabinal creek, 3.94 mi (6.34 km)
- Sabinal creek to Camanche creek, 5 mi (8.0 km)
- Camanche creek to Rio Frio, 8.46 mi (13.62 km)
- Rio Frio to Head of Leona River, "Uvalde", 6.08 mi (9.78 km)
- Uvalde to Nueces River, 9.04 mi (14.55 km)
- Nueces to Turkey Creek, 10.27 mi (16.53 km)
- Turkey Creek to Elm Creek, 15.23 mi (24.51 km)
- Elm Creek to Las Moras River, **Fort Clarke**, 7.13 mi (11.47 km) / 123.34 mi (198.50 km)

---

- **Fort Clarke** to Piedra Pinto, 7 mi (11 km)
- Piedra Pinto to Maverick Creek, 8.86 mi (14.26 km)
- Maverick Creek to San Felipe Springs, 12.61 mi (20.29 km)
- San Felipe to first crossing of San Pedro or Devil's River, 10.22 mi (16.45 km)
- First Crossing to Painted Caves, 2.54 mi (4.09 km)
- Painted Caves to California Spring, 15.73 mi (25.31 km)
- California Spring to Willow Spring, 2 mi (3.2 km)
- Willow Spring to **Fort Hudson**, and second crossing Pedro or Devil's River, 16.39 mi (26.38 km) / 75.35 mi (121.26 km)

---

- **Fort Hudson** to Head of San Pedro or Devil's River, 19.5 mi (31.4 km)
- Head of river to Howard Springs, 44 mi (71 km)
- Howard Springs to Live Oak Creek, 30.44 mi (48.99 km)
- Live Oak creek to **Fort Lancaster**, 3 mi (4.8 km) / 96.94 mi (156.01 km)

---

- **Fort Lancaster** to Pecos Crossing, 4.29 mi (6.90 km)
- Pecos Crossing to Pecos Spring, 6 mi (9.7 km)
- Pecos Spring to Leaving of Pecos, 32.26 mi (51.92 km)
- Leaving of Pecos to Arroyo Escondido, 16.26 mi (26.17 km)
- Arroyo Escondido to Escondido Spring, 8.58 mi (13.81 km)
- Escondido Spring to Comanche Springs, 19.4 mi (31.2 km)
- Comanche Spring to Leon Hole, 8.88 mi (14.29 km)
- Leon Hole to Hackberry Pond, 11 mi (18 km)
- Hackberry pond to Limpia Creek, 32 mi (51 km)
- Limpia creek to **Fort Davis**, 18.86 mi (30.35 km) / 157.99 mi (254.26 km)

---

- **Fort Davis** to Point of Rocks, 10 mi (16 km)
- Point of Rocks to Barrel Springs, 8.42 mi (13.55 km)
- Barrel Springs to Deadman's Hole, 13.58 mi (21.85 km)
- Deadman's Hole to Van Horn's Wells, 32.83 mi (52.83 km)
- Van Horn's Wells to Eagle Springs, 19.74 mi (31.77 km)
- Eagle Springs to First camp on Rio Grande, 31.42 mi (50.57 km)
- First camp on Rio Grande to **Birchville**, 35 mi (56 km) / 150.99 mi (242.99 km)

---

- **Birchville** to San Eleazario, 24.8 mi (39.9 km)
- San Eleazario to Socorro, 5.45 mi (8.77 km)
- Socorro to Isletta, 3.1 mi (5.0 km)
- Isletta to **El Paso**, 14.14 mi (22.76 km) / 47.49 mi (76.43 km)

---

- **El Paso** to Cottonwood, 22 mi (35 km)
- Cottonwood to Fort Fillmore, 22 mi (35 km)
- Fort Fillmore to **La Mesilla**, 6 mi (9.7 km) / 50 mi (80 km)

---

- **La Mesilla** to Cook's Spring, 65 mi (105 km)
- Cook's Spring to Rio Mimbres, 18 mi (29 km)
- Rio Mimbres to Ojo La Vaca, 17 mi (27 km)
- Ojo La Vaca to Ojo de Ynez, 10 mi (16 km)
- Ojo de Ynez to Peloncilla, 34 mi (55 km)
- Peloncilla to Rio Saur or San Domingo, 18 mi (29 km)
- Rio Saur to Apache Springs, 23 mi (37 km)
- Apache Springs to Dos Cabesas Springs, 9 mi (14 km)
- Dos Cabesas Springs to Dragoon Springs, 26 mi (42 km)
- Dragoon Springs to mouth of Quercos canon, 18 mi (29 km)
- Mouth of Quercos canon to San Pedro crossing, 6 mi (9.7 km)
- San Pedro to Cienega, 20 mi (32 km)
- Cienega to Cienega Creek, 13 mi (21 km)
- Cienega Creek to Mission San Xavier, 20 mi (32 km)
- Mission San Xavier to **Tucson**, 8 mi (13 km) / 305 mi (491 km)

---

- **Tucson** to Pico Chico mountain, 35 mi (56 km)
- Pico Chico to First camp on Gila River, 35 mi (56 km)
- First camp on Gila to **Maricopa Wells**, 29 mi (47 km) / 99 mi (159 km)

---

- **Maricopa Wells** to Tezotal, across Jornada, 40 mi (64 km)
- Tezotal to Ten-mile camp, 10 mi (16 km)
- Ten-mile camp to Murderer's Grave, 8 mi (13 km)
- Murderer's Grave to Oatman's Flat, 1st crossing of Gila, 15 mi (24 km)
- Oatman's Flat to 2nd crossing of Gila, 25 mi (40 km)
- 2nd crossing of Gila to Peterman's Station, 32 mi (51 km)
- Peterman's station to Antelope Peak, 20 mi (32 km)
- Antelope Peak to Little Corral, 24 mi (39 km)
- Little Corral to **Fort Yuma**, 16 mi (26 km) / 190 mi (310 km)

---

- **Fort Yuma** to Pilot Knob, 7 mi (11 km)
- Pilot Knob to Cook's Wells, 13 mi (21 km)
- Cook's Wells to Alamo Mucho, 21.94 mi (35.31 km)
- Alamo Mucho to Indian Wells, 20.94 mi (33.70 km)
- Indian Wells to **Carissa creek**, 32.24 mi (51.89 km) / 95.12 mi (153.08 km)

---

- **Carissa creek** to Vallecito, 18 mi (29 km)
- Vallecito to Lassator's ranch, 18 mi (29 km)
- Lassator's ranch to Julian's ranch, 7 mi (11 km)
- Julian's ranch to Williams' ranch, 7 mi (11 km)
- Williams' ranch to Ames' ranch, 14 mi (23 km)
- Ames' ranch to Mission San Diego, 16 mi (26 km)
- Mission to **San Diego**, 5 mi (8.0 km) / 85 mi (137 km)

---

- San Antonio to San Diego total, 1,475.76 mi (2,375.01 km)

=== Stagecoach Road from Carrizo Creek Station to San Diego ===
- **Carrizo Creek Station** to Vallecito, 18 mi (29 km)
- Vallecito to Rancho Valle de San Felipe, 18 mi (29 km)
- Rancho Valle de San Felipe to Warner's Ranch, 10 mi (16 km)
- Warners Ranch to San Ysabel, 24 mi (39 km)
- San Ysabel to San Pasqual, 28 mi (45 km)
- San Pasqual to Rancho Santa Maria de Los Peñasquitos, 16 mi (26 km)
- Rancho Peñasquitos to **San Diego**, 20 mi (32 km). 125 mi (201 km) total distance

== Record of the San Antonio-to-San Diego route ==
On July 9, 1857, 17 days after Birch concluded his contract, the first mail left San Antonio and was carried on horseback, arriving at San Diego from San Antonio in 53 days. The second mail, which left San Antonio July 24, was sent by coach and arrived in San Diego 38 days later. The average rate of travel over the route was about 40 mi (64 km) a day.

Following the death of Birch at sea before the first mail reached its destination, his contract was transferred to George H. Giddings and R. E. Doyle. Woods was retained as superintendent with company headquarters in New York. Only about 40 trips were ever made over the entire route before the service was curtailed.

== Supplanted by the Butterfield Overland Mail ==
On September 20, 1858, the Butterfield Overland Mail Company began operating their stageline over the road, and using the station sites pioneered by Birch and Woods from El Paso, Texas, to Warner's Ranch, California. The San Antonio–San Diego Line was not absorbed by the Butterfield line but on December 1, 1858, the portion of the route between El Paso and Fort Yuma was cut from the service because it duplicated the service of the Butterfield Overland. The service from San Antonio to El Paso and from Fort Yuma to San Diego was upgraded from semi-monthly to weekly trips and its subsidy was increased.

During 1860, the west end of the route from Fort Yuma to San Diego was ended, leaving nothing but the 367 mi (591 km) portion from San Antonio to Camp Stockton which was put on a weekly basis. Between Camp Stockton and El Paso it was put on a weekly basis. The service was thus improved to a weekly basis all the way from New Orleans to San Francisco.

== Overland Mail Corporation ==
After the final suspension of the Butterfield Overland mail, March 12, 1861, the San Antonio and San Diego Mail Line reorganized and merged its interests under the title of the Overland Mail Corporation. In May 1861, this company was given a new contract for the year ending June 30, 1862, to operate a mail service over the entire route from San Antonio via Camp Stockton, to Tucson and points in California. An attempt was made to fulfil the contract, beginning April 1, but with the development of the Civil War, and Apache attacks on the stations and coaches of the line resulting from the Bascom Affair, the contractors were compelled to give up. The eastern portion of the line was curtailed June 30, 1861. The end came when the Camp Stockton to Tucson part of the line was discontinued August 2, 1861.
