= Historic trails and roads in the United States =

There are many historic trails and roads in the United States which were important to the settlement and development of the United States including those used by American Indians.

The lists below include only those routes in use prior to the creation of the American Highway System in 1926. Many more local routes are discussed at entries for the relevant town.

== Settlement routes ==
- Albany Post Road, in use by 1642, from Bowling Green to Albany, New York; called "Broadway" for long stretches
- Bozeman Trail from Virginia City, Montana, to central Wyoming
- California Road established 1849, from Fort Smith, Arkansas, to California
- California Trail from Missouri to California.
- Carolina Road from Roanoke, Virginia, on the Great Wagon Road through the Piedmont to Augusta, Georgia.
- Cherokee Trail along the Arkansas River from the Indian Territory to Wyoming.
- Coushatta-Nacogdoches Trace (or Natchitoches)
- El Camino Real (California), from Mission San Diego de Alcalá in San Diego to Mission San Francisco Solano in Sonoma
- El Camino Real de Tierra Adentro
- El Camino Viejo
- Farm Highway completed 1696, from Boston Post Road Stratford, Connecticut, to Nichols, Connecticut.
- Federal Road (Cherokee lands) from Athens, Georgia to Chattanooga and Knoxville, Tennessee
- Federal Road (Creek lands) from Fort Wilkinson (close to Milledgeville, Georgia, to Fort Stoddert (close to Mobile, Alabama)
- Forbes Road established 1759, from Fort Pitt, Pennsylvania to Fort Bedford, Pennsylvania
- Gaines Trace in the Mississippi Territory from near Muscle Shoals, Alabama, on the Tennessee River to Cotton Gin Port, Mississippi, on the upper Tombigbee River and on to Fort Stoddert on the lower Tombigbee
- Great Wagon Road (Pennsylvania Wagon Road) from Pennsylvania to Georgia
- Jackson's Military Road from Nashville, Tennessee to New Orleans, Louisiana
- Memphis to Little Rock Road, from Memphis, Tennessee, to Little Rock, Arkansas
- Mormon Trail
- Mullan Road from Fort Benton, Montana, to Walla Walla, Washington
- Natchez Trace
- National Road (Cumberland Road), from Cumberland, Maryland, to Vandalia, Illinois
- Oregon Trail
- Old Spanish Trail from Santa Fe, Nuevo México, to Alta California.
- Old Wire Road, from St. Louis, Missouri, to Fort Smith, Arkansas
- San Antonio-El Paso Road, from San Antonio to El Paso in Texas.
- Santa Fe Trail
- Siskiyou Trail
- Southern Emigrant Trail
- Southwest Trail, from St. Louis, Missouri, to Texarkana, Texas
- Stockton - Los Angeles Road, from Stockton to Los Angeles in California
- Territorial Road of Michigan, from Detroit west to St. Joseph and Lake Michigan
- Wilderness Road (Wilderness Trail) scouted by Daniel Boone from the Shenandoah Valley through the Cumberland Gap to the Ohio River

== Indian routes ==
- Catawba Path
- Coushatta Trace
- Coushatta-Nacogdoches Trace
- Great Warrior Road
- Natchitoches Trace, from Missouri River's mouth to Natchitoches, Louisiana
- Nemacolin's Path
- St. Joseph Indian Trail, Michigan
- Tuscarora Path
- Kittanning Path from Frankstown, Pennsylvania, through the Alleghenys to Kittanning, Pennsylvania
- Vincennes Trace

== Mail and passenger routes ==
- Boston Post Road or King's Highway First ride to lay out Post Road January 1, 1673.
- San Antonio-San Diego Mail Line (1857–1861) San Antonio, Texas to San Diego, California
- Butterfield Overland Stage Route (1858–1861) St. Louis, Missouri, to San Francisco, California
- Pony Express Route (1860–1862) Saint Joseph, Missouri, to Sacramento, California
- Central Overland Route (1861–1869)

== Gaps and passes ==
- Apache Pass
- Cumberland Gap
- Cooke's Pass, Massacre Canyon
- Dead Mans Pass
- Delaware Water Gap
- Donner Pass
- Glorieta Pass
- King's Highway (Charleston to Boston)
- Kittanning Gap
- Lemhi Pass
- Lolo Pass
- Monida Pass
- Raton Pass
- South Pass
- Warner Pass

== Cattle trails ==
- Abilene Trail
- Chisholm Trail
- Goodnight-Loving Trail
- Texas Road (Shawnee Trail)

== Early motor routes ==
The Good Roads Movement established in May 1860 agitated for better roads for bicyclists. At the turn of the 20th century, interest in the bicycle began to wane in the face of increasing interest in automobiles. In 1913 the Lincoln Highway Association was formed to plan and promote and sign a highway suitable for automobiles using existing roads from Times Square in New York City to San Francisco, California. This was a success and was followed by the development of named auto trails throughout North America. Most of these were subsequently converted to numbered highways.

== See also ==
- National Historic Trail
- U.S. Route 66
- Potawatomi Trail of Death
- State wildlife trails (United States)
- Trail of Tears
- Turnpike
