= Pecos Spring =

Spring in Texas, USA

Coordinates: 30°42′02″N 101°48′32″W

Pecos Spring is a spring, 1.1 miles (3 km) northeast of Sheffield, in Pecos County, Texas. It lies at an elevation of 2060 feet. Pecos Spring was emitted from the Edwards and associated limestones of the Edwards-Trinity (Plateau) aquifer. On March 7, 1924, it discharged 0.7 cubic feet per second but by August 17, 1943, that had been reduced to 0.5 cubic feet per second. By 1961, its flow had ceased.

== History ==
Cabeza de Vaca probably passed the spring in 1534. Comanche used this spring as a campsite. Later it became a regular stop on the Old Spanish Trail from San Antonio to El Paso. Pecos Spring was 32.26 miles, south of Leaving of Pecos and 6 miles northwest of the Pecos Crossing of the Devils River on the San Antonio-El Paso Road. It was the last good water for travelers from the east on the road up the dry, barren, west bank of the brackish Pecos River before the road reached the Arroyo Escondido, 48.52 miles away.
