= Persimmon (disambiguation) =

A persimmon is the edible fruit of a number of species of trees in the genus Diospyros.

Persimmon may also refer to:

- Persimmon (color), a shade of orange
- Persimmon plc, a British housebuilding company
- Persimmon (horse), a Thoroughbred race horse who won the Epsom Derby in 1896
- Persimmon, Georgia, a community in the United States
- Miss Persimmon, a fictional character in the film Mary Poppins

== See also ==
- Persimmon Gap, a mountain pass in Texas, US
- Persimmon Mound, a historic site near Rockledge, FL
