= Comanche Springs (Texas) =

Aquifer in Texas

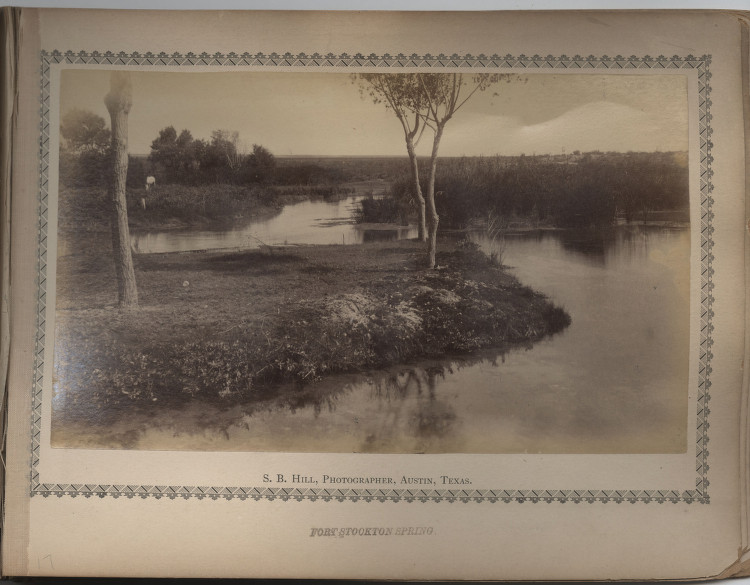

- Location within Texas Location within the United States
- Interactive map of Comanche Springs
- Name origin: Awache (Wide Water)
- Location: Fort Stockton, Pecos County, Texas
- Coordinates: 30°52′54″N 102°52′44″W
- Spring source: Edwards Aquifer
- Elevation: 2,940 feet (896.1 m)
- Type: Artesian aquifer
- Provides water for: Rio Grande

Comanche Springs was an aquifer of six artesian springs geographically located between the Edwards Plateau and the Trans-Pecos regions of West Texas. The military fortification Camp Stockton was built around the springs, eventually growing to become the city of Fort Stockton.

The groundwater source originated from a Comanchean limestone fault combined within the bountiful Edwards Aquifer and the Glass Mountains. The natural spring has a physical geography routing north through Comanche Creek forming a confluence with Leon Creek and the Pecos River. The alluvial river is a tributary to the Rio Grande.

== History ==
=== Rio Grandé and Spanish expeditions ===
Comanche Springs served as an oasis with inhabitants dating to the Pre-Columbian era by the Jumano Indians. Álvar Núñez Cabeza de Vaca scouted the Rio Grande region in 1536. Fernando del Bosque explored the Rio Grandé area for Franciscans missionary districts in 1675 while Juan Domínguez de Mendoza lodged near the spring waters in the late 17th century.

=== Forts and west frontier ===
On March 23, 1859, the Camp Stockton fortification was established in the Trans-Pecos region. The garrison served as cantonment for the United States Cavalry warding off Plains Indians seeking to disrupt and raid the American pioneer, Butterfield Overland Mail, Concord stagecoach, covered wagon, Old San Antonio Road, Old Spanish Trail, San Antonio-El Paso Road, San Antonio–San Diego Mail Line, and wagon trains.

=== Nomadic culture of Plains Indians ===
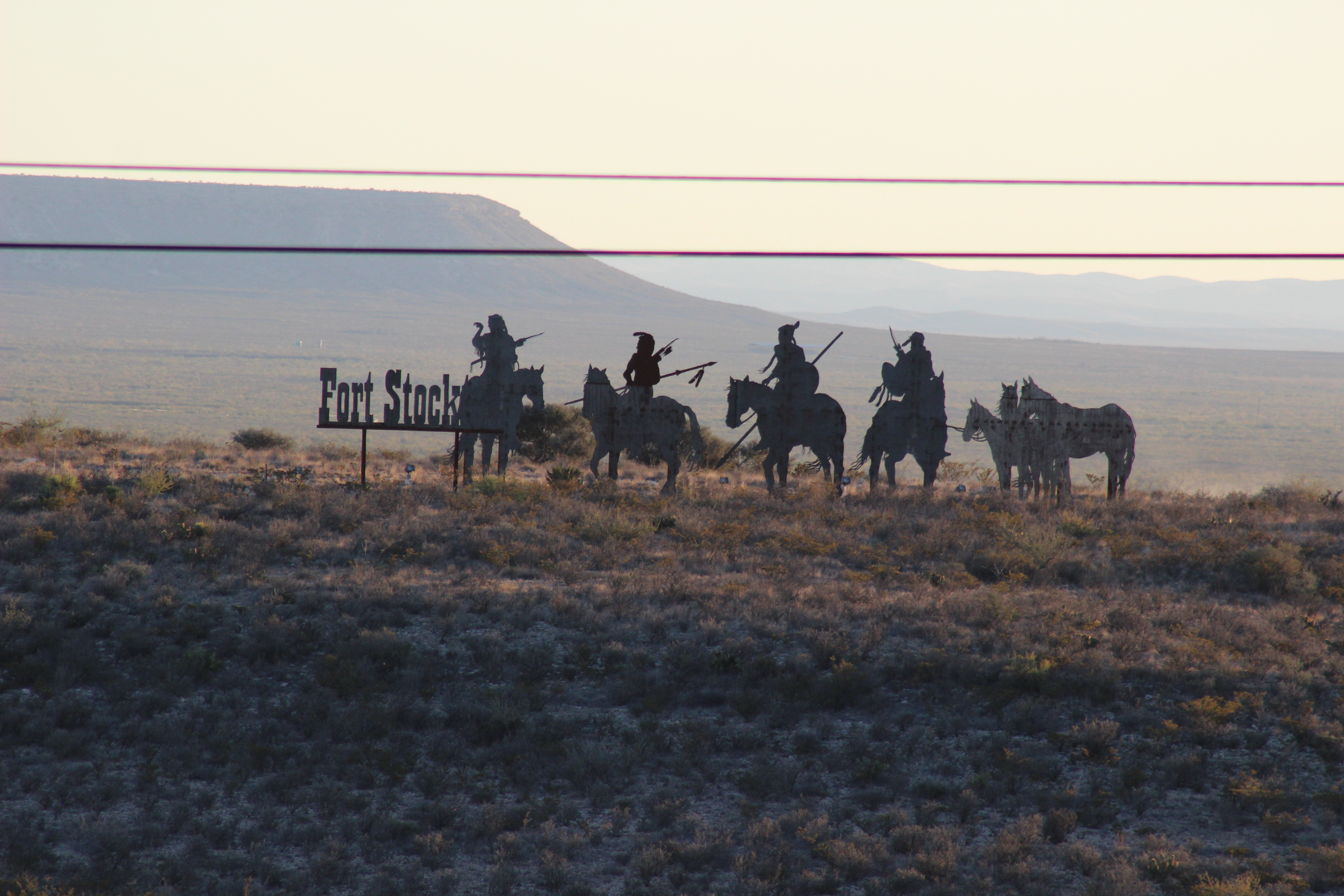
Silhouette Sculpture on Trans-Pecos Plains

The Apache, Comanche, and Kiowa visited the water basin frequently during bison and Colonial Spanish horse hunts, Comanche-Mexico War skirmishes, and Mexican Indian Wars in Northern Mexico. The Comanche Trail permitted the nomadic migration of Native Americans to the West Texas desert climate during the Northern Hemisphere winter solstice. The long-distance trail encompassed regional spring waters of Texas Big Bend Country given the horseback riding distance from the Staked Plains to Big Spring, Horsehead Crossing, Tunas Springs, Glenn Springs, San Vicente, Las Moras Springs, and Rio Grandé located within Big Bend National Park.

== Irrigation of arid lands ==
Beginning in 1875, Comanche Springs was incorporated into an agricultural irrigation district resulting in the hydrological regression of the natural springs in the Chihuahuan Desert domain. The Belding territory, located 11 miles (18 km) southwest of Comanche Springs, was a thriving agricultural development requiring voluminous water reserves. The 6,000 acres (2,400 ha) to 7,000 acres (2,800 ha) irrigation demand lead to the overdrafting of the natural springs aquifer diminishing the Trans-Pecos water table.

== U.S. federal laws for arid lands irrigation ==
U.S. Congressional legislation for irrigation of the State of Texas arid lands.

Date of Enactment	Public Law Number	U.S. Statute Citation	U.S. Legislative Bill	U.S. Presidential Administration
June 12, 1906	P.L. 59-225	34 Stat. 259	H.R. 14184	Theodore Roosevelt
August 11, 1916	P.L. 64-196	39 Stat. 506a	H.R. 12365	Woodrow Wilson
October 6, 1917	Public Resolution 65-14	40 Stat. 426	S.J.Res. 89	Woodrow Wilson
June 18, 1926	P.L. 69-404	44 Stat. 753	H.R. 3862	Calvin Coolidge
May 28, 1928	P.L. 70-556	45 Stat. 785	H.R. 11471	Calvin Coolidge
February 20, 1958	P.L. 85-333	72 Stat. 17	S.J.Res. 39	Dwight Eisenhower

== Case law of Texas Rio Grandé and Trans-Pecos ==
- Text of United States v. Rio Grande Dam & Irrigation Co., 174 U.S. 690, (Supreme Court of United States 1899) is available from: Internet Archive (docket files) Justia
- Text of United States v. Rio Grand Dam & Irrigation Co., 184 U.S. 416, (Supreme Court of United States 1902) is available from: Internet Archive (docket files) Justia
- Text of Rio Grande Dam & Irrigation Co. v. United States, 215 U.S. 266, (Supreme Court of United States 1909) is available from: Internet Archive (docket files) Justia
- Forest Reserve Act of 1891

== Historical record ==
Comanche Springs received a Texas historic marker in 1968.

== Illustrations ==
Texas Historical Markers at Comanche Springs
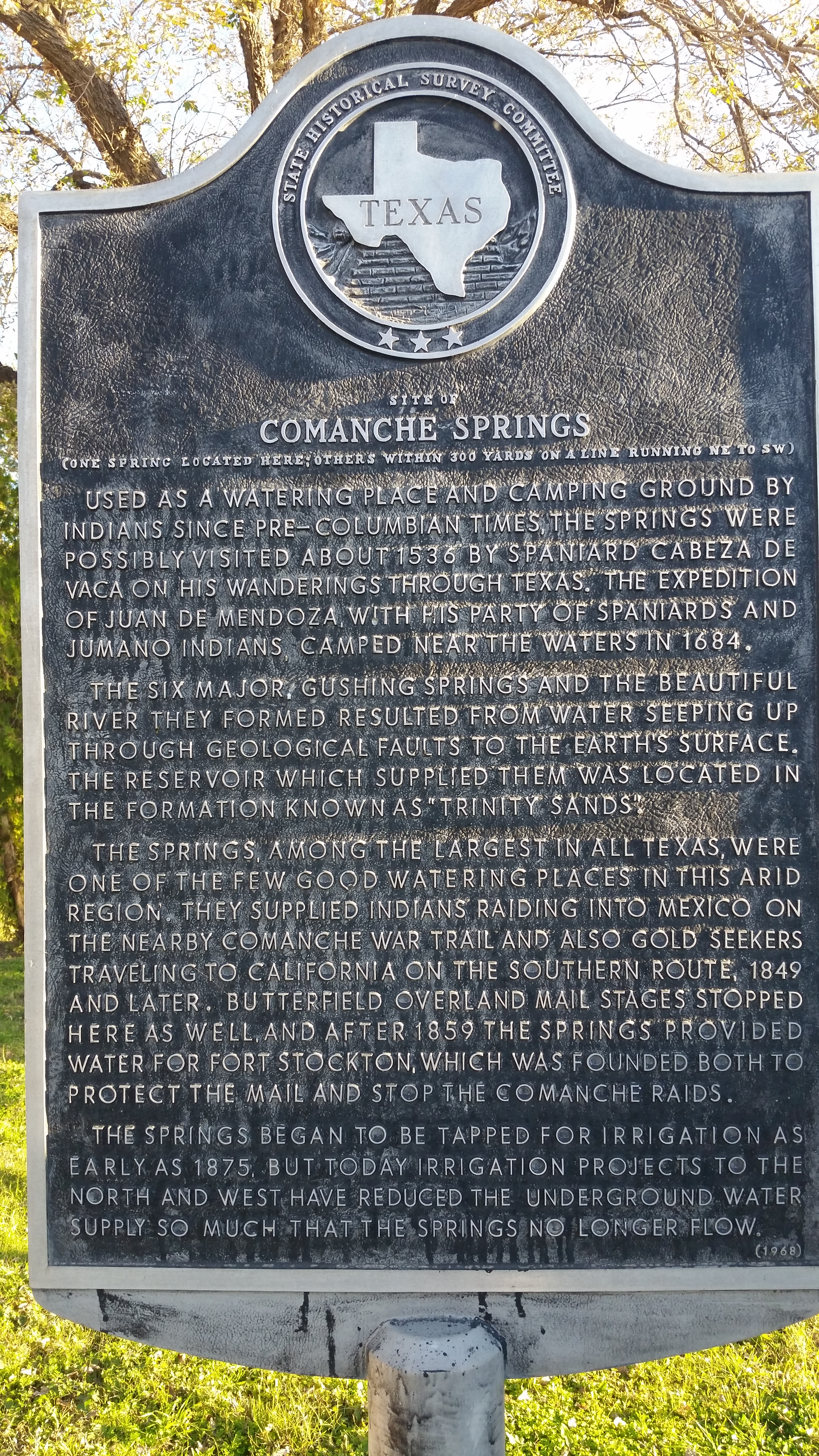
Comanche Springs historical marker established by Texas Historical Commission

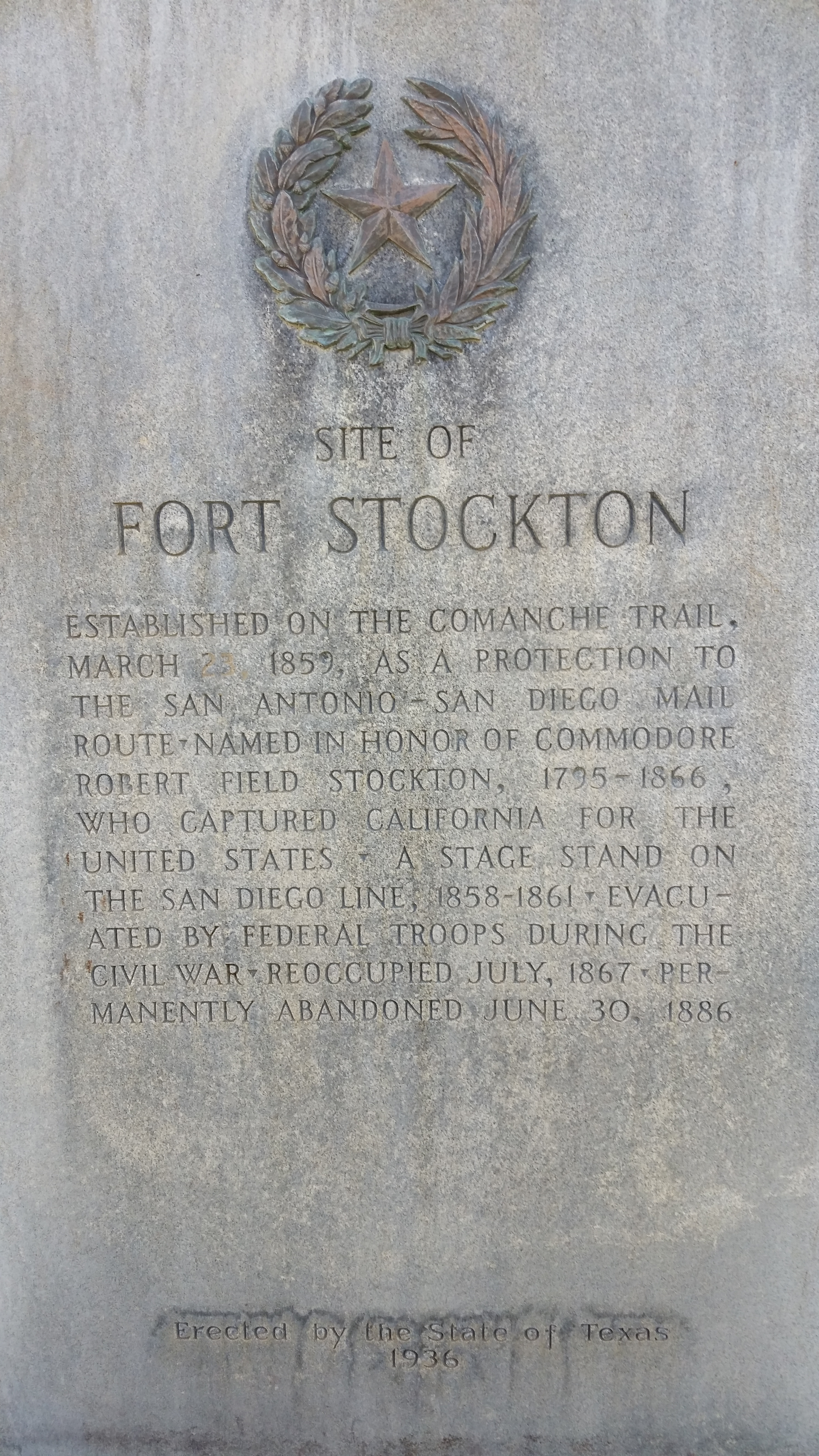
Fort Stockton historical marker established by Texas Historical Commission

== See also ==
Balcones Fault	Hydrology
Climate of Texas	Newlands Reclamation Act
Coahuiltecan	Rio Grande Project
Comanche Springs pupfish	Riparian zone
Comancheria	Salt Cedar
Desert climate	Spanish colonization of the Americas
Embudo Stream Gauging Station	Texas–Indian wars
Geography of Texas	United States Bureau of Reclamation
Groundwater recharge	Water cycle

== Historical video archive ==
- "Comanche Springs, Fort Stockton, Texas" on YouTube
- "Fort Stockton Comanche Springs" on YouTube
