= Pinto Creek (Texas) =

Pinto Creek, formerly known as Piedra Pinto Creek, a tributary to the Rio Grande in Kinney County, Texas. It has its source, at 29°30′53″N 100°24′13″W.

== History ==
The San Antonio-El Paso Road crossed Piedra Pinto Creek 7.0 miles (11.3 km) west of Fort Clarke. The crossing was 8.86 miles (14.26 km) east of Maverick Creek and 21.47 miles (34.55 km) east of San Felipe Springs. Teamsters, and other travelers and the San Antonio-El Paso Mail and San Antonio-San Diego Mail Line used this crossing as a water stop.

== See also ==
- List of rivers of Texas
