= Limpia Creek =

Stream in Jeff Davis and Pecos Counties, Texas

Limpia Creek, originally known as the Rio Limpia, is a stream that heads in Jeff Davis County, Texas, and its mouth is in Pecos County, Texas. Limpa is the Spanish word for "clear or clean water". The creek has its head in the Davis Mountains at an elevation of 7,160 feet, at location 30°38′27″N 104°09′42″W on the northeast slope of Mount Livermore. The creek flows 42 miles down Limpia Canyon past Fort Davis and Wild Rose Pass to the canyon mouth, where it turns eastward to its mouth at its confluence with Barrilla Draw, where it disappears into the ground at an elevation of 3,533 feet / 1,077 meters.

== History ==
Limpia Creek was a water and forage stop on the San Antonio-El Paso Road for freighters, and stage companies such as the San Antonio-San Diego Mail Line that had a stop at a camp 32 miles west of Hackberry Pond and 18.86 miles from Fort Davis. The Butterfield Overland Mail located its Limpia Station near the mouth Limpia Canyon 18 miles from Fort Davis, 10 miles west of Barela Springs Station farther down Limpia Creek.

== See also ==
- List of rivers of Texas
