= Limpia Canyon =

Texan valley

Coordinates: 30°46′39″N 103°44′40″W

- Floor elevation: 4,118 ft (1,255 m)
- Length: 26 mi (42 km)

Geography
- Location: Jeff Davis County, Texas, United States
- Mountain range: Davis Mountains
- Traversed by: Limpia Creek
- Interactive map of Limpia Canyon

Limpia Canyon is a deep valley or canyon in the Davis Mountains of Jeff Davis County, Texas.

It was cut by Limpia Creek and is its path southeastward from the northeastern slope of Mount Livermore, past Fort Davis and Wild Rose Pass, to its mouth at an elevation of 4,118 feet / 1,255 meters on the eastern edge of the Davis Mountains.

== History ==
Limpia Canyon was the route of the San Antonio-El Paso Road out of the Pecos River Valley into the Davis Mountains.
