= San Pedro Creek (Devils River tributary) =

River in Val Verde County, Texas, U.S.

- Map

Location
- Country: United States
- State: Texas
- County: Val Verde County

Physical characteristics
- Source
  - coordinates: 29°33′34″N 100°38′19″W

San Pedro Creek, a stream in Val Verde County, Texas, formerly a tributary of Devils River. It is now flows into the east side of Amistad Reservoir at an elevation of 1135 feet. San Pedro Creek has its source at 29°33′34″N 100°38′19″W.

The mouth of San Pedro Creek where it entered the Devils River, was at the place of the First Crossing of Devils River by the San Antonio-El Paso Road.

== See also ==
- List of rivers of Texas
