= Hudson Canyon (Texas) =

River in the United States of America

Location
- Country: United States

Physical characteristics
- Source
  - location: Val Verde County, Texas
  - elevation: 1,780 m (5,840 ft)
- Mouth
  - location: Devils River
  - elevation: 1,499 m (4,918 ft)

Hudson Canyon, is a valley and a tributary ephemeral stream of the Devils River in Val Verde County, Texas. It has its source at 29°57′03″N 101°10′38″W at an elevation of 1780 feet. Its mouth has its confluence with Devil's River a short distance below Bakers Crossing at 1499 feet.

== History ==
In the 19th century, the place near where the Devils River had its confluence with the creek at the mouth of Hudson Canyon was the location of Camp Hudson just south the second crossing of Devil's River by the San Antonio-El Paso Road. Camp Hudson and Hudson Canyon were named for 2nd Lieutenant Walter W. Hudson, an American soldier who died in the area on 19 April 1850 in fighting with local Native Americans.

== See also ==
- List of rivers of Texas
