= Sheffield, Texas =

Unincorporated community in Pecos County, Texas, United States

Coordinates: 30°41′26″N 101°49′21″W

Sheffield is a census-designated place in Pecos County, Texas, United States. According to the 2020 Census, the community had a population of 174. Named for pioneer rancher Will Sheffield, it has a post office with ZIP code of 79781.

== Geography ==
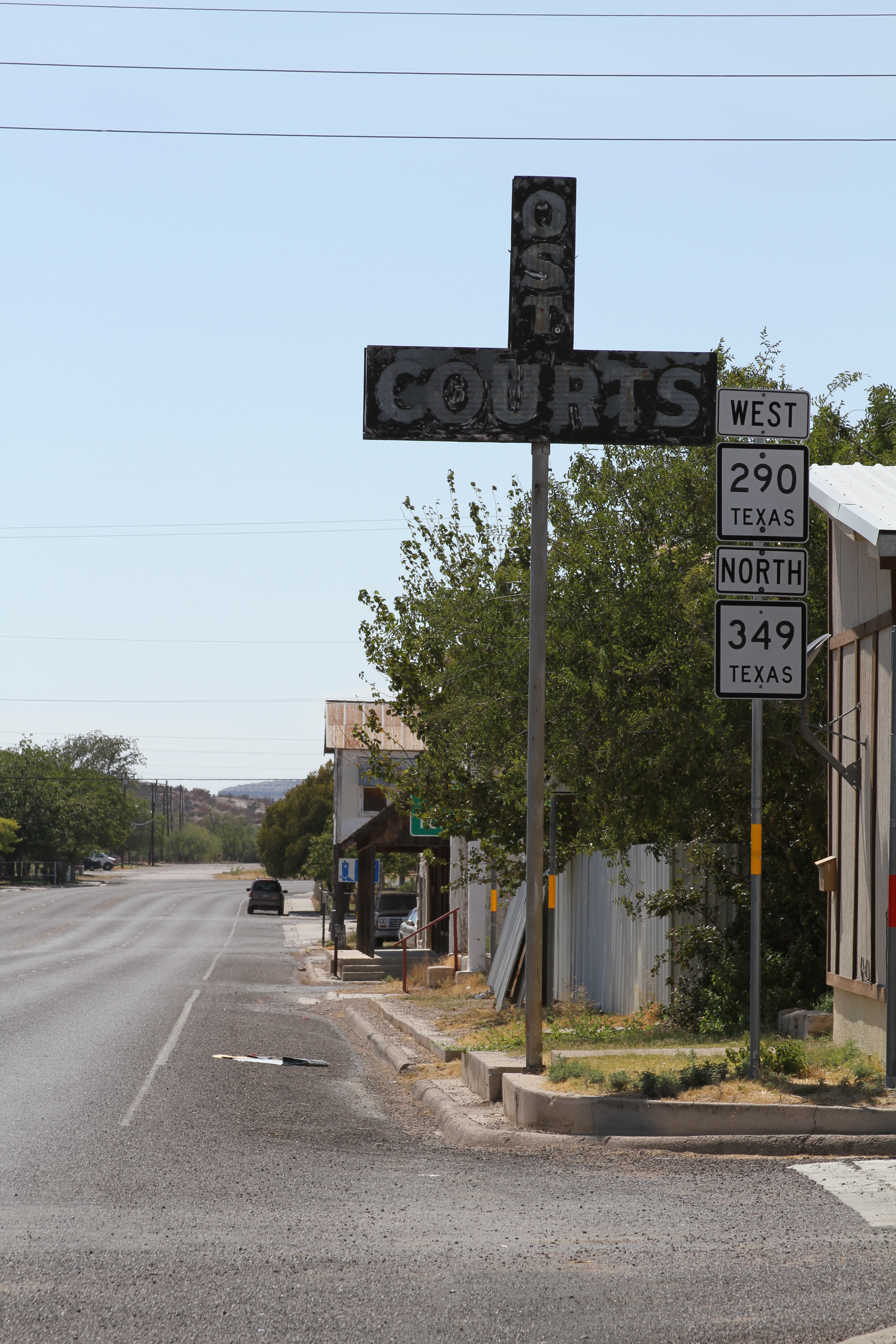
OST Courts along SH-290 / SH-349 in Sheffield, April 2011

Sheffield is located at the intersection of State Highway 290 (earlier a portion of U.S. Highway 290) and State Highway 349 (the portion south to Dryden formerly designated as FM 1217) on the eastern edge of Pecos County, about 18 miles south of Iraan and 40 miles west of Ozona.

In the 1920s, Sheffield became a small stop on the transcontinental route known as the Old Spanish Trail. One of the local motels there was the OST Courts. An old sign for this establishment, on Main Street near Avenue E, was still in place in 2023.

== History ==
The first documented Europeans to visit the area were Spanish explorer Gaspar Castaño de Sosa and his men, who traveled up the Pecos River in 1590. Although several Spanish-led expeditions followed, no permanent settlements were established in the area. In 1849, the Army surveyed the road from San Antonio to El Paso, and the route included what is now Sheffield because of the Pecos Spring and the Pecos Crossing or Lancaster Crossing, named for the nearby Fort Lancaster.

An early pioneer in the area, William Franklin Smith, herded sheep from the Sherwood area of Irion County to the Pecos River and camped at Pecos in the spring of 1886. Smith made several trips to Pecos County and eventually relocated permanently to Sheffield in 1912. The first settler was John Cannon, who arrived in 1888 and purchased a tract along the Pecos River. A post office was established in 1898, with Will Sheffield as its first postmaster. Around 1900, a small settlement sprang up on land adjoining the Cannon ranch owned by Mr. Sheffield, and the town became known as Sheffield. Most other settlers were ranchers who established their own homesteads. However, a few of the early pioneers were later reputed to be outlaws seeking refuge far from the reach of the law. Tom "Black Jack" Ketchum, later a notorious outlaw wanted in several states, was among these, spending time in the area in the 1890s.

The town prospered in the early 1900s as a supply point and social center for surrounding ranchers. Discovery of oil in the Trans-Pecos region during the 1920s, and natural gas later, radically altered the local economy. Sheffield grew slowly, from an estimated 124 inhabitants in 1925 to 350 by 1949. Although the community was bypassed by Interstate 10, Sheffield continued to support several stores and businesses throughout the latter half of the 20th century. In 2000, Sheffield was home to an estimated 600 inhabitants and 15 businesses.

Local resident Herbert A. Holmes (1900-1973) came to Sheffield with his family in 1906, and later served many years as a Pecos County justice of the peace. He collected facts, recollections, and photographs about the small community, and with his son J. Wayne Holmes, published these in 1973 as Frontier Days in Sheffield.

== Demographics ==
Historical population
Census	Pop.	Note	%±
2020	174		—
U.S. Decennial Census; 1850–1900 1910; 1920 1930 1940; 1950 1960 1970; 1980 1990 2000; 2010 2020

Sheffield first appeared as a census designated place in the 2020 U.S. census.

=== 2020 census ===
Sheffield CDP, Texas – Racial and ethnic composition Note: the US Census treats Hispanic/Latino as an ethnic category. This table excludes Latinos from the racial categories and assigns them to a separate category. Hispanics/Latinos may be of any race.
Race / Ethnicity (NH = Non-Hispanic)	Pop 2020	% 2020
White alone (NH)	93	53.45%
Black or African American alone (NH)	13	7.47%
Asian alone (NH)	3	1.72%
Multiracial (NH)	7	4.02%
Hispanic or Latino (any race)	58	33.33%
Total	174	100.00%

== Education ==
Public education in the community of Sheffield is provided by the Iraan-Sheffield Independent School District.
