= First Crossing of Devils River =

Point in Texas on the San Antonio-El Paso Road

Coordinates: 29°29′12″N 100°59′48″W

The First Crossing of Devils River was the first point at which the Devils River was crossed by the San Antonio-El Paso Road. It was located 10.22 miles west of San Felipe Springs at the mouth of San Pedro Creek on the Devils River. It was 2.54 miles southeast of Painted Caves, on California Creek, a noted camp location on the road. The crossing point and the gorge leading down to it from the east are now submerged under Lake Amistad.

== History ==
Robert A. Eccleston described the crossing and the route from San Felipe Springs to the Devils River in his diary of his journey over the San Antonio-El Paso Road with some of the emigrants to California, travelling with the military expedition that pioneered the route in 1849:

Tuesday, July 10th. We started from the campground this morning at 6 1/2 O'clock and crossed the river. .... We understand that we were to camp at a pond 8 miles distant. ... We found no water pond of any description at 8 miles. We travelled on through a gorge between and came to the River Styx, or as it is commonly called, Devils River. There was no pasture here at all and our waggons stood directly in the road. On one side there was a perpendicular elevation of rocks, some 40 feet high, on the other side a steep sloping bank. The only good thing that can be said of this place is that we had plenty of good water to drink and a fine place to bathe. The Devils River at this place runs over a solid bed of rock, and the water is from 1 to 2 feet deep and so clear that the smallest thing can be seen at the bottom. It is over 100 feet across as the road runs. The opposite bank is somewhat steep but the descent on this side easy.

There was formerly a stone stagecoach station at the crossing, mentioned by Burr G. Duval in "Journal of a Prospecting Trip to West Texas in 1879", his diary of his journey along the San Antonio-El Paso Road in 1879.
