= Fort Stockton Historic District =

- U.S. National Register of Historic Places
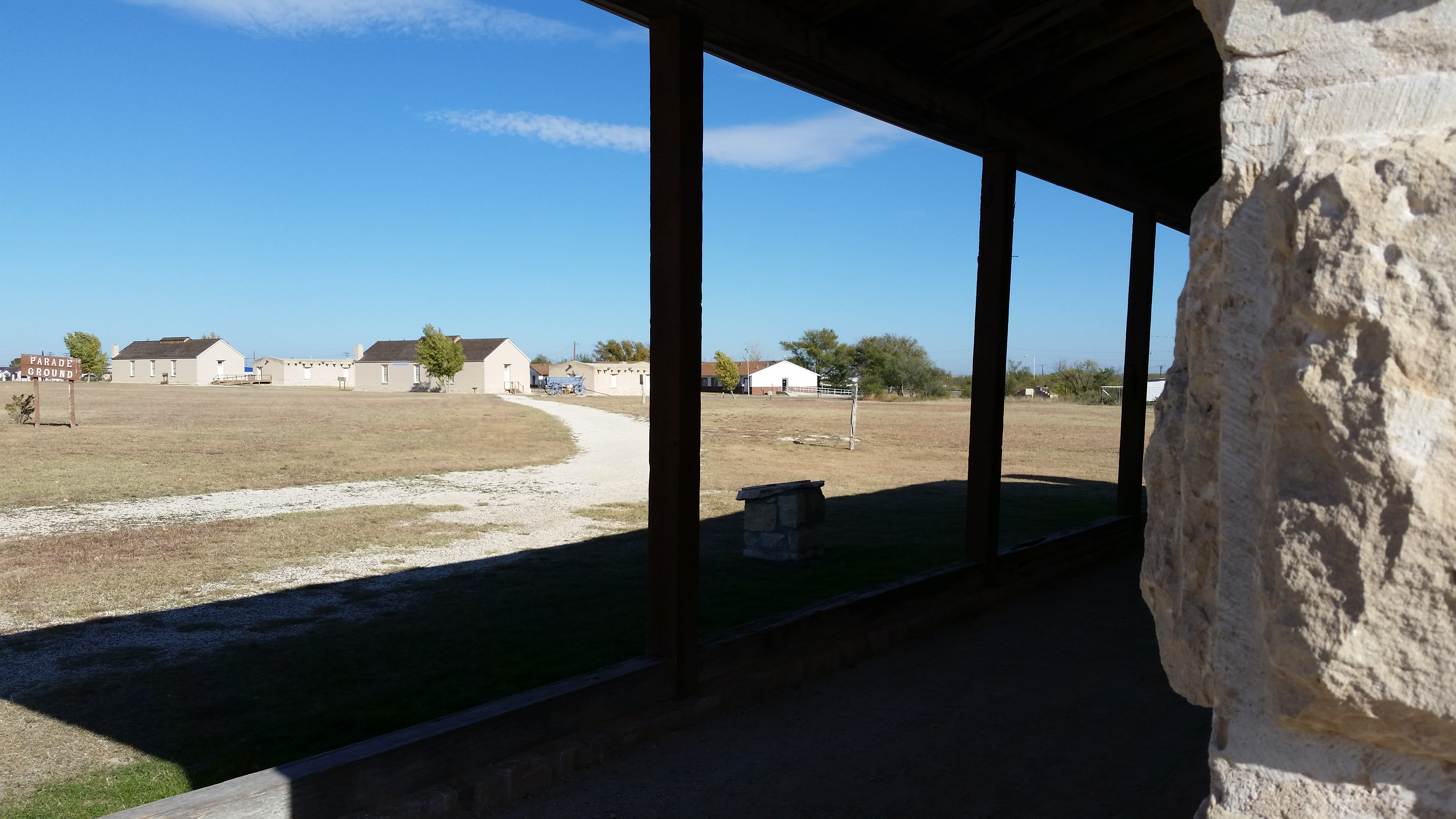
- Parade ground and barracks, viewed from guard house

- Location within Texas Location within the United States
- Location: Fort Stockton, Texas
- Coordinates: 30.8875°N 102.875556°W
- Area: 75 acres (30 ha)
- Built: 1858
- NRHP reference No.: 73001971
- Added to NRHP: April 2, 1973

The Fort Stockton Historic District, in Fort Stockton, Texas, is a 75 acres (30 ha) historic district which was listed on the National Register of Historic Places on April 2, 1973.

It includes Recorded Texas Historic Landmarks.

== Historic Fort Stockton Highlights ==
- Annie Riggs Memorial Museum
- Buffalo Soldier
- Camp Stockton
- Comanche People
- Comanche Springs
- Comanche War Trail
- Early Settlers and Vaqueros
- Grey Mule Saloon
- Old Pecos County Jail
- South Orient Rail Line

== Illustrations ==
Fort Stockton Historic District Landmarks
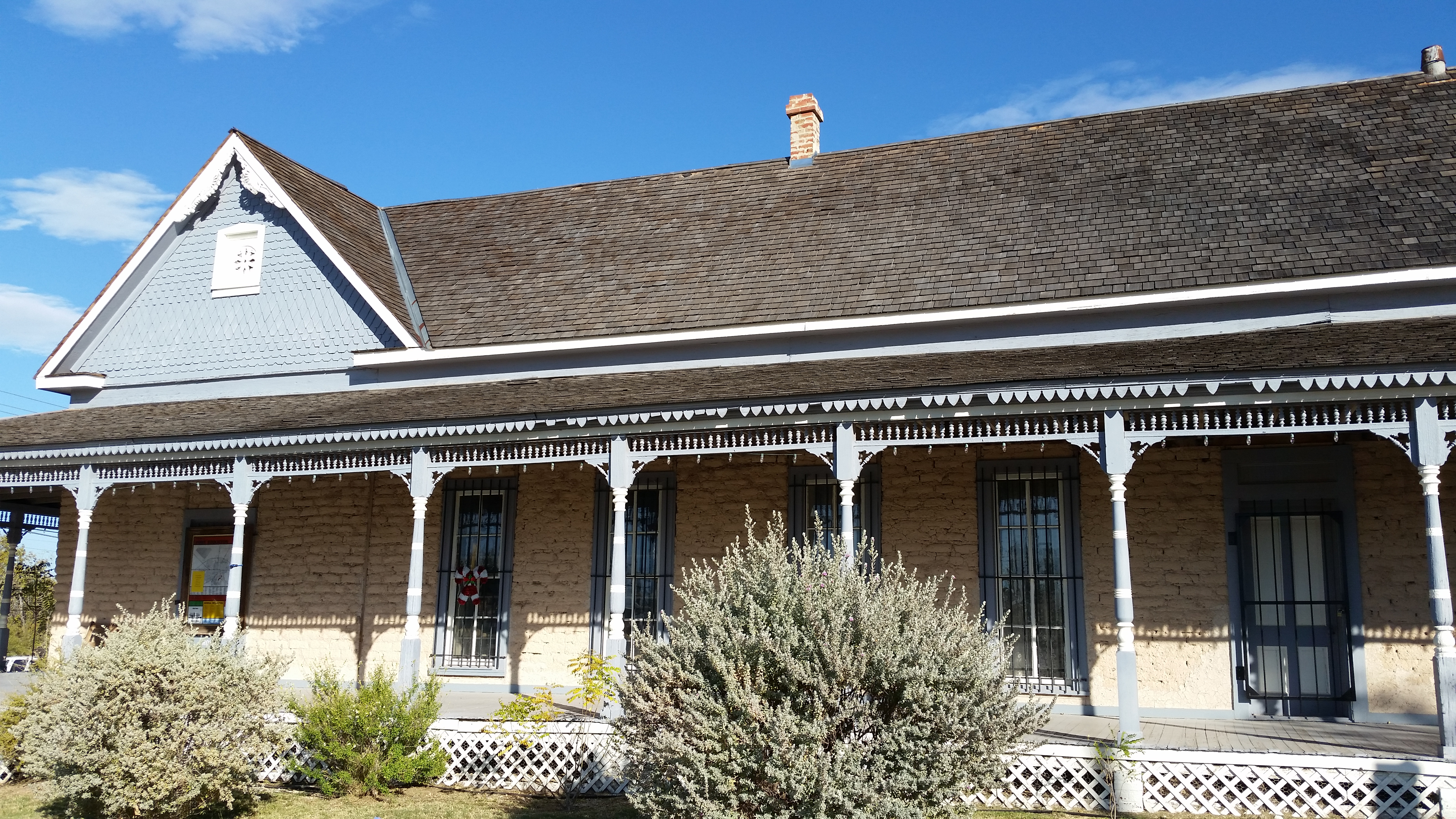
Annie Riggs Memorial Museum

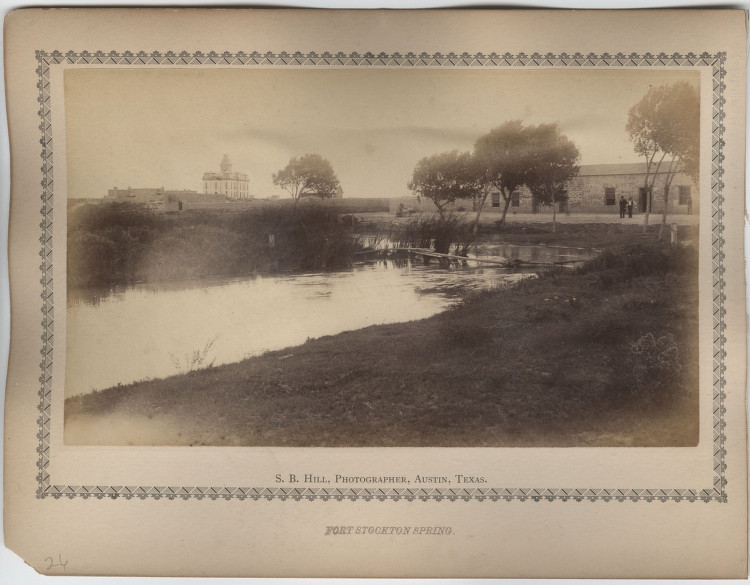
Comanche Springs

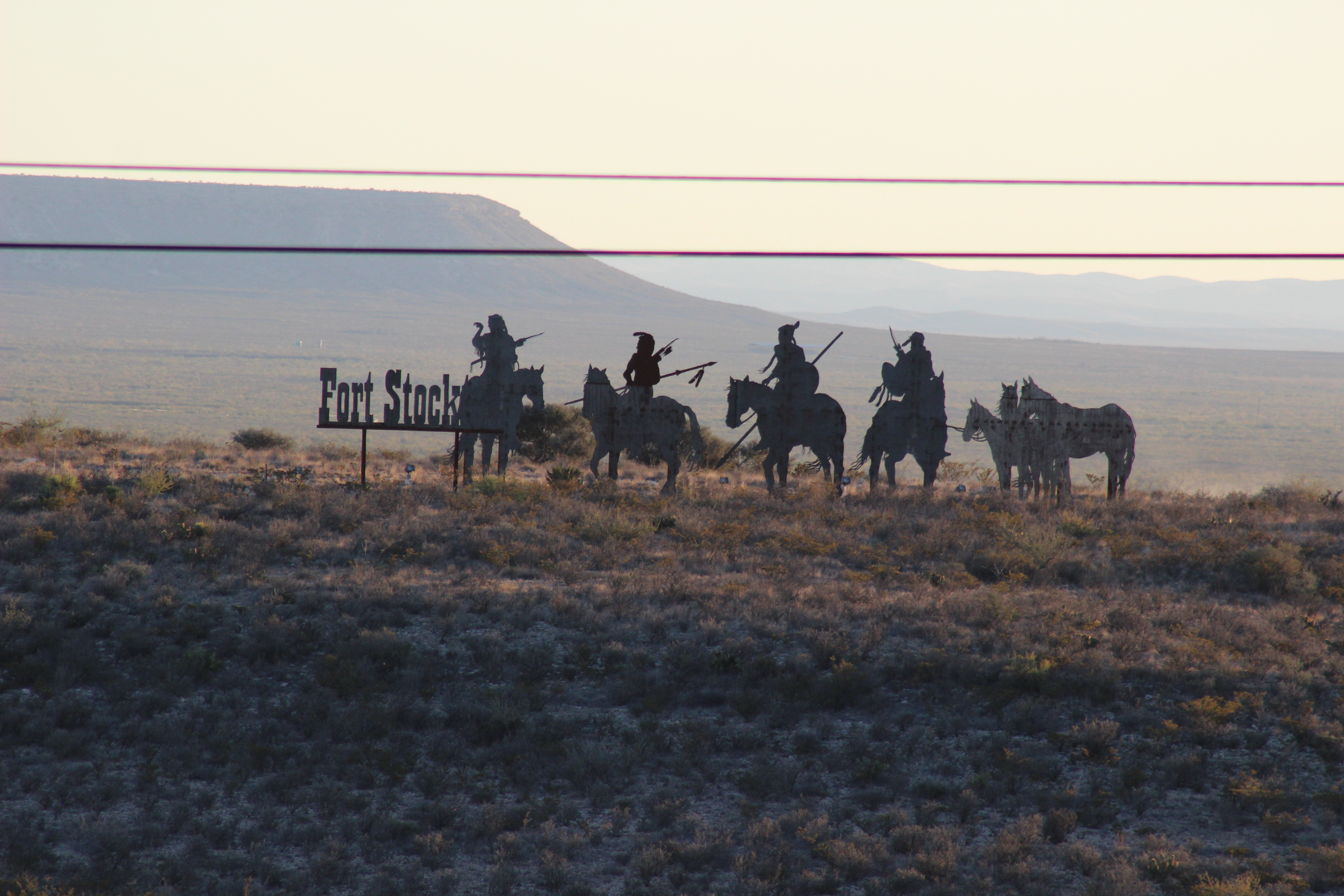
Comanche Trail Silhouette

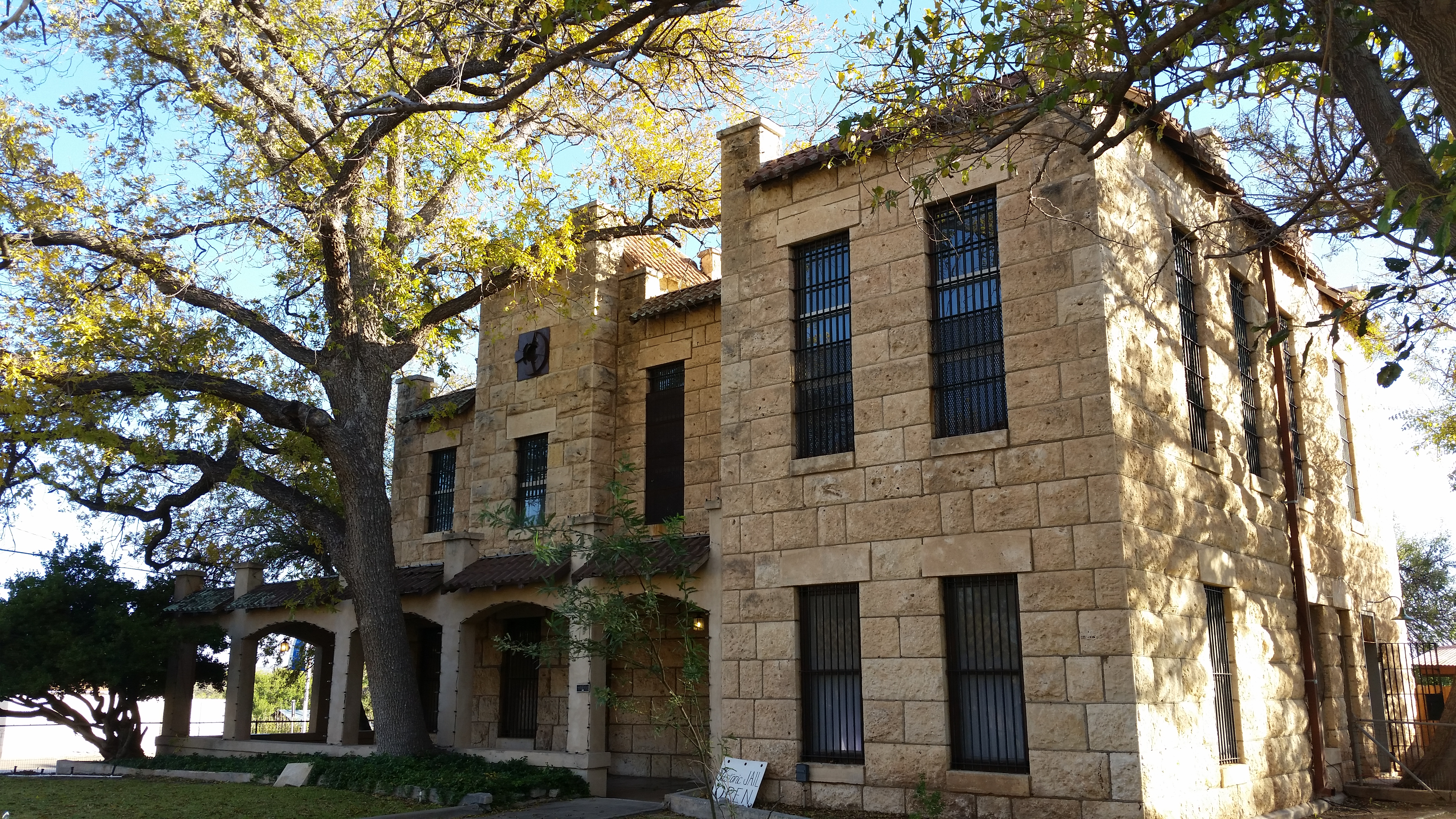
Historical Pecos County Jail

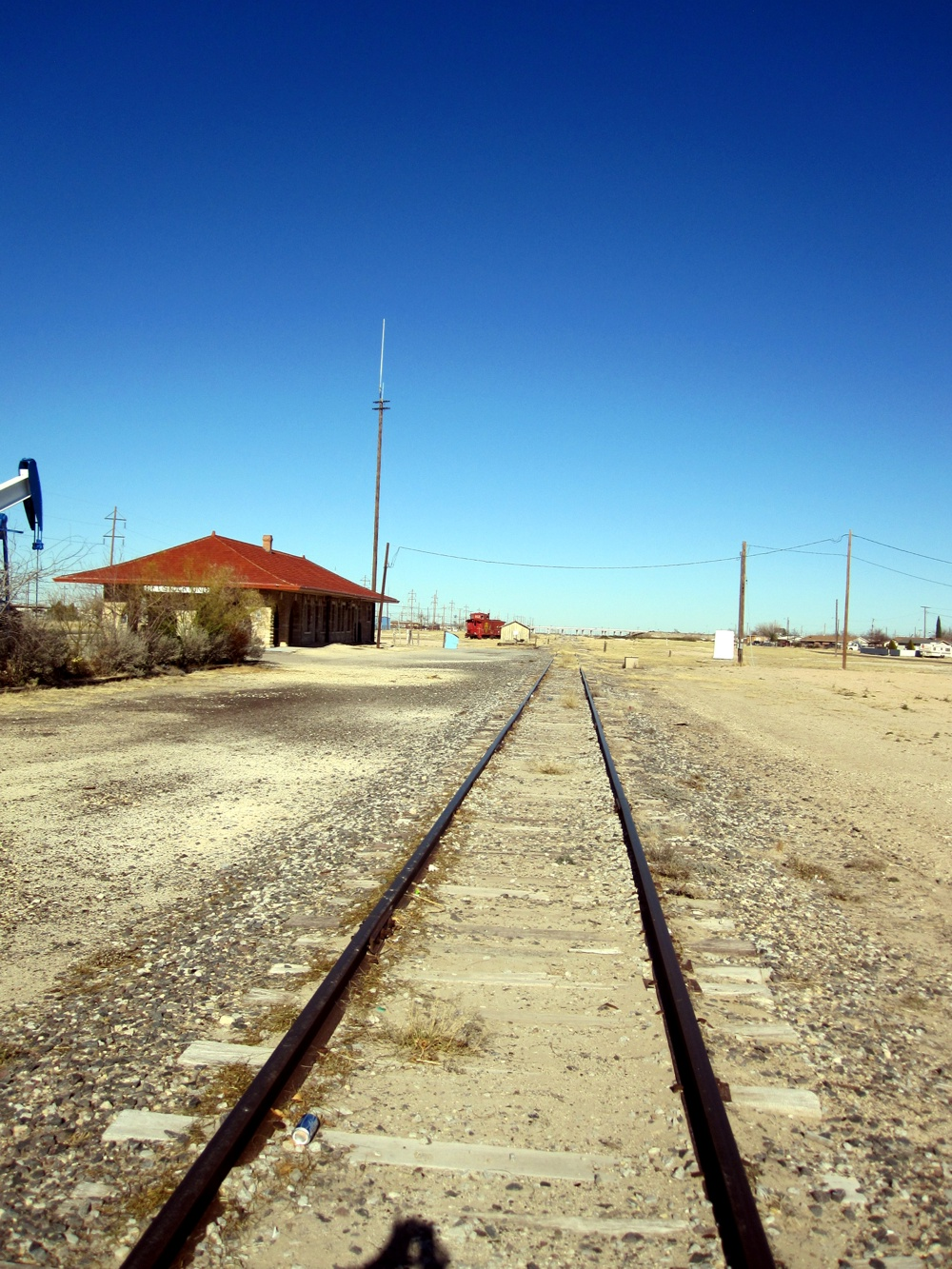
Kansas City, Mexico and Orient Railway Depot
