= California Creek =

California Creek may refer to:

- California Creek (Texas), a tributary of the Amistad Reservoir
- California Creek (Washington), in Whatcom County, Washington
- California Creek (Montana), a tributary of the Ruby River
- California Creek Missionary Baptist Church
