= Chacon Creek (Nueces River tributary) =

Stream in Texas, United States

- Map

Location
- Country: United States
- State: Texas

Chacon Creek is a stream tributary to the Nueces River via Turkey Creek, Espantosa Slough and into the Nueces through Line Oak or Soldier Sloughs. Its source is at the conjunction of Elm Creek with Salado Creek, 28°53′33″N 100°10′38″W, in Maverick County. Its mouth is at its confluence with Palo Blanco Creek in Zavala County, Texas, which then empties into Comanche Creek, which goes on to empty into Turkey Creek.

== See also ==
- List of rivers of Texas
