= Dead Mans Pass =

Gap in Val Verde County, Texas, US

Coordinates: 29.79882°N 101.14455°W

Dead Mans Pass is a gap located in Val Verde County, Texas an elevation of 1837 feet.

Originally a pass along the Chihuahua Road or Old Spanish Road, later San Antonio-El Paso Road, between the first and second crossings of the Devils River. This place along the road north Comstock called “Dead Man's Pass” or “Dead Man's Run” saw many travelers die in the 19th century near the south entrance, it was described as a narrow canyon near Pecan Springs.

Texas State Highway 163 now passes through it from north to south between Comstock and Bakers Crossing.
