= Elm Creek (Rio Grande tributary) =

River in Texas, United States

Coordinates: 28°44′37″N 100°30′37″W

See Elm Creek (Nueces River tributary) for the tributary of the Nueces River, in Maverick County, Texas.

Elm Creek, is one of two streams of that name in Kinney County and Maverick County, Texas. Elm Creek joins the Rio Grande about 4 miles downstream from Elm Creek, Texas, and 1.1 miles up river from Eagle Pass, Texas. Its source is just north of the Kinney County line, south of Spofford, Texas.
