= California Creek (Texas) =

- Map

Location
- Country: United States
- State: Texas
- County: Val Verde County

Physical characteristics
- Source
  - coordinates: 29°37′29″N 101°02′14″W

California Creek, formerly Painted Cave Spring Creek is a stream in Val Verde County, Texas, and was formerly a tributary of Devils River. It now flows into the north side of Amistad Reservoir at an elevation of 1119 feet. California Creek has its source at 29°37′29″N 101°02′14″W.

California Creek was the route of the San Antonio-El Paso Road followed northwest from Painted Caves to the point that the trail diverted to the upper Evans Creek and California Spring.

== See also ==
- List of rivers of Texas
