= Point of Rocks (Texas) =

Hill in the United States

Coordinates: 30°32′05″N 104°03′51″W

Point of Rocks also known as Bald Rock, is a hill and a locale in Jeff Davis County, Texas. Point of Rocks, is an isolated hill with a spring once known as Bald Rock Spring. It was used as a watering place and campsite on the San Antonio-El Paso Road, 10 miles west of Fort Davis, Texas, now Point of Rocks Roadside Park. The elevation of Point of Rocks Spring, is at 5,469 feet / 1,667 meters, at the foot of the southeast slope of the Point of Rocks that reaches over 5,920 feet along its crest.

== History ==
Point of Rocks or Bald Rock was the location of a spring, along the San Antonio - El Paso Road, the first military road through West Texas from San Antonio to El Paso. The road was established in 1849 just as the California Gold Rush began, several parties of 49ers accompanied or followed the Army expedition that established the route.

Point of Rocks, was used by travelers along the route and was a stop used by stagecoach companies on that route, including the San Antonio-El Paso Mail, San Antonio-San Diego Mail Line and was a watering place available to the Butterfield Overland Mail Company coaches a little over midway on their run between Fort Davis and Barrel Springs. According to Edward Fitzgerald Beale's 1857 account they left Fort Davis in the afternoon and"...came out about ten miles to Bald Rock spring, where we found excellent water, but no wood or grass. We encamped here for the night."
