= Rancheros Creek =

River in Uvalde County, Texas

Rancheros Creek Ranchero Creek, Comanche Creek
- Location of the mouth within Texas

Location
- Country: United States
- State: Texas
- Region: Uvalde County

Physical characteristics
- Source: source
  - location: ten miles south of Utopia, Uvalde County, Texas
  - coordinates: 29°30′08″N 99°27′25″W
  - elevation: 1,480 ft (450 m)
- Mouth: mouth
  - location: confluence with Sabinal River, four miles south of Sabinal., Uvalde County, Texas
  - coordinates: 29°15′08″N 99°27′44″W
  - elevation: 814 ft (248 m)
- Length: 26 mi (42 km)

Basin features
- River system: Sabinal River, Frio River, Nueces River
- Tributaries
  - left: Comanche Creek, Little Comanche Creek
  - right: Elm Creek

Rancheros Creek is a tributary stream of the Sabinal River, in Medina County and Uvalde County, Texas.

Rancheros Creek runs 26 miles from its source in hills 10 miles south of Uvalde, Texas. It runs southeast for a few miles being joined from the left bank by Comanche Creek, then to Comanche Waterhole where it has its confluence with Little Comanche Creek before turning to the southwest and running to its confluence with the Sabinal River, four miles south of Sabinal. Midway on this reach of the creek Elm Creek joins it from the right bank southeast of Sabinal.

Rancheros Creek was a watering place for travelers on the San Antonio-El Paso Road including the stagecoach lines like the San Antonio-El Paso Mail and San Antonio-San Diego Mail Line.

== See also ==
- List of rivers of Texas
