= Gillis Springs =

Coordinates: 29°43′31″N 101°02′31″W

Gillis Springs, formerly Willow Spring, is a historical spring, two miles, (3 km) northwest of California Spring in Val Verde County, Texas.

Willow Spring was 16.39 miles, (26 km), south of Fort Hudson and the second crossing of the Devils River on the San Antonio-El Paso Road. It was the last water for travelers from the east on the road before Dead Mans Pass. The water of Gillis Springs, that flowed out of the Boquillas limestone, dried up in recent times.
