= Sycamore Creek (Kinney County, Texas) =

Sycamore Creek, a tributary stream of the Rio Grande, with its source in Edwards County, 10 miles (16 km) east of Carta Valley in southwest Edwards County, 29°47′33″N 100°30′31″W. It flows southwestward to Val Verde County then southward to the Val Verde / Kinney County line along which it flows past its confluence with Mud Creek and Sacatosa Creek to the Rio Grande.

== See also ==
- List of rivers of Texas
