= Comanche Trail =

Comanche travel route in Texas

The Comanche Trail, sometimes called the Comanche War Trail or the Comanche Trace, was a travel route in Texas established by the nomadic Comanche and their Kiowa and Kiowa Apache allies. Although called a "trail," the Comanche Trail was actually a network of parallel and branching trails, always running from one source of good water to another. The trail was especially important from the 1830s to 1850s when the Comanche launched large scale raids from Texas into Mexico. Hundreds of warriors annually followed the trail southward in fall and returned with their booty, mostly livestock, in late winter or spring.

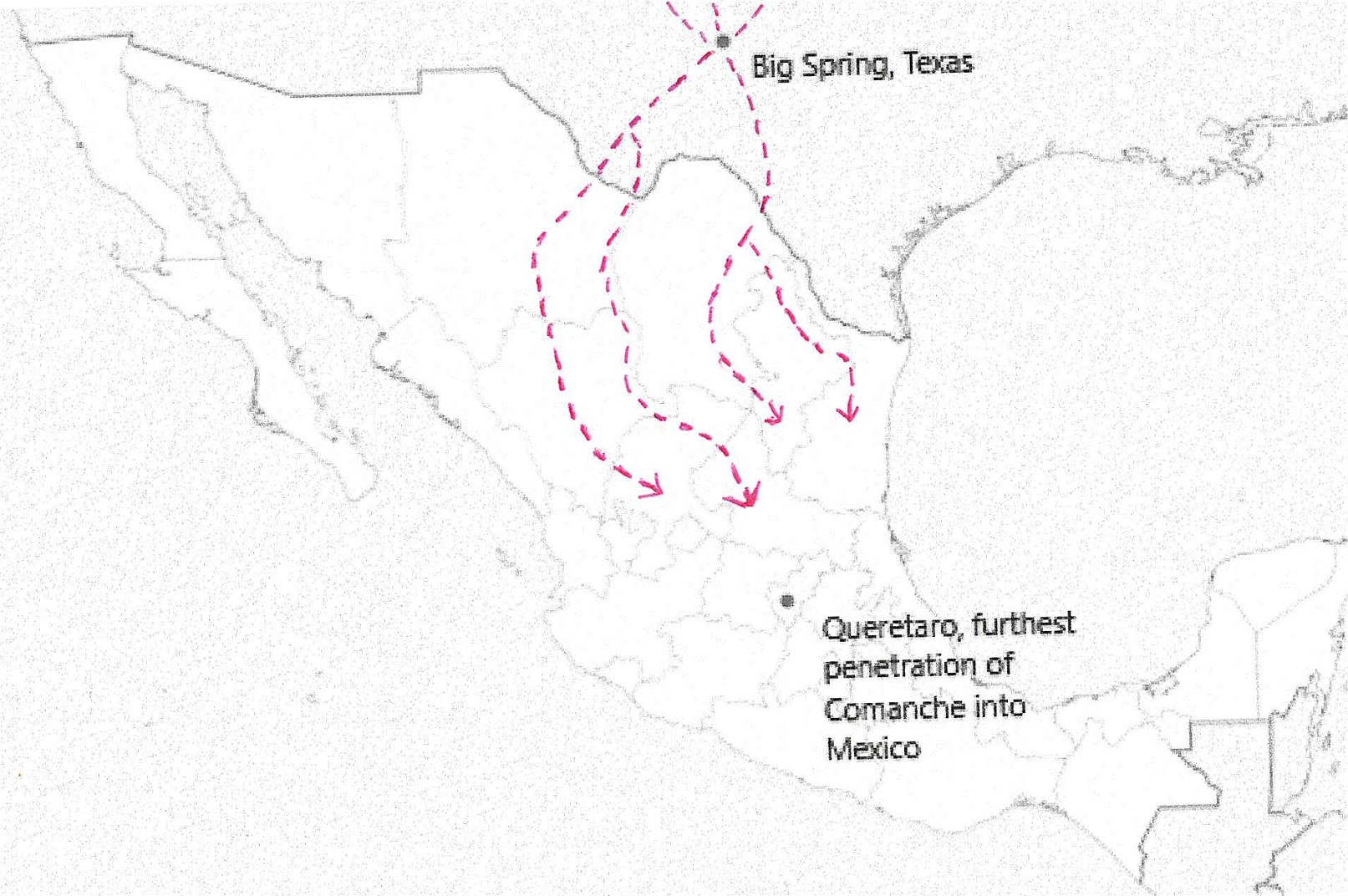
To raid Mexico, the Comanche Trail started in Big Spring, Texas and penetrated deep into Mexico by several routes.

== Description ==
The route ran from the Comanche summer hunting grounds on the Great Plains of northern Texas, Oklahoma, New Mexico, Colorado, and Kansas to the Rio Grande river which formed the border of the United States and Mexico. In the 18th century, the Spanish had established a line of missions and presidios to defend from what was then called New Spain from the Comanche and other Indian tribes. Mexican independence from Spain in 1821 resulted in a decrease in the new country's capability to defend itself from Indian raids. At the same time, there was a growing demand for livestock, especially horses and mules, in the expanding United States. The Comanche took advantage of the situation by raiding hundreds of miles deep into Mexico for livestock which they marketed in the United States. By 1857 parts of the trail had been named and appeared on maps. The Comanche launched their raids on Mexico in autumn, riding south on nights with a full moon, called a Comanche Moon in Texas.

Following water sources, the primary trail ran north from two starting points on the Rio Grande River, one at Boquillas and the other at Presidio, with crossings of the river at both locations. The legs of the trail met at Comanche Springs, near Fort Stockton, Texas and Las Moras Springs near Fort Clark. The trail continued north to cross the Pecos River in the vicinity of Horsehead Crossing, bending northeast to the area of Odessa and Big Spring, Texas. From there the Comanche Trail ran east past the Caprock Escarpment and on across the Llano Estacado by two separate routes. One branch ran to the vicinity of Lubbock and along the Double Mountains (Texas) fork of the Brazos River to near the present site of Abernathy, to near Littlefield, then via a series of springs to the Pecos River near Fort Sumner. A separate fork ran from Big Spring, Texas to near Plainview, Texas, rejoining the other route to the east of Muleshoe. Northern branches of the trail ran through the Texas Panhandle into Oklahoma, Colorado and Kansas. Southern branches extended into northern Mexico through Chihuahua, Coahuila and Durango to Zacatecas and San Luis Potosi, while an eastern fork ran from Big Spring, Texas southeast to Nuevo Leon and Tamaulipas.

The Comanche Trail was noted as a beaten path as much as a mile wide. Much of the southeastern leg of the main trail runs through what is now Big Bend National Park, leaving the park through Persimmon Gap in the Santiago Mountains in the northern portion of the park. U.S. Route 385 follows the same route through parts of the park.

== See also ==
Comanche-Mexico War
Comancheria
Comanchero
Treaty of Guadalupe Hidalgo
