= Las Moras Creek =

American stream in Texas

Las Moras Creek, a stream in Kinney and Maverick Counties in Texas. Its source is on the northern foot of Las Moras Mountain, five miles northeast of Brackettville in Kinney County, at 29°22′25″N 100°23′09″W. It runs south southwest for forty miles, through Las Moras Springs at Brackettville, to its mouth at its confluence with the Rio Grande, five miles northwest of Quemado in Maverick County.

== History ==
The San Antonio-El Paso Road crossed Las Moras Creek at Las Moras Springs, where Fort Clark would be established to guard the route. Later Brackettville would be founded north of the fort on the creek.

== See also ==
- List of rivers of Texas
