= Tunas Springs =

Spring in Pecos County, Texas, USA

Coordinates: 30°51′31″N 102°33′32″W

Tunas Spring, formerly Escondido Spring, a spring along Tunas Creek (formerly Arroyo Escondido), a tributary of the Pecos River in Pecos County, Texas.

== History ==
Known originally as Escondido Spring, Tunas Spring was a watering and resting place on the San Antonio-El Paso Road for travelers and for the stagecoaches of the San Antonio-San Diego Mail Line and other lines. It was 8.58 miles east of were that road met the Arroyo Escondido and 19.4 miles from Comanche Springs.

In one of the earliest descriptions of the road from the Pecos to Escondido Springs and the springs themselves is found in the December 21, 1849 report Captain S. G. French, of the Quartermaster's Department:

Leaving the Pecos, the [San Antonio-El Paso] road turns directly to the west, up a wide valley or plain, with hills in broken ridges on both sides. As the distance increases, the soil becomes more and more sterile, without grass, and yielding support to nothing but dwarf bushes, Spanish bayonets, and stunted cactus. Continuing over a gently-swelling hill, another valley is entered, following which about six miles, water is found in ponds, some of them quite deep, surrounded by a tall growth of rushes and cane. The water rises from a rocky bottom, and, as it imperceptibly glides away, gives life and freshness to the coarse grass and cane. This water is distant from the Pecos about eighteen miles, and has been called Escondido creek. The grazing is not good, and wood for fuel is scarce. Eight miles further on are the Escondido springs. The water gushes out from beneath a shelf of rocks, and flows some distance down the creek. The country around is rocky and barren, covered with chaparral and prickly pear. The grazing is limited, and wood by no means plenty.

On July 13, 1857, Edward Fitzgerald Beale described it:

Started at 4 a m. and travelled over an almost level country until we came to the Escondido spring. This water is beautifully clear, though slightly brackish. There is sufficient grass here, but of a coarse innutritious quality.
