= Wild Rose Pass =

Coordinates: 30°42′52″N 103°46′57″W

Wild Rose Pass is a gap in the Davis Mountains in Jeff Davis County, Texas. It lies at an elevation of 4,554 feet / 1,388 meters.

== History ==
Wild Rose Pass was where travelers on the San Antonio-El Paso Road passed into the uplands of West Texas, bypassing a narrows in Limpia Canyon on its way to Fort Davis.

== The site today ==
Wild Rose Pass is today along the route of Texas State Highway 17 northeast of Fort Davis, Texas.
