= Leaving of Pecos =

Place in Texas, US

Coordinates: 30°59′31″N 102°08′34″W

Pecos County in Texas

Leaving of Pecos was originally a camping place along the west bank of the Pecos River, on the wagon road called the Lower Emigrant Road, Military Road or San Antonio-El Paso Road in Texas.

It was located 38 miles north of the Lancaster Crossing of the Pecos, and 16 miles east of the first crossing of Escondido Creek. It was also located a mile north of where the wagon road had its junction with a cutoff to the north to the wagon road called the Upper Emigrant Road between Fredericksburg, Texas and Comanche Springs, now Fort Stockton, Texas, where it joined the Lower Emigrant Road.

It was later a stopping place on the route of San Antonio - El Paso Mail and the San Antonio–San Diego Mail Line.
