= Painted Caves =

Cave in Texas, United States

Coordinates: 29°14′29″N 101°01′21″W

Painted Caves was a cave containing a spring in Val Verde County, Texas, 20 kilometers southeast of Comstock, Texas. The cave accompanied a camp site along the San Antonio-El Paso Road on Painted Cave Spring Creek (now known as California Creek) and was named for the indigenous cave paintings found inside. It was located 2.54 miles northwest of the First Crossing of Devils River and 15.73 miles southeast of California Spring. The cave is now submerged under Lake Amistad.

== History ==
The cave just beyond the First Crossing of Devils River was described by Robert A. Eccleston in his diary of his journey over the San Antonio-El Paso Road with the military expedition that pioneered the route in 1849:

"Wednesday, July 11. ... After passing through a rocky country for about 3 miles, we came to water in a bed of rock. ... We here visited some caves in the rocks of considerable extent, in which were found Indian drawings, &c., such as buffaloes, men. They were colored."

These paintings were made by a people called the West Texas Cave Dwellers who lived in West Texas for more than 1000 years before the Lipan Apache arrived in the area.

Thirty years later Burr G. Duval described the site in his "Journal of a Prospecting Trip to West Texas in 1879":

Friday, Jan. 9. Pulled out of Devils River, 7 a.m. doubled teams up the hill. Moved only about 8 miles and camped near a water hole on the headwaters of Painted Cave Spring Creek. Painted Cave, two miles out of Devils River, is a noted camp and cave grotto, rather, which was formerly embellished with numerous Indian picture writings, no longer to be seen, but in their place appear the mysterious characters, "S. T. 1860", "X Plantation Bitters", "Tutt's Pills", "Sozodont," etc. showing that the Star of Empire still takes its way westward and that the peripatetic advertising agent is still aboard on "Devils River."

The site was submerged by the construction of Lake Amistad in 1969.
