= James Henry and Rachel Kilby House =

- U.S. National Register of Historic Places
- Location within Georgia
- Nearest city: Clayton, Georgia
- Coordinates: 34.94404°N 83.49453°W
- Area: less than one acre
- Built: 1898
- Built by: James Henry Kilby
- Architectural style: I-House
- NRHP reference No.: 05000078
- Added to NRHP: February 24, 2005

The James Henry and Rachel Kilby House was built around 1898 and was listed on the National Register of Historic Places in 2005. It is located at 28 Tumbling Waters Lane in rural Rabun County, Georgia in the Persimmon community (try Persimmon, Georgia), about 15 miles (24 km) northwest of Clayton.

The house is a two-story I-house with a rear, gabled ell one-and-a-half-stories tall. It had a hall-parlor plan. It rests upon locust and chestnut wood piers in the front, and upon a pine sill atop support stones in the rear.

In 2005, the house was still covered with its original unpainted yellow poplar shiplap siding.

A second contributing building on the property is the barn built at the same time as the house, built of hand-hewn pine, oak, and locust logs, upon a continuous stone foundation. Gables at each end have yellow poplar siding; it has a standing seam metal roof. It is of a type commonly called a transverse crib barn in Georgia, and has cribs on each side of a wide runway.
