= Huffstutler Springs =

Coordinates: 29°57′31″N 101°08′31″W

Huffstutler Springs, is a spring, located near the channel of Devils River (Texas) at an elevation of 1489 feet, 2 to 3 km (1 to 2 mi) south of Texas State Highway 163 at Bakers Crossing bridge in Val Verde County, Texas.

== History ==
Huffstutler Springs was an important location for Native Americans along Devils River for over 9,000 years. Camp Hudson was located nearby from 1857 to 1877.

== Today ==
The springs are obscured by grass and cane, but can be seen from the river. The private ranch on which the spring is located, is trying to preserve its natural state, and so discourages visitors.
