= Tunas Creek =

Stream in Pecos County, Texas

Location
- Country: United States

Physical characteristics
- Source
  - elevation: 3,080 ft (940 m)
- Mouth
  - location: Pecos River
  - elevation: 2,260 ft (690 m)

Tunas Creek formerly known as Arroyo Escondido, is a stream tributary to the Pecos River, in Pecos County, Texas. Its source is at 30°52′53″N 102°34′59″W on the southwestern side of Big Mesa.

== History ==
The San Antonio-El Paso Road met with and crossed Arroyo Escondido, 16.26 miles west of the place called Leaving of Pecos on the Pecos River and 8.58 miles east of Escondido Spring 30°51′31″N 102°33′32″W also on the creek. Both these places were watering and resting places for travelers on the route to Comanche Springs and for the stagecoaches of the San Antonio-San Diego Mail Line and other lines.

== See also ==
- List of rivers of Texas
