= Leon Creek =

Location
- Country: United States
- State: Texas
- Region: Bexar County
- City: San Antonio, Texas

Physical characteristics
- Source: source
  - location: SW slope of Mount Smith, seven miles northwest of Leon Springs, northwestern Bexar County
  - coordinates: 29°40′48″N 98°44′26″W
  - elevation: 1,590 ft (480 m)
- Mouth: mouth
  - location: confluence with Medina River, Bexar County, Texas
  - coordinates: 29°15′53″N 98°29′38″W
  - elevation: 469 ft (143 m)
- Length: 36 mi (58 km)

Basin features
- River system: Medina River

Leon Creek is a tributary stream of the Medina River, in Bexar County, Texas.

Leon Creek has its source seven miles northeast of Leon Springs in northwestern Bexar County. The creek runs southeast through Leon Valley and the west side of the city of San Antonio to its mouth on the Medina River, just west of Cassin and twelve miles south of downtown San Antonio.

Leon Creek was a watering place for travelers on the San Antonio-El Paso Road including the stagecoach lines like the San Antonio-El Paso Mail and San Antonio-San Diego Mail Line.

== See also ==
- List of rivers of Texas
