= San Vicente, Texas =

- Ghost town
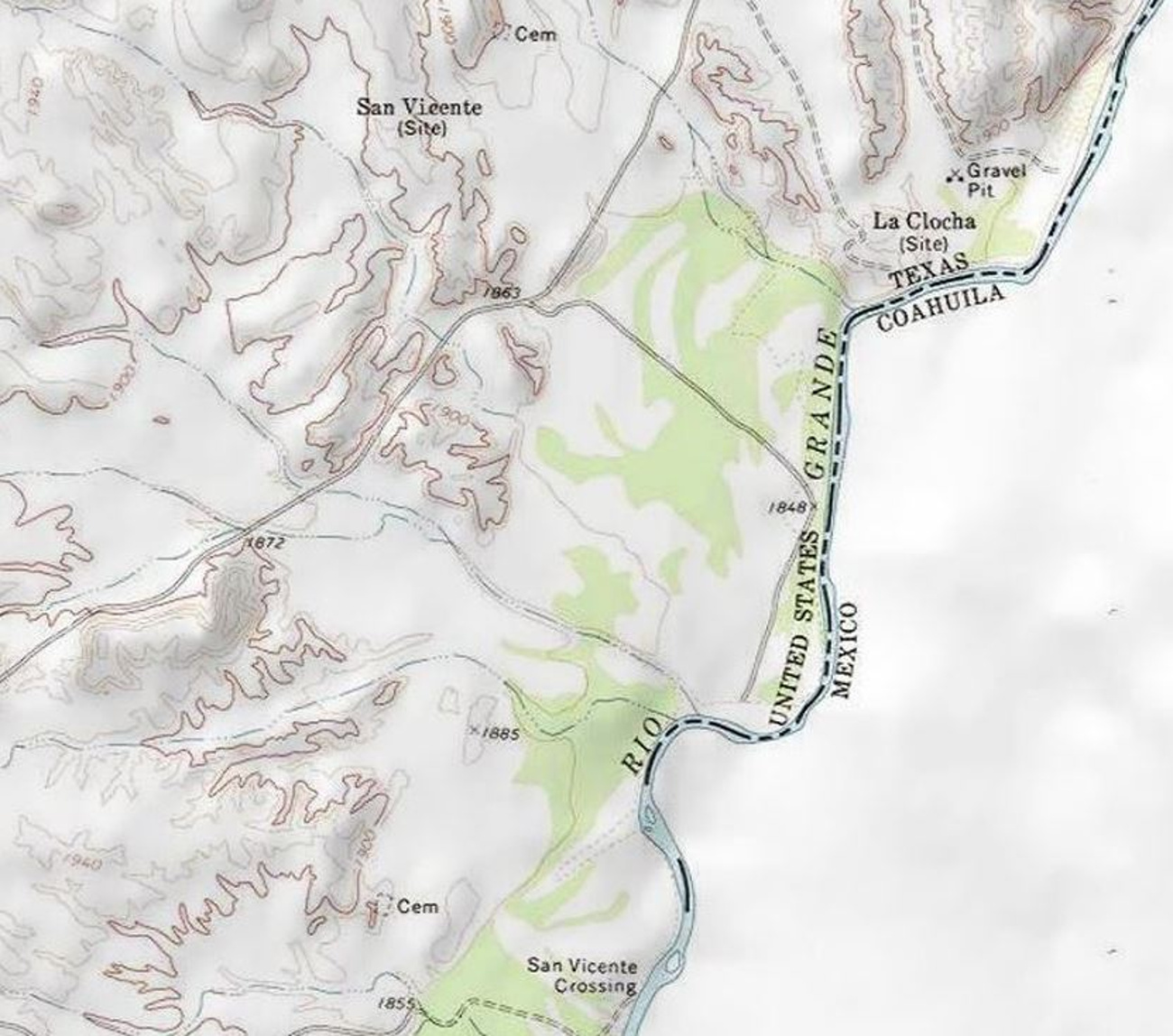

- Location within Texas San Vicente, Texas (the United States)
- Coordinates: 29°09′14″N 103°01′12.5″W
- Country: United States
- State: Texas
- County: Brewster
- Elevation: 1,896 ft (578 m)
- Time zone: UTC-6 (Central (CST))
  - Summer (DST): UTC-5 (CDT)
- ZIP codes: 79834
- Area code: 432
- GNIS feature ID: 1367543

San Vicente is a ghost town in Brewster County, Texas, United States, within the protruding big bend of the Rio Grande. The village was geographically 1.5 miles (2.4 km) north of the San Vicente Crossing in present-day Big Bend National Park. The uninhabited site provides a panoramic view of the Chisos Mountains and the Sierra San Vicente migrating into Northern Mexico.

== Historical citations of San Vicente ==
San Vicente settlement established cemeteries north and south of the village vicinity encompassing 1.6 miles (2.6 km) between the memorial grounds. The south funerary plot, also known as the San Vicente Crossing cemetery, has a proximity to the San Vicente Crossing on the Rio Grande.

== Presidio of San Vicente ==
On September 10, 1772, the Spanish Empire issued new regulations for presidios constructed in New Spain along the southern boundaries of the Rio Grande river basin in the Northern Mexico territories. Presidio de San Vicente was established in 1773 offering sanctuary for Spanish Texas pioneers seeking passage through the San Vicente Crossing at the Rio Grande. It was under the jurisdiction of Nueva Vizcaya, New Spain. The presidio fortification was an adobe and pueblo style structure serving as a garrison while providing a defensive wall against the native plains inhabitants during the Mexican Indian Wars. The Spanish Presidio coerced the territorial development of New Spain in the Chihuahua and Coahuila territories of the Spanish America colonies while fortifying the Spanish missions in Texas.

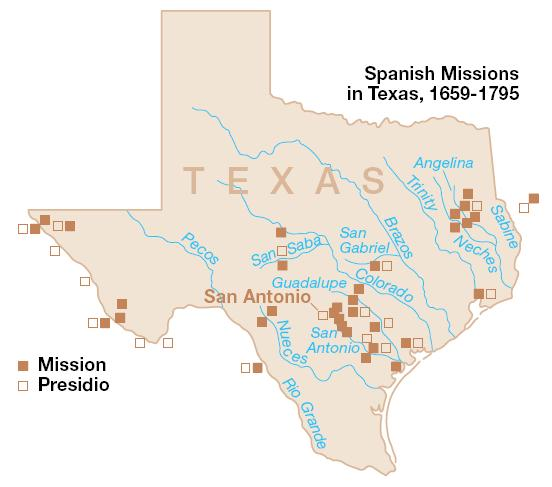
Spanish Missions in Texas, 1659–1795

== See also ==
- Adams–Onís Treaty
- French colonization of Texas
- Cayetano Pignatelli, 3rd Marquis of Rubí
- Nueva Vizcaya, New Spain
- Charles III of Spain
- Provincias Internas
- Comanche Trail
- United States Camel Corps

== Audiobook bibliography ==
- History of the Conquest of Mexico public domain audiobook at LibriVox

== Bibliography ==
- Solís, Antonio de (1724). The History of the Conquest of Mexico by the Spaniards. London, England: T. Woodward and J. Hooke. OCLC 1046514488 – via Internet Archive.
- Solís, Antonio de (1738). The History of the Conquest of Mexico by the Spaniards. Vol. I. London, England: John Osborn. OCLC 733087530 – via Internet Archive.
- Solís, Antonio de (1738). The History of the Conquest of Mexico by the Spaniards. Vol. II. London, England: John Osborn. OCLC 733087530 – via Internet Archive.
- Bonnycastle, Richard Henry (1818). Spanish America; A Descriptive, Historical, and Geographical Account of the Dominions of Spain in the Western Hemisphere, Continental & Insular [Account of Spanish America]. Vol. I. London, England: Longman, Hurst, Rees, Orme, and Brown. OCLC 298513594 – via Internet Archive.
- Bonnycastle, Richard Henry (1818). Spanish America; A Descriptive, Historical, and Geographical Account of the Dominions of Spain in the Western Hemisphere, Continental & Insular [Account of Spanish America]. Vol. II. London, England: Longman, Hurst, Rees, Orme, and Brown. OCLC 981299968 – via Internet Archive.
- Bonnycastle, Richard Henry (1819). Spanish America; A Descriptive, Historical, and Geographical Account of the Dominions of Spain in the Western Hemisphere, Continental & Insular [Account of Spanish America]. Philadelphia, Pennsylvania: Abraham Small Publisher. OCLC 1157455578 – via Internet Archive.
- Bolton, Herbert Eugene (1915). Texas in the Middle Eighteenth Century: Studies in Spanish Colonial History and Administration. Berkeley, California: University of California Press. OCLC 558670456 – via Internet Archive.
- Haskell, Marion L. (January 1, 1918). "Review Of Rubí's Inspection of the Frontier Presidios of New Spain, 1766-1768". Annual Publication of the Historical Society of Southern California. 11 (1). Historical Society of Southern California: 33–43. doi:10.2307/41168757. JSTOR 41168757.
