= Cottonwoods Station =

Overland Mail stagecoach stop in Texas

Cottonwoods Station was a stop on the San Antonio-San Diego Mail Line and later the Butterfield Overland Mail stagecoach station in El Paso County, Texas.

Its location was described by Waterman L. Ormsby, a reporter who rode the first westbound stagecoach on the Butterfield Overland Mail:

About 21 miles from Franklin we changed horses at a station in a pretty grove of cottonwood trees - the only habitation before reaching Fort Fillmore eighteen miles further on.

Cottonwoods Station, according to Ormsby, was 21 miles above Franklin, Texas on the old road into New Mexico, along the Rio Grande. G. Baily, a postal inspector, reported it in 1858 to be 22 miles from Franklin. The station is thought to be somewhere in Anthony, Texas although the exact location is still in dispute. One site is believed to be at 31°58.857′N 106°35.427′W another is 31°59′52″N 106°36′30″W.
