= Camp Hudson =

Coordinates: 29°57′31″N 101°8′47″W

Camp Hudson, later Fort Hudson, was located on the west bank of the Devils River, below the Second Crossing of Devils River by the San Antonio-El Paso Road (now known as Bakers Crossing nearby to the north) and 19 miles south of Juno and 21 miles north of Comstock in Val Verde County, Texas. It lay near the mouth of Hudson Canyon and near Huffstutler Springs. Camp Hudson and Hudson Canyon were named for 2nd Lieutenant Walter W. Hudson, an American soldier who died in the area on 19 April 1850 in fighting with local Native Americans.

== History ==
Camp Hudson was established June 7, 1857, to protect wagon traffic on the San Antonio–El Paso Road and the stagecoaches of the San Antonio–El Paso Mail and San Antonio–San Diego Mail Line between the Fort Clark and Fort Lancaster. At that time it was in what was then Kinney County. It was named for Lt. Walter W. Hudson, who died of injuries he received in a fight with hostile Indians in April 1850.

Abandoned by Federal troops March 17, 1861, just before the beginning of the American Civil War, it was occupied by the Confederate 2nd Texas Cavalry as a frontier outpost from 1861 to 1862. It guarded the road to El Paso from hostile Indians, escorting supply trains for the forces of the New Mexico Campaign. It was abandoned along with the other forts in West Texas after the failure of the New Mexico Campaign.

Federal troops returned to Camp Hudson in November 1867, following an attack on a stagecoach between Camp Hudson and Fort Stockton, where two military escorts were killed. Companies D and G of the U. S. Ninth Cavalry were ordered to Camp Hudson. From April 1868 it became a permanent post whose garrisons remained to fight the hostiles until January 1877 when Camp Hudson was permanently closed.

The site of Camp Hudson was marked by the Texas Historical Commission placed a Texas Centennial Marker (#4744: Site of Camp Hudson) 19 miles south of Juno along Texas State Highway 163 in 1936.
