= California Spring =

Freshwater spring in Texas, USA

Coordinates: 29°42′41″N 101°5′57″W

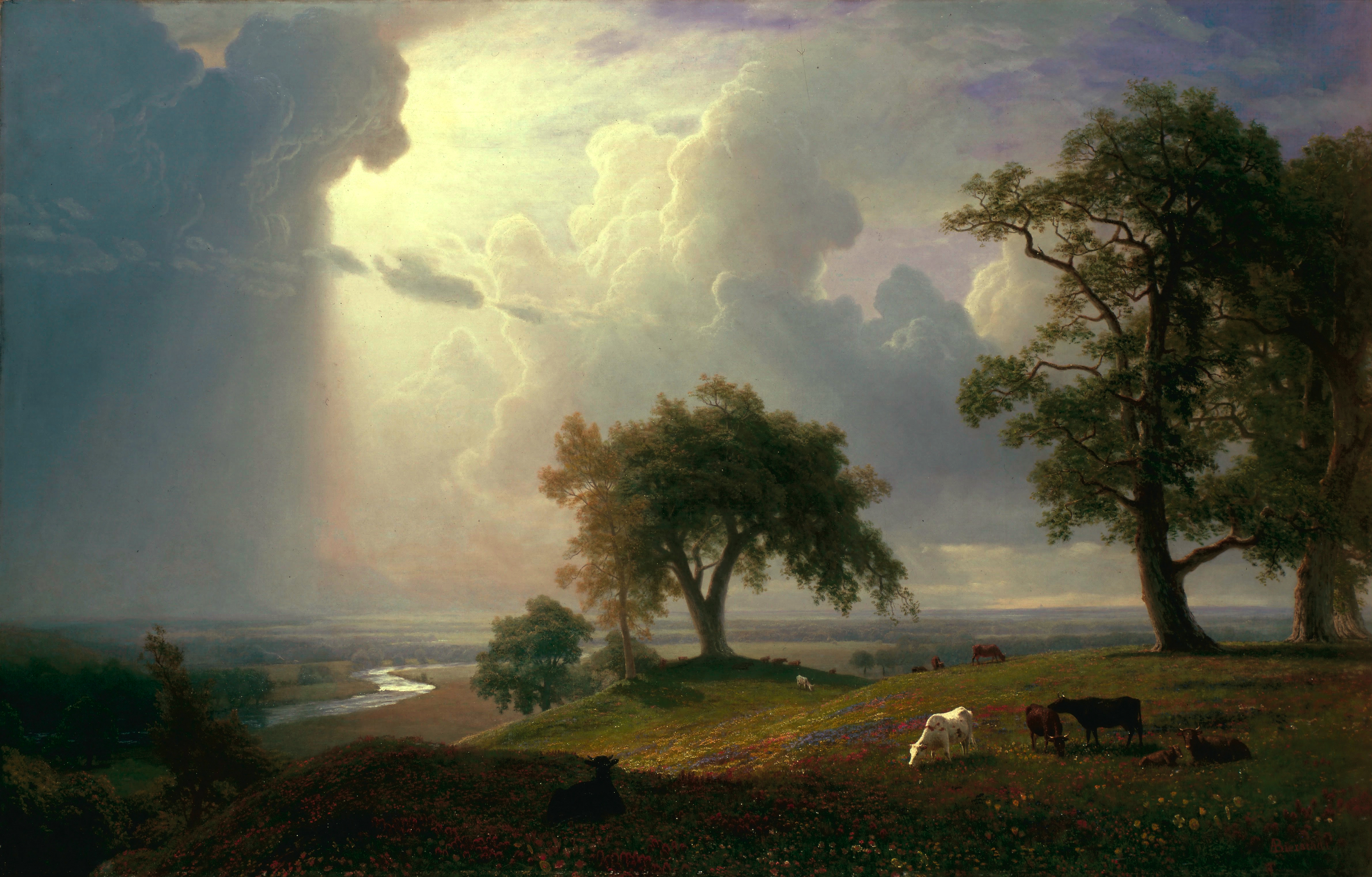
Depiction of California Spring by Albert Bierstadt

California Spring, or Yellow Banks, is a spring at the headwaters of Evans Creek, in Val Verde County, 4.8 miles northeast of Comstock.

== History ==
California Spring was a water stop on the San Antonio-El Paso Road, 15.73 miles northwest of Painted Caves and 2 miles southeast of Willow Spring another water stop on the old road. Shallow wells were dug for easier access to the water. A pool of water existed at the spring until the 1930s. Now the channel is filled with gravel.
