= Evans Creek (Devils River tributary) =

Stream in Val Verde County, Texas

- Map

Location
- Country: United States
- State: Texas
- County: Val Verde County

Evans Creek is a stream which was formerly a tributary of California Creek, itself a tributary of Devils River, in Val Verde County, Texas. It now flows into the western side of Amistad Reservoir at an elevation of 1119 feet. Its source is at 29°45′40″N 101°10′06″W, elevation 1980 feet, near McNutt Summit.

== See also ==
- List of rivers of Texas
