= Lancaster Crossing =

Natural ford of the Pecos River in Texas

Coordinates: 30°39′24″N 101°46′9″W

Lancaster Crossing, also known as Indian Ford, Pecos Crossing, Solomon's Ford, Crossing of the Pecos, Crossing Rio Pecos, Ferry of the Pecos, and Ford Canyon Crossing, is an historic ford and ferry on the Pecos River, between Crockett County and Pecos County just southeast of Sheffield, Texas. Named after nearby Fort Lancaster, it is one of the few natural fords on the Pecos River, otherwise known for its steep banks that made crossing difficult.

== History ==
Lancaster Crossing formed where an arroyo on the west side of the river washed out rock and gravel from a canyon in the mountains, creating low banks and a wide shallow river bottom. It was first used by the Native Americans of West Texas who crossed the Pecos on their way to and from raids on Mexico, discarding items taken from their captives at the site, giving it its early name of "Indian Ford."

The U. S. Army survey expedition of Lieutenant Colonel Joseph E. Johnston that established the San Antonio-El Paso Road in 1849 used the ford and established a ferry a mile upstream of the ford at Pecos Crossing, at a site that was used off and on for decades. This first ferry was described by Robert A. Eccleston, a civilian forty-niner travelling with that expedition on his way to California:

When I first came up I supposed the Army encampment to be on this side (east) of the river, when I was surprised by finding the River Pecos ... running close to our wagon. Were it not for the road that is cut through the bank and the tall grass that is flattened, you would be unable to discover that a river flowed here until within one or two feet of it. Not a solitary tree or clump of brush marks its course. The river is about 70 feet wide where the ferry boat crossed it. It is uniformly wide, generally, & the water of the color of prepared cacoa without milk. Its depth here is about 10 ft.; the banks are perpendicular. The water is not as unpalatable as was reported. It tastes a little saltish, but when cleared by the aid of a prickly pear, ..., it is quite drinkable. The horses & cattle seem very fond of it.

Eccleston says they crossed their wagons, draught animals and horses on the ferry with the river running 6 miles an hour, and sent their herd of cattle to swim across the river a mile down at the ford. He also mentions that some cattle swimming across the river at the ferry had to be hauled by ropes up the steep banks on the other side if they missed landing at the cut in the bank on the other side.

Today the ford lies just south of the Texas State Highway 290 bridge, which crosses the Pecos River southeast of Sheffield.
