= Texas State Highway 290 =

Highway in Texas

State Highway 290
- SH 290, highlighted in red

Route information
- Maintained by TxDOT
- Length: 24.364 mi (39.210 km)
- Existed: 1992–present

Major junctions
- West end: I-10 / SH 349 north of Sheffield
- SH 349 at Sheffield
- East end: I-10 west of Ozona

Location
- Country: United States
- State: Texas
- Counties: Pecos, Crockett

Highway system
- Highways in Texas; Interstate; US; State; Former; Toll; Loops; Spurs; FM/RM; Park; Rec
← US 290	→ SH 291

State Highway 290 (SH 290) is a state highway maintained by the Texas Department of Transportation (TxDOT) that runs from Interstate 10 near Sheffield east to another connection with I-10 about 20 miles (32 km) east of Sheffield. The 24.5-mile (39.4 km) route was designated in 1992 as a replacement for U.S. Route 290 when that route was shortened to end near Junction. The route connects I-10 to Sheffield and Fort Lancaster State Historic Site and overlays a portion of SH 349.

SH 290 was the former designation for a portion of SH 114 between the New Mexico state line and Lubbock.

== History ==
=== Cochran, Hockley, and Lubbock counties ===
SH 290 was originally designated as a route from the New Mexico state line east through Morton and Levelland to Lubbock in Cochran, Hockley, and Lubbock counties that was created on September 26, 1939. The route had been previously numbered as SH 134 beginning sometime between 1926 and 1928 until the route was renumbered as SH 24 on March 19, 1930. The SH 290 designation was dropped on March 31, 1955 when the route became SH 116. On December 14, 1977, the SH 116 designation was canceled, and the route became an extension of SH 114.

=== Pecos and Crockett counties ===
SH 290 was created on November 21, 1991 from a portion of US 290 which was decommissioned beyond its current terminus at I-10 near Junction to its former terminus at US 80 near Kent. US 290 together with US 80 formed a route linking El Paso to Austin and Houston before the construction of I-10. SH 290 is a portion of the former US 290 that was bypassed by I-10 around Sheffield.

== Route description ==
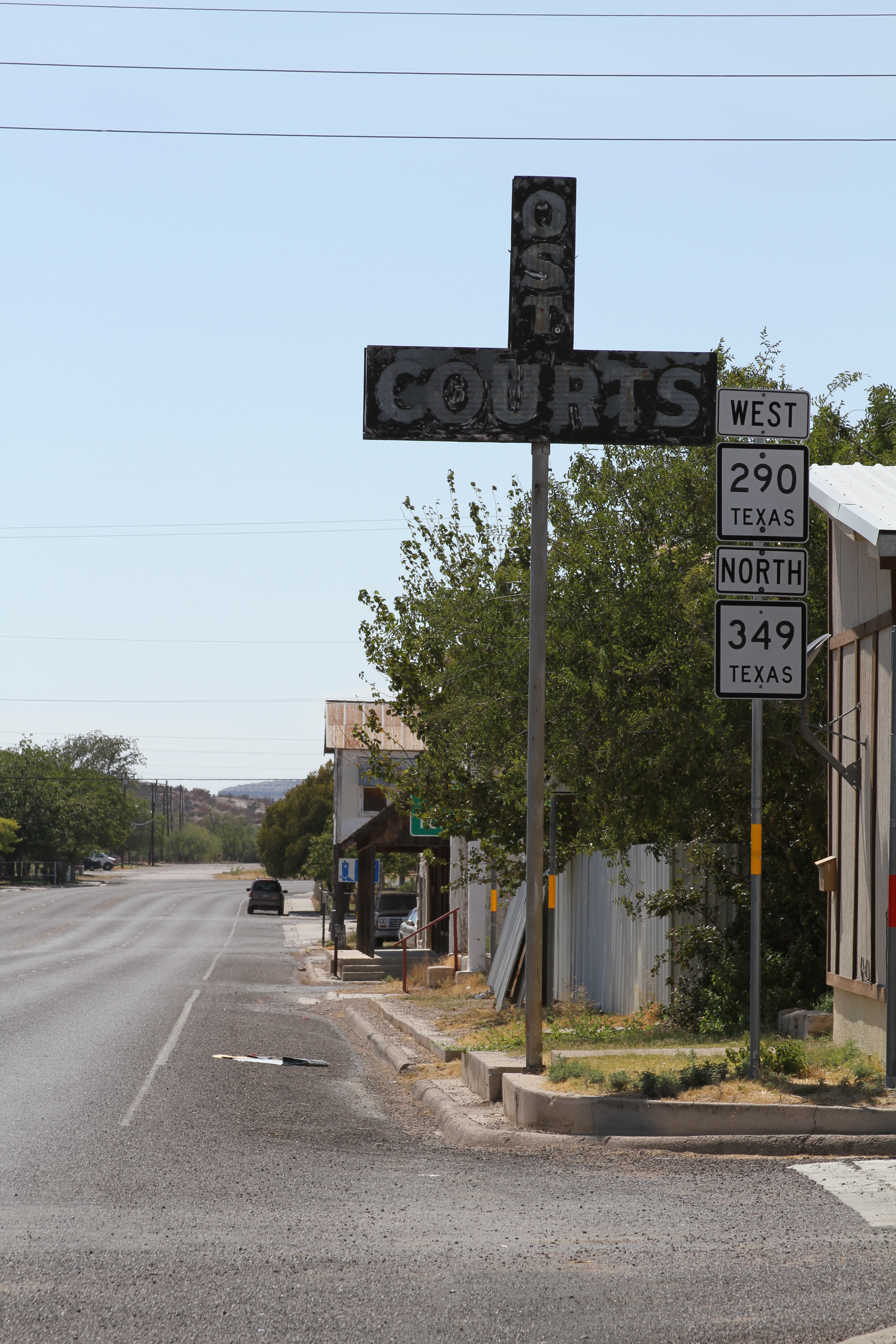
SH 290 in Sheffield

SH 290 begins at Exit 325 of I-10 in Pecos County and winds southward around hills concurrently with SH 349. The road turns east through Sheffield passing through town along Main Street where SH 349 turns to the south. SH 290 then runs southeast to the Pecos River where the road enters Crockett County. The road turns eastward along the Pecos River valley until it reaches Fort Lancaster, an old frontier Army fort maintained by the Texas Parks and Wildlife Department. The road then turns northeast climbing steeply out of the river valley and returns to I-10 at Exit 343.

== Major intersections ==
County	Location	mi	km	Destinations	Notes
Pecos		0	0.0	I-10 / SH 349 north – Fort Stockton, Iraan	I-10 exit 325; western terminus; West end of SH 349 overlap.
Pecos	Sheffield	4.8	7.7	SH 349 – Dryden	East end of SH 349 overlap.
Crockett		24.5	39.4	I-10 – Ozona	I-10 exit 343; eastern terminus.
1.000 mi = 1.609 km; 1.000 km = 0.621 mi: Concurrency terminus
