= Persimmon, Georgia =

Unincorporated community in Georgia, U.S.

Coordinates: 34°53′46″N 83°30′43″W

Persimmon is an unincorporated community in rural Rabun County, in the U.S. state of Georgia. It is the location of the James Henry and Rachel Kilby House, which is listed on the National Register of Historic Places.

== History ==
The community was so named for the persimmon trees near the original town site. A post office called Persimmon was established in 1879, and remained in operation until 1931.
