= Turkey Creek (Nueces River tributary) =

- Map

Location
- Country: United States
- State: Texas

Turkey Creek is a river with its source in Kinney County, Texas at 29°14′32″N 100°06′56″W. It passes through Uvalde and Zavala counties, then joins Soldier Slough south of Crystal City in Dimmit County, Texas. Soldier Slough continues for approximately 20 miles before joining the Nueces River.

== History ==
Turkey Creek, near Cline, Texas in western Uvalde County, was a watering stop and crossing place on the San Antonio-El Paso Road 9.04 miles west of crossing on the Nueces River and 15.23 miles from its crossing of Elm Creek. From 1871 to the 1881 the Turkey Creek Stage Stop was located near the crossing, run by Celeste Pingenot, who also had a store and saloon there, This became the town of Turkey Creek, then Wallace before being changed to Cline shortly after the Texas and New Orleans Railroad arrived there.
