= Las Moras Mountain =

Mountain in Texas, United States

Coordinates: 29°21′24″N 100°23′19″W

Las Moras Mountain, is a summit in the Texas Hill Country four miles northeast of Brackettville in Kinney County, Texas. It stands at an elevation of 1676 feet.
