= Mud Creek (Kinney County, Texas) =

Stream in Kinney County, Texas, U.S.

Mud Creek, originally known as Maverick Creek, is a stream in Kinney County, Texas tributary to Sycamore Creek and the Rio Grande. It has its source at 29°28′10″N 100°36′24″W.

Maverick Creek was a water and camping place on the San Antonio-El Paso Road.

== See also ==
- List of rivers of Texas

== In popular culture ==
The 2002 comedy horror film Bubba Ho-Tep is set in Mud Creek, Texas.
