= Las Moras Springs =

Group of springs near Brackettville, Texas, USA

- Location within Texas
- Interactive map of Las Moras Springs
- Name origin: Álvar Núñez Cabeza de Vaca; Gaspar Castaño de Sosa
- Location: Fort Clark, Brackettville, Texas
- Coordinates: 29°18′35″N 100°25′16″W
- Elevation: 1,096 feet (334 m)
- Discharge: Daily average: 12–14 million US gallons (45×10^{6}–53×10^{6} L)
- Temperature: 68 °F (20 °C)

Las Moras Springs,"The Mulberries" in Spanish, are a group of springs near Brackettville in Kinney County, Texas.

Las Moras Springs are located on the grounds of Fort Clark in Brackettville and were the reason for the location of the fort and the settlement there. The springs are the ninth largest group of springs in Texas, discharging an average of about 12-14 million gallons per day. They are artesian springs arising from a fault overlying the Edwards limestone. It emerges at an elevation of about 1,096 feet.

The springs fill a large walled-in area, some of which spills into a 300-foot-long swimming pool. Its excess flows into a bypass channel around the pool. Below the pool, both discharges combine and form the headwaters of the section of Las Moras Creek that flows year around to the Rio Grande.
