= Persimmon Gap =

- South Pass
- Location within Texas
- Elevation: 902 m (2,959 ft)
- Traversed by: US 385

Third Approach
- Location: Brewster County, Texas, United States
- Range: Santiago Mountains
- Coordinates: 29°40′06″N 103°10′15″W

Persimmon Gap is a mountain pass located in Big Bend National Park in Texas.

It is traversed by U.S. Highway 385.

== Climate ==
- Coordinates: 29.66028°N 103.17361°W
- Elevation: 2,865 feet (873 m)

The hottest temperature recorded in Persimmon Gap was 113 °F (45.0 °C) on June 18, 2017, while the coldest temperature recorded was 4 °F (−15.6 °C) on December 23, 1989.

Climate data for Persimmon Gap, Texas, 1991–2020 normals, extremes 1967–present
Month	Jan	Feb	Mar	Apr	May	Jun	Jul	Aug	Sep	Oct	Nov	Dec	Year
Record high °F (°C)	88 (31)	95 (35)	102 (39)	105 (41)	110 (43)	113 (45)	110 (43)	111 (44)	108 (42)	101 (38)	96 (36)	88 (31)	113 (45)
Mean maximum °F (°C)	81.9 (27.7)	87.2 (30.7)	92.9 (33.8)	98.9 (37.2)	104.4 (40.2)	107.2 (41.8)	104.8 (40.4)	103.0 (39.4)	100.0 (37.8)	96.0 (35.6)	88.5 (31.4)	81.5 (27.5)	108.2 (42.3)
Mean daily maximum °F (°C)	64.5 (18.1)	70.3 (21.3)	77.9 (25.5)	86.2 (30.1)	93.5 (34.2)	98.1 (36.7)	96.9 (36.1)	96.5 (35.8)	90.3 (32.4)	83.7 (28.7)	72.9 (22.7)	65.2 (18.4)	83.0 (28.3)
Daily mean °F (°C)	49.0 (9.4)	53.7 (12.1)	61.4 (16.3)	69.6 (20.9)	78.2 (25.7)	84.4 (29.1)	84.9 (29.4)	84.4 (29.1)	78.0 (25.6)	69.1 (20.6)	57.6 (14.2)	49.7 (9.8)	68.3 (20.2)
Mean daily minimum °F (°C)	33.4 (0.8)	37.2 (2.9)	44.9 (7.2)	53.1 (11.7)	62.9 (17.2)	70.7 (21.5)	73.0 (22.8)	72.3 (22.4)	65.8 (18.8)	54.5 (12.5)	42.2 (5.7)	34.2 (1.2)	53.7 (12.1)
Mean minimum °F (°C)	23.0 (−5.0)	25.5 (−3.6)	31.6 (−0.2)	39.7 (4.3)	50.4 (10.2)	62.6 (17.0)	67.3 (19.6)	66.1 (18.9)	54.5 (12.5)	38.8 (3.8)	29.0 (−1.7)	22.8 (−5.1)	19.7 (−6.8)
Record low °F (°C)	11 (−12)	10 (−12)	17 (−8)	29 (−2)	39 (4)	55 (13)	62 (17)	61 (16)	44 (7)	28 (−2)	18 (−8)	4 (−16)	4 (−16)
Average precipitation inches (mm)	0.43 (11)	0.33 (8.4)	0.35 (8.9)	0.51 (13)	1.06 (27)	1.40 (36)	1.83 (46)	1.65 (42)	1.58 (40)	0.79 (20)	0.54 (14)	0.38 (9.7)	10.85 (276)
Average snowfall inches (cm)	0.2 (0.51)	0.0 (0.0)	0.0 (0.0)	0.0 (0.0)	0.0 (0.0)	0.0 (0.0)	0.0 (0.0)	0.0 (0.0)	0.0 (0.0)	0.0 (0.0)	0.1 (0.25)	0.3 (0.76)	0.6 (1.52)
Average precipitation days (≥ 0.01 in)	2.9	2.4	2.3	2.3	4.9	5.0	5.2	5.6	5.1	4.0	3.2	2.8	45.7
Average snowy days (≥ 0.1 in)	0.1	0.0	0.0	0.0	0.0	0.0	0.0	0.0	0.0	0.0	0.1	0.1	0.3
Source 1: NOAA
Source 2: National Weather Service
