= Robert A. Eccleston =

American pioneer (1830–1911)

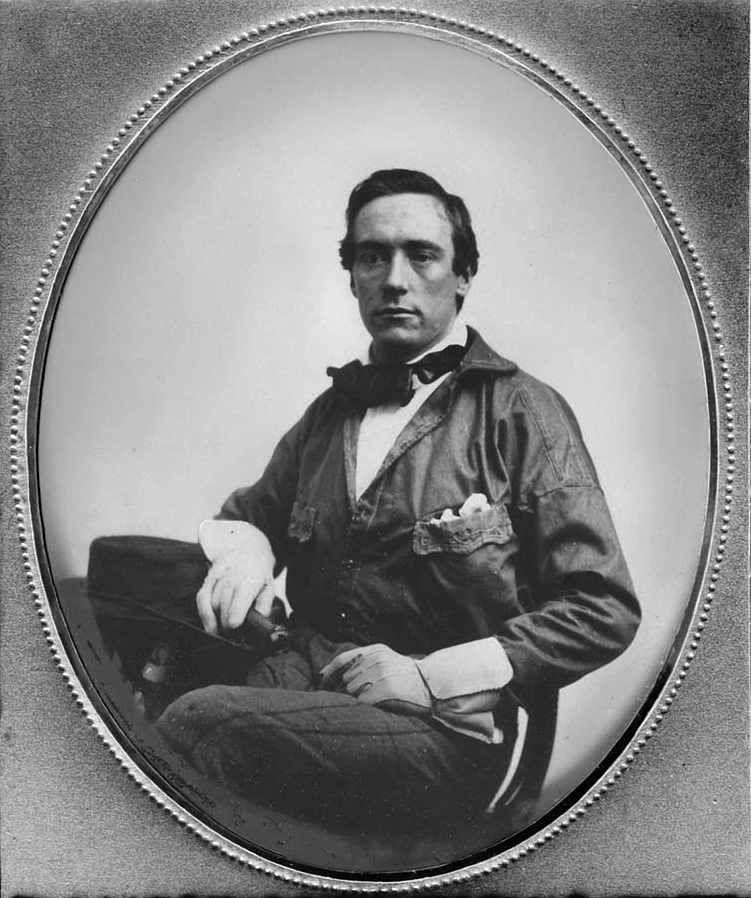
- Born: March 4, 1830; New York City, New York
- Died: February 1, 1911 (aged 80); Oakland, California

Robert A. Eccleston (1830-1911), pioneer, forty-niner, diarist who recorded the discovery of the Tucson Cutoff and Yosemite Valley.

== Early life and the California Gold Rush ==
Eccleston was born in New York City, on March 4, 1830, one of ten children of Irish immigrants Edward Eccleston and Mary Anne Christie. In Spring of 1849, at the beginning of the California Gold Rush, Robert with his older brother Edward Eccleston joined the Fremont Association formed to travel to California and mine gold there. The Association traveled by sea to Texas and then purchased wagons for an overland journey with a U. S. Army expedition to establish a military road from San Antonio to El Paso. The Association then joined with John Coffee Hays and his experienced party of frontiersmen for the journey from El Paso to California. Robert kept a diary of this journey from April 3, 1849, when they sailed from New York, to December 27, 1849, when they reached the borders of California at Fort Yuma. In this book he records of how the Tucson Cutoff was found and first traveled by his party.

== Life in the mines and the Mariposa Indian War ==
Months later, Eccleston's diary began again in the southern placer mines at Agua Frio, on October 20, 1850. It describes life in the mines and his experience of the 1850–1851 Mariposa Indian War fought in the Sierra Nevada Mountains. In it he also recorded the discovery of the Yosemite Valley by one of the militia columns marching against the mountain tribes.

== Family life and later years ==
On September 17, 1857, Eccleston married Emily Josephine Young in Colusa and had their first child there. By 1861 they were in New York, where they had their second child. Returning to California after 1861 he settled down on a ranch to have several children in Forbestown, California.

In 1870, Eccleston had taken his family back east to New Jersey where one of his children was born. Eccleston went to Arizona later in 1870, where for three years he was Indian agent for the Gila Pima Reservation. One of his sons was born in Tucson in 1879, and another in Tombstone, Arizona in 1881. There, Eccleston was considered one of the founders of Tombstone, and was present at the time of the "Gunfight at the OK Corral". In 1885, Eccleston moved to Oregon, where he lived until 1900, when he settled in Oakland, California where he died on February 1, 1911.

In 1950, his diary of his 1849 travels was published as Overland to California on the Southwestern Trail 1849. His account of his time in the goldfields and the Mariposa Indian War was published in 1957 as The Mariposa Indian War 1850–1851.
