= Elm Creek (Nueces River tributary) =

River in Texas, United States

Coordinates: 28°53′35″N 100°10′39″W

- Map

Location
- Country: United States
- State: Texas

See Elm Creek (Rio Grande tributary) for the tributary of the Rio Grande, in Maverick County, Texas.

Elm Creek is one of two similarly named streams in Kinney County, Texas, and Maverick County, Texas. Elm Creek is a tributary of the Nueces River via Chacon Creek, where it empties in conjunction with Salado Creek. Its source is in Kinney County, Texas, in the Texas Hill Country northeast of Brackettville.
