= San Felipe Creek (Texas) =

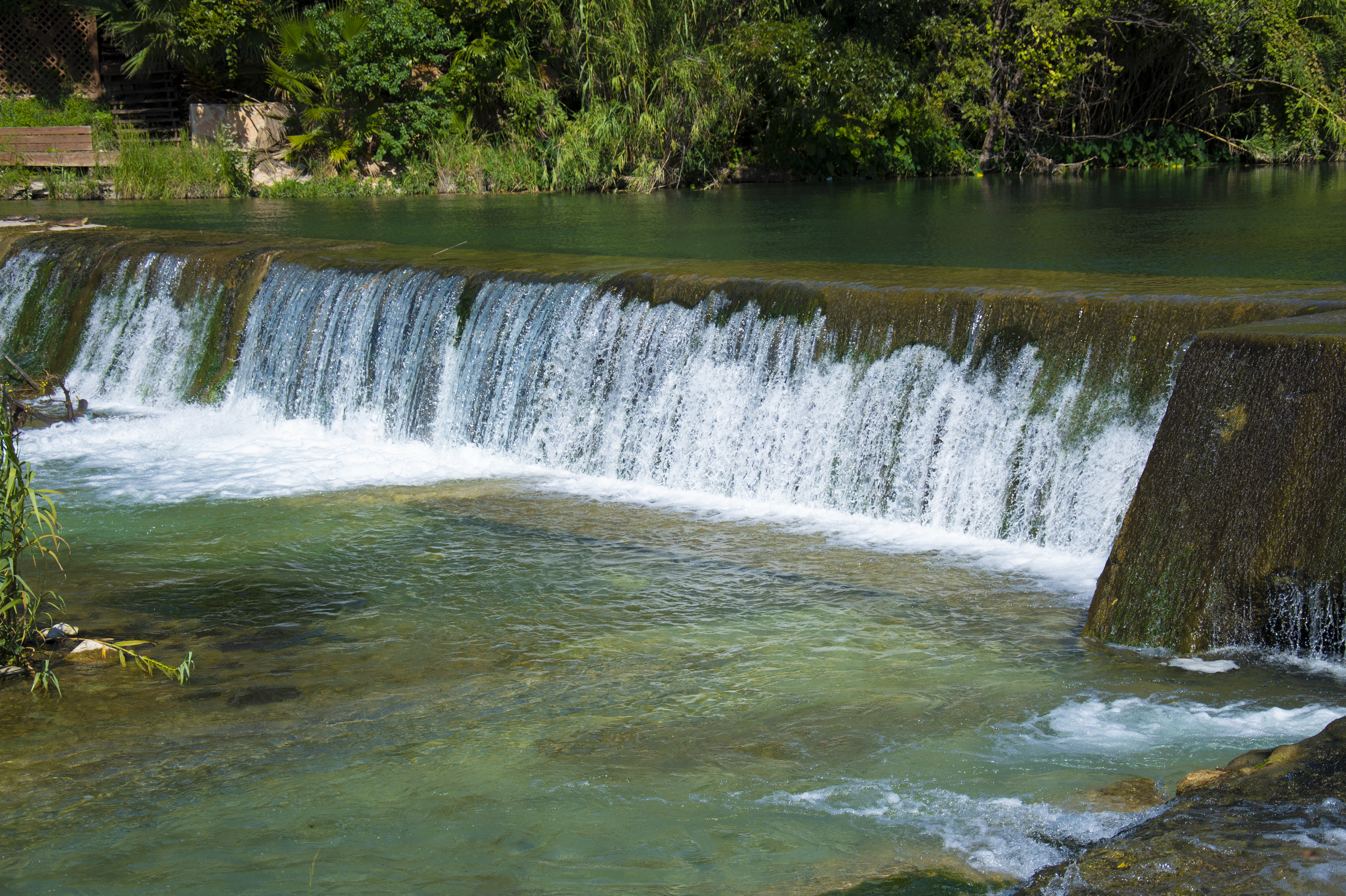
- Creek at Lions Park

Location
- Country: United States

Physical characteristics
- Source: San Felipe Springs
  - coordinates: 29°22′24″N 100°52′58″W
  - elevation: 961 ft
- Mouth: Rio Grande
- Length: 18 mi (29 km)

San Felipe Creek is a spring-fed stream that flows through Del Rio, Texas. It originates from the San Felipe Springs, the fourth largest spring system in Texas, and flows for eighteen miles before emptying into the Rio Grande below the Amistad Dam. In this otherwise arid area, the creek is the only source of potable water for Del Rio and Laughlin Air Force Base and serves as a primary hub for local recreation.

== Course and hydrology ==
San Felipe Creek originates from a series of ten or more springs, known collectively as the San Felipe Springs, located about three miles northeast of downtown Del Rio at an elevation of 961 ft. These springs emerge from the Edwards Aquifer along the Balcones Escarpment and discharge from 50 to 90 million gallons of water per day on average (approximately 77 to 139 cfs). The creek flows southwest for eighteen miles through the center of Del Rio, carving a valley through limestone, shale, and clay before its confluence with the Rio Grande.

== History ==
Archeological evidence shows that the creek and its springs have been a vital water source for human inhabitants for thousands of years. Spanish missionaries arrived in 1635 on Saint Philip's Day and named the creek after the saint. A mission, San Felipe del Rio, was established in 1808. A military outpost for Fort Clark at Brackettville, Camp San Felipe, was set up in 1857 and reestablished as San Felipe del Rio after the Civil War. The first permanent settlement, which would later become Del Rio, dates back to 1862.

In 1868, the San Felipe Agricultural, Manufacturing and Irrigation Company was founded. The company dammed the creek and created a canal system to irrigate several thousand acres of land, a system that remains in use today. Over the years, the creek has also been used to power gristmills, ice plants, and early electric power plants for the community.

In August 1998, remnants of Tropical Storm Charley stalled over the area, producing up to 15 inches of rain and sending a massive flood down San Felipe Creek. The flood killed nine people, destroyed 200 homes, and caused widespread damage to the neighborhoods adjoining the creek. As a result, the City of Del Rio, with assistance from the FEMA, purchased over 275 acres of flood-prone properties along the creek to be maintained as open space.

== Ecology ==
The constant flow of high-quality spring water creates a unique and diverse ecosystem. The creek bed is mostly rocky and gravelly, supporting native riparian vegetation such as pecans, oaks, junipers, and mesquites.

=== Threatened species ===
San Felipe Creek provides a critical habitat for several threatened species:

- The Devils River minnow (Dionda diaboli), listed as a threatened species by the U.S. Fish & Wildlife Service since 1999.
- The San Felipe gambusia (Gambusia sanfelipensis), a fish species endemic to San Felipe Creek. Texas Parks and Wildlife Department had declared it as threatened.

=== Invasive species ===
The creek's ecosystem is under pressure from several invasive species:

- Arundo donax (Giant Reed or River Cane) is a significant problem, consuming large amounts of water and out-competing native vegetation along the banks.
- The armored catfish Hypostomus plecostomus is present throughout the creek. Their burrowing habits contribute to bank erosion and instability, which negatively impacts water quality by increasing suspended sediment. They also compete with native species for food and habitat.

== Recreation ==
San Felipe Creek serves as a primary recreation attraction for the community of Del Rio. The city maintains numerous parks along its banks, including Moore Park, Rotary Park, and Brown Plaza. A popular feature is the Mayor Dora Alcala Hike and Bike Trail, which runs along the creek for over a mile through the city's park system.
