= San Antonio–El Paso Road =

Historic road in Texas, United States

The San Antonio–El Paso Road, also known as the Lower Emigrant Road or Military Road, was an economically important trade route between the Texas cities of San Antonio and El Paso between 1849 and 1882. Mail, freight, and passengers traveled by horse and wagon along this road across the Edwards Plateau and dangerous Trans-Pecos region of West Texas.

The "Upper Emigrant Road" originated at Austin and skirted the north of the Edwards Plateau. It intersected the Lower Road near Comanche Springs west of Horsehead Crossing of the Pecos River.

In 1848, businessmen in San Antonio hired John Coffee Hays to find a route to El Paso. Hays and a squad of Texas Rangers spent three and a half months on their quest, but only made it as far as Presidio due to lack of food and water.

By 1849, gold seekers wishing to get to California to stake claims were arriving in Texas and looking for opportunities to travel west. Brevet Major General William J. Worth ordered Lieutenant William H.C. Whiting and Lieutenant William Farrar Smith to find a suitable route to El Paso. They were to follow Hays' trail to Presidio and continue up the Rio Grande to El Paso. The team made it to El Paso, but believed the route was unsatisfactory. On the return trip, they traveled down the Rio Grande for 100 miles, then headed east for the Pecos River. They followed the Pecos to Devils River and the Devils back to the Rio Grande. From there, they headed east to San Antonio.

Brevet Brigadier General William S. Harney, commanding the Army in Texas after General Worth's death in the San Antonio cholera epidemic, ordered Lieutenant Smith to accompany Lieutenant Colonel Joseph E. Johnston on another survey expedition to El Paso. The survey party was escorted by a company of the First Infantry. Also, six companies of the Third Infantry and a group of California-bound immigrants accompanied them. One of these Forty-niners, Robert Eccleston, wrote a journal describing incidents of the journey and the land they passed over, with the mileage, each day along the route. The trail they followed to El Paso differed only slightly from Whiting and Smith's return route. This trail became known as the Lower or Military Road, and then the San Antonio–El Paso Road.

"In 1850, the largest supply train to use the road" left Fort Inge for El Paso with 340 wagons, 4000 animals, 450 civilians, and 175 soldiers.

To protect people and supplies along the road from Indians and bandits, the Army constructed a series of fortifications: These included Fort Inge (1849–1869), Fort Clark (1852–1944), Fort Lancaster (1855–1862, 1867–1874), Fort Stockton (1859–1862, 1867–1886), Fort Davis (1854–1862, 1867–1891), Fort Quitman (1858–1861, 1868–1877, 1880–1882), and Fort Bliss (1849–). The road was used for the San Antonio-El Paso Mail from 1851–1862 and 1866–1882, and as part of the San Antonio-San Diego Mail Line route in 1857–1858. The Butterfield Overland Mail began using the Lower Road from Fort Stockton to El Paso in 1859–1861.

== 1859 table of distances along the San Antonio-El Paso Road ==
These distances were measured from one station or watering place to another from starting point.

- San Antonio to Leon River, 6.53 miles
- Leon river to Castroville, on the Medina River, 18.0 miles
- Castroville to D'Hanis Seco River, 25.28 miles
- D'Hanis to Rancheros Creek, 8.38 miles
- Ranchero Creek to Sabinal River, 3.94 miles
- Sabinal Creek to Camanche Creek, 5.0 miles
- Camanche Creek to Rio Frio, 8.46 miles
- Rio Frio to head of Leona River, "Uvalde", Fort Inge 6.08 miles
- Uvalde to Nueces River, 9.04 miles
- Nueces to Turkey Creek, 10.27 miles
- Turkey Creek to Elm Creek, 15.23 miles
- Elm Creek to Las Moras River, Fort Clarke, 7.13 miles / 123.34 miles

---

- Fort Clarke to Piedra Pinto, 7.0 miles
- Piedra Pinto to Maverick Creek, 8.86 miles
- Maverick Creek to San Felipe Springs, 12.61 miles
- San Felipe to first crossing of San Pedro or Devil's River, 10.22 miles
- First Crossing to Painted Caves, 2.54 miles
- Painted Caves to California Spring, 15.73 miles
- California Spring to Willow Spring, 2 miles
- Willow Spring to Fort Hudson, and second crossing Pedro or Devil's River, 16.39 miles / 75.35 miles

---

- Fort Hudson to head of San Pedro or Devil's River, 19.50 miles
- Head of river to Howard Springs, 44 miles
- Howard Springs to Live Oak Creek, 30.44 miles
- Live Oak creek to Fort Lancaster, 3 miles /96.94 miles

---

- Fort Lancaster to Pecos Crossing, 4.29 miles
- Pecos Crossing to Pecos Spring, 6 miles
- Pecos Spring to Leaving of Pecos, 32.26 miles
- Leaving of Pecos to Arroyo Escondido, 16.26 miles
- Arroyo Escondido to Escondido Spring, 8.58 miles
- Escondido Spring to Comanche Springs, 19.40 miles
- Comanche Spring to Leon Hole, 8.88 miles
- Leon Hole to Hackberry Pond, 11 miles
- Hackberry pond to Limpia Creek, 32 miles
- Limpia creek to Fort Davis, 18.86 miles /157.99 miles

---

- Fort Davis to Point of Rocks, 10 miles
- Point of Rocks to Barrel Springs, 8.42 miles
- Barrel Springs to Deadman's Hole, 13.58 miles
- Deadman's Hole to Van Horn's Wells, 32.83 miles
- Van Horn's Wells to Eagle Springs, 19.74 miles
- Eagle Springs to first camp on Rio Grande, 31.42 miles
- First camp on Rio Grande to Birchville, 35 miles / 150.99 miles

---

- Birchville to San Eleazario, 24.8 miles
- San Eleazario to Socorro, 5.45 miles
- Socorro to Isletta, 3.1 miles
- Isletta to El Paso, Fort Bliss 14.14 miles / 47.49 miles
