= Pecos Canyon =

Location
- Country: United States

Physical characteristics
- Source
  - location: Val Verde County, Texas
- Mouth
  - location: Devils River
  - elevation: 1,722 ft (525 m)

Pecos Canyon, is a tributary of the Devils River in Val Verde County, Texas. It has its source at 30°16′17″N 101°09′13″W, 8.6 miles north northwest of Juno, Texas.

In the 19th century, the place where the Devils River had its confluence with the creek at the mouth of Pecos Canyon was called the Head of Devil's River. At this point the San Antonio-El Paso Road left the Devils River to go northwest, 44 miles across Johnson Draw, Government Canyon and Howard Draw to Howard Spring, then 30.44 miles on to Live Oak Creek and Fort Lancaster, 3 miles further on at the Pecos River.

== See also ==
- List of rivers of Texas
