= Howard Draw =

Location
- Country: United States

Physical characteristics
- Source
  - location: Reagan County, Texas
  - elevation: 2,720 ft (830 m)
- Mouth
  - location: Pecos River, Val Verde County, Texas
  - elevation: 1,575 ft (480 m)

Howard Draw is a valley that heads in the extreme south of Reagan County, Texas at an elevation of 2720 feet at 30°05′09″N 101°22′27″W, and runs through Crockett County to its foot on the Pecos River in Val Verde County, elevation 1575 feet.

Howard Draw is also a stream or arroyo, formerly known as Howard Creek it is an ephemeral stream within Howard Draw, tributary to the Pecos River in Texas. The historical Howard Springs, and an important waterhole on the San Antonio-El Paso Road were located in Howard Creek just above Government Canyon in Howard Draw.

Howard Draw was 44 miles along the route the San Antonio-El Paso Road took northwestward to the Pecos River after it left the Head of Devil's River at Pecos Canyon, crossing Johnson Draw, Government Canyon to Howard Draw and Howard Springs. It was 30.44 miles on to Live Oak Creek and Fort Lancaster, 3 miles further on at the Pecos River.

== See also ==
- List of rivers of Texas
