= Head of Devil's River =

River confluence in Pecos Canyon, Texas

Coordinates: 30°10′42″N 101°05′22″W

Head of Devil's River, a place on the Devils River, where it has its confluence with Pecos Canyon at an elevation of 1722 feet, below Beaver Lake, nineteen and a half miles above the second crossing of Devils River. Here the San Antonio-El Paso Road left the Devils River to go northwest, 44 miles across Johnson Draw, Government Canyon and Howard Draw to Howard Springs, then 30.44 miles on to Live Oak Creek and Fort Lancaster, 3 miles further near the Pecos River.
