= Ozona =

Ozona may refer to:

- Ozona, Florida, an unincorporated community
- Ozona, Texas, an unincorporated community, census-designated place and county seat
  - Ozona High School
  - Ozona Municipal Airport - see List of airports by IATA airport code: O
- Ozona Air Force Station, a former US Air Force radar station east of Ozona, Texas
- Ozona, a 2004 EP and a 2005 album by the English rock band Goldrush
