= Martin Guevara Urbina =

Doctor Martin Guevara Urbina
- Martin Guevara Urbina
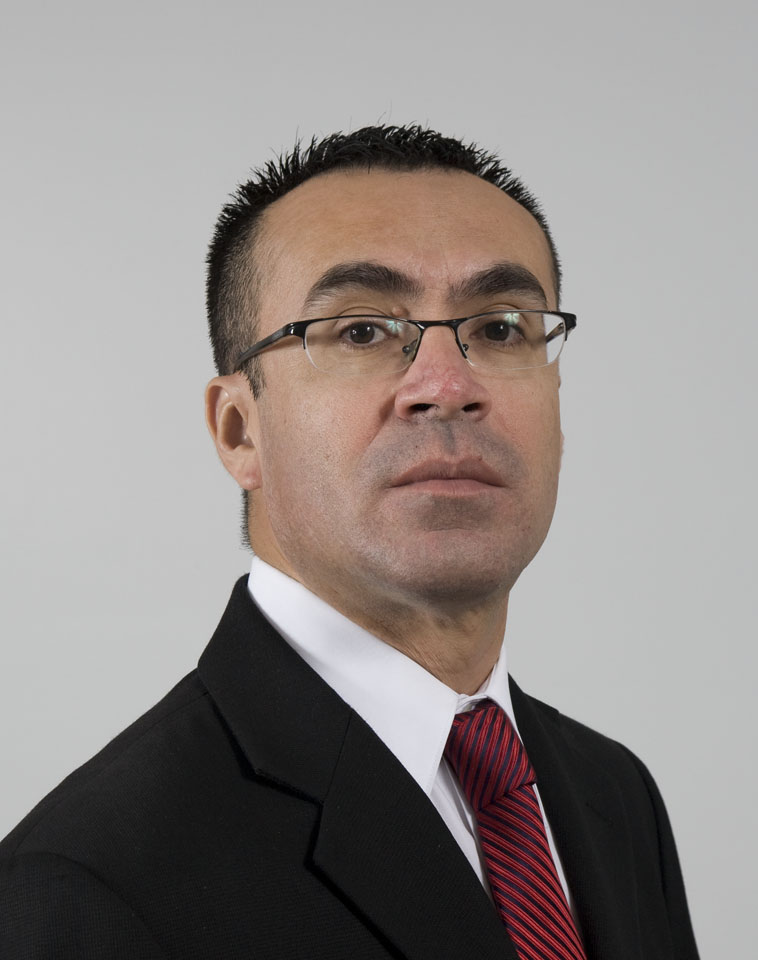
- Martin Guevara Urbina in 2011.
- Born: San Miguel de Allende, Guanajuato, Mexico
- Education: Western Texas College; Sul Ross State University (B.S.); New Mexico State University (M.C.J.); Western Michigan University (Ph.D.)
- Occupations: Author, scientist
- Writing career
- Subjects: Sociology, Criminal Justice
- Website: www.martinguevaraurbina.com

Martin Guevara Urbina (1972) is a Mexican-born American author, writer, researcher, professor, and speaker who, as a sociologist and criminologist, works on Latina and Latino issues in the United States.

== Biography ==
Urbina was born (February 25, 1972) in San Miguel de Allende, Guanajuato, Mexico to Felipa Guevara and Salvador Urbina. At the age of seven, he was taken to the United States, spending his childhood in various places in Texas before settling in Ozona, Texas in 1982.

In 1980, he entered the first grade in Carta Valley, Texas, moving to Ozona, Texas in 1982, during his fourth grade year; he later attended the Rocksprings, Texas High School, and eventually graduated from Ozona High School in 1991.

He then attended Western Texas College in Snyder, Texas, transferring in 1993 to Sul Ross State University in Alpine, Texas, where he graduated with a Bachelor of Science degree in 1995. While at Sul Ross he studied under Felipe de Ortego y Gasca, considered the principal scholar of the Chicano Renaissance and founder of Chicano literary history with his book Backgrounds of Mexican American Literature (1971). Influenced by Ortego, he pursued graduate studies at New Mexico State University, where he graduated with a master's degree (M.C.J.) in 1997. At New Mexico, he started researching the sociological elements of the U.S. judicial system. In the summer of 1997, he began further graduate work at Western Michigan University, graduating with a PhD in sociology in 2000. At Western Michigan, he began to examine the implications, utility, and significance of various social issues in research and publication, especially in the areas of race and ethnic relations, capital punishment, law and society, and social justice. While at Western Michigan, he began formulating his theory on the scope and nature of the death penalty, "the four-threat theory of death sentence outcomes," as published in his first book, Capital Punishment and Latino Offenders: Racial and Ethnic Differences in Death Sentences (2003).

== Academic career ==
He then took a faculty position at the University of Wisconsin–Milwaukee, where he developed a research agenda with a focus on ethnicity, race, gender, and other social issues."

Since 2000, he has analyzed ethnic, racial, gender, and socioeconomic disparities in the U.S. criminal justice system, as affected by national and international social control wars, like the war on crime, the war on narcotics (drugs), the war on immigrants, and more recently the war on terrorism.

Urbina is author, coauthor, or editor of over 60 scholarly publications including several academic books. His research has been published in national and international academic journals, to include Justice Quarterly; Critical Criminology: An International Journal; and Social Justice: A Journal of Crime, Conflict & World Order.

=== Books ===
- Latino Access to Higher Education: Ethnic Realities and New Directions for the Twenty-First Century (2016). ISBN 978-0398090913
- Twenty-First Century Dynamics of Multiculturalism: Beyond Post-Racial America (2014). ISBN 978-0398080983
- Ethnic Realities of Mexican Americans: From Colonialism to 21st Century Globalization (2014). ISBN 978-0-398-08780-7
- Capital Punishment in America: Race and the Death Penalty Over Time (2012). ISBN 978-1593324452
  - Reviewed by - R. D. McCrie in Choice Dec 2012
- Hispanics in the U.S. Criminal Justice System: The New American Demography (2012). ISBN 978-0398088156; ISBN 978-0398088163
- Capital Punishment and Latino Offenders: Racial and Ethnic Differences in Death Sentences (2011). ISBN 978-1593324940
- A Comprehensive Study of Female Offenders: Life Before, During, and After Incarceration (2008). ISBN 978-0398078119; ISBN 978-0398078126
  - Reviewed by Douglas L Yearwood in : Critical Criminology, 17, no. 3 (2009): 217-219 "
- Capital Punishment and Latino Offenders: Racial and Ethnic Differences in Death Sentences (2003). ISBN 978-1931202602

== Faculty/teaching positions ==
- Professor of Criminal Justice. Sul Ross State University/Rio Grande College. Fall 2013—Present.
- Associate Professor of Criminal Justice. Sul Ross State University/Rio Grande College. Fall 2009—Summer 2013.
- Associate Professor of Criminal Justice. Texas A&M University—Central Texas. Spring 2009—Summer 2009.
- Professor of Sociology. Howard College. Fall 2006—Fall 2008.
- Associate Professor of Criminal Justice. University of Wisconsin—Milwaukee. Fall 2005—Spring 2006.
- Assistant Professor of Criminal Justice. University of Wisconsin—Milwaukee. Fall 2000—Summer 2005.
- Instructor of Sociology. Western Michigan University. Fall 1997–Spring 2000.
- Instructor of Criminal Justice. New Mexico State University. Spring 1996–Summer 1997.
