= Howard Springs (Crockett County, Texas) =

Historical spring in Howard Draw

Coordinates: 30°28′31″N 101°28′31″W

Howard Springs, was a historical spring, located in the stream channel of Howard Draw at an elevation of 2031 feet, just north of the mouth of Government Canyon at its confluence with Howard Draw in what is now Crockett County, Texas.

== History ==
Howard Springs was an important watering hole for Native Americans in the dry country between Devils River and the Pecos River. Later it was the only reliable water on the San Antonio-El Paso Road between the Head of Devil's River 44 miles to the southeast and Live Oak Creek 30.44 miles to the northwest near Fort Lancaster on the Pecos River.

Its early appearance was described by Robert A. Eccleston, one of a party of forty-niners traveling with the U. S. Army expedition that established the San Antonio-El Paso Road in 1849. In Eccleston's diary of that trip he writes about the spring where they camped on August 2–3, 1849:

The water...where we took it from, it was impregnated with vegetable matters that it was hardly fit to drink. The hills that surrounded this valley are all nearly the same height & uniformly flat, upon the top. This place had formerly been a great Indian rendevous, [sic] as bones of all kinds of beasts were strewn about. Even the wood I gathered for our fire had formed a kind of tent or covering.

On July 8, 1857, Edward Fitzgerald Beale wrote:

Howard's spring is a small hole containing, apparently, about a quarter of a barrel of water, but in reality inexhaustible. It is directly under a bluff of rock in the bed of a dry creek, and to get at the water it is necessary to descend about eight feet by rude steps cut in the rock; the water has to be passed up in buckets, and the animals watered from them. There is but little grass here, and no timber but greasewood and mesquite, and not much of that; a few stunted cedars that grow around the bluff of the spring are neither large enough for shade or fuel.

A favorite living place, native tribes fought bitterly to control these springs, killing many teamsters and settlers in the vicinity as late as 1872.

Beale continued:

This place seems to have been famous for Indian surprises. Near it we passed the graves of seven who had been killed by the savages, and still nearer, within a hundred yards or so, the bones of a sergeant and some two or three dragoons, who were here killed by them. The bodies had, apparently, been disinterred by animals, and the ghastly remains of the poor fellows who had perished there were scattered on the ground. Captain Lee (U. S. army) gave us the history of the fight, which occurred some months ago.

Later local ranchers overgrazed the region, killing off the formerly abundant ground cover, increasing the force of runoff, which then washed gravel into the springs and filled them up, and changing the course of the stream bed. Seeps still emerge beneath the surface of a nearby 200-meter-long pond in Howard Draw. Oilfield drilling recently has contaminated this water.
