= Crockett County Consolidated Common School District =

School district in Texas

Address
- 611 Ave D Ozona, Texas, 76943; United States

District information
- Grades: PK–12
- Schools: 3
- NCES District ID: 4815690

Students and staff
- Students: 651 (2023–24)
- Teachers: 64.21 (on an FTE basis)
- Student–teacher ratio: 10/14:1

Other information
- Website: www.ozonaschools.net

Crockett County Consolidated Common School District is a public school district based in the community of Ozona, Texas, United States. The district's boundaries parallel that of Crockett County.

== Schools ==
- Ozona High School (grades 9–12)
- Ozona Middle (grades 6–8)
- Ozona Elementary (grades PK–5)
