= Mobile, Texas =

Ghost town in the United States

Coordinates: 30.9251°N 94.4798°W

Mobile is a ghost town in Crockett County, Texas, United States. It maintained a post office during 1880 and 1881.
