= Hembrie, Texas =

Coordinates: 30.7336°N 101.7423°W

Hembrie is a ghost town in Crockett County, Texas, United States. It was named for the family of the area's first Postmaster, but by 1902 was also known as Nix's Ranch. It maintained a post office from 1890 until 1911, as well as a school during the same time period.
