= Sutton County, Texas =

County in Texas, United States

- County
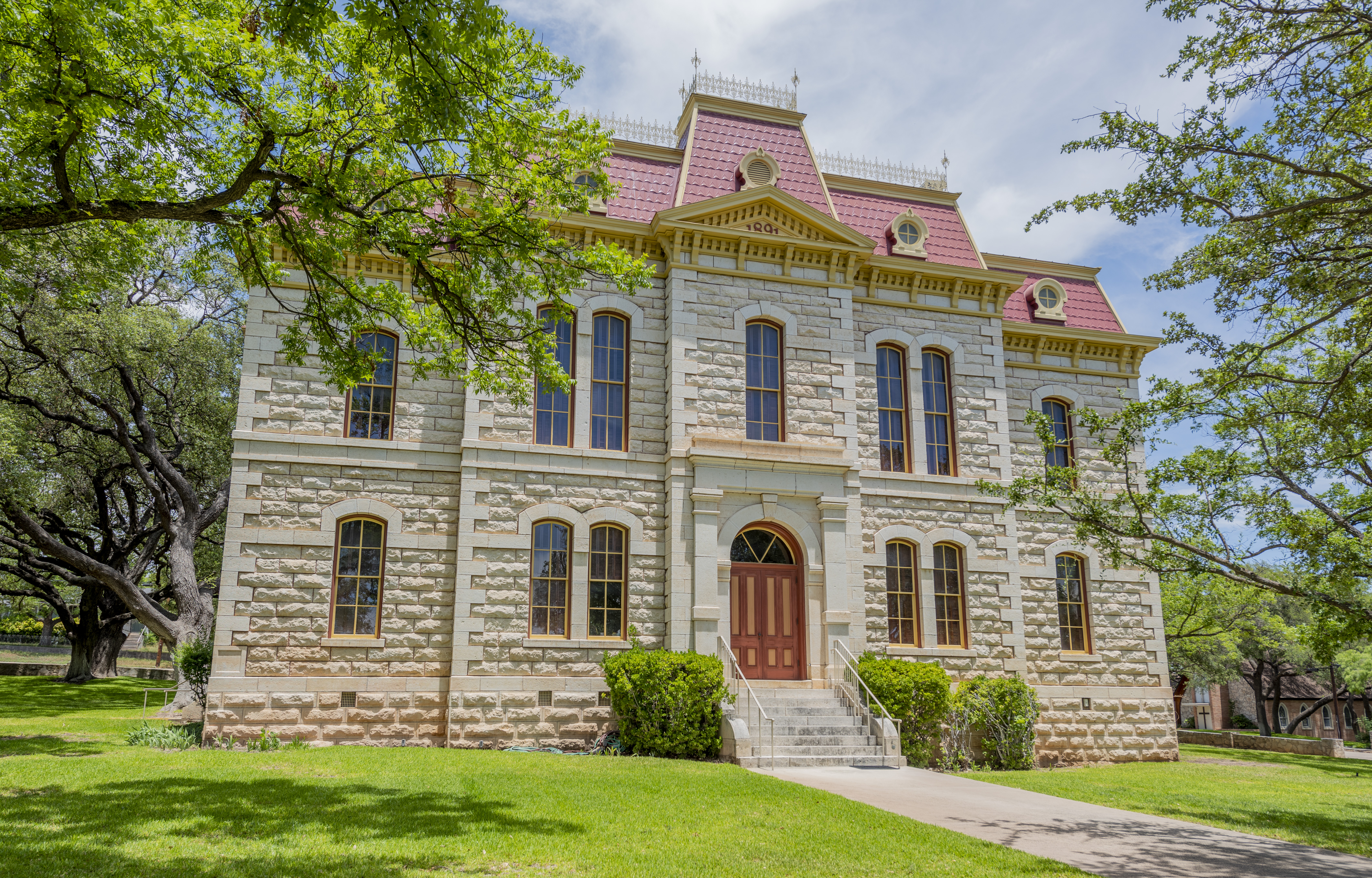
- The Sutton County Courthouse in Sonora

- Location within the U.S. state of Texas
- Coordinates: 30°30′N 100°32′W
- Country: United States
- State: Texas
- Founded: 1890
- Named for: John S. Sutton
- Seat: Sonora
- Largest city: Sonora

Area
  - Total: 1,454 sq mi (3,770 km^{2})
  - Land: 1,454 sq mi (3,770 km^{2})
  - Water: 0.5 sq mi (1.3 km^{2}) 0.03%

Population (2020)
  - Total: 3,372
  - Estimate (2025): 3,203 ▼
  - Density: 2.319/sq mi (0.8954/km^{2})
- Time zone: UTC−6 (Central)
  - Summer (DST): UTC−5 (CDT)
- Congressional district: 23rd
- Website: www.co.sutton.tx.us

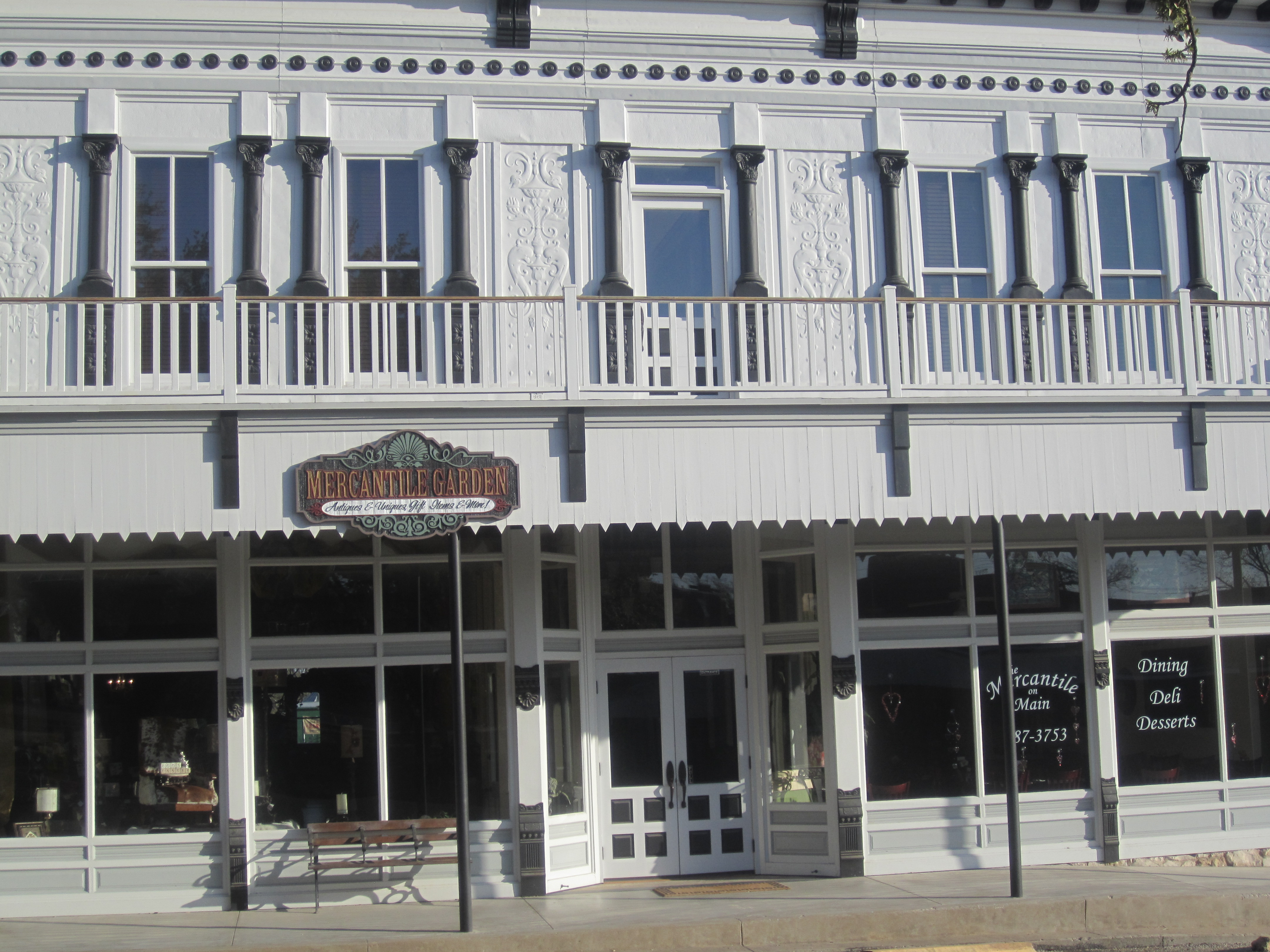
Mercantile Garden, located at the foot of the hill containing the Sutton County Courthouse

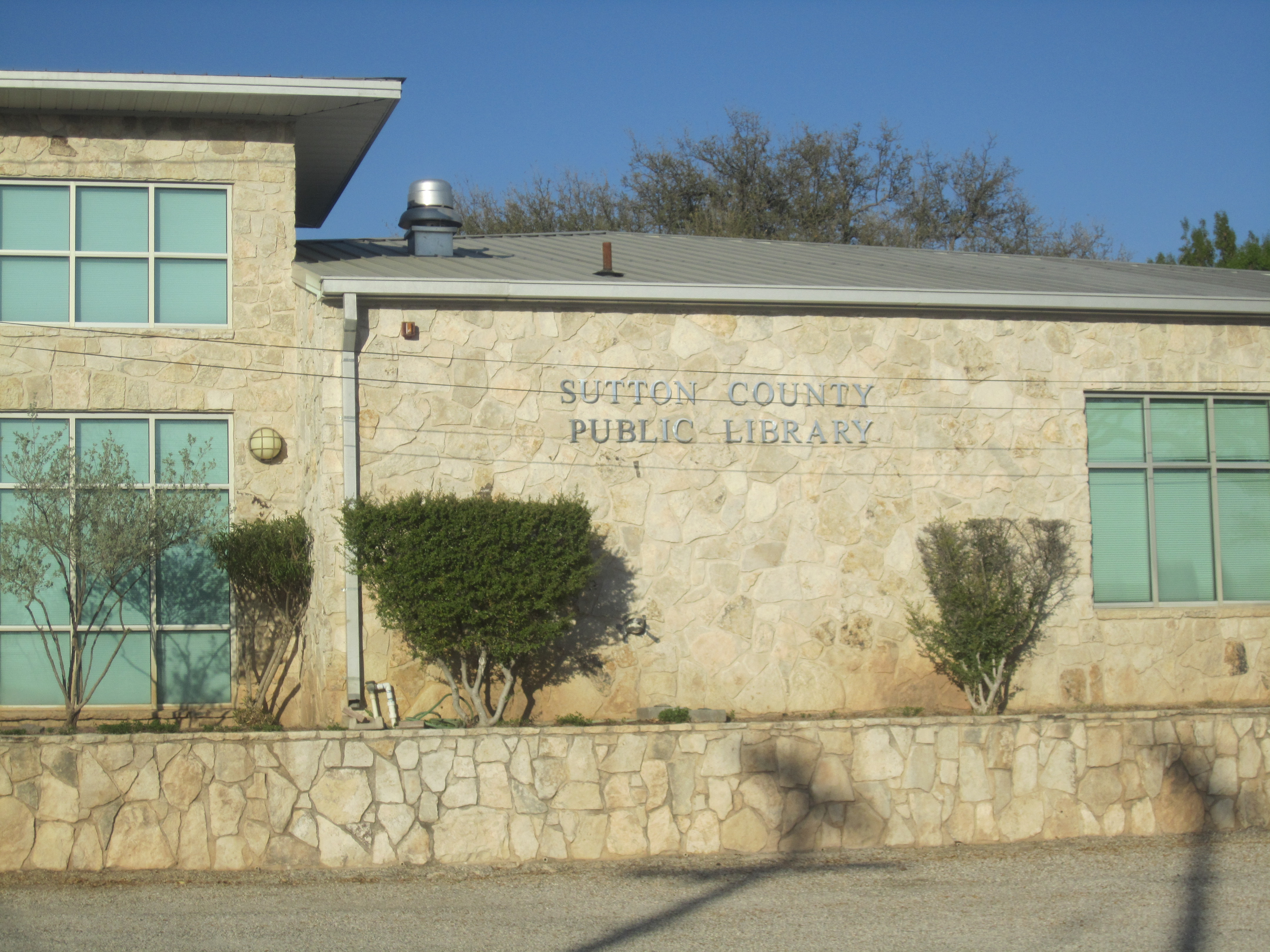
The Sutton County Library in Sonora

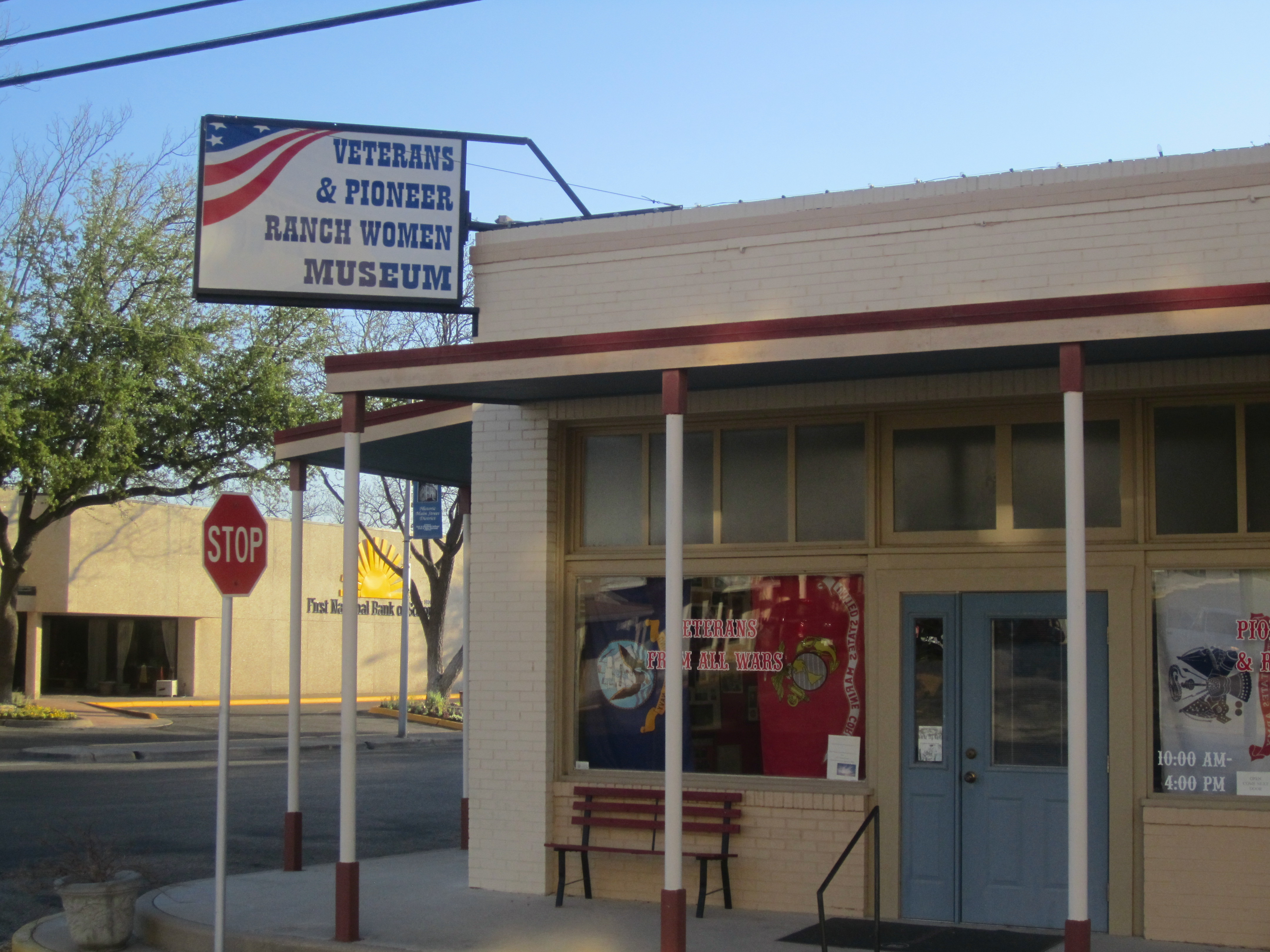
Veterans & Pioneer Ranch Women Museum in Sonora

Sutton County is a county located on the Edwards Plateau in the U.S. state of Texas. As of the 2020 census, the population was 3,372. Its county seat is Sonora. The county was created in 1887 and organized in 1890. Sutton County is named for John S. Sutton, an officer in the Confederate Army.

== History ==
- 9500 BC – c. 1860s AD Paleo-Indians in the county leave behind archaeological remains of a burned-rock midden with mortar and pestle, as well as other tools. Later native inhabitants include Tonkawa, Comanche and Lipan Apache.
- 1736 Lt. Miguel de la Garza Falcón leads 100 soldiers along the Devils River
- 1852, February 2 - Camp Terrett, later known as Fort Terrett, established to protect settlers from Comanches. Founded by Lt. Col. Henry Bainbridge and named for Lt. John Terrett, who was killed in the Battle of Monterrey in 1846.
- 1881 Wall's Well discovered by Tim Birtrong and Ed Wall. Town of Wentworth discovered. Birtrong Ranch is the area's only ranch.
- 1885 Charles G. Adams, a merchant and sometime rancher from Fort McKavett, founds Sonora, Texas, named after a family servant from Sonora, Mexico.
- 1887 The Texas legislature establishes Sutton County, carved out of eastern Crockett County named for Confederate officer John Schuyler Sutton.
- 1890 Sonora becomes the county seat.
- 1915 Texas Sheep & Goat Raisers’ Association organized.
- 1928 The Atchison, Topeka and Santa Fe Railway acquires Kansas City, Mexico and Orient Railway to connect Sonora with San Angelo, Del Rio, and the outside world by rail.
- 1930 Sonora Wool and Mohair Company established.
- 1936 WPA projects help local economy.
- 1958, August 1 – Sonora Municipal Airport activated.
- 1960, July 16 – Caverns of Sonora open to the public.
- 1965 Caverns of Sonora designated National Natural Landmark.
- 1975 Fort Terrett Ranch is purchased by the Texas oil industrialist Bill Noël and used in part for the growing of pecans.

== Geography ==
According to the U.S. Census Bureau, the county has a total area of 1,454 square miles (3,770 km^{2}), of which 1,454 square miles (3,770 km^{2}) is land and 0.5 square miles (1.3 km^{2}) (0.03%) is water.

=== Major highways ===
- Interstate 10
- U.S. Highway 277
- Loop 467

=== Adjacent counties ===
- Schleicher County (north)
- Kimble County (east)
- Edwards County (south)
- Val Verde County (southwest)
- Crockett County (west)
- Menard County (northeast)

== Demographics ==
Historical population
Census	Pop.	Note	%±
1890	658		—
1900	1,727		162.5%
1910	1,569		−9.1%
1920	1,598		1.8%
1930	2,807		75.7%
1940	3,977		41.7%
1950	3,746		−5.8%
1960	3,738		−0.2%
1970	3,175		−15.1%
1980	5,130		61.6%
1990	4,135		−19.4%
2000	4,077		−1.4%
2010	4,128		1.3%
2020	3,372		−18.3%
2025 (est.)	3,203	▼	−5.0%
U.S. Decennial Census; 1850–2010 2010 2020

=== Racial and ethnic composition ===
Sutton County, Texas – Racial and ethnic composition Note: the US Census treats Hispanic/Latino as an ethnic category. This table excludes Latinos from the racial categories and assigns them to a separate category. Hispanics/Latinos may be of any race.
Race / Ethnicity (NH = Non-Hispanic)	Pop 1980	Pop 1990	Pop 2000	Pop 2010	Pop 2020	% 1980	% 1990	% 2000	% 2010	% 2020
White alone (NH)	3,039	2,244	1,934	1,639	1,200	59.24%	54.27%	47.44%	39.70%	35.59%
Black or African American alone (NH)	3	1	7	6	6	0.06%	0.02%	0.17%	0.15%	0.18%
Native American or Alaska Native alone (NH)	16	14	11	2	5	0.31%	0.34%	0.27%	0.05%	0.15%
Asian alone (NH)	1	6	7	5	6	0.02%	0.15%	0.17%	0.12%	0.18%
Native Hawaiian or Pacific Islander alone (NH)	x	x	0	0	0	x	x	0.00%	0.00%	0.00%
Other race alone (NH)	0	4	0	7	14	0.00%	0.10%	0.00%	0.17%	0.42%
Mixed race or Multiracial (NH)	x	x	12	10	48	x	x	0.29%	0.24%	1.42%
Hispanic or Latino (any race)	2,071	1,866	2,106	2,459	2,093	40.37%	45.13%	51.66%	59.57%	62.07%
Total	5,130	4,135	4,077	4,128	3,372	100.00%	100.00%	100.00%	100.00%	100.00%

=== 2020 census ===
As of the 2020 census, the county had a population of 3,372. The median age was 44.6 years. 24.2% of residents were under the age of 18 and 21.0% of residents were 65 years of age or older. For every 100 females there were 99.8 males, and for every 100 females age 18 and over there were 94.7 males age 18 and over.

The racial makeup of the county was 58.1% White, 0.3% Black or African American, 0.5% American Indian and Alaska Native, 0.2% Asian, 0.1% Native Hawaiian and Pacific Islander, 15.4% from some other race, and 25.4% from two or more races. Hispanic or Latino residents of any race comprised 62.1% of the population.

<0.1% of residents lived in urban areas, while 100.0% lived in rural areas.

There were 1,359 households in the county, of which 33.7% had children under the age of 18 living in them. Of all households, 52.2% were married-couple households, 19.9% were households with a male householder and no spouse or partner present, and 24.7% were households with a female householder and no spouse or partner present. About 27.3% of all households were made up of individuals and 13.1% had someone living alone who was 65 years of age or older.

There were 1,878 housing units, of which 27.6% were vacant. Among occupied housing units, 73.4% were owner-occupied and 26.6% were renter-occupied. The homeowner vacancy rate was 3.4% and the rental vacancy rate was 24.6%.

=== 2000 census ===
As of the 2000 census, there were 4,077 people, 1,515 households, and 1,145 families residing in the county. The population density was 3 people per square mile (1.2 people/km^{2}). There were 1,998 housing units at an average density of 1 units per square mile (0.39 units/km^{2}). The racial makeup of the county was 45.28% White, 0.25% Black or African American, 0.42% Native American, 0.17% Asian, 2.27% from other races, and 1.62% from two or more races. 49.99% of the population were Hispanic or Latino of any race.

There were 1,515 households, out of which 38.20% had children under the age of 18 living with them, 63.60% were married couples living together, 7.70% had a female householder with no husband present, and 24.40% were non-families. 22.60% of all households were made up of individuals, and 9.60% had someone living alone who was 65 years of age or older. The average household size was 2.67 and the average family size was 3.15.

In the county, the population was spread out, with 28.80% under the age of 18, 6.70% from 18 to 24, 27.70% from 25 to 44, 24.40% from 45 to 64, and 12.50% who were 65 years of age or older. The median age was 36 years. For every 100 females there were 99.50 males. For every 100 females age 18 and over, there were 96.00 males.

The median income for a household in the county was $34,385, and the median income for a family was $38,143. Males had a median income of $31,193 versus $18,587 for females. The per capita income for the county was $17,105. About 14.10% of families and 18.00% of the population were below the poverty line, including 25.20% of those under age 18 and 16.10% of those age 65 or over.

== Education ==
Sutton County is served by the Sonora Independent School District, based in Sonora.

Sutton County is in the service area of Howard County Junior College District.

== Communities ==
=== City ===
- Sonora (county seat)

=== Ghost towns ===
- Fort Terrett
- Owenville

== Politics ==
Sutton County is very conservative in national politics. In 2016, it gave 76% of its vote to Republican candidate Donald Trump. It last supported a Democrat in 1964, when Texan Lyndon B. Johnson was the Democratic candidate. However, this was not always the case. In fact, in 1916, the Democratic candidate received 10 times as many votes as the Republican. It hasn't supported a Democrat in Texas gubernatorial elections since 1974, when Dolph Briscoe, the Democrat, carried all but five counties in the state.

United States presidential election results for Sutton County, Texas
Year	Republican		Democratic		Third party(ies)	
Year	No.	%	No.	%	No.	%
1912	12	13.04%	62	67.39%	18	19.57%
1916	13	9.09%	130	90.91%	0	0.00%
1920	104	34.10%	190	62.30%	11	3.61%
1924	124	46.10%	143	53.16%	2	0.74%
1928	290	75.92%	92	24.08%	0	0.00%
1932	113	23.30%	372	76.70%	0	0.00%
1936	64	13.85%	398	86.15%	0	0.00%
1940	84	12.79%	571	86.91%	2	0.30%
1944	118	18.55%	449	70.60%	69	10.85%
1948	131	21.06%	433	69.61%	58	9.32%
1952	581	62.34%	351	37.66%	0	0.00%
1956	546	65.16%	290	34.61%	2	0.24%
1960	437	47.97%	474	52.03%	0	0.00%
1964	357	33.97%	694	66.03%	0	0.00%
1968	412	45.27%	351	38.57%	147	16.15%
1972	705	73.67%	245	25.60%	7	0.73%
1976	831	51.65%	768	47.73%	10	0.62%
1980	1,000	66.18%	485	32.10%	26	1.72%
1984	1,251	72.69%	465	27.02%	5	0.29%
1988	996	63.44%	571	36.37%	3	0.19%
1992	687	42.99%	524	32.79%	387	24.22%
1996	688	52.84%	508	39.02%	106	8.14%
2000	1,063	69.03%	468	30.39%	9	0.58%
2004	1,173	80.73%	280	19.27%	0	0.00%
2008	1,189	75.35%	381	24.14%	8	0.51%
2012	1,110	74.45%	369	24.75%	12	0.80%
2016	1,075	75.92%	313	22.10%	28	1.98%
2020	1,222	78.38%	322	20.65%	15	0.96%
2024	1,167	83.36%	228	16.29%	5	0.36%

United States Senate election results for Sutton County, Texas1
Year	Republican		Democratic		Third party(ies)	
Year	No.	%	No.	%	No.	%
2024	1,129	81.28%	239	17.21%	21	1.51%

United States Senate election results for Sutton County, Texas2
Year	Republican		Democratic		Third party(ies)	
Year	No.	%	No.	%	No.	%
2020	1,204	78.74%	305	19.95%	20	1.31%

Texas Gubernatorial election results for Sutton County
Year	Republican		Democratic		Third party(ies)	
Year	No.	%	No.	%	No.	%
2022	970	83.48%	178	15.32%	14	1.20%

== See also ==
- List of museums in Central Texas
- National Register of Historic Places listings in Sutton County, Texas
- Recorded Texas Historic Landmarks in Sutton County
