= Buillisford, Texas =

Buillisford is a ghost town in Crockett County, Texas, United States. It maintained a post office from February through September 1882.
