= Edruvera, Texas =

Ghost town in Crockett County, Texas, United States

Coordinates: 31.0851°N 102.3645°W

Edruvera is a ghost town in Crockett County, Texas, United States.
