= Crockett County Courthouse =

- U.S. National Register of Historic Places
- Texas State Antiquities Landmark
- Recorded Texas Historic Landmark
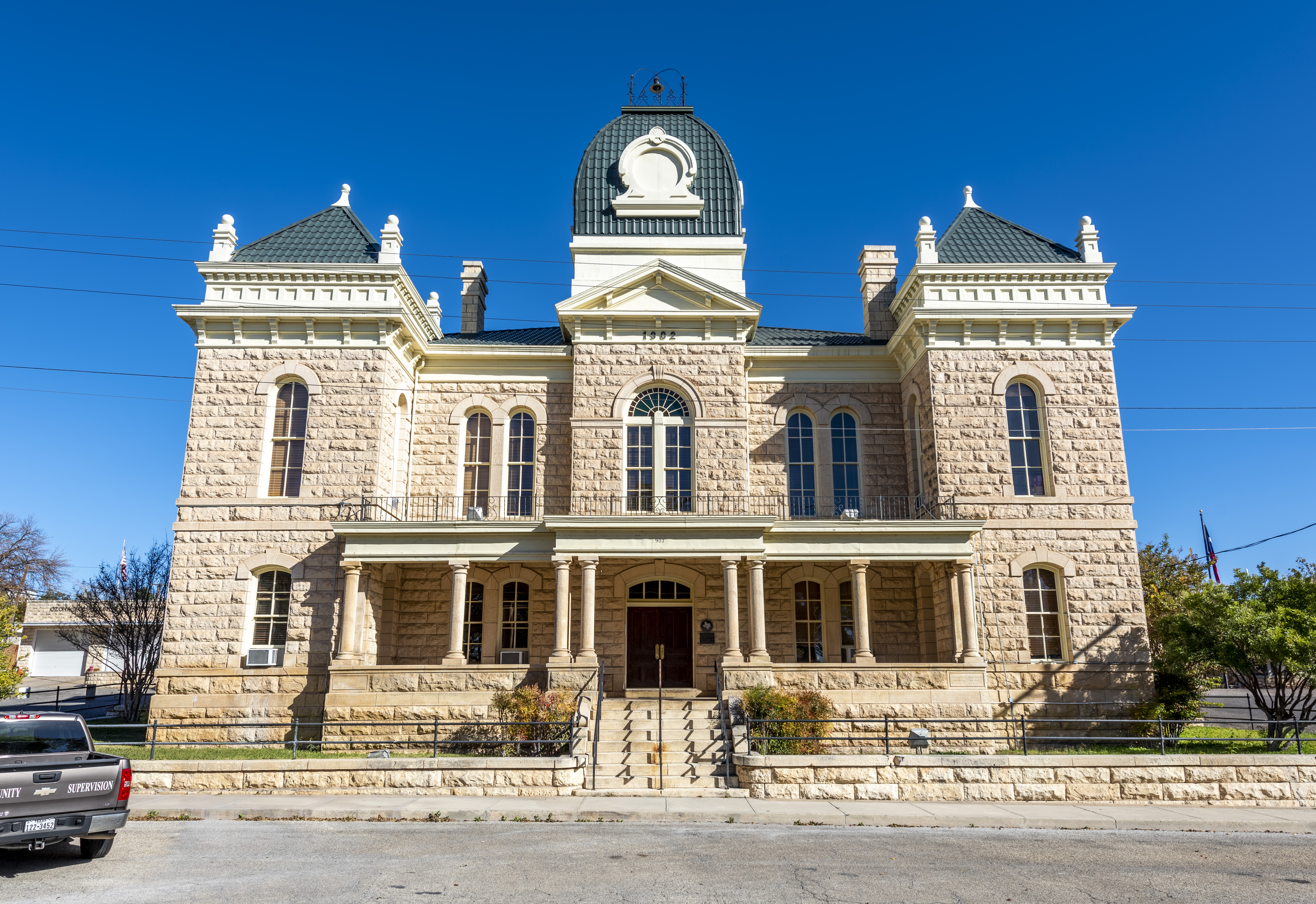
- The Crockett County Courthouse in 2020.

- Location within Texas Location within the United States
- Interactive map showing the location of Crockett County Courthouse
- Location: 907 Ave D, Ozona, Texas, United States
- Coordinates: 30°42′38″N 101°12′0″W
- Area: 1 acre (0.40 ha)
- Built: 1902
- Architect: Oscar Ruffini
- Architectural style: Second Empire, Richardsonian Romanesque
- NRHP reference No.: 74002066
- TSAL No.: 8200000188
- RTHL No.: 1111

Significant dates
- Added to NRHP: December 27, 1974
- Designated TSAL: May 28, 1981
- Designated RTHL: 1966

The Crockett County Courthouse is a historic courthouse built in 1902 at 907 Ave D, Ozona, Texas, United States. The Second Empire style building was designed by Oscar Ruffini of San Angelo. It was added to the National Register of Historic Places on December 27, 1974.

Crockett County was organized in 1891 and named after Davy Crockett. The first courthouse was a wood-frame structure built in 1891. The building served the county until 1902 when the present hand cut native limestone courthouse and jail were built. The estimated cost of the courthouse was $30,000 paid for by bonds issued by the county. In its first few decades of existence, the two-story structure also served as a community center for social events and weekly dances.

== See also ==
- National Register of Historic Places listings in Crockett County, Texas
- List of county courthouses in Texas
