= Beaver Lake (Texas) =

Defunct lake in Texas, United States

- Location within Texas
- Location: Present-day Val Verde County, Texas, U.S.
- Coordinates: 30.17916°N 101.0708°W
- Type: Lake

Beaver Lake was a small lake or beaver pond formerly found on the Devils River in what is now Val Verde County, Texas. It was located about 19 miles (31 km) north of second crossing of Devil's River and 44 miles (71 km) from Howard Springs.

== History ==
Beaver Lake was first encountered upstream of the head of Devil's River by the 1849 U. S. Army military expedition that established the San Antonio-El Paso Road. It was described by Robert A. Eccleston, one of a party of forty-niners traveling with the expedition. In Eccleston's diary of that trip he writes about the lake they camped near from July 23–26, 1849, as:

a pretty little lake. There was however no path down to the water & the bank was very steep. My brother and I went fishing in the lake... He caught two catfish... There is a beaver dam on the lake close to our camp. No beavers have yet been seen.

It was 213 miles (343 km) from San Antonio on the road, according to the topographical engineers with the expedition.

The Beaver Lake Ranch is located nearby to the north.
