= Emerald, Texas =

Ghost town in Texas, United States

Coordinates: 30.7208°N 101.1549°W

Emerald (also called Emerald Grove and Laverne) is a ghost town in Crockett County, Texas, United States. The community's elevation was 2,425 and consisted of a mile-square site of 300 lots, including a two-room schoolhouse and a store. The Fort Worth and Rio Grande Railway Company equipped the town's well with a windmill, pump, and tank. Houses and other buildings were constructed after 1888, when the well was dug, and a post office was established in 1890. Later that year, Ozona was named the county seat and Emerald was completely abandoned by 1897, when the school building was disassembled and moved to Ozona. Nothing remains of the town site, but it is noted as being 7 miles east of Ozona and 85 miles southeast of San Angelo.
