= National Register of Historic Places listings in Crockett County, Texas =

Location of Crockett County in Texas

This is a list of the National Register of Historic Places listings in Crockett County, Texas.

This is intended to be a complete list of properties and districts listed on the National Register of Historic Places in Crockett County, Texas. There are one district and six individual properties listed on the National Register in the county. These properties include two State Antiquities Landmarks one of which is a State Historic Site while the other is a Recorded Texas Historic Landmark.

This National Park Service list is complete through NPS recent listings posted March 21, 2025.

== Current listings ==
The publicly disclosed locations of National Register properties and districts may be seen in a mapping service provided.

	Name on the Register	Image	Date listed	Location	City or town	Description
1	Camp Melvin Site	Camp Melvin Site	November 15, 1978 (#78002909)	Address restricted	Iraan	
2	Ira and Wilma Carson House	Ira and Wilma Carson House	September 26, 2002 (#02001062)	1103 Avenue C 30°42′35″N 101°11′58″W	Ozona	
3	Crockett County Courthouse	Crockett County Courthouse	December 27, 1974 (#74002066)	907 Ave. D 30°42′39″N 101°12′02″W	Ozona	State Antiquities Landmark, Recorded Texas Historic Landmark
4	Fort Lancaster	Fort Lancaster	March 11, 1971 (#71000928)	10 mi. E of Sheffield on U.S. 290; 30°39′58″N 101°41′46″W	Sheffield	State Historic Site, State Antiquities Landmark
5	Harris Ranch Petroglyph Site 41 CX 110	Harris Ranch Petroglyph Site 41 CX 110	May 5, 1978 (#78002908)	Address restricted	Iraan	
6	Live Oak Creek Archeological District	Live Oak Creek Archeological District	April 2, 1976 (#76002018)	Address restricted	Sheffield	
7	Turkey Roost Petroglyph Site	Turkey Roost Petroglyph Site	October 19, 1978 (#78002910)	Address restricted	Ozona	

== See also ==
- National Register of Historic Places listings in Texas
- Recorded Texas Historic Landmarks in Crockett County
