= Owenville, Texas =

Ghost town in Texas, U.S.

Coordinates: 30.6289°N 100.2227°W

Owenville is a ghost town in Sutton County, Texas, United States. It was located on the headwaters of Epps Creek in May, 1899.
