= National Register of Historic Places listings in Sutton County, Texas =

Location of Sutton County in Texas

This is a list of the National Register of Historic Places listings in Sutton County, Texas.

This is intended to be a complete list of properties and districts listed on the National Register of Historic Places in Sutton County, Texas. There are three properties listed on the National Register in the county. Two of these are Recorded Texas Historic Landmarks including one that is also a State Antiquities Landmark.

This National Park Service list is complete through NPS recent listings posted May 1, 2026.

== Current listings ==
The locations of National Register properties may be seen in a mapping service provided.

	Name on the Register	Image	Date listed	Location	City or town	Description
1	deBerry Ranch		February 21, 2011 (#11000134)	Private Rd. 1105, approximately 1.5 miles east of County Road 108; 30°37′33″N 100°41′31″W	Sonora vicinity	
2	Old Mercantile Building	Old Mercantile Building	January 30, 1978 (#78002979)	222 Main St. 30°34′18″N 100°38′40″W	Sonora	Recorded Texas Historic Landmark
3	Sutton County Courthouse	Sutton County Courthouse	July 15, 1977 (#77001476)	Public Sq. 30°34′20″N 100°38′37″W	Sonora	State Antiquities Landmark, Recorded Texas Historic Landmark

== See also ==
- National Register of Historic Places listings in Texas
- Recorded Texas Historic Landmarks in Sutton County
