= Government Canyon =

Government Canyon, a valley that heads at an elevation of 2483 feet at 30°35′30″N 101°16′25″W, and runs southwest to its mouth on Howard Draw in Crockett County, elevation 2014 feet.

Government Canyon was a place along the route where the San Antonio-El Paso Road left the Head of Devil's River to go northwest, 44 miles across Johnson Draw and Government Canyon to Howard Draw and Howard Spring.
