= Fort Terrett, Texas =

Site of Fort Terrett
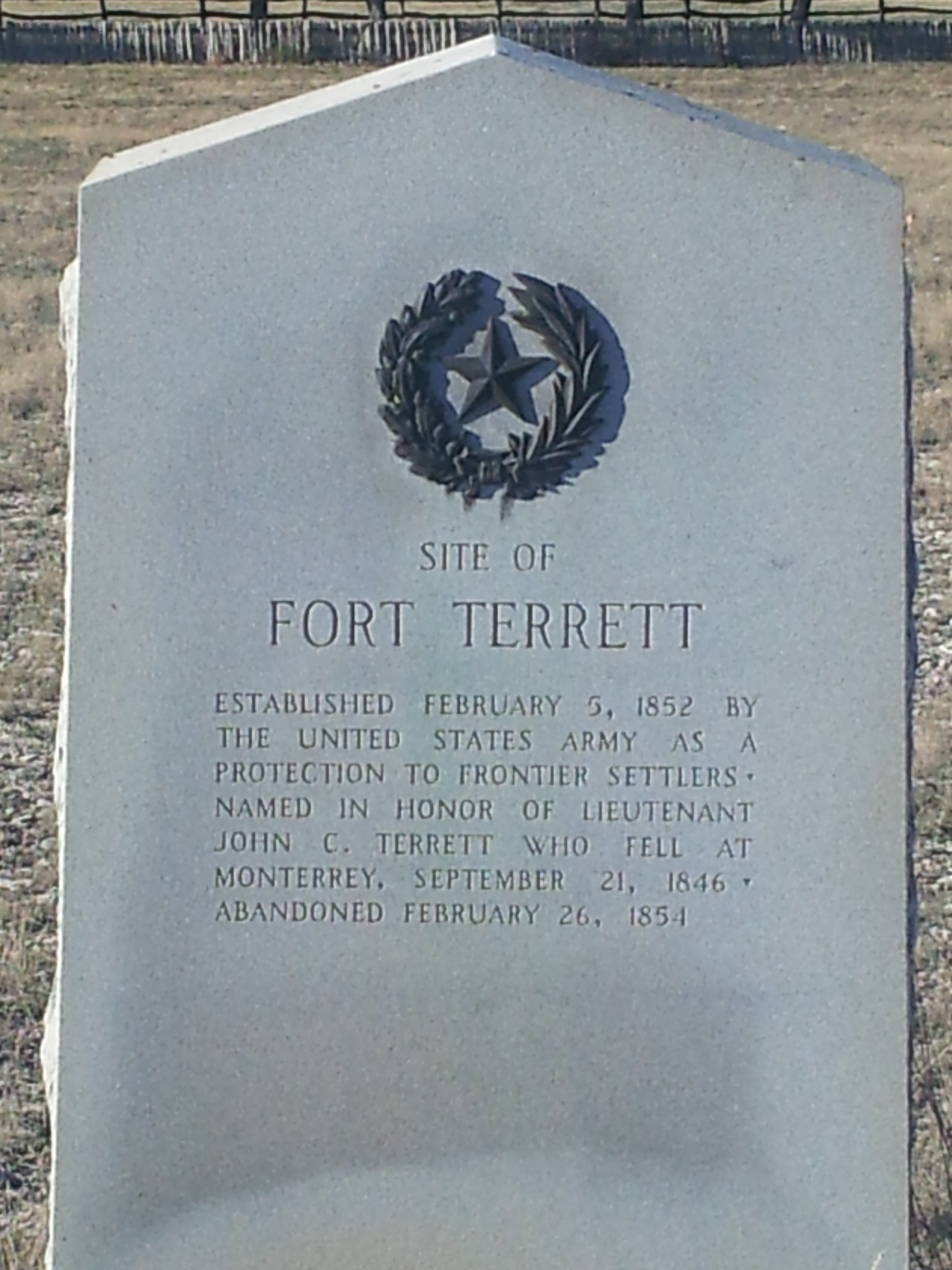
- Fort Terrett Historical Marker

- Location within Texas Location within the United States
- 30°27′47″N 100°11′09″W
- Location: CR 307 off IH-10 via Exit 429 near Sonora, Texas

History
- Built: 1852

Site notes
- Governing body: Private

Recorded Texas Historic Landmark
- Designated: 1962
- Reference no.: 4799

Fort Terrett Headquarters
- Interactive map of Fort Terrett Headquarters

Recorded Texas Historic Landmark
- Designated: 1962
- Reference no.: 2024

Fort Terrett was a U.S. Army post from 1852 to 1854, later the site of a ranch, an historic locale in Sutton County, Texas, United States.

Originally named "Post on the Rio Llano", "Post on the North Fork River Llano", or "Camp Lugubre", it was renamed in 1852 after Lt John Terrett. Terrett was killed in the Battle of Monterrey in 1846. Lt. Col. Henry Bainbridge established the camp in February 1852 for protection for the settlements and travelers along the Upper El Pao-San Antonio Road. It was located along the North Llano River in Sutton County. The post was abandoned in February 1854 the troops locating farther to the west and north on the advancing frontier. The fort buildings were then used for the Terrett Ranch.

Even though the forts were officially abandoned, Major Jones commanded a search group composed of part of Captain Coldwell's company and 30 individuals from the Fort Terrett area in 1875. He had searched the area thoroughly as it had been reported that the old Fort or vicinity was being used as the primary camp by an organized band of horse thieves and robbers. Major John B. Jones' company was searching for the thieves that drove stolen stock towards the head of the Llano in order to change the brand. The newly rebranded cattle were then separated into groups and then taken to different cities to sell. Major Jones felt that this group included the Llano Springs robbers. His company had captured one of thieves who had been wounded near Kerrville and provided some of the incriminating information about this band of 60 or 70 criminals. After searching for a week, Major Jones wrote from Menard County that the searchers did find some suspicious individuals who were possibly confederates of the thieves and robbers. He gave these individuals a warning that they would be occasionally visited by the Texas Rangers to ascertain if they had received any stolen property or were harboring any criminals.

The state of Texas constructed a site marker, now located off CR 307 near I-10, Exit 429.
