= Stephen Decatur Carpenter =

American military officer (1818–1862)

- Born: May 21, 1818; Foxcroft, Maine, U.S.
- Died: December 31, 1862 (aged 44); Battle of Stones River, Rutherford County, Tennessee
- Cause of death: Killed in action
- Education: United States Military Academy
- Occupation: U.S. Army Officer
- Parent(s): Joshua Carpenter, Susan Heald

Stephen Decatur Carpenter (May 21, 1818 – December 31, 1862) was a United States military officer from Maine. He served from 1840 to his death on the last day of 1862, through four major conflicts and one minor conflict.

== West Point ==
He was appointed to the United States Military Academy at West Point, serving as a Cadet from July 1, 1836, through graduation on July 1, 1840.

== Service in the West ==
After graduation he served in the Second Seminole War from 1840–1841, at Fort Snelling, at the confluence of the Mississippi and Minnesota rivers, in the War with Mexico from 1846–1847, and on frontier duty in south and west Texas from 1848–1861, including being wounded in a skirmish with the Comanches. On August 20, 1855, he established Fort Lancaster in western Texas to guard the San Antonio-El Paso road. He was the first commander of Fort Stockton, established at Comanche Springs (in present-day Pecos County, Texas) and served there until December 1860, when he transferred command to the Eighth Infantry.

== Civil War ==
When the American Civil War broke out, he served garrison and staff duty at Key West, Florida, and Indianapolis, Indiana, and combat duty in the Tennessee and Mississippi Campaign with the Army of the Ohio. He was killed in action in the Battle of Stone's River (called the Battle of Murfreesboro in the South) Tennessee on December 31, 1862.
