= Ozona High School =

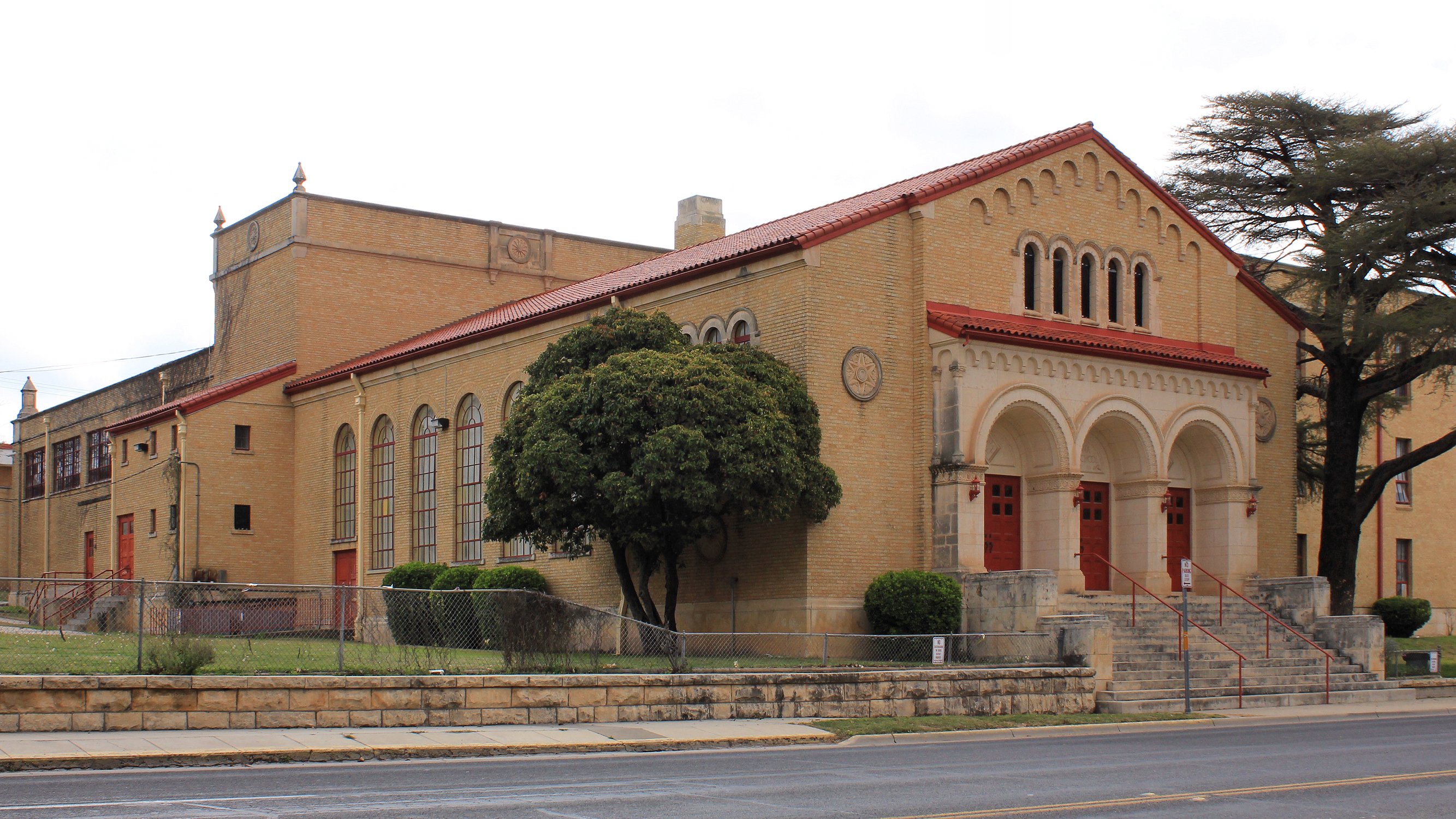

Location
- 605 Avenue E Ozona, Texas 76943; United States
- Coordinates: 30°42′49″N 101°12′4″W

Information
- Type: Public high school
- School district: Crockett County Consolidated Common School District
- Principal: Ronny Clayton
- Teaching staff: 26.27 (on an FTE basis)
- Grades: 9–12
- Enrollment: 214 (2024–2025)
- Student to teacher ratio: 8.15
- Colors: Purple & Gold
- Athletics conference: UIL Class AA
- Mascot: Lion
- Yearbook: Lion
- Website: www.ozonaschools.net/o/ohs

Recorded Texas Historic Landmark
- Designated: 1968
- Reference no.: 3895

Ozona High School is a public high school located in Ozona, Texas, and classified as a 2A school by the UIL. It is part of the Crockett County Consolidated Common School District which covers all of Crockett County. Although the district is county-wide, the high school goes by Ozona. Ozona High School is known for the Lion Band. Although there is a lack of an FFA, CDE and LDE program, there is a stock show and 4-H program that is strong in the community. In 2015, the school was rated "Met Standard" by the Texas Education Agency.

== Athletics ==
The Ozona Lions compete in these sports -

- Baseball
- Basketball
- Cross Country
- Football
- Golf
- Powerlifting
- Softball
- Tennis
- Track and Field

=== State Titles ===
- Girls Basketball -
  - 1995(2A), 1996(2A)
- Boys Cross Country -
  - 2004(2A), 2013(1A)
- Girls Golf -
  - 1997(2A)
