= Oscar Ruffini =

American architect important in the history of West Texas

- Born: 10 April 1858; Cleveland, Ohio
- Died: January 18, 1957 (aged 98); San Angelo, Texas
- Relatives: Frederick Ernst Ruffini

Oscar Ruffini (10 April 1858–18 January 1957) was an architect in San Angelo, Texas. He was the first civic architect in the city and was responsible for many buildings across West Texas in the last 20 years of the 19th century.

== Early life ==
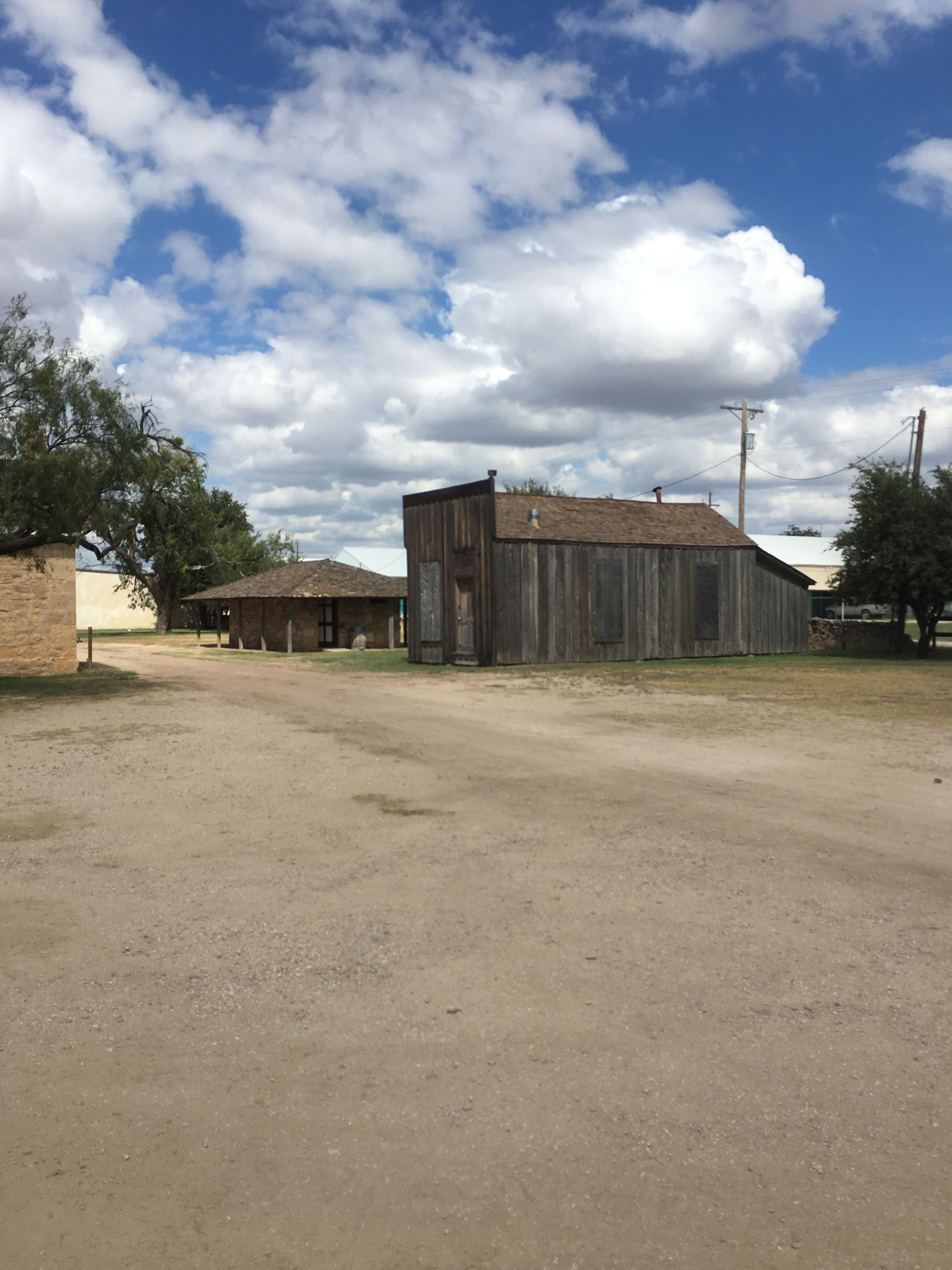
Oscar Ruffini's shack, moved to Fort Concho in the mid-20th century.

Oscar Ruffini was born on 10 April 1858 to Germans Ernest Ruffini and Adelaide Reihme, who migrated to the United States of America shortly after their marriage in 1848. Oscar and his siblings, Frederick, Alvin, Clara, and Camilla, were raised in Cleveland, Ohio. Documentation on Oscar's life before his arrival in San Angelo, Texas is spotty, but at 14 he and Frederick were apprenticed to a Cleveland-based architect. Oscar went independent four years later, while Frederick remained under the architect's tutelage.

== Architectural career ==
From 1875 to 1877, Oscar worked for an architect in Cincinnati named George W. Rapp. From 1878 to 1880, he may have been residing and studying in Paris, though it is not known where exactly he studied.

Ruffini was back in the United States by 1880, as he was at that time working in Evansville, Indiana. He then worked in St. Louis, Missouri from 1882 to 1883 in an unknown capacity. In early 1883, Frederick called Oscar to work for his practice in Austin. Oscar came to San Angelo in 1884, and settled permanently there shortly thereafter.

== Architectural style and legacy ==
Ruffini's style leaned in a Neoclassical direction. Surviving sketchbooks in the possession of the Fort Concho Museum contain studies and sketches of Classical statuary and architectural details. Rather than Impressionism or avant-garde, in vogue in Paris during the 1870s, when Ruffini was alleged to have been studying there, Ruffini was influenced strongly by the Second Empire style of Napoleon III.

A number of Ruffini's works featured metal construction, which he most likely learned while working in St. Louis. Metal construction became more and more popular in the United States in the 1850s and mid-1880s. It was used in great effect in the central warehouses in St. Louis during the 1870s.

A number of Ruffini's works are listed on the U.S. National Register of Historic Places.

- Concho County Courthouse, Public Sq., Paint Rock, TX
- Crockett County Courthouse, 907 Ave. D, Ozona, TX
- Harris Drug Store, 114 S. Chadbourne St., San Angelo, TX
- Mason-Hughes House, 1104 W. Beauregard, San Angelo, TX
- Montgomery Ward Building, 10 W. Beauregard, San Angelo, TX
- J. J. Rackley Building, 118 S. Chadbourne, San Angelo, TX
- San Angelo National Bank, Johnson and Taylor, and Schwartz and Raas Buildings, 20–22, 24, 26 E. Concho Ave., San Angelo, TX
- Sutton County Courthouse, Public Sq., Sonora, TX
- Tom Green County Jail, US 67, San Angelo, TX
