= Sutton County Courthouse =

- U.S. National Register of Historic Places
- Texas State Antiquities Landmark
- Recorded Texas Historic Landmark
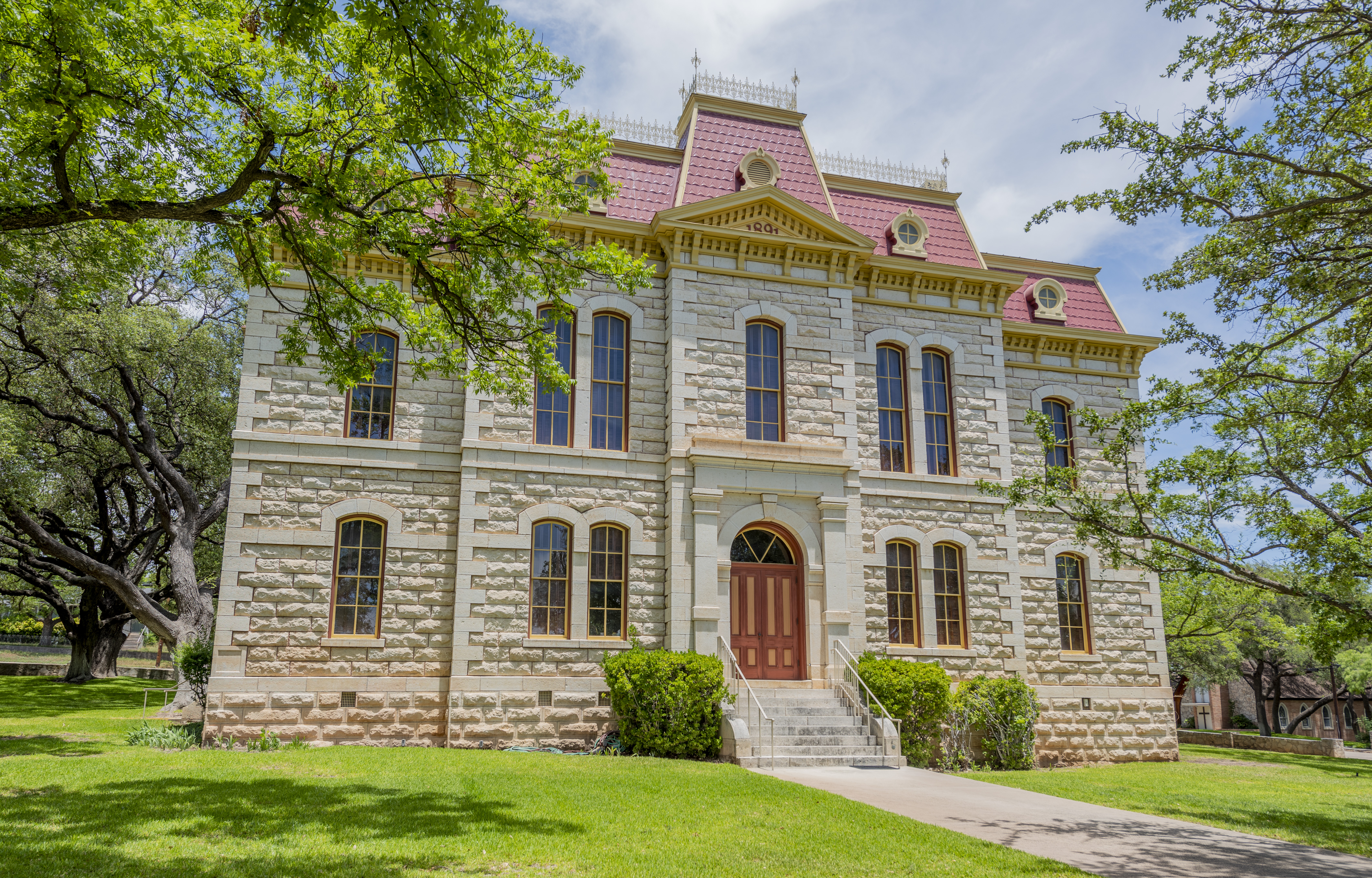
- Sutton County Courthouse in 2020

- Location within Texas Location within the United States
- Location: 300 E. Oak St., Sonora, Texas
- Coordinates: 30°34′20″N 100°38′37″W
- Area: 2 acres (0.81 ha)
- Built: 1891-1893
- Built by: J.D. Gafford
- Architect: Oscar Ruffini
- Architectural style: Second Empire
- NRHP reference No.: 77001476
- TSAL No.: 8200000574
- RTHL No.: 5157

Significant dates
- Added to NRHP: July 15, 1977
- Designated TSAL: January 1, 1981
- Designated RTHL: 1962

The Sutton County Courthouse, on Public Square in Sonora, Texas, US, was built in 1891. It was listed on the National Register of Historic Places in 1977.

It was designed in Second Empire style by architect Oscar Ruffini.

It is a Texas State Antiquities Landmark and a Recorded Texas Historic Landmark.

== See also ==
- National Register of Historic Places listings in Sutton County, Texas
- Recorded Texas Historic Landmarks in Sutton County
- List of county courthouses in Texas
