= Live Oak Creek (Crockett County, Texas) =

Stream in Reagan and Crockett Counties

Coordinates: 30°39′08″N 101°42′31″W

- Map Map of Live Oak Creek

Location
- Country: United States
- State: Texas

Live Oak Creek is a stream with its source in Reagan County, Texas, at an elevation of 2,938 feet (896 m), and runs southward to its mouth at an elevation of 2,001 feet (610 m) on the Pecos River in Crockett County, Texas. Fort Lancaster was located east of the creek's mouth.

Live Oak Creek was a water source on the San Antonio–El Paso Road, 30.44 miles (48.99 km) from Howard Springs, 3 miles (4.8 km) from Fort Lancaster, and 7.29 miles (11.73 km) from Pecos Crossing.

On July 9, 1857, Edward Fitzgerald Beale described it:

Live Oak creek is a clear and beautiful stream of sweet and cool water; the grass very fine, and wood, (oak, mesquite, and willow,) abundant. Just before descending into the valley of the stream we came to a very steep, rocky hill, overlooking a valley of great beauty and graceful shape. The sides of the hills were covered with the most brilliant verdure and flowers.
