= Johnson Draw =

Location
- Country: United States

Physical characteristics
- Source
  - location: Texas
- Mouth
  - elevation: 1,673 ft (510 m)

Johnson Draw, also formerly known as Johnsons Run and Johnson Creek, is a tributary of the Devils River in Val Verde County, Texas. It has its source in Crockett County, Texas at 30°56′03″N 101°17′31″W, 17.0 miles north northwest of Ozona, Texas.

== See also ==
- List of rivers of Texas
