= Fort Lancaster =

- U.S. National Register of Historic Places
- Texas State Historic Site
- Texas State Antiquities Landmark
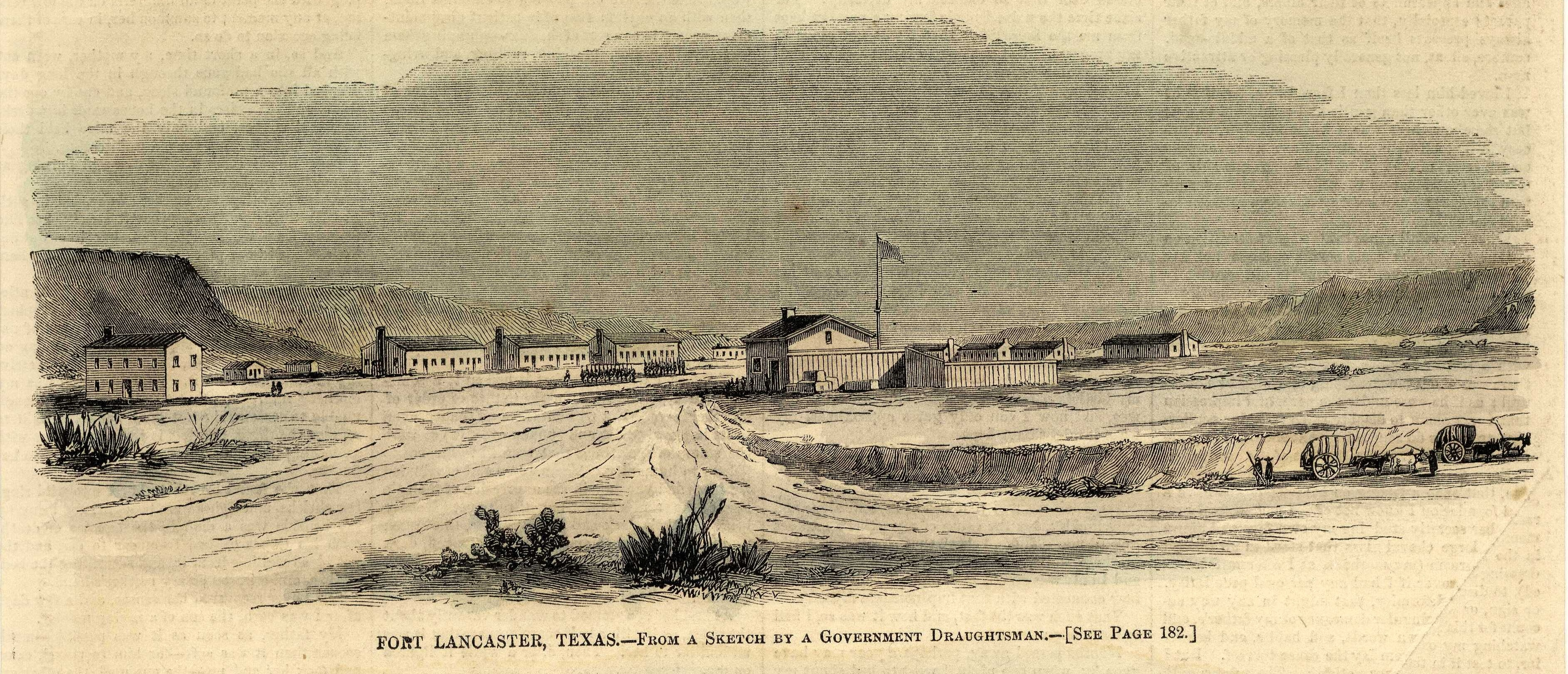
- Illustration of Fort Lancaster in Harper's Weekly, 1861

- Location within Texas Location within the United States
- Location: Crockett County, Texas
- Nearest city: Sheffield, Texas
- Coordinates: 30°39′58″N 101°41′46″W
- Area: 39 acres (16 ha)
- Built: 1855
- NRHP reference No.: 71000928
- TSAL No.: 8200000190

Significant dates
- Added to NRHP: March 11, 1971
- Designated TSHS: April 16, 1968
- Designated TSAL: February 22, 1983

Fort Lancaster is a former United States Army installation located near Sheffield, Texas. The fort was established in 1855 on the San Antonio–El Paso Road to protect migrants moving toward California through Texas. The U.S. Army occupied Fort Lancaster until Texas seceded from the United States in March 1861 and were replaced at the fort by forces loyal to the Confederate States of America. The Confederate Army held the fort from November 1861 until April 1862, when it was again abandoned and then burned.

The 82-acre site, now operated by the Texas Historical Commission as Fort Lancaster State Historic Site, contains the ruins of 29 buildings that made up the fort and a visitor center with a museum.

== Use as military outpost ==
Fort Lancaster was established during the American colonization of Texas in the 19th century, a process that began in the 1820s with the immigration of Anglo-Americans into Spanish, later Mexican, Texas. In 1836, an Anglo-American-dominated Texas seceded from Mexico and became a republic that was annexed into the United States a decade later. That annexation provoked a war between Mexico and the United States in 1848 that the latter won, enabling the U.S. to annex what is now the Southwestern United States.

The 1849 discovery of gold in California, one of the annexed territories, was the catalyst for an unprecedented migration of white settlers across Texas. They moved along such routes as the San Antonio–El Paso Road (also called the Military Road), through territory traversed by the Comanche, Kiowa, and Lipan Apache peoples, who vigorously resisted colonization. To protect the settlers, the U.S. Army established two lines of forts across Texas from 1848 to 1852. Along the Military Road were, from east to west, Forts Inge, Clark, Davis, and Bliss. Between Forts Clark and Davis, however, were 300 miles (480 km) of wilderness. To close that gap, General Persifor Frazer Smith, commander of the Department of Texas, ordered on July 20, 1855, that an outpost be established where the Military Road crossed the Pecos River.

=== Occupation by the U.S. Army, 1855–1861 ===
To carry out Smith's orders, two companies of the 1st Infantry Regiment under the command of Captain Stephen Decatur Carpenter departed Fort Duncan on August 7, 1855. On August 20, 1855, Carpenter arrived at Live Oak Creek, 4 miles (6.4 km) from the Military Road's crossing over the Pecos, and established Camp Lancaster. On August 21, 1856, the outpost was made a permanent U.S. Army installation with the name Fort Lancaster. Its garrison was charged with patrolling the Military Road and policing the frontier. As infantrymen, sometimes mounted on mules, the garrison was ineffective at stopping raiding by mounted indigenous war parties.

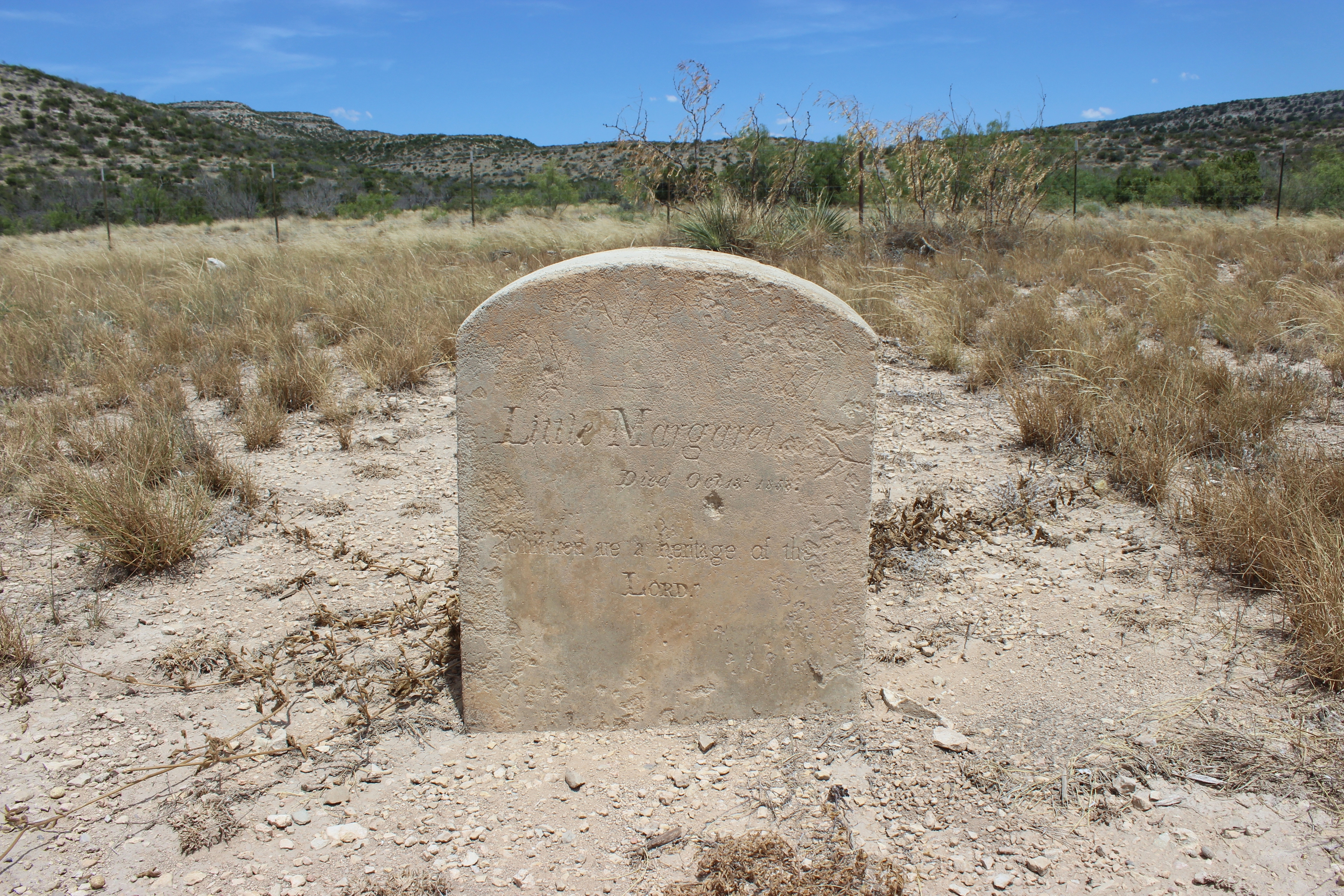
Grave of "Little Margaret", died Oct. 13, 1858, reads, "Children are a heritage of the LORD".

The first structures at Fort Lancaster were jacales, huts with wood or earth walls with canvas roofs, and prefabricated buildings brought by wagon and assembled on-site. In June 1856, Colonel Joseph K. Mansfield inspected Camp Lancaster and described it as being composed mostly of jacales. According to a letter by the post's quartermaster from May 1857, which described the fort as having a "half-finished appearance", it had five permanent officers' residences and two kitchens and attached mess halls, built of stone and adobe bricks, with four permanent enlisted men's barracks under construction. Construction of these and other buildings, which was complicated by a lack of readily available nearby lumber, lasted until 1860.

On July 9, 1857, a caravan of 40 men, 25 camels, and over100 sheep led by Edward Fitzgerald Beale, a former U.S. Navy lieutenant, arrived at Fort Lancaster. The caravan, part of a U.S. Army unit formed in 1855 to test the feasibility of using camels as pack animals on the American frontier, had encamped at a creek 2 miles (3.2 km) from Fort Lancaster. At the invitation of the fort's officers, Beale's caravan stayed the night at Fort Lancaster, then departed the next day. A second caravan of camels arrived at the fort in June 1860.

=== Use by Confederate Texas, 1861–1865 ===
On March 2, 1861, Texas seceded from the United States to join the Confederate States of America. On 4 February, as it moved the state towards secession, the Texas Secession Convention demanded the surrender of all federal garrisons and property in the state. Brevet Major General David E. Twiggs, commander of the Department of Texas since 1857, capitulated. He issued orders on February 24 and 27, 1861, for the garrisons of the forts along the Military Road to abandon their billets and march to the Gulf Coast for evacuation from Texas. Fort Lancaster's garrison departed on March 19, 1861, and were replaced by a company of Confederate troops. On November 28, 1861, Confederate General Henry Hopkins Sibley arrived at Fort Lancaster, as he was following the Military Road towards the New Mexico Territory, which he hoped to invade and capture for the Confederacy. The campaign was a failure. After being defeated at the Battle of Glorieta Pass in March 1862, Sibley's force retreated. Pursued by Federal forces, the Confederates abandoned the forts of the Military Road; Fort Lancaster's garrison departed on April 2, 1862. The fort itself was at around this time destroyed by fire, either by the retreating Confederates or by indigenous peoples.

=== Use by the U.S. Army, 1867–1873 ===
When the Civil War ended, the U.S. Army occupied Texas, which was under U.S. Army administration until 1875. During the occupation, several other frontier forts were established in Texas. Various companies of the 9th Cavalry rotated through Fort Lancaster and gradually the outpost was rebuilt. These soldiers escorted stagecoaches westward and fought skirmishes with Apaches. In December 1867, the U.S. 9th Cavalry's Company K, a unit of African-American cavalrymen with White commissioned officers, was stationed at the fort. These were seasoned "horse soldiers", including Civil War veteran noncommissioned officers. Largely because White cavalry units objected to designating them as "U.S. Cavalry", they were furnished with "saddle mules" and horses inferior to those of other U.S. cavalry units; sometimes they were issued outdated arms and other such second-rate equipment. Despite their equally dangerous and arduous duties, they were officially called "mounted infantry". A motto ascribed to them was "forty miles a day on beans and hay". On December 26, 1867, a large band of Kickapoo and Comanchero raiders attacked the fort to steal horses. The company repelled the attack, but lost 38 horses and mules. Some of the raiders returned two days later; they were unsuccessful in taking the remaining animals.

== Archeology ==
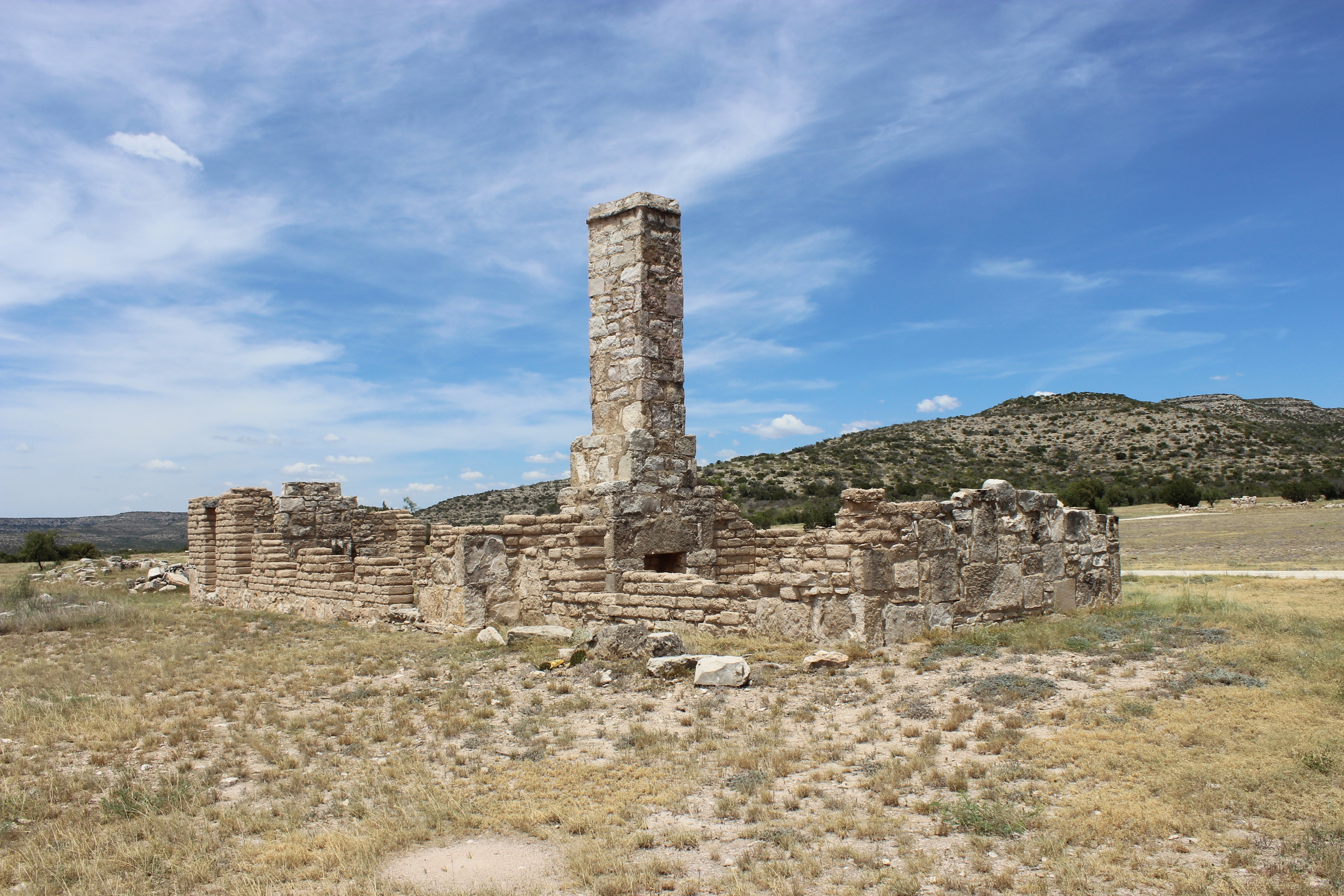
Ruins of Company K Enlisted Men's Barracks at Fort Lancaster, circa 1857

Within 40 years after being built, the wooden-frame superstructures of some buildings at the fort burned. "Only a few partially extant walls, a chimney, and numerous wall foundations remained in 1912." This was the general condition of the site when the first scientific archeological investigations were conducted in 1966. Archeological excavations were again conducted in 1971, when the site was mapped and test excavations were done. Archeological investigations in 1974 revealed that officers' quarters buildings had wood-plank floors, thresholds, and doorjambs fitted with iron pintles; the assumption is that doors were also of wood. These carbonized remains were left in situ after being exposed during archeological investigations, photographed, and recorded by measured drawings using grid systems tied to "modern" architectural features of the park facilities. The excavation units were stabilized by careful backfilling with soil removed from those units to protect the remains for anticipated future public display. Subsequent archeology in 1975 and 1976 revealed that wooden superstructure and flooring of site's commanding officer's residence and the sutler's store had likewise been destroyed by fire. Architectural details of buildings investigated by archeological excavation 1974-1976 indicate that before the buildings burned, they were all similar in design and construction, as would be expected of military engineering.

== Preservation ==
The ruins of Fort Lancaster were deeded in 1965 to the Crockett County government, which ceded it three years later to the Texas Parks and Wildlife Department (TPWD). The fort was added to the National Register of Historic Places on March 11, 1971.

TPWD architects attempted the first interpretative restoration at the site with modern cement mortar to stabilize the remaining stone walls and cement-fortified adobes to simulate the original plain-mud adobes of the enlisted men's mess hall. Associated with the 1974–1976 archeological investigations and as a preservation measure, the archeologists in 1976 made adobes from untempered mud dug on site with hand tools. These adobes, sized to duplicate the original adobe bricks, were laid atop remaining original adobe walls at some of the officer's quarters on the north side of the parade ground. Remains of these adobes still formed a protective preservative layer as late as April 2010. A budget shortfall prompted the state to yield management of the site to Texas Rural Communities, Incorporated, in 1993. On January 1, 2008, operational control of the site was transferred from TPWD to the Texas Historical Commission, which now manages preservation and public visitation of the site.

== See also ==
- National Register of Historic Places listings in Crockett County, Texas
