= Ozona, Texas =

- Census-designated place
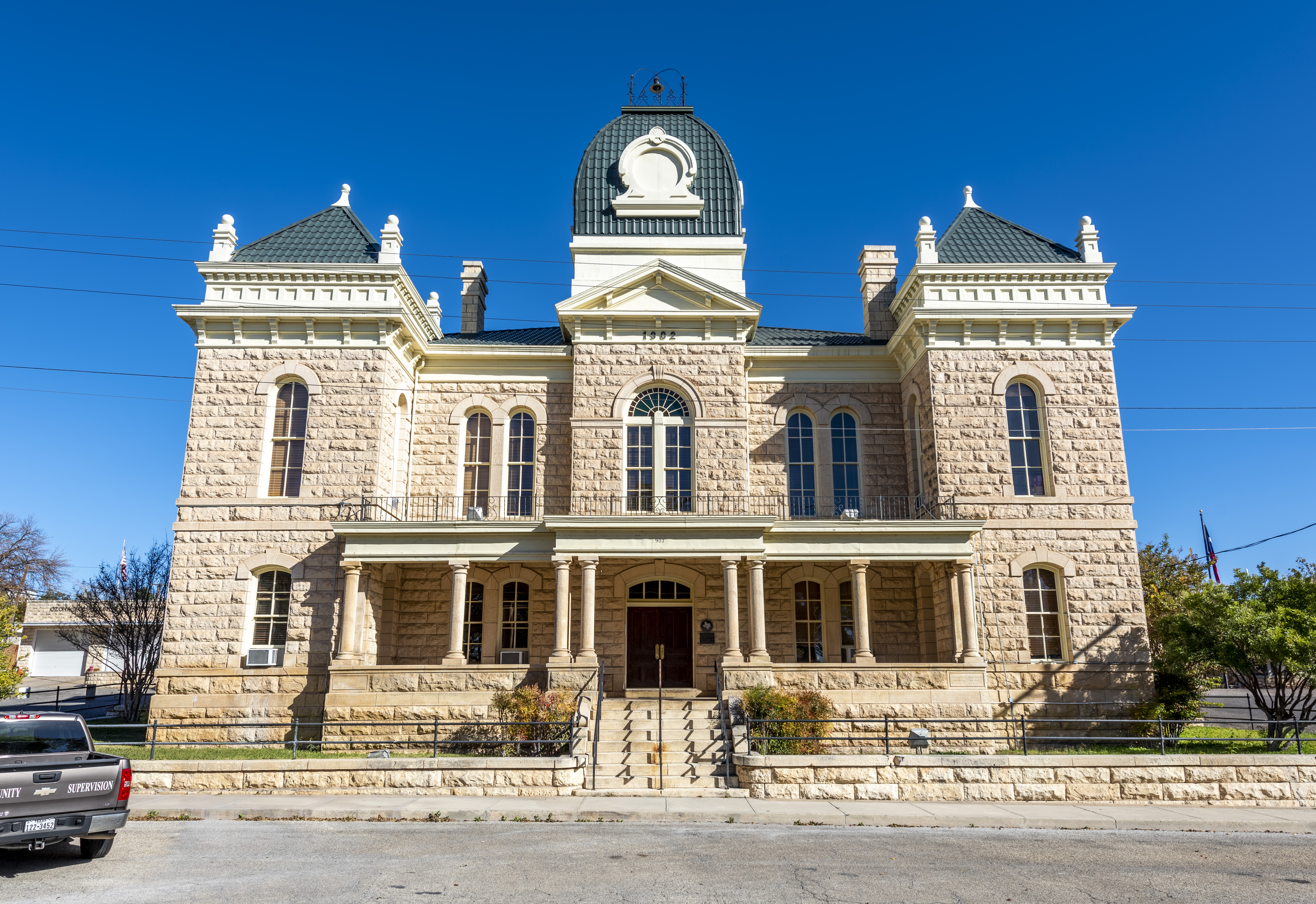
- Crockett County Courthouse
- Motto: "The Biggest Little Town in the World"
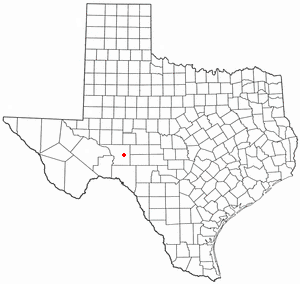
- Location of Ozona, Texas

- Coordinates: 30°42′32″N 101°12′15″W
- Country: United States
- State: Texas
- County: Crockett

Area
  - Total: 4.7 sq mi (12.1 km^{2})
  - Land: 4.7 sq mi (12.1 km^{2})
  - Water: 0 sq mi (0.0 km^{2})
- Elevation: 2,349 ft (716 m)

Population (2020)
  - Total: 2,663
  - Density: 570/sq mi (220/km^{2})
- Time zone: UTC−6 (Central (CST))
  - Summer (DST): UTC−5 (CDT)
- ZIP Code: 76943
- Area code: 325
- FIPS code: 48-54552
- GNIS feature ID: 1364666

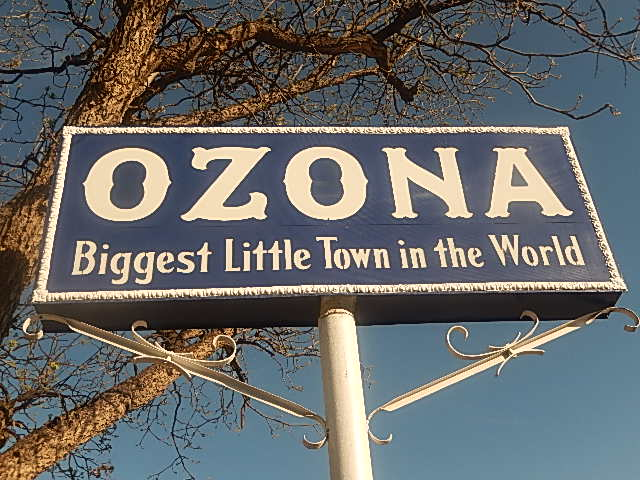
Ozona welcome sign

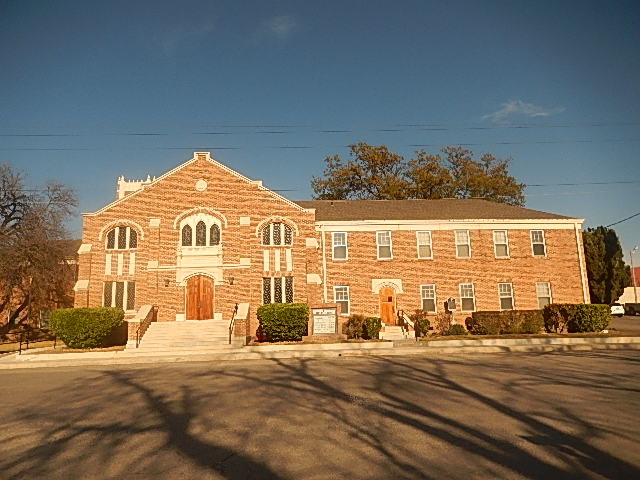
First Baptist Church of Ozona on the town square

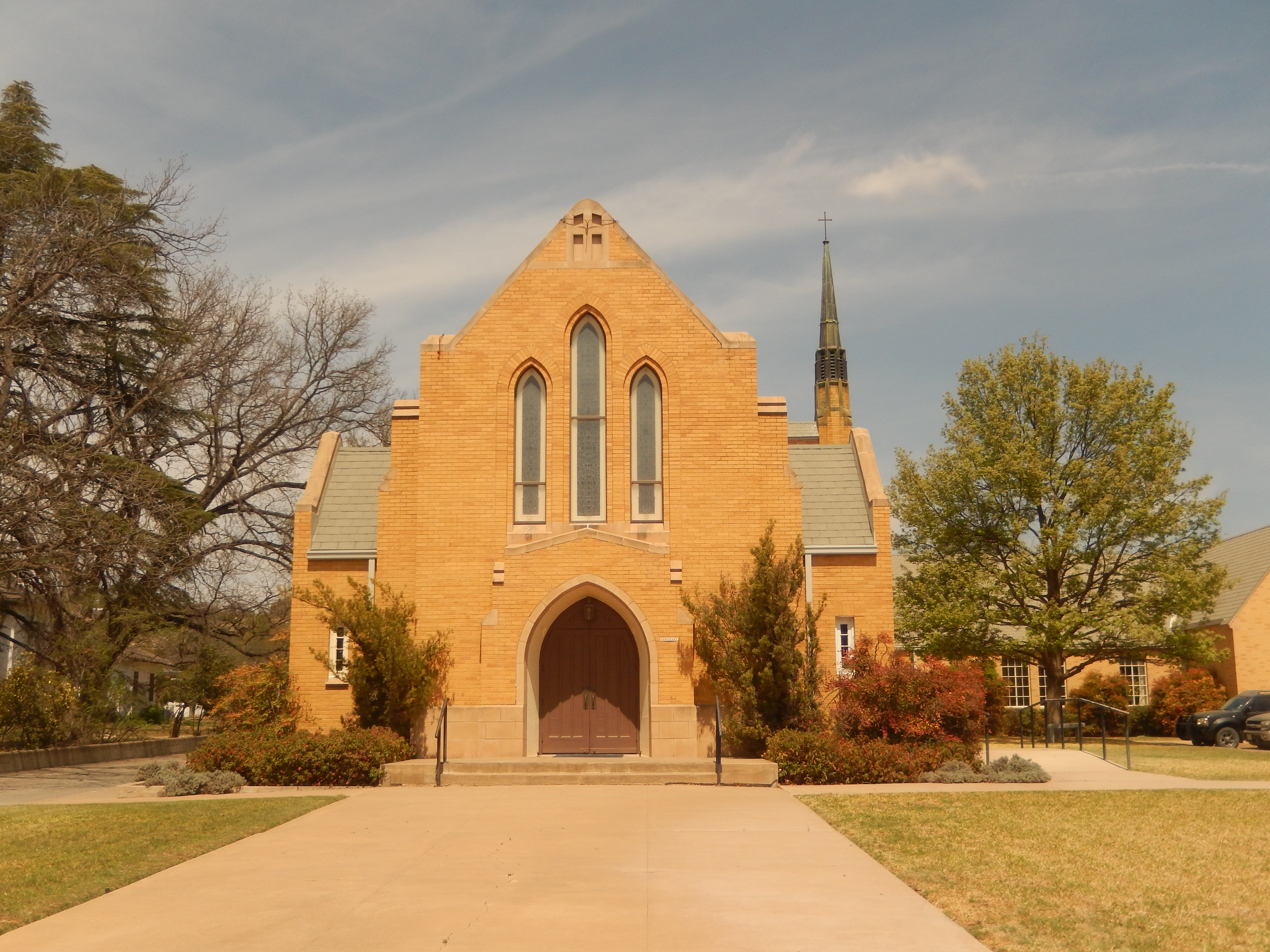
First United Methodist Church of Ozona

Ozona is an unincorporated community and census-designated place (CDP) that serves as the county seat of Crockett County, Texas, United States. The population was 2,663 at the time of the 2020 census. Ozona is the only Census Bureau–recognized community in Crockett County, which is named for Colonel Davy Crockett, a hero of the Alamo.

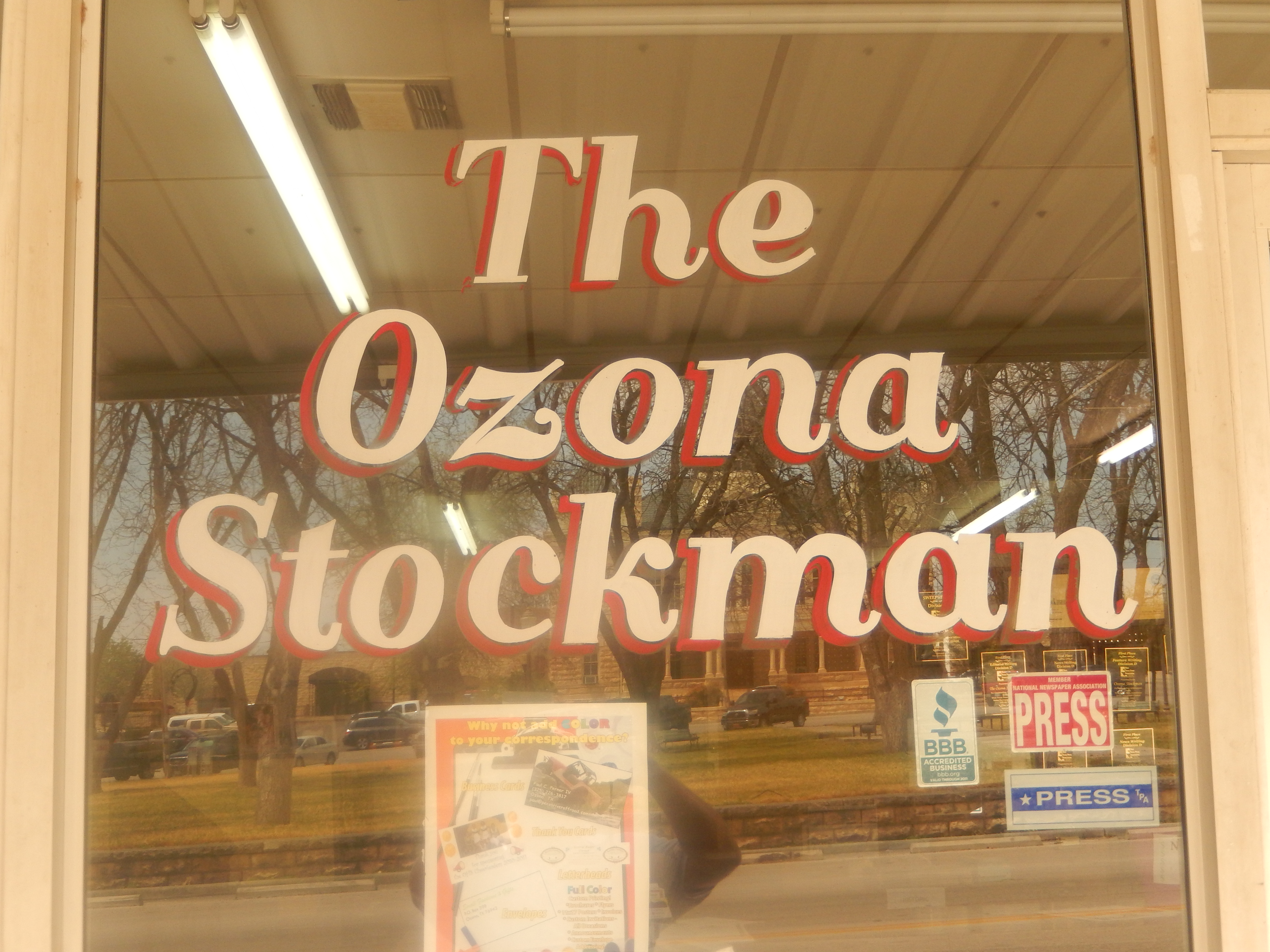
Ozona Stockman newspaper in Ozona

Ozona was known as "Powell Well", after land surveyor E. M. Powell, when it was founded in 1891. In 1897, it was renamed "Ozona" for the high quantity of its open air, or "ozone". A flood in 1954 killed 16 people and destroyed about half of the homes in the town.

== Demographics ==
Historical population
Census	Pop.	Note	%±
1950	2,885		—
1960	3,361		16.5%
1970	2,864		−14.8%
1980	3,766		31.5%
1990	3,181		−15.5%
2000	3,436		8.0%
2010	3,225		−6.1%
2020	2,663		−17.4%
U.S. Decennial Census; 1850–1900 1910; 1920 1930 1940; 1950 1960 1970; 1980 1990 2000; 2010

Ozona first appeared as an unincorporated community in the 1950 U.S. census; and then as a census designated place in the 1980 United States census.

=== 2020 census ===
Ozona CDP, Texas – Racial and ethnic composition Note: the US Census treats Hispanic/Latino as an ethnic category. This table excludes Latinos from the racial categories and assigns them to a separate category. Hispanics/Latinos may be of any race.
Race / Ethnicity (NH = Non-Hispanic)	Pop 2000	Pop 2010	Pop 2020	% 2000	% 2010	% 2020
White alone (NH)	1,313	979	788	38.21%	30.36%	29.59%
Black or African American alone (NH)	18	10	15	0.52%	0.31%	0.56%
Native American or Alaska Native alone (NH)	16	8	9	0.47%	0.25%	0.34%
Asian alone (NH)	10	8	6	0.29%	0.25%	0.23%
Native Hawaiian or Pacific Islander alone (NH)	0	0	0	0.00%	0.00%	0.00%
Other race alone (NH)	0	3	7	0.00%	0.09%	0.26%
Mixed race or Multiracial (NH)	13	16	36	0.38%	0.50%	1.35%
Hispanic or Latino (any race)	2,066	2,201	1,802	60.13%	68.25%	67.67%
Total	3,436	3,225	2,663	100.00%	100.00%	100.00%

As of the 2020 United States census, 2,663 people, 1,214 households, and 842 families were residing in the CDP.

=== 2010 census ===
As of the census of 2010, 3,225 people and 1,273 households were in Crockett County (of which Ozona is the only town and county seat), with 1,859 housing units. The racial makeup of Crockett County was 94.7% White, 1.7% African American, 0.8% Asian, 1.8% American Indian and Alaska Native, 0.1% Pacific Islander, and 0.9% from two or more races. Hispanics or Latinos of any race were 64.2% of the population and 33.9% were White, not Hispanic or Latino, in the county.

=== 2000 census ===
Of the 1,255 households in 2000, 38.4% had children under 18 living with them, 58.7% were married couples living together, 10.7% had a female householder with no husband present, and 26.7% were not families. About 24.8% of all households were made up of individuals, and 12.7% had someone living alone who was 65 or older. The average household size was 2.81. Females were 50.6% of the population.

In the CDP, the population was distributed as 30.3% under 18, 7.4% from 18 to 24, 26.8% from 25 to 44, 23.1% from 45 to 64, and 12.4% who were 65 or older. The median age was 36 years.

The median income in the CDP for a household was $49,850; males had a median income of $30,988 versus $14,024 for females. The per capita income was $13,152. About 16.8% of families and 21.5% of the population were below the poverty line, including 27.0% of those under 18 and 20.5% of those 65 or over.

== Education ==
Ozona is served by the Crockett County Consolidated Common School District; the district is designated as Class 2A D1 by the University Interscholastic League. District students are active in University Interscholastic League academic and athletic activities. Due to the small student numbers, they often participate in more than one concurrently offered sport in addition to other UIL academic events and school-sponsored events and clubs.

Ozona High School students have won or placed in the top three at state competitions in debate, speaking events, and journalism. The Ozona High School Band has been awarded numerous honors at both the regional and state levels. The Ozona Lady Lions have been Class 2A state champions in 1995 and 1996 in basketball and in 1997 in golf. The Ozona Lions have been state champions as a team in cross-country running in Class 2A in 2004 and then Class 1A in 2013.

== Geography ==
Ozona is located in east-central Crockett County at 30°42′32″N 101°12′15″W (30.708972, -101.204069). According to the United States Census Bureau, the CDP has a total area of 4.7 square miles (12.1 km^{2}), all land. Most of the town is in the valley called Johnson Draw, while a portion extends east up Gurley Draw. Johnson Draw runs south to the Devils River, a tributary of the Rio Grande in Val Verde County.

Interstate 10 passes just south of the center of town, with access from exits 363, 365, and 368. I-10 leads east 35 miles (56 km) to Sonora and west 108 miles (174 km) to Fort Stockton. Texas State Highway 163 runs through the center of Ozona, leading north 30 miles (48 km) to Barnhart and south 82 miles (132 km) to Comstock.

== Climate ==
According to the Köppen Climate Classification system, Ozona has a hot semi-arid climate, abbreviated "BSh" on climate maps. The hottest temperature recorded in Ozona was 109 °F (42.8 °C) on August 8, 1951, August 21, 1951, and August 18, 1969, while the coldest temperature recorded was −8 °F (−22.2 °C) on February 2, 1951.

Climate data for Ozona, Texas, 1991–2020 normals, extremes 1948–2013
Month	Jan	Feb	Mar	Apr	May	Jun	Jul	Aug	Sep	Oct	Nov	Dec	Year
Record high °F (°C)	87 (31)	93 (34)	97 (36)	102 (39)	107 (42)	108 (42)	108 (42)	109 (43)	107 (42)	98 (37)	90 (32)	90 (32)	109 (43)
Mean maximum °F (°C)	76.3 (24.6)	80.9 (27.2)	86.5 (30.3)	93.4 (34.1)	98.5 (36.9)	100.0 (37.8)	99.9 (37.7)	100.1 (37.8)	95.9 (35.5)	90.0 (32.2)	82.7 (28.2)	75.8 (24.3)	102.9 (39.4)
Mean daily maximum °F (°C)	59.9 (15.5)	64.3 (17.9)	71.4 (21.9)	79.8 (26.6)	86.8 (30.4)	92.9 (33.8)	94.4 (34.7)	94.0 (34.4)	88.7 (31.5)	78.9 (26.1)	67.4 (19.7)	60.1 (15.6)	78.2 (25.7)
Daily mean °F (°C)	44.9 (7.2)	49.2 (9.6)	56.8 (13.8)	65.2 (18.4)	74.0 (23.3)	80.8 (27.1)	82.4 (28.0)	81.8 (27.7)	75.8 (24.3)	65.2 (18.4)	53.3 (11.8)	45.8 (7.7)	64.6 (18.1)
Mean daily minimum °F (°C)	30.0 (−1.1)	34.1 (1.2)	42.2 (5.7)	50.6 (10.3)	61.1 (16.2)	68.7 (20.4)	70.3 (21.3)	69.5 (20.8)	62.8 (17.1)	51.6 (10.9)	39.2 (4.0)	31.6 (−0.2)	51.0 (10.6)
Mean minimum °F (°C)	15.7 (−9.1)	18.4 (−7.6)	23.6 (−4.7)	32.2 (0.1)	44.7 (7.1)	57.1 (13.9)	61.1 (16.2)	61.1 (16.2)	45.2 (7.3)	34.0 (1.1)	21.5 (−5.8)	14.8 (−9.6)	11.7 (−11.3)
Record low °F (°C)	−4 (−20)	−8 (−22)	8 (−13)	19 (−7)	31 (−1)	45 (7)	50 (10)	51 (11)	34 (1)	20 (−7)	8 (−13)	−2 (−19)	−8 (−22)
Average precipitation inches (mm)	0.96 (24)	0.88 (22)	1.96 (50)	1.78 (45)	2.81 (71)	1.95 (50)	1.25 (32)	1.81 (46)	2.14 (54)	2.24 (57)	1.26 (32)	0.80 (20)	19.84 (503)
Average snowfall inches (cm)	0.1 (0.25)	0.0 (0.0)	0.0 (0.0)	0.0 (0.0)	0.0 (0.0)	0.0 (0.0)	0.0 (0.0)	0.0 (0.0)	0.0 (0.0)	0.1 (0.25)	0.2 (0.51)	0.0 (0.0)	0.4 (1.01)
Average precipitation days (≥ 0.01 in)	2.9	3.0	3.6	3.1	3.5	3.7	3.3	4.4	3.4	3.1	2.5	2.9	39.4
Average snowy days (≥ 0.1 in)	0.0	0.0	0.0	0.0	0.0	0.0	0.0	0.0	0.0	0.0	0.1	0.0	0.1
Source 1: NOAA (snow/snow days 1981–2010)
Source 2: XMACIS2 (mean maxima/minima 1981–2010)

== In popular culture ==
In the Criminal Minds season-two episode-six (S2, E6) titled, "Boogeyman", the BAU travels to Ozona as part of a murder investigation involving a boy who was killed in the "woods" on the outskirts of town.

British rock band Goldrush recorded an album called Ozona, based on their experiences when their tour bus broke down in the town.

In Cormac McCarthy's All the Pretty Horses, John Grady Cole is held in Ozona after Redbo, Junior, and Blevins' horses are impounded after three men swear they have paperwork confirming ownership of the animals. He is eventually given the horses after John Grady tells the story of the plot to the local judge. In the film adaptation of the novel, the hearing takes place in another town.

New Orleans jazzrock trio, Royal Fingerbowl, featured a song called "Ozona, TX" on their 1997 album Happy Birthday, Sabo, about a hallucinating, dying cowboy.
