= Crockett County, Texas =

County in Texas, United States

- County
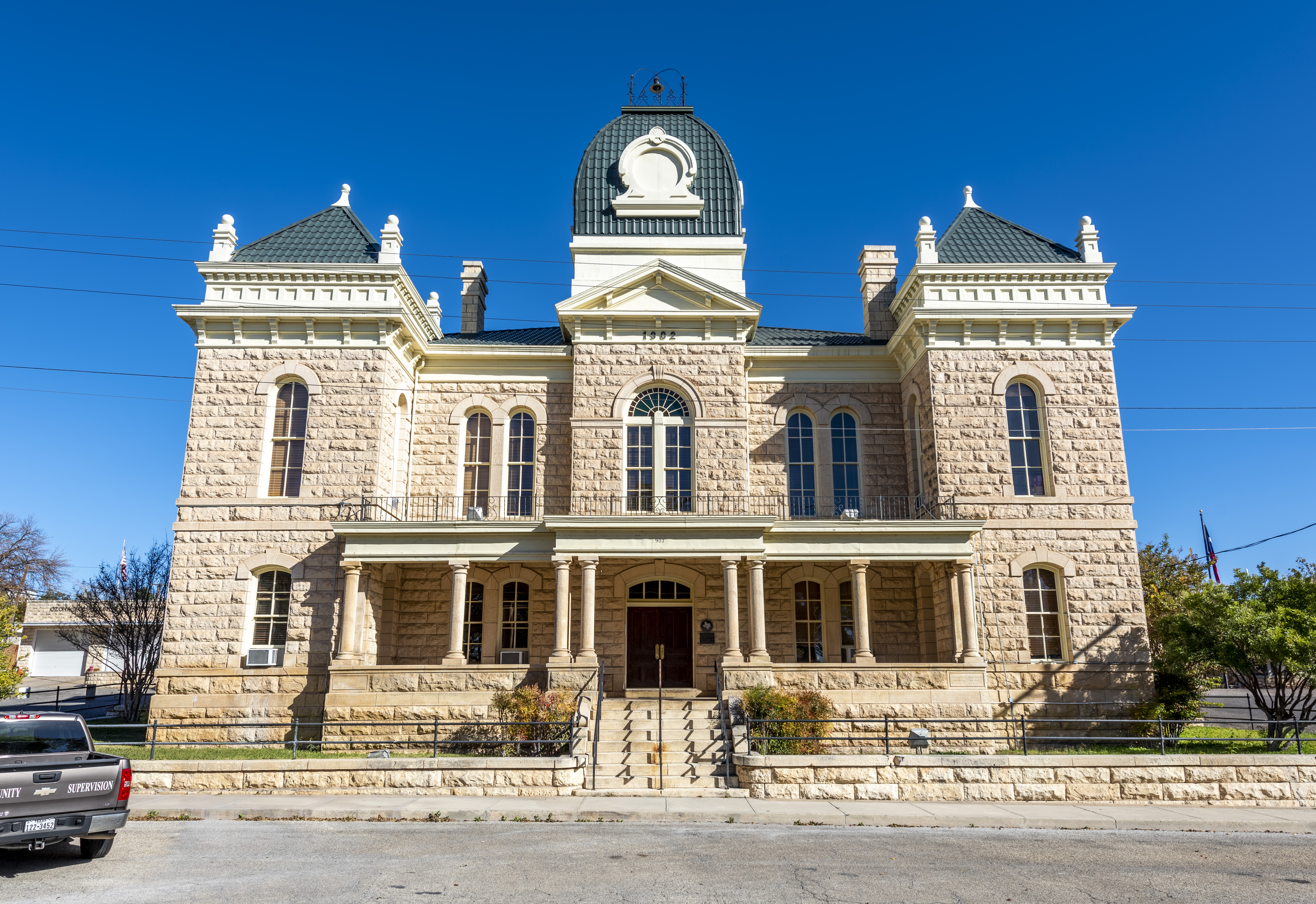
- The Crockett County Courthouse in Ozona

- Location within the U.S. state of Texas
- Coordinates: 30°44′N 101°25′W
- Country: United States
- State: Texas
- Founded: 1891
- Named for: Davy Crockett
- Seat: Ozona
- Largest community: Ozona

Area
  - Total: 2,807 sq mi (7,270 km^{2})
  - Land: 2,807 sq mi (7,270 km^{2})
  - Water: 0.02 sq mi (0.052 km^{2}) 0.0%

Population (2020)
  - Total: 3,098
  - Estimate (2025): 2,769 ▼
  - Density: 1.104/sq mi (0.4261/km^{2})
- Time zone: UTC−6 (Central)
  - Summer (DST): UTC−5 (CDT)
- Congressional district: 23rd
- Website: www.co.crockett.tx.us

Crockett County is a county located on the Edwards Plateau in the U.S. state of Texas. As of the 2020 census, its population was 3,098. The county seat is Ozona. The county was founded in 1875 and later organized in 1891. It is named in honor of Davy Crockett, the frontiersman who died at the Battle of the Alamo.

== History ==
Prehistoric people lived in Gobbler Shelter, located on a small tributary canyon of Live Oak Creek. The earliest known Native American tribes were the Tonkawa, Lipan Apache, and Comanche.

In 1590, Spanish explorer Gaspar Castaño de Sosa led a mining expedition of 170 who passed through the western section of Crockett County to reach the Pecos River. On May 22, 1684, Juan Domínguez de Mendoza and his expedition crossed the Pecos River and camped at San Pantaleón.

John Coffee Hays's 1849 expedition charted waterholes for transporting people and freight., and three years later, U.S. Army Colonel Joseph K. Mansfield recommended establishing a new post on Live Oak Creek to protect travelers. Fort Lancaster was established on August 20, 1855, in response to Mansfield's recommendation. In 1866, the Texas legislature provided three battalions of Texas Rangers to protect settlers in the area. Camp Melvin was established in 1868.

On January 12, 1875, Crockett County, named for Davy Crockett, was formed from Bexar County. Crockett County became a subsidiary of Val Verde County in 1885, and in 1887 was reduced further as Sutton and Schleicher counties were formed from part of its territory. In 1889, Emerald became the first town in Crockett County. Crockett County was organized in 1891, with Ozona serving as the county seat. The first water well was drilled at the First Baptist Church in Ozona that same year.

One of the first settlers was W. P. Hoover, who settled on the Pecos River in 1885. Throughout the next decade, sheep and cattle ranchers established themselves in the county. The Kirkpatrick Hotel was built to serve stagecoach passengers and cowboys. Stagecoach services began running in 1900, and contemporary county reports listed seven manufacturing firms. The Crockett County Courthouse was built in 1902 by architect Oscar Ruffini. The building does multiple duty for courtroom and county offices, as well as a community center and dance hall.

In 1925, the first producing oil well in the world, on L. P. Powell's ranch in north-central Crockett County, by Chester R. Bunker's World Oil Company. Ozona erected a statue of Davy Crockett in the town square in 1938 and opened the Crockett County Museum the following year. In 1958, it was moved to its current location on the town square.

== Geography ==
According to the U.S. Census Bureau, the county has a total area of 2,807 square miles (7,270 km^{2}), virtually all of which is land.

=== Major highways ===
- Interstate 10
- U.S. Highway 67
- U.S. Highway 190
- State Highway 137
- State Highway 290
- State Highway 163
- State Highway 349
- Loop 466

=== Adjacent counties ===
- Upton County (north)
- Reagan County (north)
- Irion County (northeast)
- Schleicher County (east)
- Sutton County (east)
- Val Verde County (south)
- Terrell County (south)
- Pecos County (west)
- Crane County (northwest)

Crockett County is among the few counties in the United States to border as many as nine counties.

== Demographics ==
Historical population
Census	Pop.	Note	%±
1880	127		—
1890	194		52.8%
1900	1,591		720.1%
1910	1,296		−18.5%
1920	1,500		15.7%
1930	2,590		72.7%
1940	2,809		8.5%
1950	3,981		41.7%
1960	4,209		5.7%
1970	3,885		−7.7%
1980	4,608		18.6%
1990	4,078		−11.5%
2000	4,099		0.5%
2010	3,719		−9.3%
2020	3,098		−16.7%
2025 (est.)	2,769	▼	−10.6%
U.S. Decennial Census; 1850–2010 2010 2020

=== 2020 census ===
As of the 2020 census, the county had a population of 3,098. The median age was 43.2 years; 22.7% of the residents were under 18 and 21.6% were 65 or older. The female/male ratio was 1:1.001 males, and the 18 and over female/male ratio was 1:0.953.

The racial makeup of the county was 60.7% White, 0.6% Black or African American, 1.0% American Indian and Alaska Native, 0.3% Asian, <0.1% Native Hawaiian and Pacific Islander, 14.6% from some other race, and 22.8% from two or more races. Hispanic or Latino residents of any race comprised 62.0% of the population.

About 0.1% of the residents lived in urban areas, while almost all lived in rural areas.

Of the 1,211 households in the county, 34.2% had children under 18 living in them, 54.0% were married-couple households, 19.0% were households with a male householder and no spouse or partner present, and 23.0% were households with a female householder and no spouse or partner present. About 25.0% of all households were made up of individuals, and 12.9% had someone living alone who was 65 or older.

The county had 1,592 housing units, of which 23.9% were vacant. Among occupied housing units, 75.0% were owner-occupied and 25.0% were renter-occupied. The homeowner vacancy rate was 1.9% and the rental vacancy rate was 23.6%.

=== Racial and ethnic composition ===
Crockett County, Texas – Racial and ethnic composition Note: the US Census treats Hispanic/Latino as an ethnic category. This table excludes Latinos from the racial categories and assigns them to a separate category. Hispanics/Latinos may be of any race.
Race / Ethnicity (NH = Non-Hispanic)	Pop 1980	Pop 1990	Pop 2000	Pop 2010	Pop 2020	% 1980	% 1990	% 2000	% 2010	% 2020
White alone (NH)	2,479	2,016	1,792	1,312	1,080	53.80%	49.44%	43.72%	35.28%	34.86%
Black or African American alone (NH)	50	31	18	13	18	1.09%	0.76%	0.44%	0.35%	0.58%
Native American or Alaska Native alone (NH)	20	8	17	8	9	0.43%	0.20%	0.41%	0.22%	0.29%
Asian alone (NH)	3	2	10	11	10	0.07%	0.05%	0.24%	0.30%	0.32%
Native Hawaiian or Pacific Islander alone (NH)	x	x	0	0	0	x	x	0.00%	0.00%	0.00%
Other race alone (NH)	3	0	4	4	9	0.07%	0.00%	0.10%	0.11%	0.29%
Multiracial (NH)	x	x	16	19	52	x	x	0.39%	0.51%	1.68%
Hispanic or Latino (any race)	2,053	2,021	2,242	2,352	1,920	44.55%	49.56%	54.70%	63.24%	61.98%
Total	4,608	4,078	4,099	3,719	3,098	100.00%	100.00%	100.00%	100.00%	100.00%

=== 2000 census ===
As of the 2000 census, 4,099 people, 1,524 households, and 1,114 families were residing in the county. The population density was 1.46 people per square mile (0.56 people/km^{2}). The 2,049 housing units had an average density of 0.73 per square mile (0.28/km^{2}). The racial makeup of the county was 76.34% White, 0.68% Black or African American, 0.59% Native American, 0.27% Asian, 0.02% Pacific Islander, 19.71% from other races, and 2.39% from two or more races. About 54.70% of the population were Hispanic or Latino of any race.

Of the 1,524 households, 36.5% had children under 18 living with them, 60.3% were married couples living together, 9.3% had a female householder with no husband present, and 26.9% were not families. About 24.7% of all households were made up of individuals, and 11.8% had someone living alone who was 65 or older. The average household size was 2.65, and the average family size was 3.19.

In the county, the age distribution was 28.9% under 18, 7.1% from 18 to 24, 26.4% from 25 to 44, 24.7% from 45 to 64, and 12.9% who were 65 or older. The median age was 37 years. The female/male ratio was 1:0.982 males;, the 18 and over ratio was 1:0.976.

The median income in the county for a household was $29,355 and for a family was $34,653. Males had a median income of $29,925 versus $14,695 for females. The per capita income for the county was $14,414. About 14.9% of families and 19.4% of the population were below the poverty line, including 24.3% of those under 18 and 18.2% of those 65 or over.

== Communities ==
=== Census-designated place ===
- Ozona (county seat)

=== Ghost town ===
- Emerald

== Politics ==
United States presidential election results for Crockett County, Texas
Year	Republican		Democratic		Third party(ies)	
Year	No.	%	No.	%	No.	%
1912	5	8.06%	53	85.48%	4	6.45%
1916	16	18.60%	65	75.58%	5	5.81%
1920	80	46.78%	89	52.05%	2	1.17%
1924	112	61.54%	69	37.91%	1	0.55%
1928	291	81.97%	64	18.03%	0	0.00%
1932	168	33.80%	329	66.20%	0	0.00%
1936	75	24.35%	231	75.00%	2	0.65%
1940	132	23.91%	420	76.09%	0	0.00%
1944	112	22.76%	323	65.65%	57	11.59%
1948	127	23.30%	400	73.39%	18	3.30%
1952	654	68.13%	306	31.88%	0	0.00%
1956	702	69.57%	305	30.23%	2	0.20%
1960	635	54.93%	517	44.72%	4	0.35%
1964	409	33.77%	799	65.98%	3	0.25%
1968	509	37.45%	571	42.02%	279	20.53%
1972	851	72.12%	329	27.88%	0	0.00%
1976	802	49.88%	804	50.00%	2	0.12%
1980	885	59.24%	595	39.83%	14	0.94%
1984	1,094	64.96%	589	34.98%	1	0.06%
1988	932	51.24%	881	48.43%	6	0.33%
1992	623	37.87%	653	39.70%	369	22.43%
1996	714	45.98%	684	44.04%	155	9.98%
2000	924	66.09%	467	33.40%	7	0.50%
2004	1,248	72.22%	473	27.37%	7	0.41%
2008	1,026	66.41%	512	33.14%	7	0.45%
2012	957	65.68%	480	32.94%	20	1.37%
2016	980	70.25%	372	26.67%	43	3.08%
2020	1,220	77.51%	344	21.86%	10	0.64%
2024	1,087	76.71%	323	22.79%	7	0.49%

United States Senate election results for Crockett County, Texas1
Year	Republican		Democratic		Third party(ies)	
Year	No.	%	No.	%	No.	%
2024	1,008	73.42%	328	23.89%	37	2.69%

United States Senate election results for Crockett County, Texas2
Year	Republican		Democratic		Third party(ies)	
Year	No.	%	No.	%	No.	%
2020	1,146	76.76%	314	21.03%	33	2.21%

Texas Gubernatorial election results for Crockett County
Year	Republican		Democratic		Third party(ies)	
Year	No.	%	No.	%	No.	%
2022	964	75.73%	276	21.68%	33	2.59%

== See also ==
- List of museums in Central Texas
- National Register of Historic Places listings in Crockett County, Texas
- Recorded Texas Historic Landmarks in Crockett County
