= Butterfield Overland Mail in Texas =

Route of mail service created in 1857

Butterfield Overland Mail
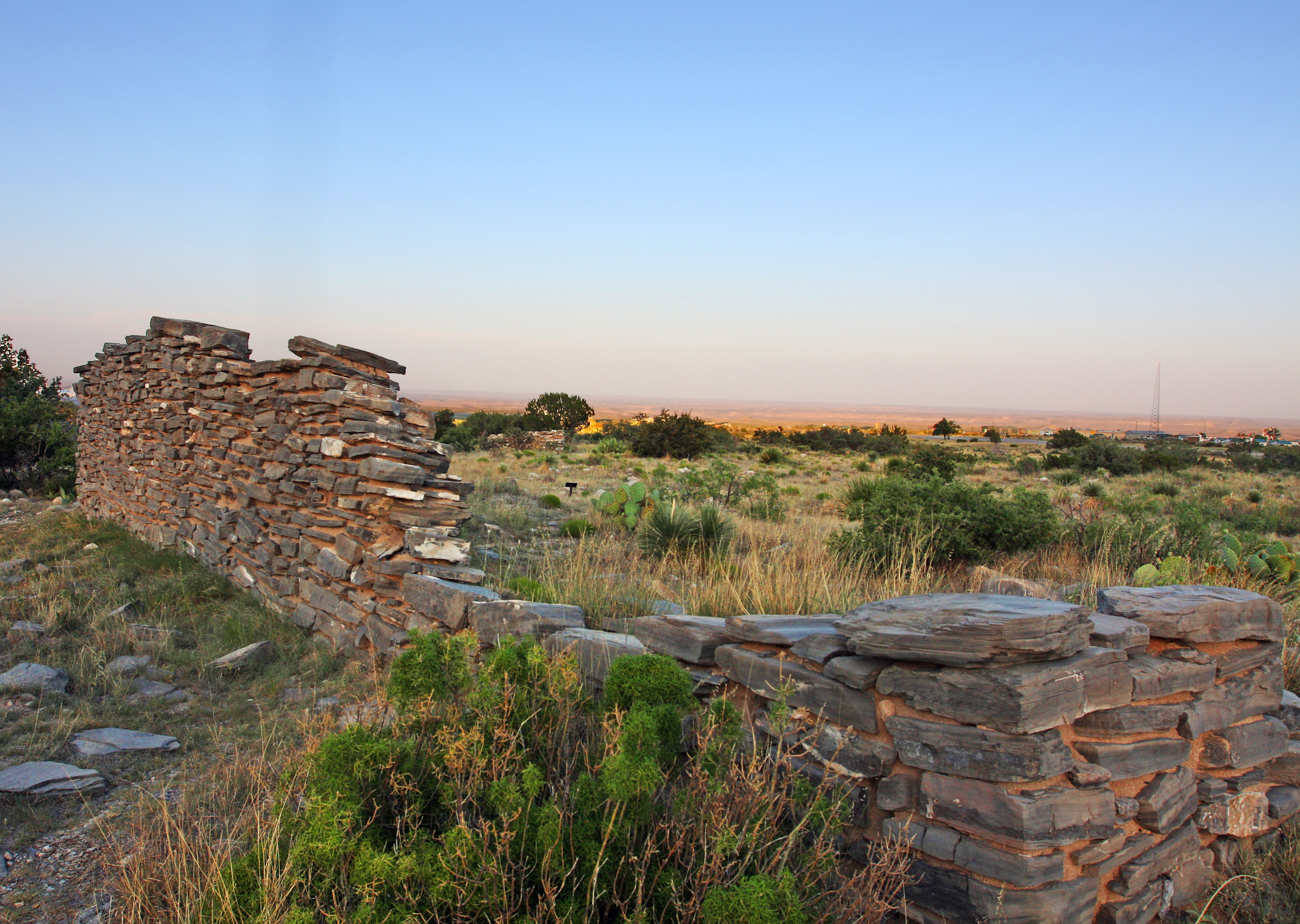
- Pinery Station in Guadalupe Mountains National Park

- Location of Butterfield Overland Mail Corridor Butterfield Overland Mail in Texas (the United States)
- 31°53′36″N 104°48′57″W
- Type: historic trail
- Location: New Mexico Territory near Anthony - Indian Territory near Sherman

U.S. National Register of Historic Places
- Official name: Butterfield Overland Mail Corridor
- Type: U.S. historic district
- Designated: August 27, 2014
- Reference no.: 14000524
- Location: 400 Pine Canyon Rd. Guadalupe Mountains National Park
- Area: 2,401.3 acres (971.8 ha)

In Texas, the Butterfield Overland Mail service created by Congress on March 3, 1857, was operated until March 30, 1861.

The route that was operated extended from San Francisco, California to Los Angeles, then across the Colorado Desert to Fort Yuma, then across New Mexico Territory via, Tucson and Mesilla, New Mexico to Franklin, Texas, midpoint on the route. The route through Texas followed first the northern route to the Pecos River and downstream to Horse Head Crossing. The route in West Texas was changed in 1859, in order to secure a better water supply on the route and to provide mail service to a more settled area, the stages between Franklin, and the Pecos River followed the San Antonio-El Paso Road to Camp Stockton and then turned east to Horsehead Crossing. From Horsehead Crossing the route crossed Texas to the Red River and into Indian Territory. In 1860 the route was changed to another route from Jacksboro to Sherman via Decatur due to the building of a new toll bridge at Bridgeport, that avoided delays crossing the West Fork of the Trinity River when it was flooded. From Colberts Ferry the route went on to Fort Smith, then up across Arkansas and southwest Missouri to Tipton with the final leg by train to St. Louis. The Texas mail route was so long that the route there, like that in California, was divided into two divisions each under a superintendent.

== 5th Division Route ==
At first the 5th Division route left Franklin to run due east thirty miles to Hueco Tanks, thirty six miles to Cornudas de Los Alamos then east northeast fifty-six miles to Pinery Station.

Subsequently, stations were added between Hueco Tanks and Cornudas de Los Alamos at Ojos de los Alamos, and at Crow Springs between Cornudas de Los Alamos and Pinery. From Pinery, the route then ran twenty-four miles east to Delaware Springs Station, then forty miles down Delaware Creek nearly to its junction with the Pecos River, and across Pope's Crossing to Pope's Camp.

It then ran sixty five miles down the east bank of the Pecos, to Emigrant Crossing Station and onward fifty-five miles to Horsehead Crossing. Sections of this route, including Pinery Station, are preserved as part of Guadalupe Mountains National Park, and have been listed on the National Register of Historic Places.

From Horsehead Crossing the trail ran seventy waterless miles east northeast across the Llano Estacado to the headwaters of the Middle Concho River, then northward, about thirty miles to Johnson's Station, along the Middle Concho river. Then, it ran through the vicinity of modern Carlsbad, to Grape Creek Station, near the south line of present Coke County; to Fort Chadbourne in what is now Coke County.

In August 1859, the route in West Texas was changed from the upper route in order to secure a better water supply on the route, with more security from the Army and to provide mail service to a more settled area, by using the San Antonio-El Paso Road from Franklin to Camp Stockton before cutting across to link up with the rest of the route at Horsehead Crossing. This entailed abandoning the investment in the well constructed stations on the old route, and building some on the new route. Although this was mitigated when an arraignment was made to use the stations of George H. Giddings' San Antonio-El Paso Mail along that route. Losses from this change and debt taken on from a delay of postal revenue, eventually led the investors in the Overland Mail Company to take control and dismiss John Warren Butterfield in 1860.

The stages between Franklin and the Pecos River now would follow the San Antonio-El Paso Road down the Rio Grande, 14 miles from Franklin to Ysleta, then passing 12 1/4 miles through Socorro to San Elizario, then on 10 1/2 miles to Camp Hawkins Station, 24 1/2 miles to Birchville Station, 15 miles to Camp Rice Station, then 18 miles to Fort Quitman. Moving eastward away from the river at Fargo Station 5 1/2 miles below Fort Quitman, the route traveled 25 1/2 miles to Eagle Spring, 19 miles to Van Horns Wells, then a waterless 33 miles to Deadman's Hole, 18 miles to Barrel Springs, another 18 miles to Fort Davis. From Fort Davis Station the route proceeded down through Limpia Canyon to Limpia Station, Barrilla Springs, then 34 miles to Leon Springs and 8 1/2 miles on to Camp Stockton. 11 miles east of Camp Stockton the route reached Camp Pleasant then crossed the plain 23 miles to Horsehead Crossing where a ferry carried the coaches across the Pecos River to Horsehead Crossing Station.

== 6th Division Route ==
The 6th Division route ran from Fort Chadbourne, twelve miles to the north across Valley Creek to Station #1 then sixteen miles to Mountain Pass Station, then thirty miles, past the route of the Texas and Pacific Railway, a mile west of the site of present Tye, to Fort Phantom Hill, then twelve miles more to Smith's Station, twenty six miles to Clear Fork station, thirteen miles to Franz's Station and then twenty-two miles to Fort Belknap. From Fort Belknap the line turned eastward sixteen miles to Murphy's Station (near present Graham, Texas), then nineteen miles to Jacksboro, Texas, sixteen miles to Earhart's Station, twenty-four miles to Davidson's Station, then seventeen miles to Gainesville, Texas, fifteen miles to Diamond's station (one mile west of the site of present Whitesboro), fifteen miles to Sherman and across the Red River at Colbert's Ferry, eight miles below Preston, Texas to Indian Territory.

== Stations in Texas ==
=== 4th Division ===
- Cottonwoods Station - Located, 25 miles from Fort Filmore on the Rio Grande in Texas.

=== 5th Division ===
- Franklin Station - Located in Franklin, Texas, 22 miles from Cottonwoods Station. - Midway point of the Overland Mail route and headquarters of the 5th Division.

==== Captain Pope's New Road ====
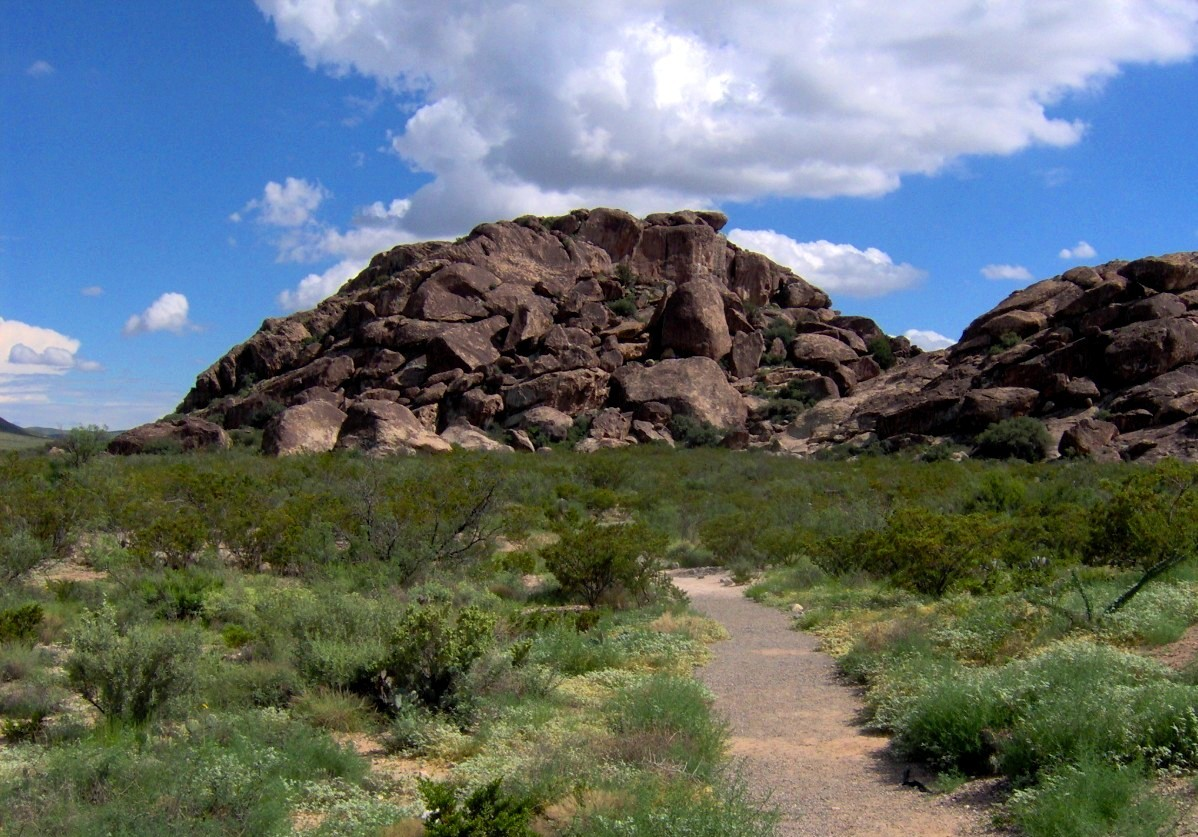
East Mountain at Hueco Tanks State Historic Site

Captain Pope's New Road ran from Franklin to Horse Head Crossing Station (1st route used, until August 1, 1859 when route was moved to the Lower Road.)

- Hueco Tanks Station - Located 30 miles from Franklin.
  - Ojos de los Alamos Station - A later station, located 20 miles east of Hueco Tanks Station in New Mexico.
- Cornudas de Los Alamos Station - Located 36 miles from Hueco Tanks in New Mexico.
  - Crow Springs Station - A relay station east of Cornudas Station midway to Pinery Station, only used in 1858, provided water to Cornudas de Los Alamos and Ojos de los Alamos Stations

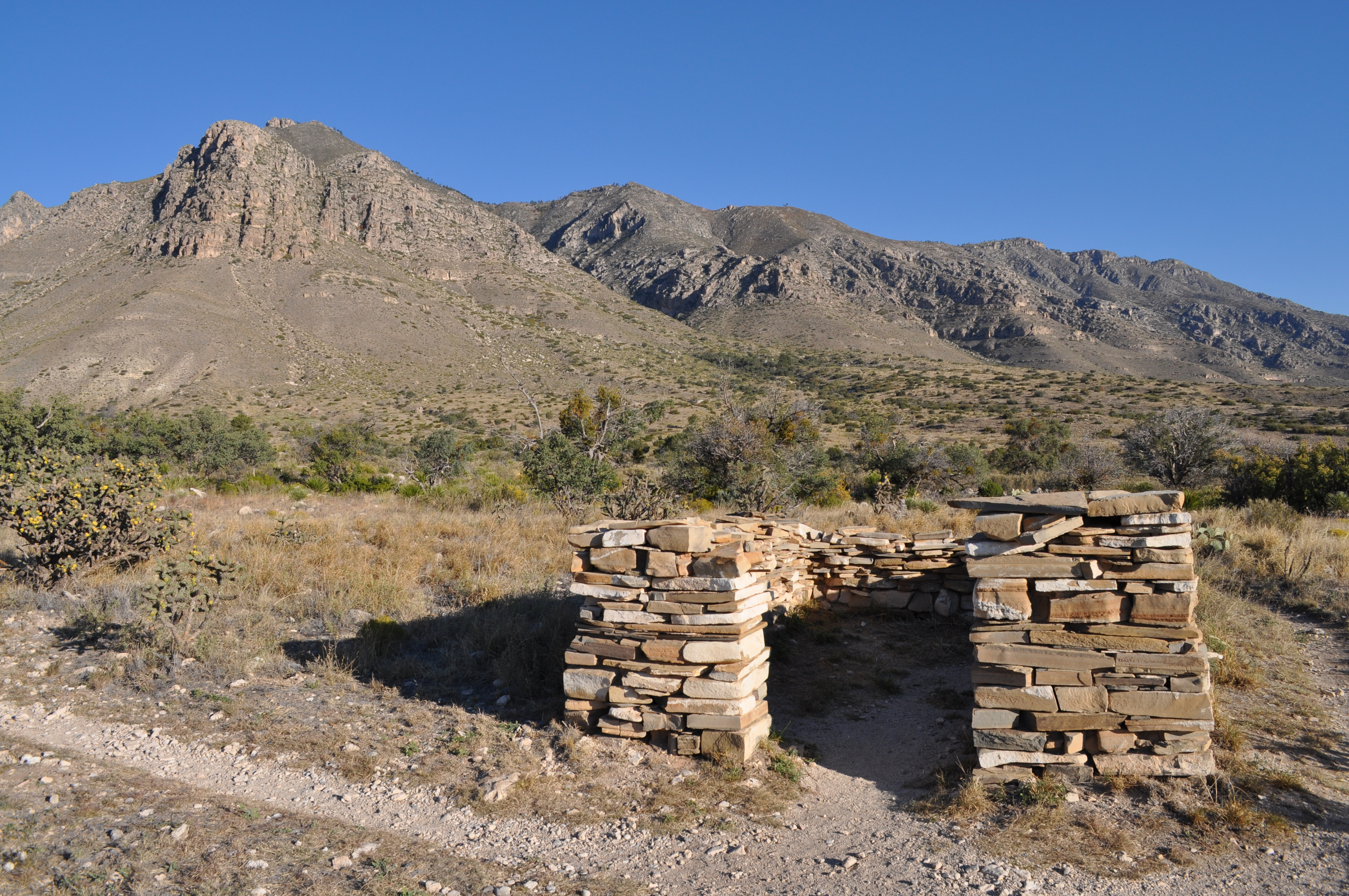
Ruins at The Pinery in Guadalupe Mountains National Park

- Pinery Station - Located 56 miles from Cornudas, just east of Guadelupe Pass no water on the route except at station.
  - Independence Spring - Spring located 5 miles from Pinery Station.
- Delaware Springs Station - Located 24 miles from Pinery Station.
- Pope's Crossing of the Pecos River - Located 36 miles from Delaware Springs, 2 miles from Pope's Camp Station
- Pope's Camp Station - Located 38 miles from Delaware Springs, on the east bank of the Pecos River.
  - Skillman's Station - Later station, located 25 miles from Pope's Camp, 35 miles from Emigrant Crossing Station
- Emigrant Crossing Station - Located 60 miles from Pope's Camp, 35 miles from Skillman's Station.
  - Langston's Station - Later station, located 25.5 miles from Emigrant Crossing Station, 29.5 miles from Horsehead Crossing Station.

==== Lower Road ====
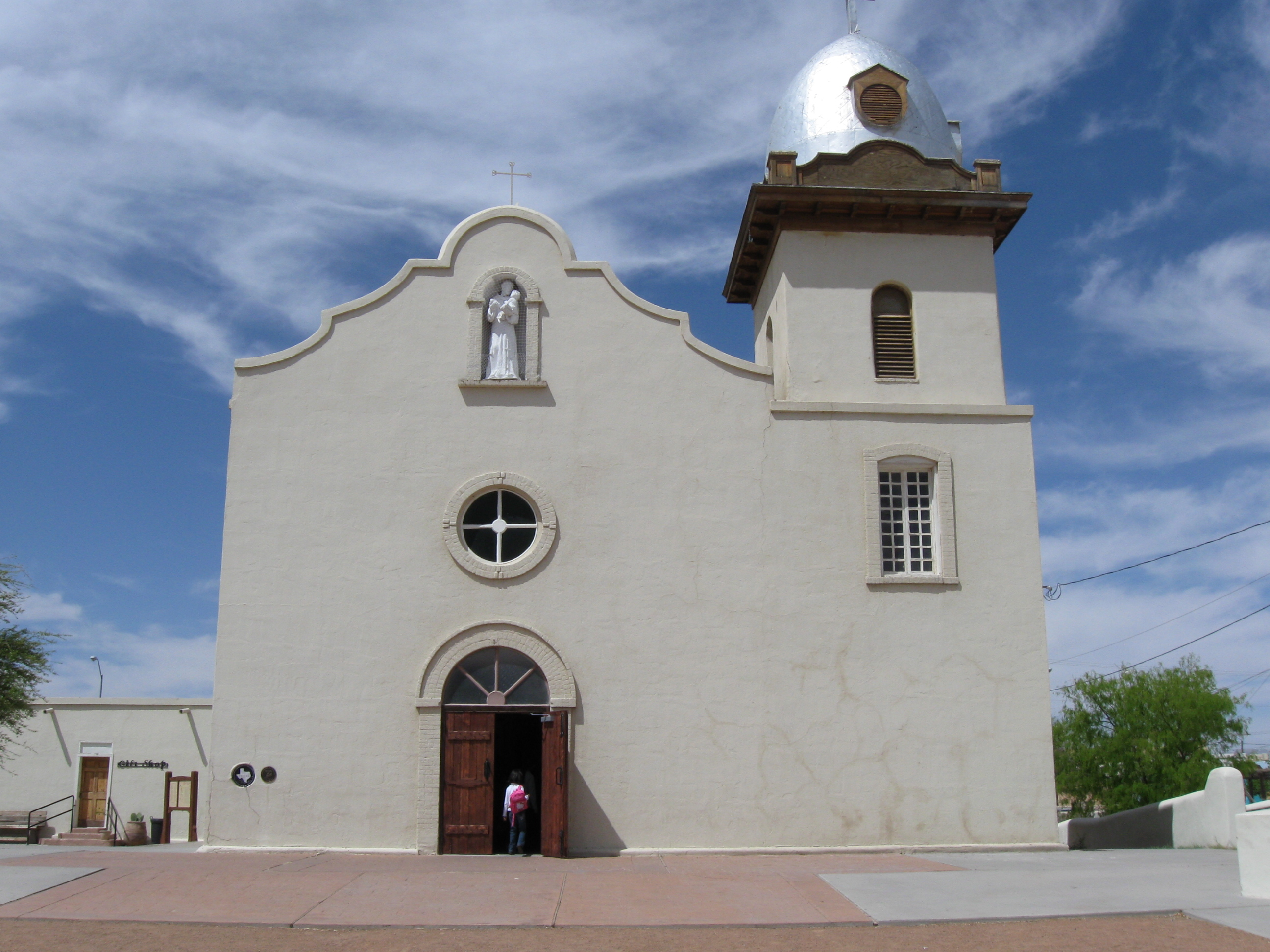
Ysleta mission church

The Lower Road ran from Franklin to Horse Head Crossing Station (used from August 1, 1859)

- Ysleta - Located 14 miles from Franklin.
- Socorro - Located 3 miles from Ysleta.

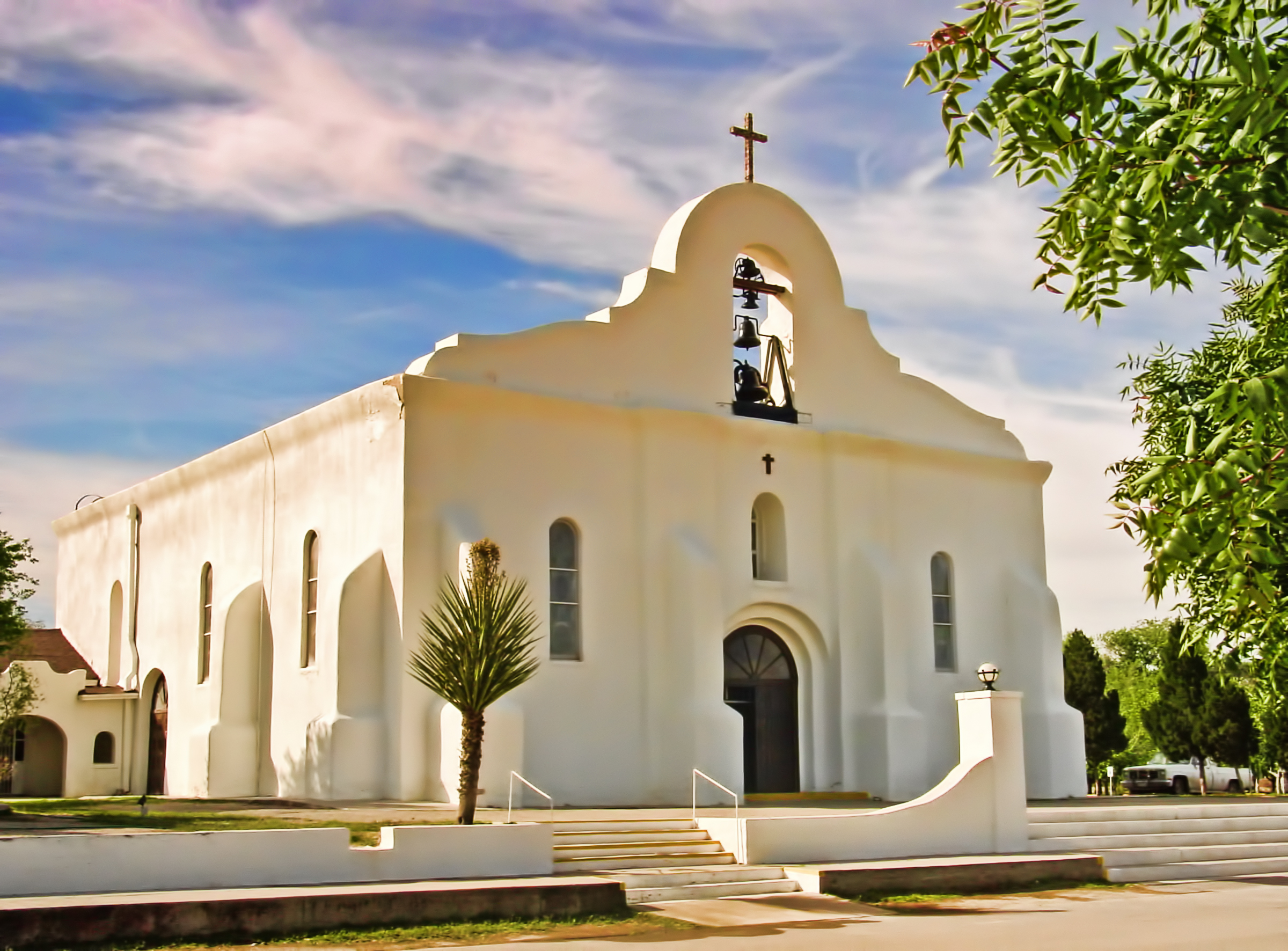
Presidio Chapel of San Elizario

- San Elizario - Located 9 1/4 miles from Socorro.
- Camp Hawkins Station - Located 10 1/2 miles from San Elizario.
- Birchville or Smith's Ranch Station - Located 24 1/2 miles from San Elizario.
- Camp Rice Station - Located 15 miles from Birchville Station.
- Fort Quitman - Located 33 miles from Birchville Station, 18 miles from Birchville Station.
- Camp Fargo Station - Located 5 1/2 miles from Fort Quitman.
- Quitman Pass
- Eagle Spring Station - Located 31 miles from Fort Quitman, 25.5 miles from Camp Fargo
- Van Horns Wells Station - Located 19 miles from Eagle Spring.
- Deadman's Hole Spring or El Muerto Spring - Located 33 miles from Van Horns Wells Station, northeast of Valentine, Texas.
- Barrel Springs Station - Located 18 miles southeast of Deadman's Hole.

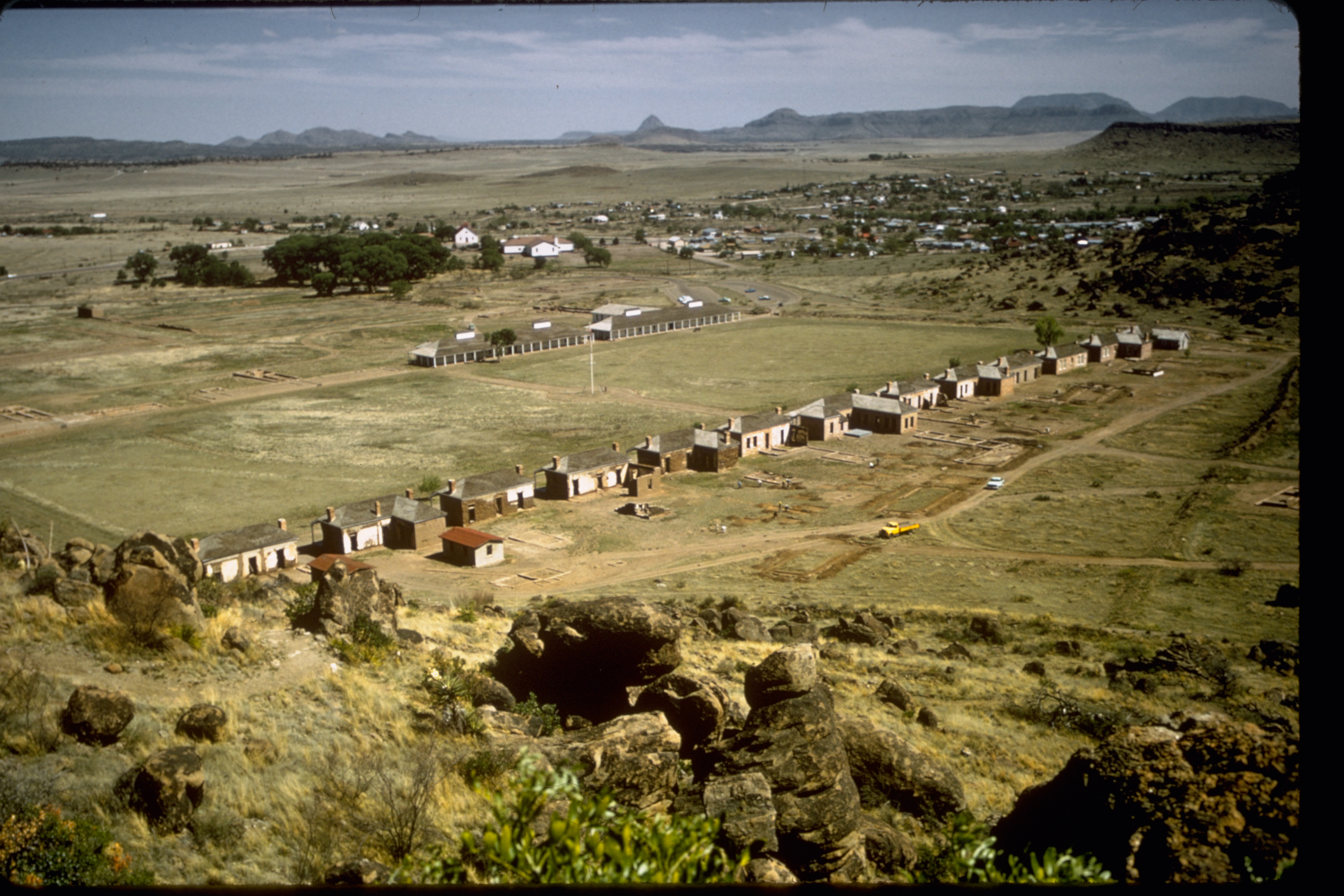
Fort Davis National Historic Site

- Point of Rocks - A spring located 8 miles southeast of Barrel Springs Station, 10 miles from Fort Davis.
- Fort Davis Station - Located near Fort Davis 18 miles from Barrel Springs.
- Limpia Station - Located 18 miles from Fort Davis in Limpia Canyon.
- Barilla Spring Station - Located 10 miles from Limpia Station.
  - Hackberry Holes Station - A later station, located 15 miles from Barilla Spring, 22 miles from Leon Springs.
- Leon Holes Station - Located 34 miles from Barela Springs.

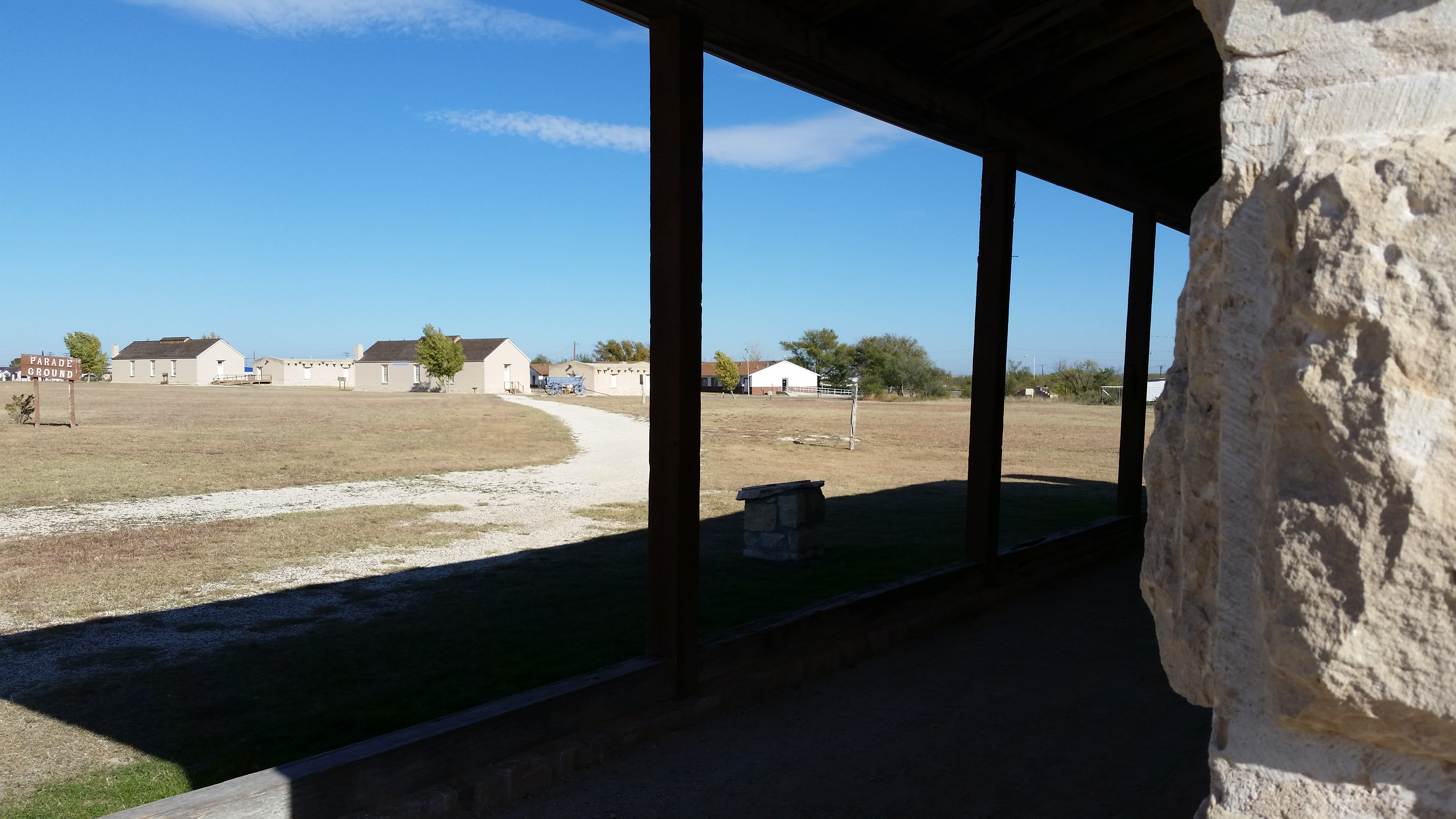
Grounds of frontier Fort Stockton

- Fort Stockton Station - Located 8 1/2 miles from Leon Springs, 45 miles from Horsehead Crossing Station
- Casa Blanca Spring - A spring 9 miles from Camp Stockton.
- Camp Pleasant Station - Located at Agua Bonita Spring 11 miles from Camp Stockton, 23 miles from Horsehead Crossing.

==== Main 5th Division Route ====
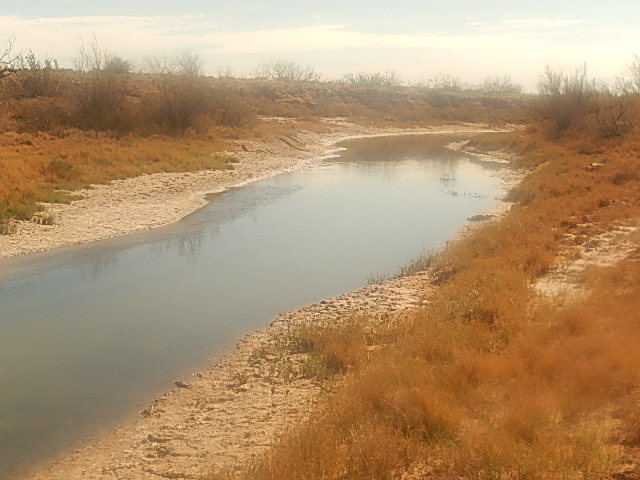
Horsehead Crossing along the Pecos River

- Horse Head Crossing Station - On the Pecos River, located 55 miles from Emigrant Crossing Station on the northern route and 45 miles from Camp Stockton on the Lower Road. A ferry was added to carry coaches across the Pecos River from August 1, 1859.
  - Castle Gap Station- Located 12 miles from Horse Head Crossing Station, 17 miles to Wild China Ponds.
- Wild China Ponds - Seasonal waterholes between Horsehead Crossing and Head of Concho, nearest Horse Head Crossing. 17 miles from Castle Gap Statiothe the n, 19 miles from Llano Estacado Station.
  - Llano Estacado Station - Later station, built in 1859, midway between Horse Head Crossing and Head of Concho. 48 miles from Horse Head Crossing, 36 miles from Castle Gap Station.
- Mustang Waterholes - Seasonal waterholes between Horsehead Crossing and Head of Concho, 12 – 14 miles from Head of Concho in Centralia Draw.
  - 12 miles from Head of Concho in Centralia Draw just east of the Mustang Waterholes.
- Head of Concho Station - Located 70 miles from Horsehead Crossing, no water on the route except at station.
- Johnson's Station/Camp Johnson - Located 20 miles west of current San Angelo, on Middle Concho River.

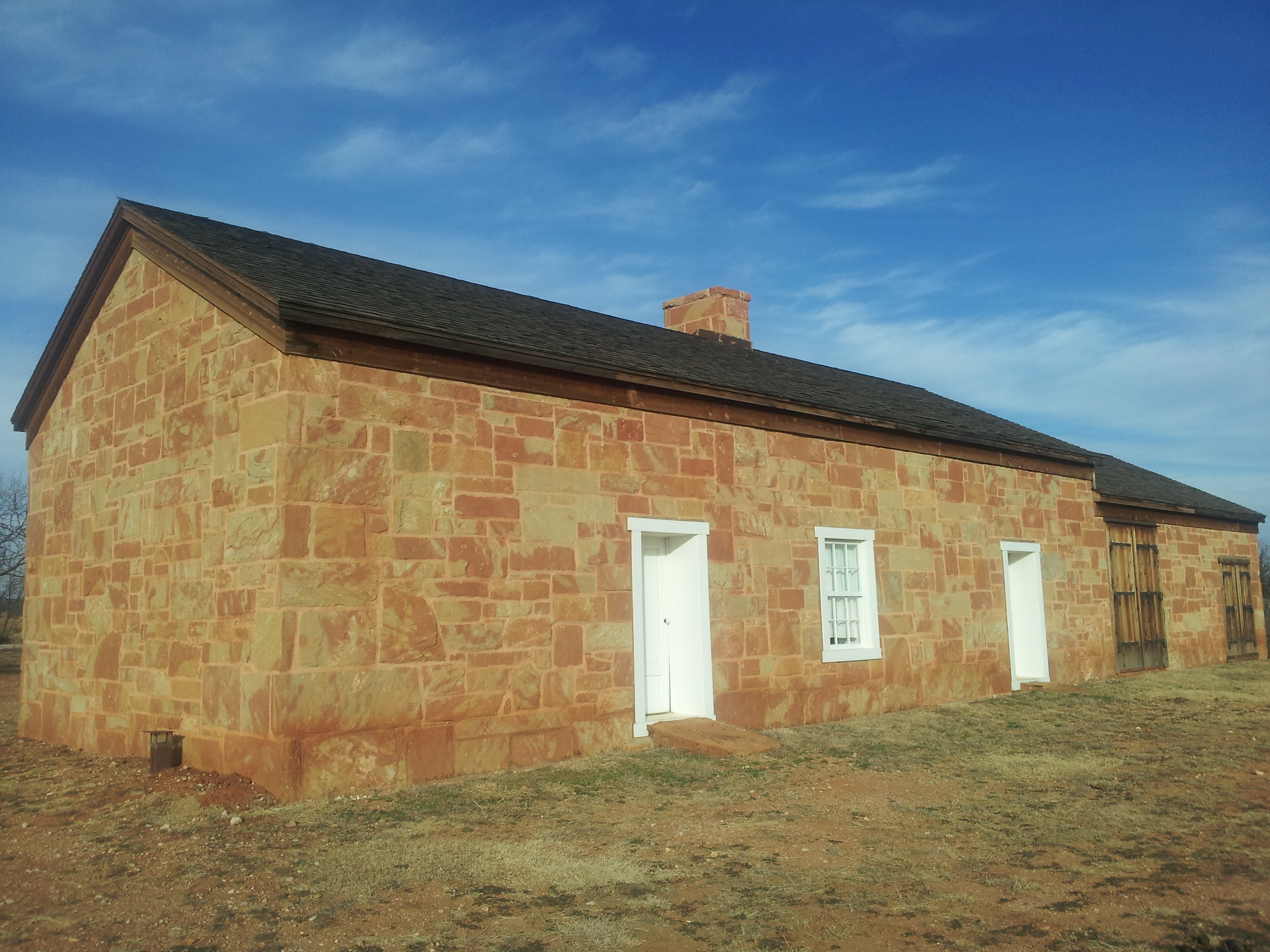
Fort Chadbourne stage station

- Grape Creek Station - Located 18 miles north of current San Angelo, along the East Fork of Grape Creek.
  - Colorado River Station - Later station between Grape Creek Station and Fort Chadbourne.
- Fort Chadbourne - Located 30 miles from Grape Creek Station.

=== 6th Division ===
- Valley Creek Station - Located 12 miles north east of Fort Chadbourne, on the east bank of Valley Creek, about 1 mile northwest of Shep.
- Mountain Pass Station - Located 16 miles from Valley Creek Station, about 11 miles due south of Merkel.

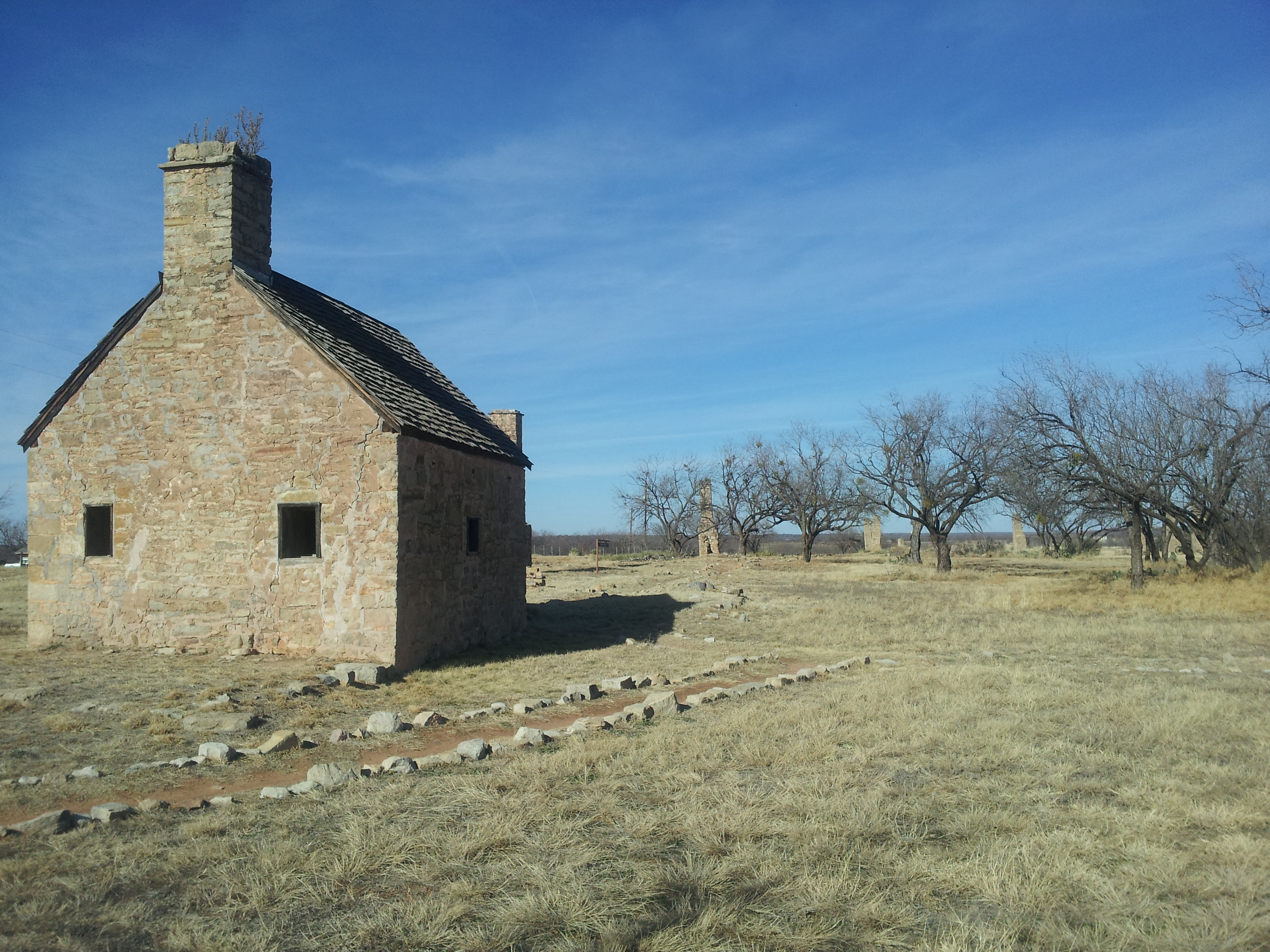
Guard House at Fort Phantom Hill

- Phantom Hill Station - Located 30 miles from Mountain Pass Station, about 10 miles north of present-day Abilene.
- Smith's Station - Located 12 miles from Phantom Hill Station, on the east bank of Chimney Creek.
- Clear Fork Station - Located 26 miles from Smith's Station, on the east bank of the Clear Fork of the Brazos River, a short distance above its confluence with Lambshead Creek, north of the later site of Fort Griffin.
- Frans's Station - Located 13 miles from Clear Fork Station, about 3 miles north of Murray.
  - Krebs's Station - a later relay station 11 miles from Frans's Station and 11 miles from Belknap Station.

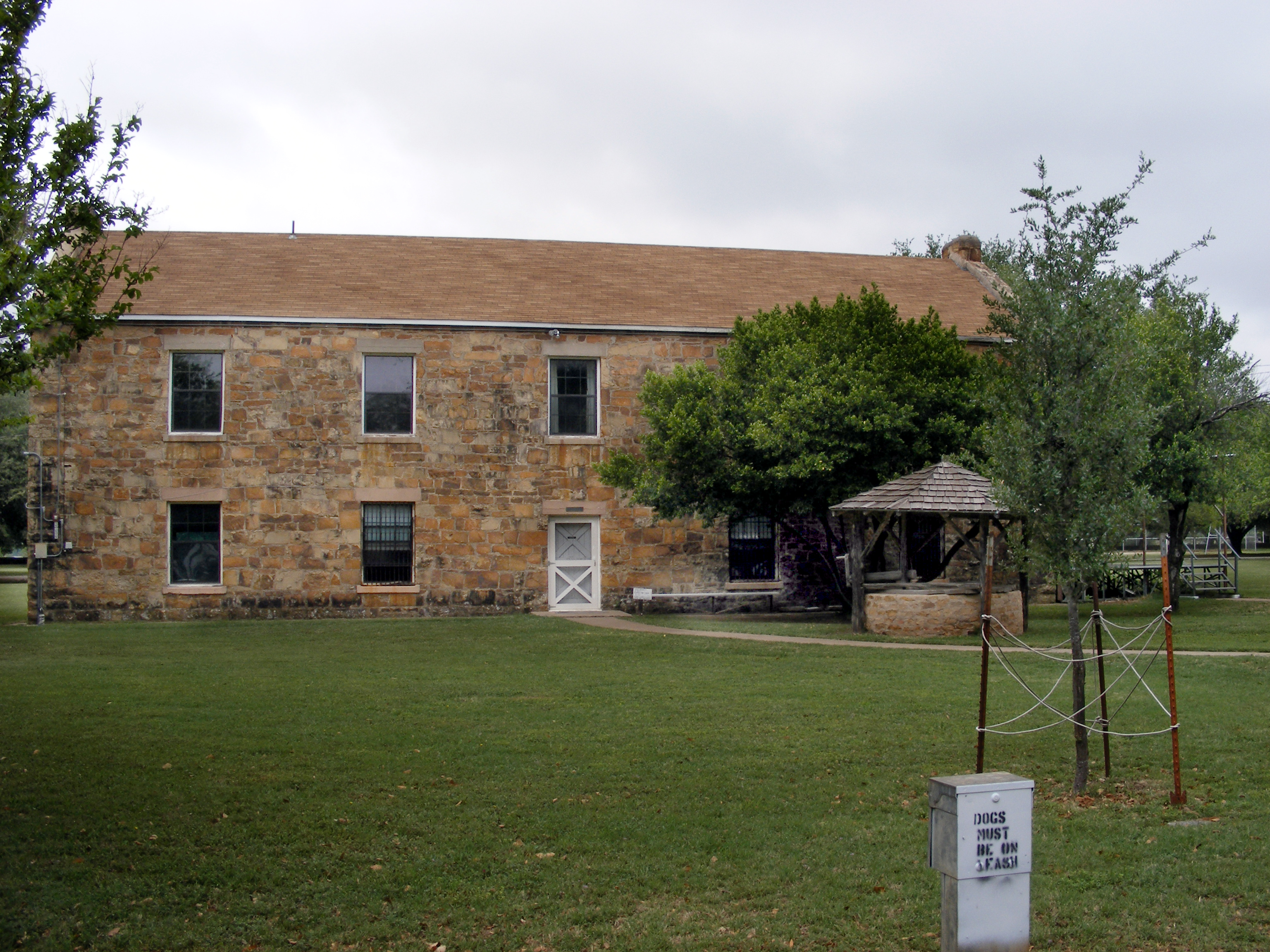
Museum at Fort Belknap

- Fort Belknap Station - Located 22 miles from Frans's Station, 11 miles from Krebs's Station.
- Murphey's Station - Located 16 miles from Fort Belknap, about 4 1/2 miles south of Loving.
  - Fishpond Station - A later station 17 miles from Murphey's Station and 5 miles from Jacksboro.
- Jacksboro Station - Located 22 miles from Murphey's Station.
- West Fork of the Trinity Station - Located 12 miles from Jacksboro Station, at a ford on the east bank of the river.
- Earhart's Station - Located 16 miles from Jacksboro Station, west of Cundiff, Texas on the west bank of Big Creek to 1860.
- Conolly's Station - Located 16 miles from Earhart's Station, 4 miles northwest of Alvord, Texas to 1860.
- Davidsen's Station - Located 24 miles from Conolly's Station, 4 miles west of Era, Texas to 1860.
- Gainesville Station - Located 17 miles from Davidsen's Station to March 1861.
- Diamond's Station - Located 15 miles from Gainesville Station to March 1861.
- Sherman Station - Located 15 miles from Diamond's Station.
- Colbert's Ferry - Located 13 1/2 miles from Sherman Station, ferry crossing of the Red River to Indian Territory.

==== 6th Division alternate route ====
The 6th Division alternate route was between Jacksboro and Gainesville Stations August 1860 - March 1861

- Wizard Wells - a stage stand, located 11 miles from Jacksboro Station.
- West Fork - a settlement and toll bridge on the West Fork Trinity River located 13 miles from Wizard Wells, 24 miles from Jacksboro, 2 miles SW of Bridgeport.
- Decatur Station - a station, in Decatur, 12 miles from West Fork 40 miles from Gainesville.
- Denton Creek Station - station 10 miles from Decatur on Denton Creek, near Greenwood, Texas.
- Jones' Station - a station 19 miles from Decatur, on Clear Creek, near Leo, Cooke County, Texas.
- Wheelocks' Station - a station 10 miles from Jones' Station, at the head of Spring Creek, 11 miles from Gainesville.

== See also ==
- San Antonio-San Diego Mail Line
- Butterfield Overland Mail in California
  - Butterfield Overland Mail in Baja California
- Butterfield Overland Mail in New Mexico Territory
- Butterfield Overland Mail in Indian Territory
- Butterfield Overland Mail in Arkansas and Missouri
- Pony Express
