= Pope's Crossing =

Pope's Crossing was a ford on the Pecos River located one mile south of the New Mexico–Texas border on the modern Loving–Reeves county line. Discovered by members of an 1855 expedition tasked with drilling artesian wells east of the Pecos led by U.S. Army topographical engineer John Pope, the ford quickly became the primary crossing of the river on the "upper" military or emigrant road between San Antonio and the ford on the Rio Grande opposite the Mexican town of El Paso del Norte. Heavily used by emigrants, soldiers, traders, and freighters eager to avoid the more difficult and unpredictable crossings further south, Pope's Crossing became a well-traveled part of the network of transcontinental wagon roads that developed across Texas in the 1850s to facilitate settlement and commerce in the southwestern lands recently acquired as a result of the Mexican–American War.

The ford on the Pecos chosen by the Butterfield Overland Mail line and, later, by the Goodnight–Loving cattle trail, Pope's Crossing would also play a significant role in the development of transportation, communication, and economic infrastructure in the Trans-Pecos region of Texas. Rendered impractical by the coming of the railroads in 1880, the crossing, and the associated camp Pope established nearby, would be inundated by the waters of Red Bluff Reservoir, created when the Pecos was impounded by the construction of the Red Bluff Dam in 1936.

== History ==
In the early 1850s the United States Congress, eager to secure permanent links with the 525,000 square miles of southwestern territory acquired by the United States as a result of the Mexican–American War, dispatched a number of expeditions into these lands to survey possible routes for a transcontinental rail line from the Mississippi river to the Pacific coast. The expedition tasked with surveying a southern route across Texas from the Rio Grande to the Red River was entrusted to Brevet Captain John Pope, an Army topographical engineer in the Department of New Mexico. Assembling a group of approximately 75 officers, scientific specialists, teamsters and escort troops at Mesilla, a town on the Rio Grande near modern Las Cruces, New Mexico, Pope began to move east in February 1853. Traveling past the Guadalupe Mountains, Pope crossed the Pecos River near the modern Texas-New Mexico border and continued east across the Llano Estacado and the Cross Timbers, reaching the Red River near Preston on May 16.

Pope's report, submitted to Congress in late 1854, lauded the proposed southern route, describing it as "a route for emigration or for military purposes ... from the frontiers of Arkansas to the valley of the Rio Grande, which, for more than half the entire distance, traverses a region fertile, well watered, well timbered, and of mild climate." The only major problem with constructing a railroad along the route, the report conceded, was the area between the Pecos River and the headwaters of the Colorado River, a difficult part of the Llano Estacado that contained very little water or wood. A possible solution, Pope argued, was to drill a series of artesian wells east of the Pecos to provide permanent supplies of water for emigrants and railroads, his report concluding that "the peculiarly favorable character of the ground along the route of the 32d parallel, the directness of this route over it, and the difficulties [of potential routes] to the north and south, would seem to present inducements eminently favorable to the construction of these wells."

Congress agreed, and in 1855 Pope was ordered to return to the Pecos for the purpose of seeking underground sources of water, the first Anglo attempt to drill for resources in the Trans-Pecos region. Leaving the port of Indianola, on the Texas gulf coast, Pope traveled to the Pecos, establishing a camp on the eastern bank of the river approximately 4 miles south of the modern Texas–New Mexico border. Near the end of the almost three year attempt to find water, one of the many small parties of exploration dispatched by Pope to map the local area and catalog local flora and fauna discovered a previously unknown ford across the Pecos north of Pope's camp. Seemingly undiscovered by any of the several expeditions that had previously crossed the area, or by emigrant trains, or even by Pope himself, who had crossed the Pecos further north at the confluence with Delaware Creek during his expedition of 1854, the unnamed ford was noted on a June 1858 map prepared by Pope as being "three miles north-northwest of his 'Main Camp,' and one mile south of the New Mexico line."

Located on a portion of the river with broader, shallower approaches than the traditional crossing point at Horsehead Crossing further south (between modern Crane and McCamey), the ford that would eventually bear Pope's name quickly gained popularity among the emigrants, gold-seekers, traders, and freighters who traveled the "upper" road between San Antonio and the crossing of the Rio Grande opposite the Mexican town of El Paso del Norte (modern day El Paso, Texas). Eager to avoid the difficult and unpredictable crossing further south, traffic increasingly bypassed the ford at Horsehead Crossing, continuing north along the eastern side of the river before crossing the river at Pope's ford and emerging on the western bank near the established road that ran south of the Guadalupe Mountains to the Rio Grande. In addition to providing a new link in the growing network of transcontinental roads, the discovery of the new crossing also supported the development of private transportation systems, like stagecoach lines, and public services, such as the mail. The Butterfield Overland Mail, an ambitious attempt to offer regular passenger and mail stagecoach service between San Francisco, California and St. Louis, Missouri, a distance of 2,795 miles, used Pope's Crossing to ford the Pecos, and Pope's Camp, the nearby depot used during the 1855 drilling expedition, as a line station, before turning northeast towards the Red River. This would continue for eleven months, until August 1859, when company officials moved the official route south to take advantage of the protection offered by Forts Davis and Stockton. Though short-lived, the mail route would help establish Pope's Crossing as not only a major component of the road from San Antonio, but also a part of the increasingly popular trail across north Texas to the Red River and the population centers beyond.

Pope's Crossing would also play an important role in the development of the cattle trails used to transport cattle from Texas to markets outside the state. Responding to a desperate need for beef in New Mexico, where the requirements of settlers and soldiers had been exponentially compounded by the needs of thousands of Native Americans recently moved onto ill-prepared and ill-supplied reservations, two cattlemen from north Texas, Charles Goodnight and Oliver Loving, undertook to drive 2,000 head of cattle from Fort Belknap (near modern Newcastle, Texas) to Fort Sumner, a military post on the Pecos river west of modern Clovis. Beginning the approximately 700-mile journey in June 1866, the drive initially following the route established by the Butterfield Overland Mail between north Texas and the Horsehead Crossing of the Pecos. Avoiding the difficult crossing, Goodnight and Loving instead turned north and drove their herd up the eastern bank of the river, fording the river at Pope's Crossing. Though this required them to re-cross the river later on, the use of Pope's Crossing allowed the drive to avoid the eastern bank of the river from the state line to north of Carlsbad, which was largely composed of sandhills, unsuitable for use as a trail. Successfully arriving at Fort Sumner, Goodnight and Loving established a route that would, despite Loving's death the next year on a subsequent drive, lead to the driving of thousands of heads of cattle across Pope's ford along a trail that eventually stretched into Colorado and Wyoming.

== Inundation ==
Though located and popularized as part of a larger effort to forge permanent rail links through the region, the importance of Pope's Crossing steadily declined after the arrival of the Texas and Pacific Railroad in 1880. The consistent, all-weather capabilities of rail began to render the long, slow, hot, wagon road, and its crossing, increasingly irrelevant. The arrival of the railroad also led to a gradual increase in the population of the region, who, having chosen to settle in the region, began to see the Pecos less as a barrier to be overcome, and more as a valuable resource to be managed, the waters of the river recognized as a prerequisite to permanent settlement and a vital element in any attempt to create an agricultural region along the valley of the river.

By the turn of the century counties on both sides of the Texas–New Mexico border had begun to examine different methods by which the waters of the Pecos could be used to support both the needs of a growing population and the requirements of large-scale agriculture. One plan eventually adopted was the impoundment of the Pecos below the Texas–New Mexico state line and the creation of a reservoir to provide municipal water supplies to settlers in Reeves and Loving counties. First envisioned in 1916, when the Pecos Valley of Texas Water Users Association enlisted the aid of the Department of the Interior in the planning and construction of a reservoir, the plan would eventually be approved by President Calvin Coolidge in 1926, after the completion of a compact between the states of Texas and New Mexico (later repealed by both states). Established in 1927, the controlling authority for the project, the Red Bluff Water Power Control District, began construction of the Red Bluff Dam, a 9,200 foot long earthen embankment, in November 1934, completing the project 22 months later, in September 1936. A very wet 1937 quickly filled the resulting reservoir with 151,110 acre-feet of water, flooding a surface area of 7,495 acres, including Pope's Crossing and Pope's Camp.

== Access ==
As previously noted, the exact location of Pope's Crossing, and the associated camp, was inundated in 1936 by the waters of Red Bluff Lake, a reservoir created by the impoundment of the Pecos by the Red Bluff Dam. A granite Texas Centennial historical marker, located at the intersection of U.S. 285 and County Route 453, in Reeves County, commemorates the history of the ford, which lies under water approximately 4.5 miles northeast.

== Sources ==
- Dearen, Patrick (2012). Crossing Rio Pecos. TCU Press. ISBN 978-0-87565-561-1. Project MUSE book 23778.
- Baird, Spencer Fullerton; Henry, Joseph (1855). Reports of explorations and surveys, to ascertain the most practicable and economical route for a railroad from the Mississippi River to the Pacific Ocean. Made under the direction of the secretary of war. doi:10.5962/bhl.title.11139. LCCN rc01001840. OCLC 1469530, 39314047, 679343164.
