= Birchville (disambiguation) =

Birchville usually refers to a suburb of Upper Hutt in New Zealand. However, there are several other places in the world that either are, or have previously been named Birchville. Consider these alternatives:

- Birchville, California is a former settlement in Nevada County, California.
- Birchville was the original name of Pinos Altos, New Mexico, after Robert H. Birch and two other prospectors discovered gold there in 1860.
- Birchville is an inactive village placename in Massachusetts.
- Birchville, Texas, now a ghost town, in Hudspeth County, Texas, was a settlement on the San Antonio-El Paso Road and later a stagecoach station on the Butterfield Overland Mail route.

== See also ==
- Birchville Cat Motel, a one-man musical experiment.
