= Pinery =

Pinery may refer to:

- Pinery Provincial Park in Ontario, Canada
- Pineapple pit, sometimes referred to as a pinery
- Pinery Station in Texas
- Pinery, South Australia, a locality between Mallala and Balaklava
