= Goodnight–Loving Trail =

Texas trail for cattle drives in 1860s

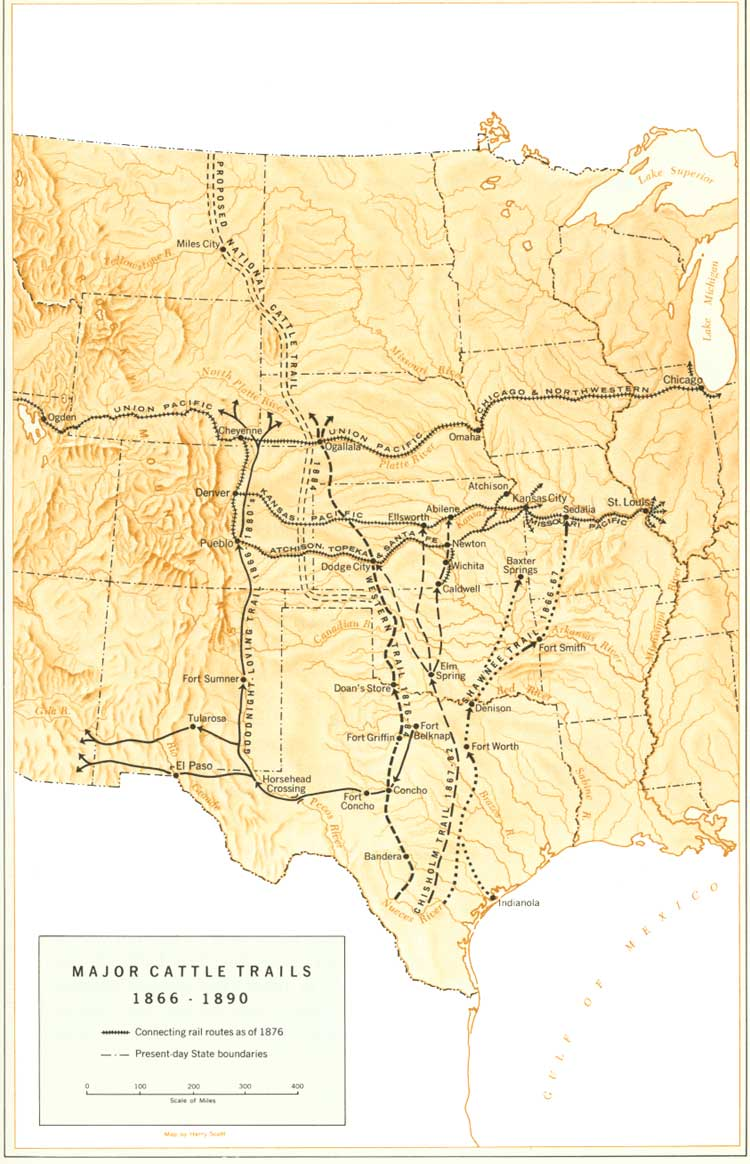
The Goodnight–Loving Trail is the westernmost on this Western cattle trail map.

The Goodnight–Loving Trail was a trail used in the cattle drives of the late 1860s for the large-scale movement of Texas Longhorns. It is named after cattlemen Charles Goodnight and Oliver Loving.

== Route ==
The Goodnight-Loving Trail began at Fort Belknap, Texas along part of the former route of the Butterfield Overland Mail, traveling through Central Texas across the Llano Estacado (Staked Plains) to Horsehead Crossing, north along the Pecos River and across Pope's Crossing, into Fort Sumner, New Mexico. The trail then continued north to Denver, Colorado, and was extended on into Wyoming.

== Goodnight and Loving's drive of 1866 ==
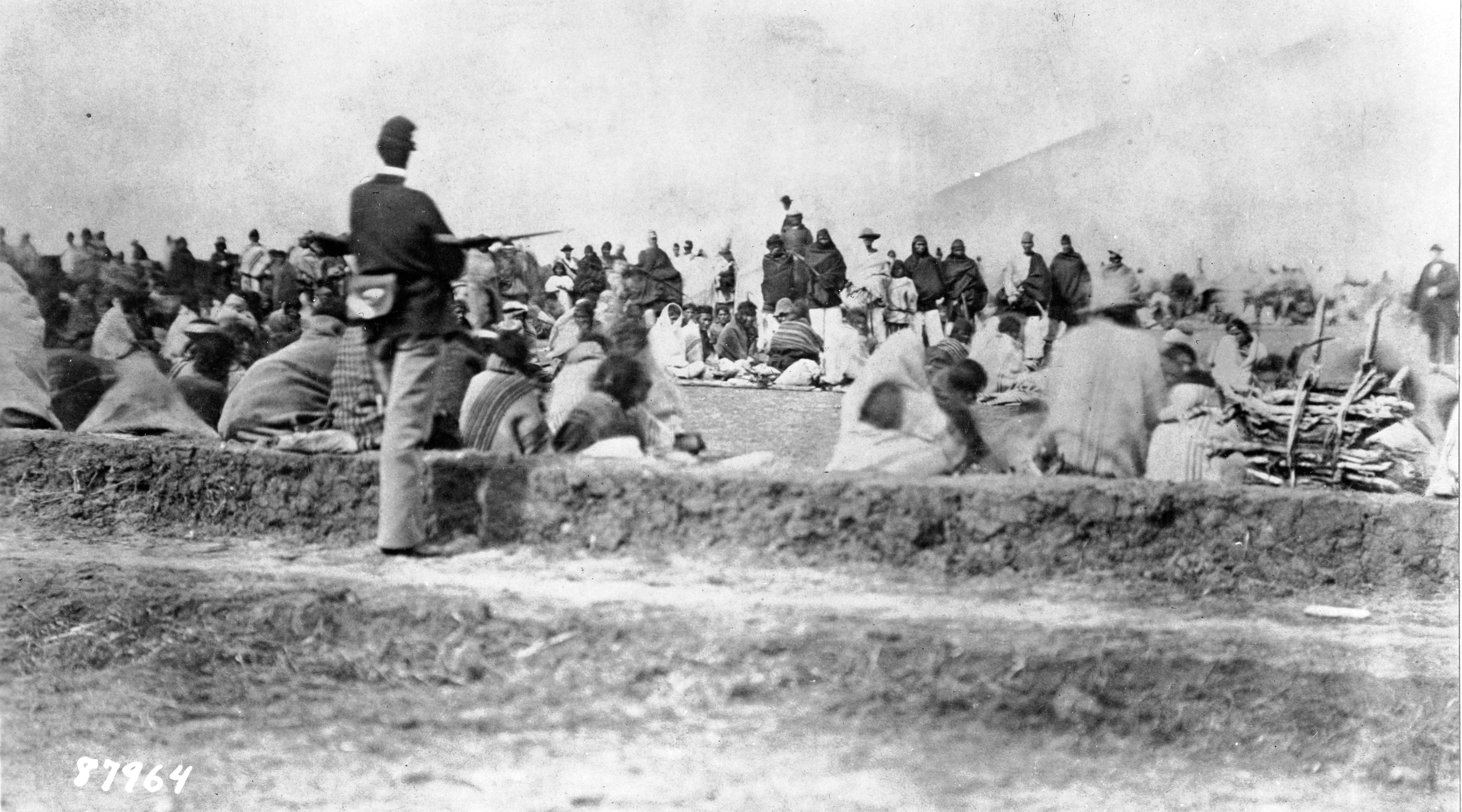
Navajo prisoners had to be fed by the U.S. government.

In June 1866, Charles Goodnight and Oliver Loving decided to partner to drive cattle to growing western markets. They hoped that demand for beef from settlers, soldiers stationed at military outposts across New Mexico, and Navajos recently placed on reservations near Fort Sumner would make the drive profitable. With 18 cowpunchers, they brought 2,000 head of cattle to Fort Sumner, New Mexico. Over 8,000 Navajo had been interned at the Bosque Redondo reservation under the control of the fort, but due to the poor conditions on the reservation for agriculture and inadequate planning by the US authorities for provisions, the demand for new food supplies became urgent. Goodnight and Loving received $0.08/pound for the steers in the herd, although they were unable to interest the government agent in 800 stocker cattle. Goodnight returned to Texas with about $12,000 in gold to buy more cattle.

Loving continued north towards the railhead in Denver, with the remaining cattle and calves. He was stopped by a tollgate chain in the Raton Pass, operated by Richens Lacey Wootton. Loving paid Wootton 10 cents per head of cattle. In Denver, Loving sold the herd to John Wesley Iliff.

== Later developments ==
During the Drive of 1867, at Horsehead Crossing, during a heavy storm, the herd was attacked by a party of Comanches, leaving it divided and scattered. Loving and "One Arm Bill" Wilson rode ahead towards Fort Sumner to advise them of the delay. They were ambushed by Comanches, and while both managed to escape, Loving died after refusing to have an amputation. Goodnight drove herds along the route over Raton Pass again in 1868, paying the toll. In February 1868, he began to drive slaughter herds to Cheyenne, Wyoming, to be butchered and both marketed locally and shipped by railroad to markets in Chicago.

In 1868, he also scouted a new route via the Trincheras Pass, to sell cattle to Iliff in Cheyenne. Iliff had become established as a leading commercial cattle rancher in his holdings along the Platte River, and sold beef to mining camps, railroad workers, and government agents working on Indian reservations. Over the next decade, cattle ranches stocked with Texas Longhorn brought up along the trail were established across Wyoming. Several Texas companies relocated or started subsidiaries in Wyoming and Montana. Cheyenne became a hub for the local cattle business, with its connection to the Union Pacific Railroad.

== Cultural references ==
- "Goodnight-Loving Trail" is a song by country artist Utah Phillips.
- "Goodnight-Loving" is a song by country artist Clint Black.
- The Flying J Wranglers is a country and western band in Alto, New Mexico (the Goodnight–Loving Trail passed near their Flying J Ranch).
- Centennial is a novel in which cattle are brought to Colorado by way of the Goodnight-Loving Trail, which was renamed the Skimmerhorn Trail in the novel.
  - A miniseries of the same name follows the same plot of the novel.
- The Mutual Radio Theater 1980 episode "Goodnight Loving Trail" tells the story of the initial attempt by Goodnight and Loving to form the trail.
- The Adventures of Goodnight and Loving (1986) is a novel by author Leslie Thomas in which the main protagonist, George Goodnight, is inspired by the adventures of his namesake Charles Goodnight and partner Oliver Loving.
- The Colter Wall song "The Last Loving Words" is billed as a "tip of the hat to Charles Goodnight and Oliver Loving who together created the Goodnight-Loving trail in the 1860's."
- The Goodnight Loving is a punk/garage band from Wisconsin.

== See also ==
- Bose Ikard
- Lonesome Dove series - fictionalized version of trail's history
