= Frank Crawford Armstrong =

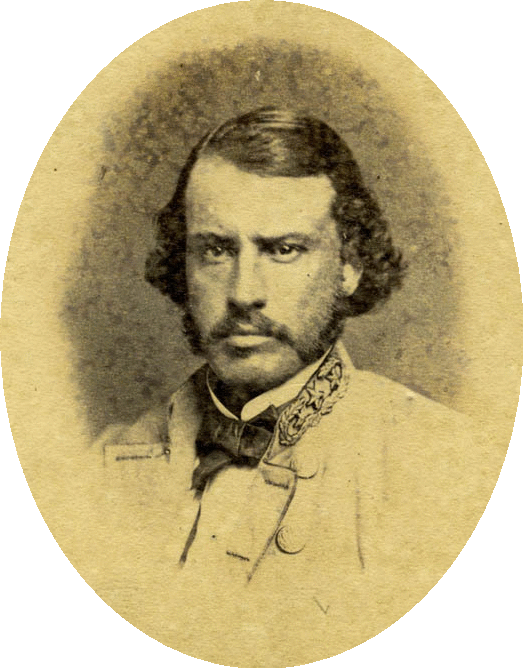
- Frank Crawford Armstrong, Brigadier General in the Confederate Army
- Born: November 22, 1835; Choctaw Agency, Indian Territory
- Died: September 8, 1909 (aged 73); Bar Harbor, Maine, U.S.
- Burial place: Rock Creek Cemetery; Washington, D.C., U.S.
- Relatives: Persifor Frazer Smith (Stepfather); Lucius Marshall Walker (Brother-in-law)
- Military career
- Allegiance: United States; Confederate States
- Branch: United States Army; Confederate States Army
- Service years: 1855–1861 (USA); 1861–1865 (CSA)
- Rank: Captain (USA); Brigadier General (CSA)
- Conflicts: Utah War; American Civil War

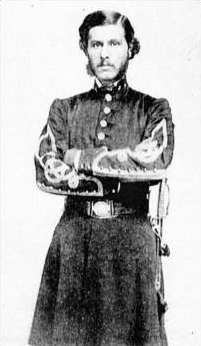
Frank Crawford Armstrong

Francis Crawford Armstrong (November 22, 1835 – September 8, 1909) was a United States Army cavalry officer and later a brigadier general in the Confederate States Army during the American Civil War. He is also known for being the only Confederate general to fight on both sides during the Civil War.

== Early life ==
Armstrong was born on November 22, 1835, in the Choctaw Agency in the Indian Territory, where his father, an army officer, had been stationed. His father, Francis Wells Armstrong, died three months before his son's birth. In 1854, Armstrong's mother married Mexican–American War general Persifor Smith. In 1854, Armstrong accompanied his stepfather on a U.S. army expedition into the New Mexico Territory. After he graduated from the College of the Holy Cross in Worcester, Massachusetts, Armstrong was commissioned as a lieutenant of the 2nd Dragoon Regiment in 1855 in recognition of his gallantry in a battle against Indians near Eagle Spring. Armstrong then campaigned with Albert Sidney Johnston against the Mormons during the Utah War.

== Civil War service ==
In June 1861, Armstrong was promoted to captain in the regular army. In July, he led a company of Union cavalry at the First Battle of Bull Run. However, Armstrong resigned his commission and on August 10, 1861, he joined the Confederate Army. As Armstrong's Union resignation did not go into effect until August 13, he was technically on both sides at the same time. He served as a staff officer under Confederate generals James M. McIntosh and Benjamin McCulloch before their deaths at the Battle of Pea Ridge, and was standing only feet away as McCulloch was killed.

In 1863 Armstrong was elected as colonel of the 3rd Louisiana Infantry Regiment, and was soon given command of the cavalry of Major General Sterling Price. Two months later, he was promoted to brigadier general and commanded a cavalry division under Nathan Bedford Forrest at the Battle of Chickamauga.

In February 1864, Armstrong requested a transfer to the command of Maj. Gen. Stephen D. Lee. He was assigned command of a brigade of Mississippi cavalry previously led by Colonel Peter B. Starke. Armstrong and his men accompanied Lt. Gen. Leonidas Polk's corps to Georgia and served in the Atlanta campaign, before participating in Lt. Gen. John B. Hood's disastrous campaign. He saw action during the campaign against Murfreesboro, and led much of Forrest's rear guard after the Hood's defeat at the Battle of Nashville.

On March 23, Armstrong was assigned to the defenses of Selma, Alabama, one of the Confederacy's last remaining industrial centers. On April 2, 1865, his troops participated in efforts to defend the town against a much larger Union force under Maj. Gen. James H. Wilson. Armstrong was captured later that day.

== Post-war years ==
With the return of peace Armstrong worked for the Overland Mail Service in Texas. Because of his frontier and military experience, he served as United States Indian Inspector from 1885 until 1889, and was the Assistant Commissioner of Indian Affairs from 1893 to 1895.

Armstrong died in Bar Harbor, Maine in 1909, and was buried in Rock Creek Cemetery in Washington, D.C. He married Maria Polk Walker, daughter of Col. Joseph Knox Walker. Col. Walker is the brother of Lucius Marshall Walker, who also served as a Confederate general.

== See also ==
- List of American Civil War generals (Confederate)
- Joseph G. Sanders - A Confederate captain from Alabama who switched sides in 1864 and finished the war as a lieutenant in the Federal Army.
- Alfred Thomas Archimedes Torbert - A Union Army Officer who declined a CS Officers Commission in 1861
- Trooper Armstrong, grandfather
