= Eagle Spring =

Spring in Sandoval County, New Mexico

- Interactive map of Eagle Spring
- Location: Sandoval County, New Mexico, U.S.
- Coordinates: 35°55′26″N 107°15′40″W

Eagle Spring is a natural spring located in Sandoval County, New Mexico, situated on the Ojo Encino Mesa in the northwestern region of the state. It is located within the 87013 ZIP Code area near the border of the Navajo Nation.

== Geography and geology ==
Eagle Spring lies on the Ojo Encino Mesa, a high-desert mesa along the eastern rim of the San Juan Basin. The surrounding area is characterized by sandstone terrain and arid desert shrubland. Geologically, the area near Eagle Spring is known for deposits of volcanic perlite and elevated silica concentrations in the localized water table.

== History ==
In 1854–1855, during United States Army expeditions into the New Mexico Territory following the Mexican–American War, the area around Eagle Spring was the site of a military engagement between U.S. troops and local Native American forces.

During an expedition commanded by General Persifor Frazer Smith, his stepson Frank Crawford Armstrong served as a volunteer civilian aide. Following a skirmish near Eagle Spring, Armstrong received recognition for gallantry in combat. In 1855, in recognition of his actions at the spring, Armstrong was awarded a direct military commission as a second lieutenant in the 2nd Dragoon Regiment, launching a military career that later saw him serve as a brigadier general in the Confederate States Army.
