= Horsehead Crossing =

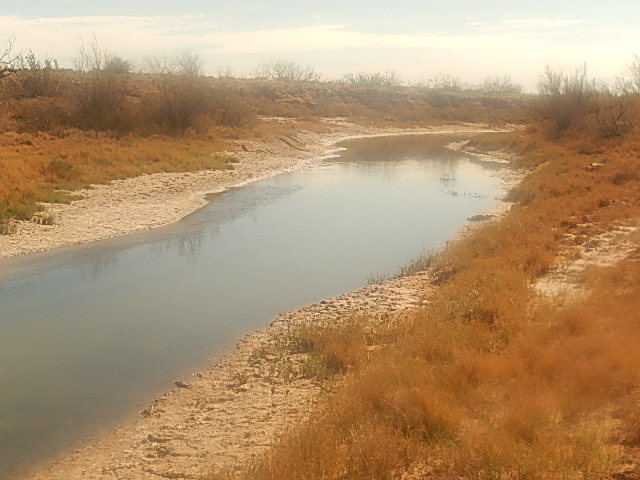
- Horsehead Crossing as it appears in 2014

- Location within Texas
- 31.235556°N 102.483889°W
- Type: Ford
- Location: Pecos County, Texas
- Nearest city: Girvin, Texas

Site notes
- Elevation: 2,316 feet (706 m)
- Governing body: State of Texas

Horsehead Crossing is a ford on the Pecos River in Crane County, south of Odessa, Texas. Historically, it was a major landmark on the trail west as one of a few fordable sections of the Pecos in West Texas, and as the first reliable source of water for about 75 miles on the route from the east.

The location as marked by a state historical marker is 31°14' N, 102°29' W, though debate exists as to possible alternate locations in that area. U.S. Geological Survey locates it at 31°14′08″N 102°29′02″W.

== History ==
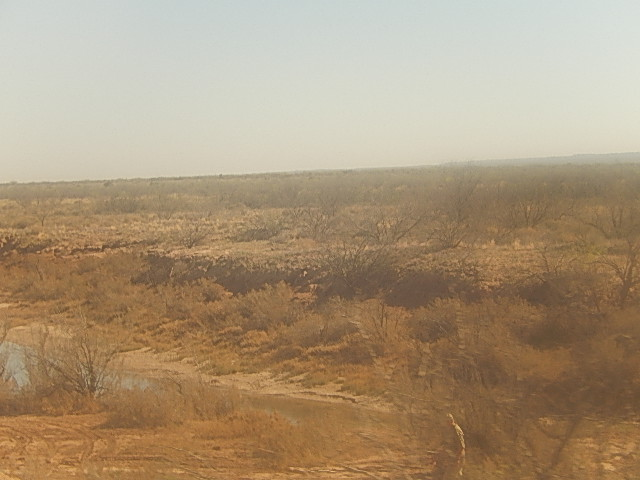
Brush landscape near Horsehead Crossing

Horsehead Crossing was the primary crossing of the Pecos River by the Comanche Trail from the Llano Estacado south to Mexico. Most used by the Comanche to raid in Mexico from the 1830s until the 1850s, it was probably a prehistoric crossing by earlier Native Americans.

The ford was mapped in 1849 by Randolph B. Marcy, commander of an army escort for parties on their way to California on the San Antonio-El Paso Road. In 1858, the crossing became an important stop on the Butterfield Overland Mail route from St. Louis to San Francisco. In 1866, Charles Goodnight and Oliver Loving blazed their famous cattle trail, which came to this point and turned upriver.

Decline of cattle drives and completion of two railroads across West Texas in the early 1880s led to the abandonment of the crossing.

The source of the name "Horsehead" has been attributed to horse skulls said to have marked the banks. This may have been due to Comanches, who marked the crossing for easier identification, or the abundance of animals that died at the crossing from drowning, quicksand, or over-drinking while being driven along the Comanche Trail returning from Mexico.

== See also ==
- Trans-Pecos
- Grandfalls, Texas
- Lobo, Texas
- List of rivers of Texas
