= Charles Goodnight =

American rancher (1836–1929)

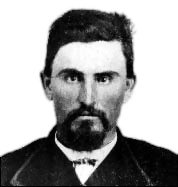
- Goodnight in 1860
- Born: March 5, 1836; Macoupin County, Illinois, U.S.
- Died: December 12, 1929 (aged 93); Tucson, Arizona, U.S.
- Resting place: Goodnight Cemetery near Amarillo, Texas
- Occupation: Rancher
- Spouse(s): Mary Ann Dyer Goodnight (m. 1870; d. 1926); Corinne Goodnight Goodnight (m. 1927; d. 1971)

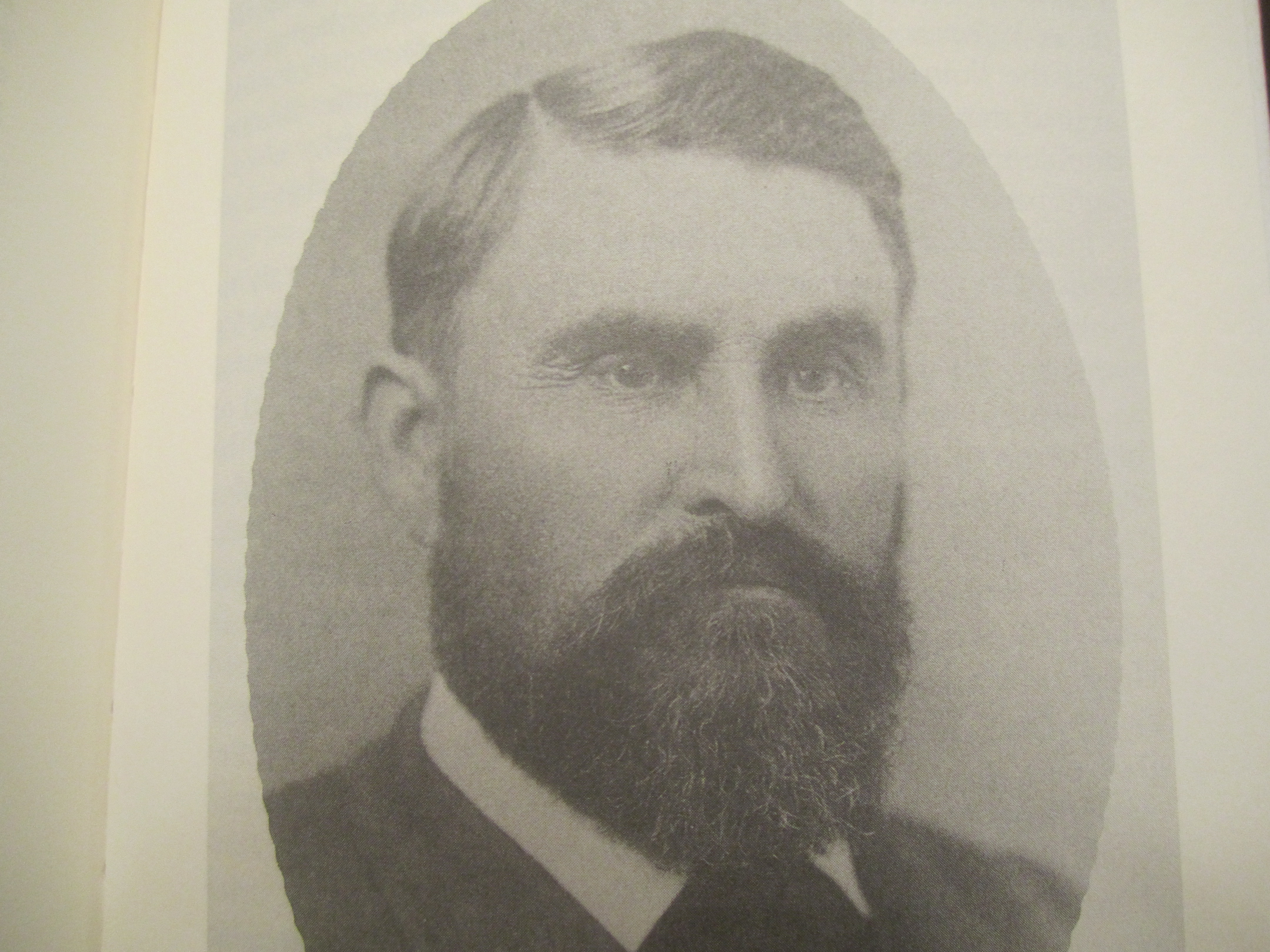
Goodnight (ca. 1880)

Charles Goodnight (March 5, 1836 – December 12, 1929), also known as Charlie Goodnight, was a rancher in the American West. In 1955, he was inducted into the Hall of Great Westerners of the National Cowboy & Western Heritage Museum.

== Early years ==
Goodnight was born in Macoupin County, Illinois, northeast of St. Louis, the fourth child of Charles Goodnight and the former Charlotte Collier. Goodnight's father's grave is located in a pasture south of Bunker Hill, Illinois. Goodnight was descended from immigrant pioneer Hans Michael Gutknecht, from Mannheim, Germany, making him a distant relative of Harry S. Truman.

Goodnight moved to Texas in 1846 with his mother and stepfather, Hiram Daugherty. In 1856, he became a cowboy and served with the local militia, fighting against the Comanche. A year later, in 1857, Goodnight joined the Texas Rangers. Goodnight is also known for raising and leading a posse against the Comanche in 1860 that located the Indian supply camp where Cynthia Ann Parker was working with her husband, Peta Nocona, then guiding Texas Rangers to the camp, leading to Cynthia Ann's recapture. In 1864, after serving in the Frontier Regiment during the American Civil War, Goodnight returned to Palo Pinto County, Texas.

Goodnight described what it took to become a scout, "First, he must be born a natural woodsman and have the faculty of never needing a compass except in snow storms or darkness."

== Cattle ==
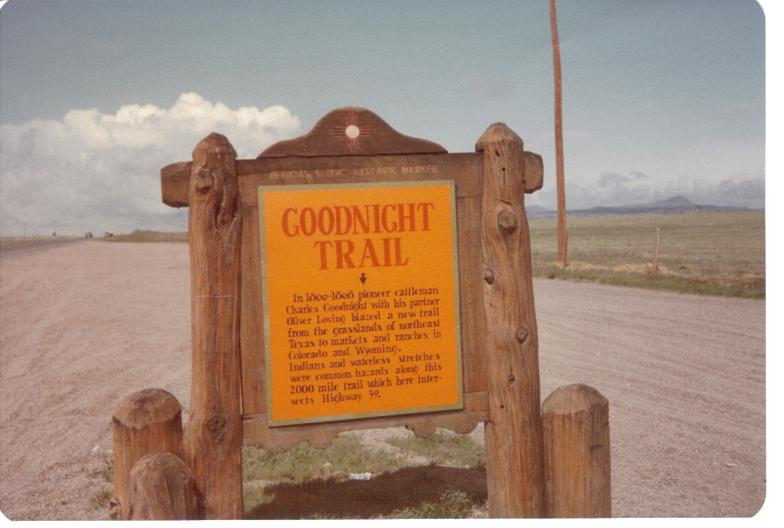
The 2,000-mile Goodnight-Loving Trail extended from the Texas Panhandle and into Colorado as it headed north into Wyoming.

In 1866, Oliver Loving and he drove their first herd of cattle from Fort Belknap (Texas) to Fort Sumner, along what would become known as the Goodnight-Loving Trail. The trail crossed 90 miles of the southern portion of the Llano Estacado, before crossing the Pecos River at Horsehead Crossing. In 1868, Goodnight established Rock Canon Ranch, west of Pueblo, Colorado.

Goodnight invented the chuckwagon, during this initial cattle drive. They extended the trail into Colorado, where they established a contract with John Wesley Iliff, eventually providing 30,000 head of longhorn by 1876. They also formed a partnership with John Chisum, supplying cattle to Fort Sumner in the New Mexico Territory.

To take advantage of available grass, timber, water, and game, Goodnight founded in 1876 what was to become the first Texas Panhandle ranch, the JA Ranch, in the Palo Duro Canyon. By 1885, the ranch covered 1,325,000 acres and held 100,000 head of cattle.

== Bison ==
In addition to raising cattle, in 1876 the Goodnights preserved a herd of native plains bison that year, which is said to survive to this day in Caprock Canyons State Park. The herd in Caprock Canyons was actually donated in name by JA Ranch, which Goodnight managed for years. Bison of this herd were introduced into the Yellowstone National Park in 1902 and into the larger zoos and ranches throughout the nation. He also crossbred the bison with domestic cattle, which he called cattalo.

== Personal life ==
On July 26, 1870, Goodnight married Mary Ann "Molly" Dyer, a teacher from Weatherford, west of Fort Worth. He developed a practical sidesaddle for Molly. Following Molly's death in 1926, he was contacted by Corinne Goodnight (who shared the same surname, although unrelated). She traveled from Montana to meet him, and they wed on his 91st birthday. He later joined her Two by Twos church and was baptized a few months before his death in Goodnight, Texas. Corinne died in 1971 (Marquette, Michigan)

One of his great-great-great nephews was professional bull rider Brent Thurman.

== Goodnight Ranch House restoration ==
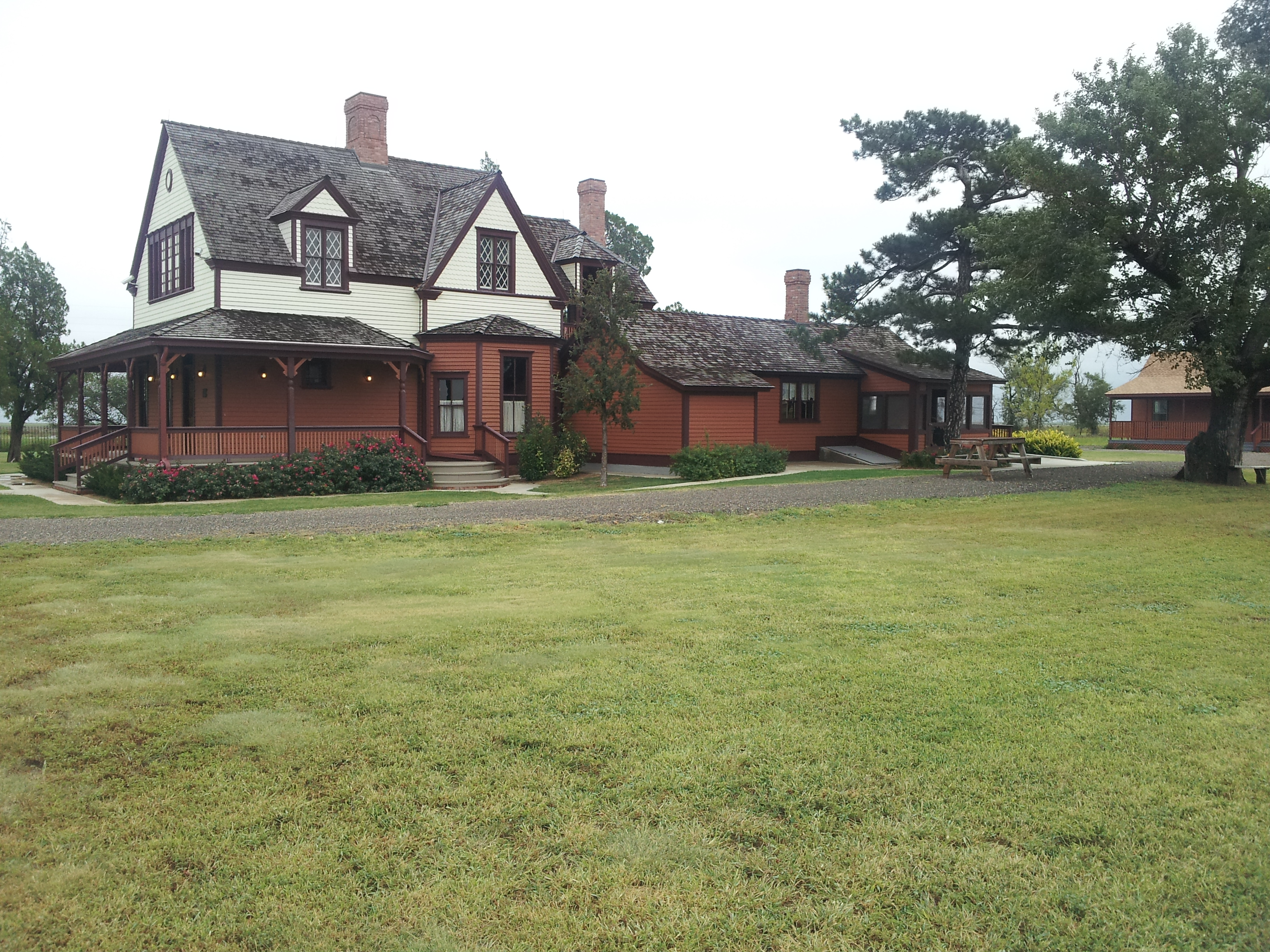
Charles Goodnight ranch house

The Charles and Mary Ann (Molly) Goodnight Ranch House is listed on the National Register of Historic Places. The Goodnight home is located one-quarter mile (400 m) south of U.S. Highway 287 about 40 miles (60 km) east of Amarillo. The home was renovated by the Armstrong County Museum from 2006 to 2012. The structure was painted to resemble its appearance in 1887. The interior was restored based on research into the original paint and wallpapers used. In 2005, Amarillo businessman Brent Caviness and a partner donated the home and 30 acres (12 ha). Mary Ann Goodnight taught children in the bunkhouse. The cowboys slept there at night, and she moved their things aside for school during the day, Goodin said.

The house was scheduled to open in April 2013.

== Reputation ==
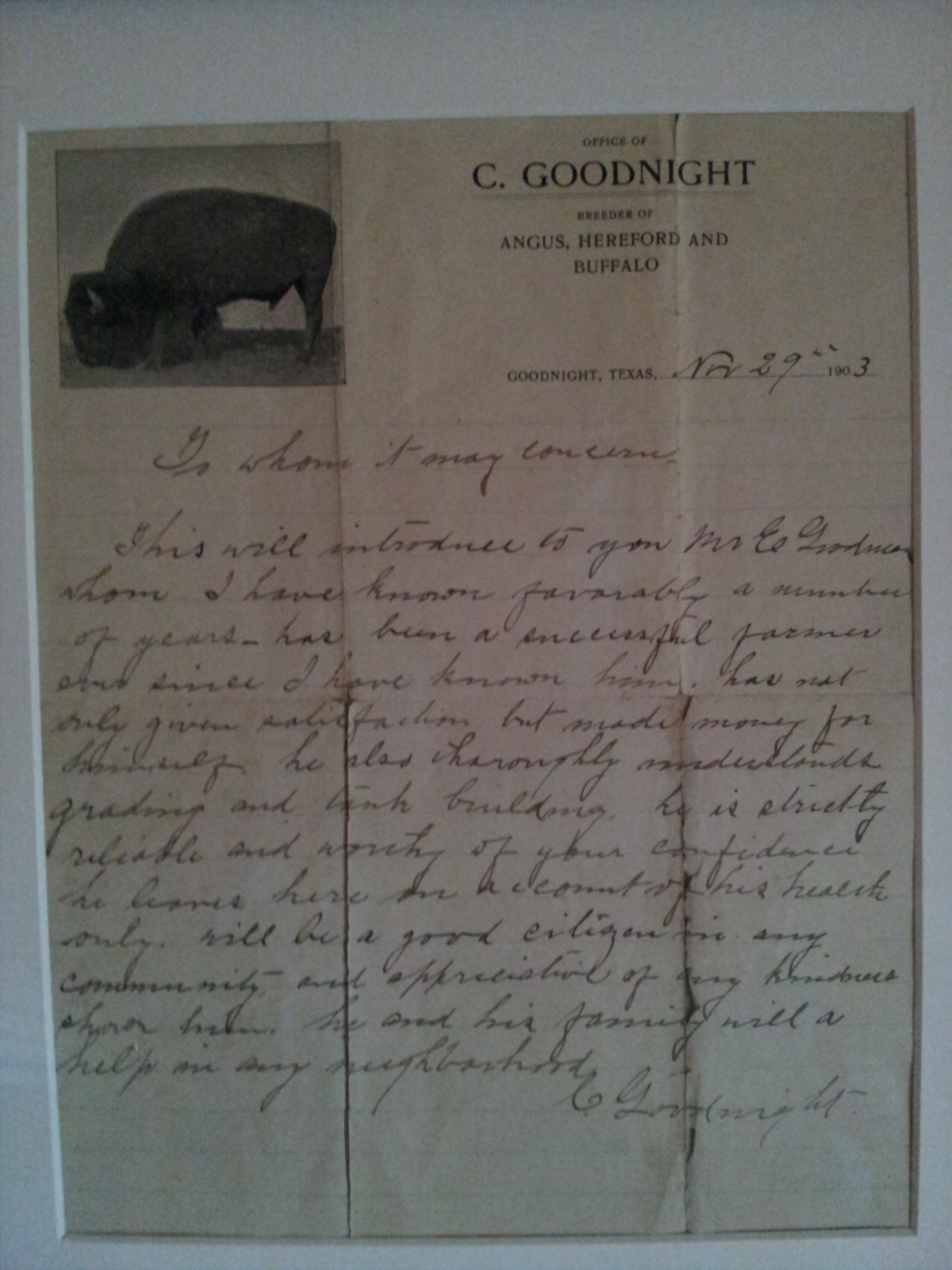
Charles Goodnight letter on his stationery

J. Frank Dobie, who knew Goodnight, is quoted in Charles Goodnight: Father of the Texas Panhandle as having said: "I have met a lot of good men, several fine gentlemen, hordes of cunning climbers, plenty of loud-braying asses and plenty of dumb oxen, but I haven't lived long enough or traveled far enough to meet more than two or three men I'd call great. This is a word I will not bandy around. To me, Charles Goodnight was great-natured."

In Time-Life's 1973 publication The Cowboys, the author states (p. 62): "Goodnight was no better than the rest. Once when his wife expressed shock at some vigilante hangings ('I understand', she exclaimed, 'they hanged them to a telegraph pole!') Charlie replied quietly, 'Well, I don't think it hurt the telegraph pole.' What she didn't know was that the victims had actually been strung up with Goodnight's full approval." The men hanged were caught in the act of murder and cattle rustling.

== In literature ==
The western novelist Matt Braun's novel Texas Empire is based on the life of Goodnight and fictionalizes the founding of the JA Ranch. The Goodnight Trail is the name of a novel by Ralph Compton. Similarly, Mari Sandoz's Old Jules Country in the part "Some dedicated men" relates the difficulties of Goodnight's cattle drives to Colorado. In James A. Michener's novel Centennial, the Skimmerhorn Trail is based on the actual Goodnight-Loving Trail. In addition, his name is mentioned in the novel; the character R. J. Poteet appears to have been based on Goodnight. T. L. Davis' Shadow Soldier features the Goodnight-Loving cattle drive of 1866 as a means for J. D. Wilkes to make it to Colorado with Oliver Loving and in the sequel Home to Texas, Goodnight is often referenced.

All four of Larry McMurtry's Lonesome Dove series novels include brief appearances by Goodnight. His appearance in the prequel Dead Man's Walk is historically inaccurate. The story takes place during the Santa Fe Expedition of 1841, when Goodnight would have been only five years old. Further, Lonesome Dove is a fictionalized account of Goodnight and Loving's third cattle drive. Woodrow F. Call represents Goodnight, Augustus McCrae is Loving. Though the characters have personalities rather different from their real-life counterparts, the novel borrows heavily from actual events, in particular Loving's ambush by Indians and Goodnight's attentive care as Loving died from an arrow-induced infection. Call returns McCrae's body to Texas, just as Goodnight returned Loving for burial in Weatherford. The marker that Call carves for Deets is based on an epitaph Charles Goodnight created for Bose Ikard, an ex-slave who worked alongside Goodnight most of his life. He also plays his largest role in the final volume, Streets of Laredo. He is played in the miniseries Dead Man's Walk by Chris Penn, in Comanche Moon by Jeremy Ratchford, and in Streets of Laredo by James Gammon.

== In television ==
The Yellowstone spin-off show 1883 featured Goodnight as a cameo appearance. In 1883 season 1 episode 7, "Lightning Yellow Hair", Goodnight helps drive off a group of attacking bandits. He was played by series creator and writer Taylor Sheridan.

In the 1978 television miniseries Centennial, a man named Goodnight is mentioned driving cattle to Colorado. It is commonly agreed that he is the one mentioned.

== Namesakes ==
The following are named for Goodnight:

- Charles Goodnight Memorial Trail
- Former town of Goodnight (now a ghost town) in Armstrong County, site of the former Goodnight Baptist College, and birthplace in 1920 of scientist Cullen M. Crain
- The highway to Palo Duro Canyon State Park east of Canyon, Texas
- Goodnight Elementary School, Pueblo, Colorado
- Goodnight Ranch (1869) and Goodnight Barn (1871), Pueblo, Colorado (house was demolished)
- A street in Pueblo, Colorado
- A cabin at YMCA Camp Carter in Fort Worth, Texas
- A street in Mansfield, Texas, off of Debbie Lane
- A street in Alto, New Mexico, outside Ruidoso, is named the Goodnight-Loving Trail.
- A street in Justin, Texas, off F.M. 407 (Goodnight Trail), part of Fort Worth, is located near the Texas Motor Speedway. Part of the subdivision Reatta Ridge also has names such as Loving, Chinos, and Lone Star within the subdivision.

== See also ==
- Fort Sumner, New Mexico
- Oliver Loving, Goodnight's partner
- Goodnight–Loving Trail
- Lonesome Dove series
