= Pinery Station =

Overland Mail stagecoach stop in Texas

- U.S. National Register of Historic Places
- U.S. Historic district
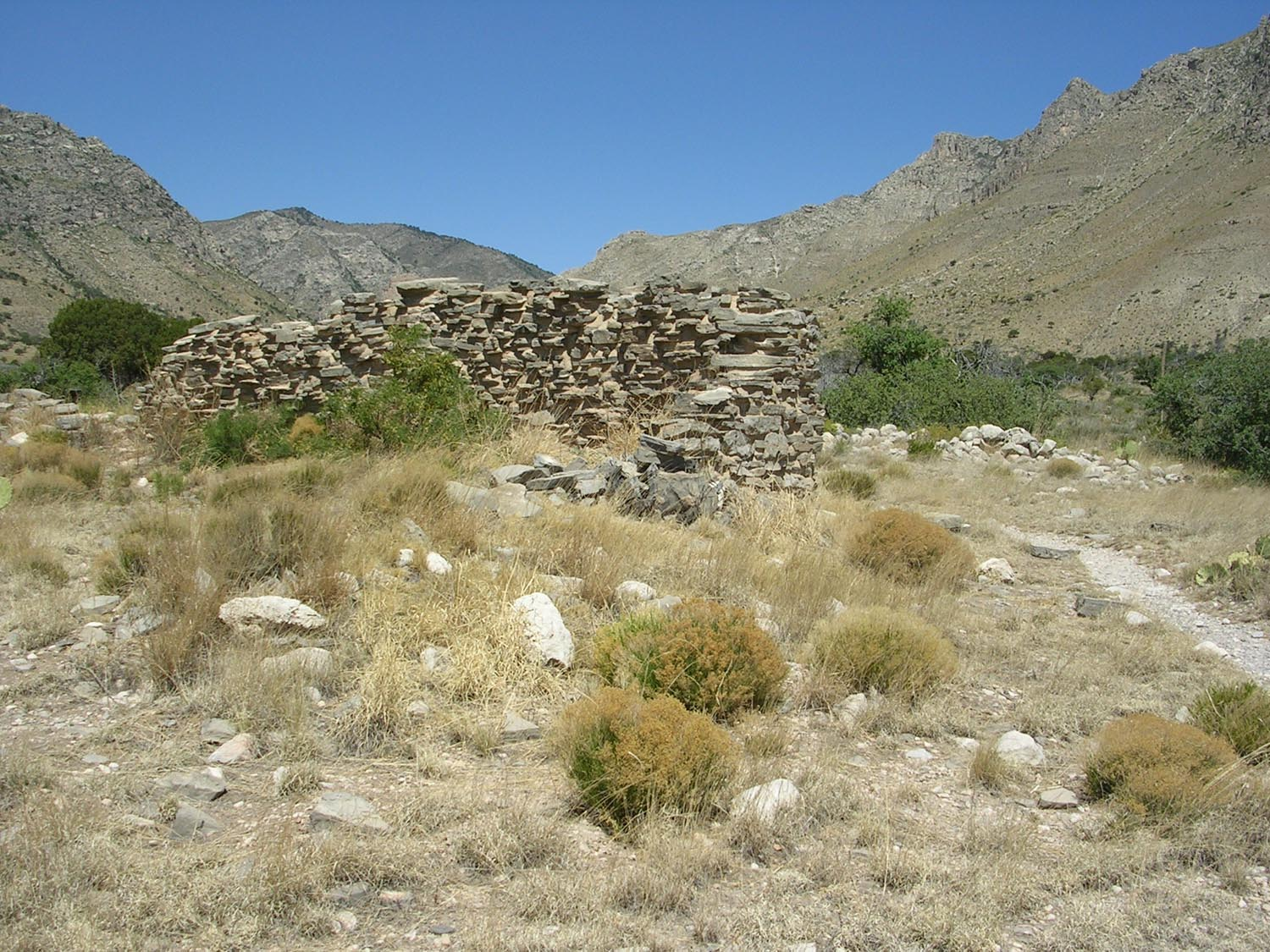
- Ruins of Pinery Station

- Location within Texas Location within the United States
- Location: Off U.S. 62/180, Guadalupe Mountains National Park, Texas
- Coordinates: 31°53′38″N 104°49′1″W
- Area: 1.5 acres (0.61 ha)
- Built: 1858
- Part of: Butterfield Overland Mail Corridor (ID14000524)
- NRHP reference No.: 74000281

Significant dates
- Added to NRHP: October 9, 1974
- Designated HD: August 27, 2014

Pinery Station, or The Pinery, was built as a relay station on the Butterfield Overland Mail stagecoach route, located at the crest of Guadalupe Pass in what is now Guadalupe Mountains National Park in the U.S. state of Texas. The station, now in ruins, was built in 1858 and was abandoned the next year. It is located close by U.S. Routes 62/180 and is accessible for tourists.

The station location had been a camp for military expeditions since 1849. The station was built as a fortification with stone walls protecting a corral and a second enclosure for the three-room station house. The corral measured 67 feet (20 m) by 33 feet (10 m), while the station house enclosure measured 57 feet (17 m) by 41 feet (12 m). The station house rooms measured between 10 feet (3.0 m) square and 10 feet (3.0 m) by 14 feet (4.3 m). The walls were 30 inches (76 cm) thick and 11 feet (3.4 m) high, giving protection from raids by the local Mescalero Apaches. The station was located near Pine Spring and featured good grazing land nearby. The station offered fresh teams of horses and hot meals for stage crews and passengers. In 1859 the trail route was changed to pass close to Fort Davis and Fort Stockton. Even after its abandonment it was used by passers-by on the old trail.

The Pinery was placed on the National Register of Historic Places (NRHP) on October 9, 1974 and became a contributing property within the Butterfield Overland Mail Corridor NRHP historic district on August 27, 2014.

== See also ==
- National Register of Historic Places listings in Culberson County, Texas
