= Presidio Chapel of San Elizario =

- U.S. National Register of Historic Places
- Recorded Texas Historic Landmark
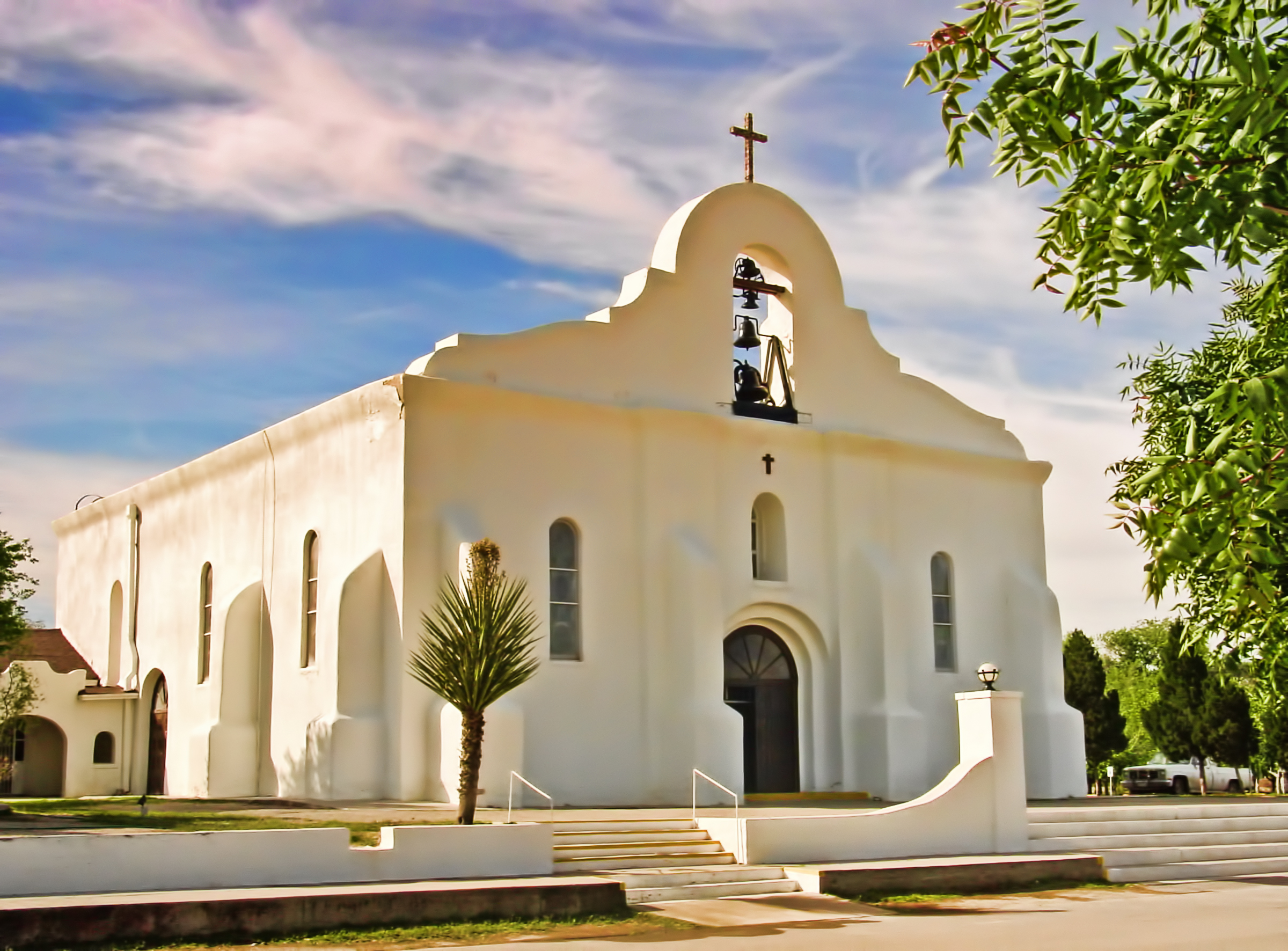
- The front of the chapel

- Location within Texas Location within the United States
- Location: 1556 San Elizario Street, San Elizario, Texas
- Coordinates: 31°35′5″N 106°16′22″W
- Area: 0.5 acres (0.20 ha)
- Built: 1877
- NRHP reference No.: 72001358
- RTHL No.: 4533

Significant dates
- Added to NRHP: September 14, 1972
- Designated RTHL: 1962

The Presidio Chapel of San Elizario (Spanish: La Capilla de San Elcear) was built in 1877 at the same place where an earlier Mexican chapel stood. The building is located in the central square of San Elizario, 17.5 miles south-southeast of El Paso. It was listed on the National Register of Historic Places in 1972. It is an example of the Spanish Colonial style.

== History ==
The chapel provided the religious needs of a presidio or an outpost of military personnel. The presidio was moved to the present site in 1790, to protect travelers and settlers along the Camino Real (Royal Highway) which ran from Mexico City through Paso del Norte to Santa Fe. Its close proximity to the Ysleta and Socorro missions also provided protection for them.

When Mexico became independent from Spain in 1821, the military presence at the presidio decreased. In 1829, the chapel was destroyed by the flood of the Rio Grande. Another chapel was built to replace the lost one. During the Mexican–American War, after San Elizario was occupied by the United States, volunteers from California were stationed at the presidio to prevent the re-occupation. Since 1850, American troops were stationed. By the 1870s, the old chapel proved inadequate, and the present structure was completed in 1877. The bell-tower was constructed later. The exterior appearance has changed very little since then. In 1935, the chapel was badly damaged by fire and subsequently rebuilt.

== Architecture ==
The church is one of the late examples of the adobe architecture in West Texas and reflects European influences on the Spanish Colonial style. It has plastered adobe walls and is painted white.

== See also ==
- National Register of Historic Places listings in El Paso County, Texas
- Recorded Texas Historic Landmarks in El Paso County
