= Oliver Loving =

American rancher (1812–1867)

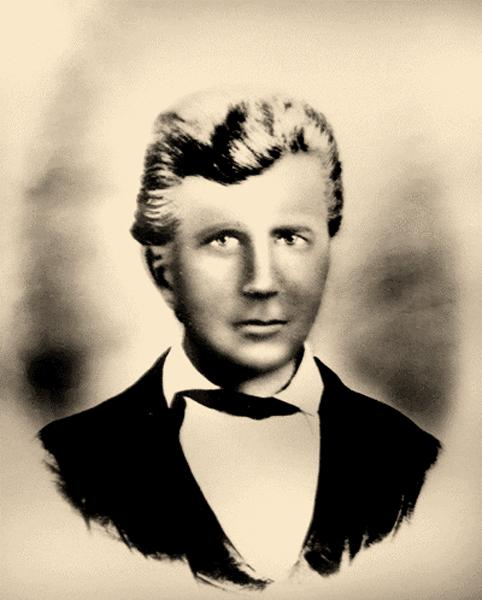
- Born: December 4, 1812; Hopkins County, Kentucky, US
- Died: September 25, 1867 (aged 54); Fort Sumner, New Mexico Territory, US
- Resting place: Greenwood Cemetery in Weatherford, Texas
- Occupations: Rancher, cattle driver
- Political party: Democratic
- Spouse: Susan Doggett Morgan (m. 1833)
- Children: 7, including James C. Loving

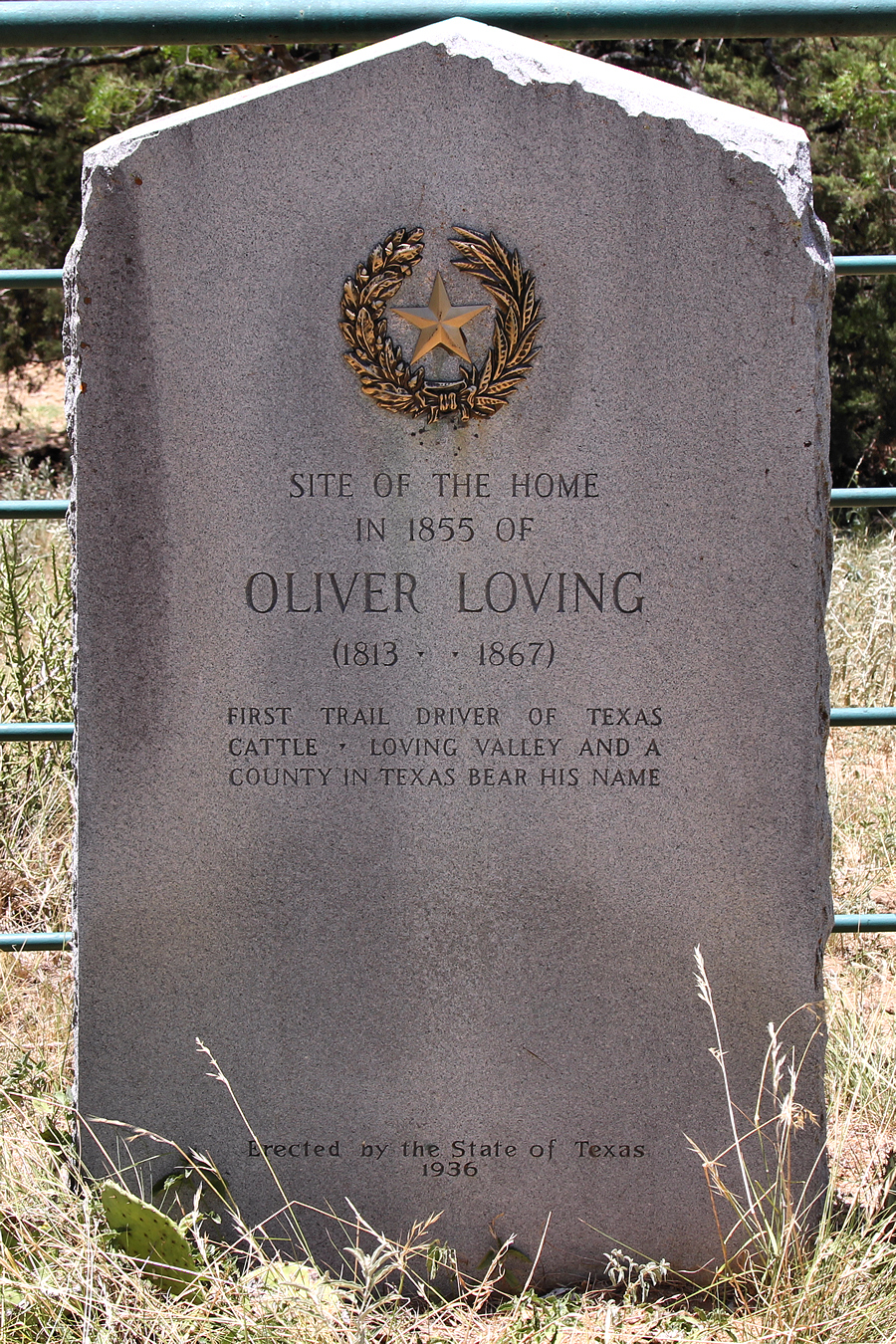
Site of the Home of Oliver Loving in 1855 Texas Centennial historical marker in Palo Pinto County, Texas, United States.

Oliver Loving (December 4, 1812 – September 25, 1867) was an American rancher and cattle driver. Together with Charles Goodnight, he developed the Goodnight–Loving Trail. He was mortally wounded by Comanches while on a cattle drive.

Loving County, Texas, the least-populous county in the United States, is named in his honor.

== Early life ==
Oliver Loving was born on December 4, 1812, in Hopkins County, Kentucky. His father was Joseph Loving and his mother, Susannah Mary Bourland.

== Career ==
In 1833, he became a farmer in Muhlenberg County, Kentucky. Ten years later, with his brother and his brother-in-law, he moved to the Republic of Texas with their families. In Texas, Loving received 639.3 acres (2.59 km^{2}) of land in three patents spread through three counties Collin, Dallas, and Parker. He farmed and, to feed his growing family, hauled freight in his early years as a Texan.

By 1855, he moved with his family to the future Palo Pinto County, Texas, where he ran a country store and ranched on Keechi Creek. By 1857, he owned a thousand acres (4 km^{2}) of land. To market his large herd, Loving drove them out of Texas and in that same year he entrusted his nineteen-year-old son, Joseph, to drive his and his neighbors' cattle to Illinois up the Shawnee Trail. The drive made a profit of $36 head and encouraged Loving to repeat the trek successfully the next year with John Noble Durkee.

On August 29, 1860, together with John Dawson, he started a herd of 1,500 toward Denver, Colorado to feed miners in the area. They crossed the Red River, traveled to the Arkansas River, and followed it to Pueblo, Colorado, where the cattle wintered. In the spring, Loving sold his cattle for gold and tried to leave for Texas. However, the American Civil War had broken out and the Union authorities prevented him from returning to the South until Kit Carson and others interceded for him. During the war, he was commissioned to provide beef to the Confederate States Army and drive cattle along the Mississippi River. When the war ended, the Confederate government reportedly owed him between $100,000 and $250,000. To make matters worse, the usual cattle markets were inadequate for the available supply.

In 1866, having heard about the probable need for cattle at Fort Sumner, New Mexico, where some eight thousand Native American Indians had been settled on a reservation, he gathered a herd, combined it with that of Charles Goodnight, and began a long drive to the fort. Their route later became known as the Goodnight–Loving Trail. The two cattlemen sold beef to the army for $12,000 in gold, and then Loving drove the stock cattle on to Colorado and sold them near Denver, while Goodnight returned to Weatherford, the seat of Parker County, Texas, with the gold and also for a second herd. The two men were reunited in southern New Mexico, where they went into partnership with John Chisum at his ranch in the Bosque Grande, about forty miles south of Fort Sumner. (Chisum's sister Nancy was married to Loving's cousin, B.F. Bourland and had known Chisum for many years.) They spent the winter of 1866-67 there and supplied cattle from the ranch to Fort Sumner and Santa Fe.

== Personal life ==
He married Susan Doggett Morgan in 1833. They had nine children.

== Death ==
In the spring of 1867, Loving and Goodnight returned to Texas, ready to start a new drive. This third drive was slowed by heavy rains and Native American threats. Loving went ahead of the herd for contract bidding, taking only Bill Wilson, a trusted scout, with him. Although Wilson told Loving that he should travel at night through Native American Indian country, Loving pushed ahead during the day. In a Comanche attack, he was seriously wounded at Loving Bend on the Pecos River. The weakened Loving sent Wilson back to the herd, eluded the Indians, and, with the aid of Mexican traders, reached Fort Sumner, only to die there of gangrene. Before he died on September 25, 1867, Goodnight assured him that his wish to be buried in Texas would be carried out. After a temporary burial at Fort Sumner, while Goodnight drove the herd on to Colorado, Goodnight had Loving's body exhumed and returned to Texas. Stories differ as to who accompanied the body back to Weatherford, but he was reburied there in Greenwood Cemetery on March 4, 1868. As a member of Phoenix Lodge No. 275 at Weatherford, Loving was buried with Masonic honors.

== Legacy ==
Loving County, Texas, is named in his honor, as is the town of Loving, New Mexico. Additionally, Loving Bend on the Pecos River is also named for him. He has been inducted into the National Cowboy Hall of Fame in Oklahoma City, Oklahoma. Also, his death was borrowed by novelist Larry McMurtry for his Pulitzer Prize-winning novel Lonesome Dove. In the book, Augustus "Gus" McCrae is injured by Indian arrows and sends his companion Pea Eye Parker to retrieve Woodrow F. Call. McCrae makes it to Miles City, but dies of blood poisoning, despite having one of his legs amputated. Call, like Goodnight, brings him back to Texas to bury him. In 1958, he was inducted into the Hall of Great Westerners of the National Cowboy & Western Heritage Museum.

== Secondary source ==
- Madeline Meyercord. Oliver Loving, Pioneer Drover of Texas. 277 pages.
