= Birchville, Texas =

- Ghost town
- Nickname: Smith's Ranch
- Location within Texas
- Coordinates: 31°22′30″N 105°57′57″W
- Country: United States
- State: Texas
- County: Hudspeth
- Time zone: UTC-7 (Mountain (MST))
  - Summer (DST): UTC-6 (MDT)
- GNIS feature ID: 2034616

Birchville, or Smith Ranch, now a ghost town, was located in what is now Hudspeth County, Texas, United States. Birchville was a settlement on the San Antonio-El Paso Road in what was El Paso County. Birchville lay 35 miles northwest of the First Camp on Rio Grande and 24.8 miles southeast of San Elizario, according to the table of distances for the San Antonio-San Diego Mail Line in the Texas Almanac of 1857. Later used as a station on the Butterfield Overland Mail, the distances to the station for that line were given as 24 1/2 miles from San Elizario, 33 miles from Fort Quitman.

== History ==
Birchville, or Smith Ranch Station, was a stop on the San Antonio-San Diego Mail Line in 1857, and from 1858 to 1861 a stagecoach station on the Butterfield Overland Mail route. Its station agent, George Lyles, was a grocer who lived there with his family. Also, two employees lived in the household, including a cook. An eating house provided travelers a meal during stagecoach stops while the horses were being changed. It remained as a station of Butterfield Overland Mail's successor, the Overland Mail, until 1862, when the Union Army occupied El Paso County.

During the Civil War, Lyles remained in the area providing mesquite beans, to the Union Army garrison at Franklin, Texas (El Paso). When Bethel Coopwood revived the San Antonio-El Paso Mail in 1866, Birchville was again a stagecoach station but the settlement was destroyed by a flood of the Rio Grande in 1867 and never revived.

== Location of the site ==
The exact location of Birchville has yet to be found. It may have been obliterated by the floods of the Rio Grande in 1867 or during the later 19th century, or buried under agricultural lands along the river. Mileage from San Elizario on the old road put it approximately two miles south of the El Paso - Hudspeth County line nearby Texas State Highway 20.
