= El Paso–Juárez =

Trans-border agglomeration between US and Mexico

- Transborder Agglomeration
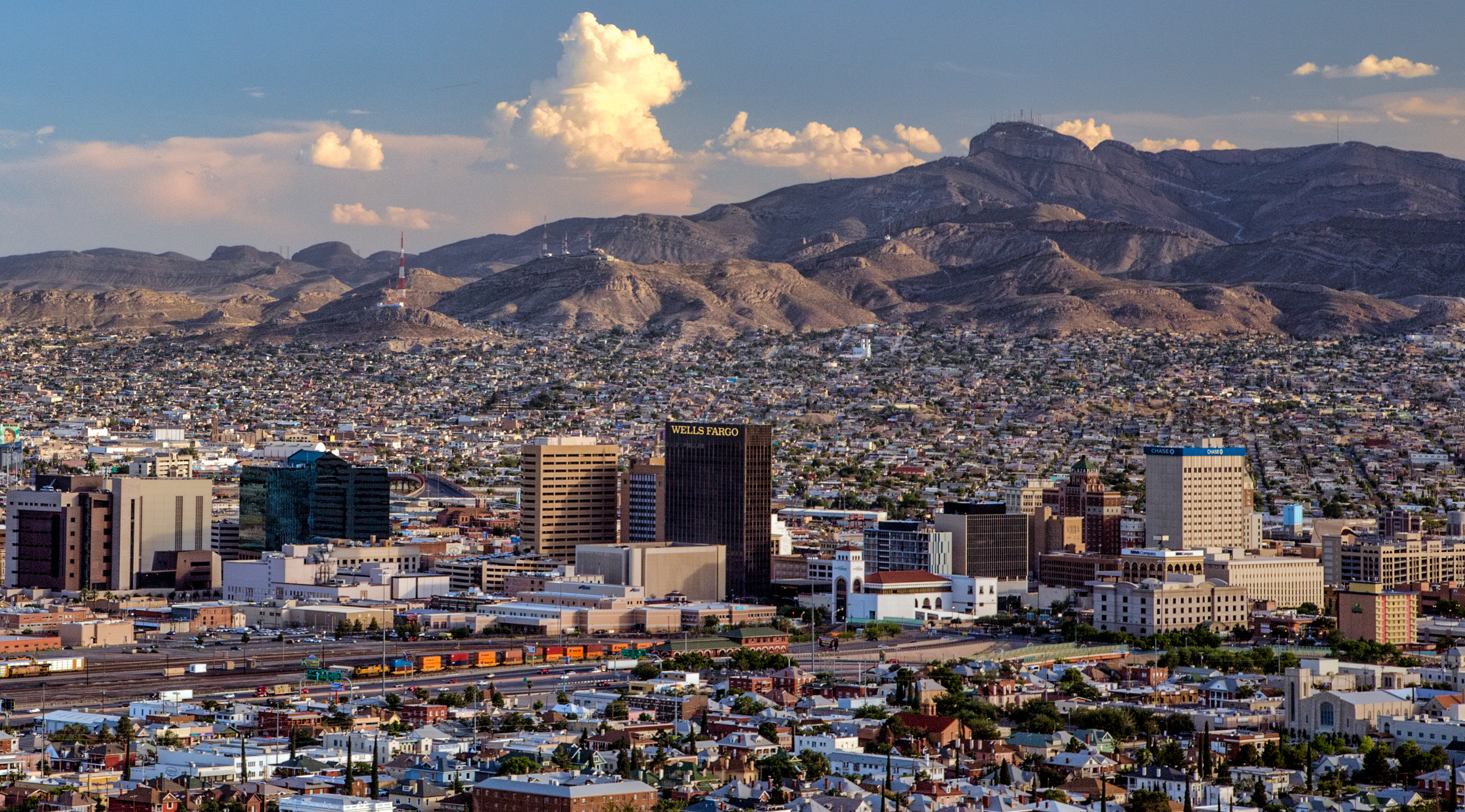
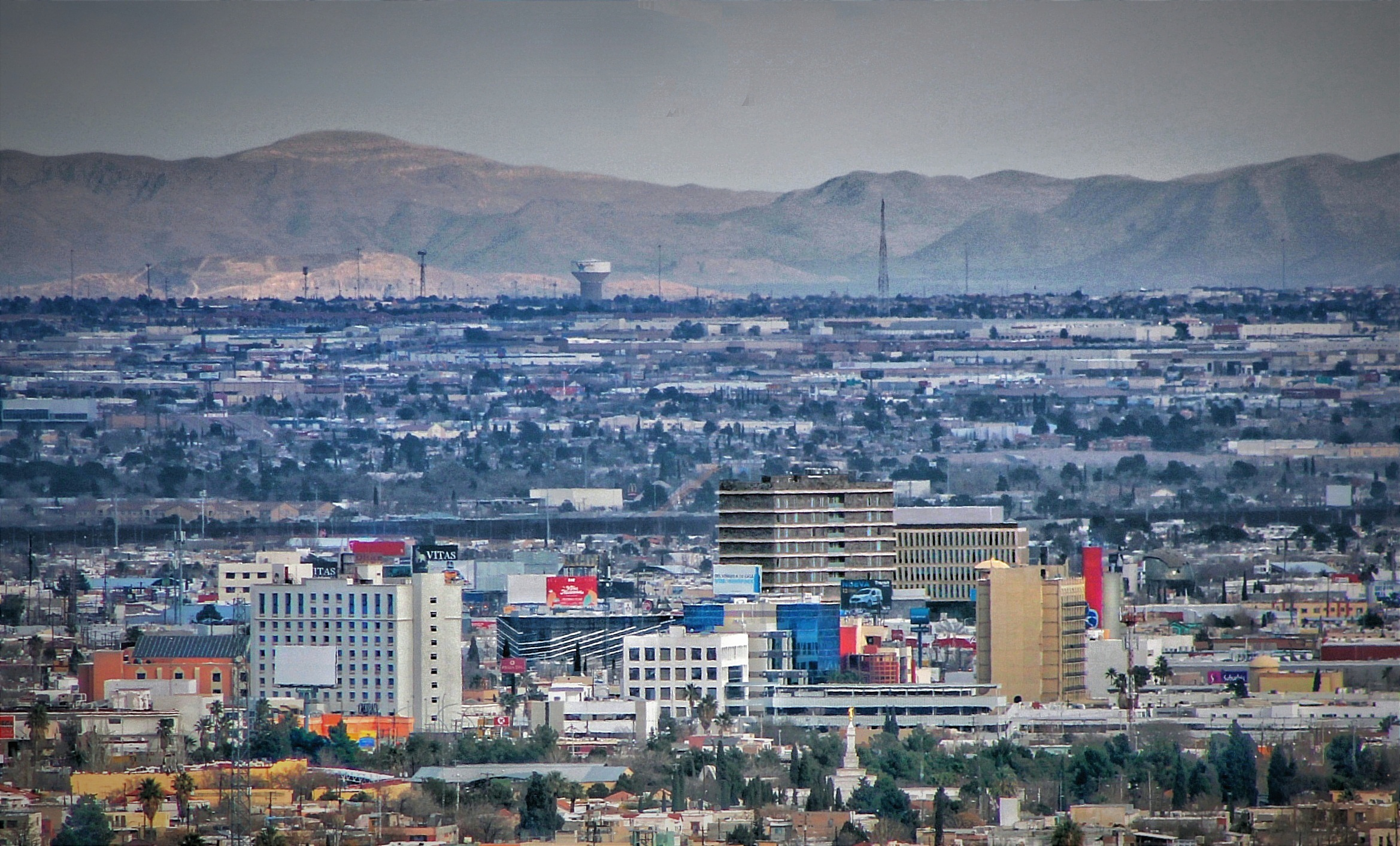
- El Paso Ciudad Juárez
- Nickname: Paso del Norte
Map of El Paso–Juárez
Transborder Agglomeration
El Paso, TX MSA
City of El Paso
Las Cruces, NM MSA
City of Las Cruces
Ciudad Juárez, Chihuahua ZM
- Coordinates: 31°44′22″N 106°29′13″W
- Countries: United States, Mexico
- States: Mexico, Chihuahua, New Mexico

Area
  - Total: 390 sq mi (1,000 km^{2})

Population
  - Total: 2,400,000
  - Density: 6,200/sq mi (2,400/km^{2})

GDP (Nominal, 2023)
  - Total: US$70.4 billion
- Time zone: UTC–07:00 (Zona Pacífico)
  - Summer (DST): UTC–06:00 (DST)

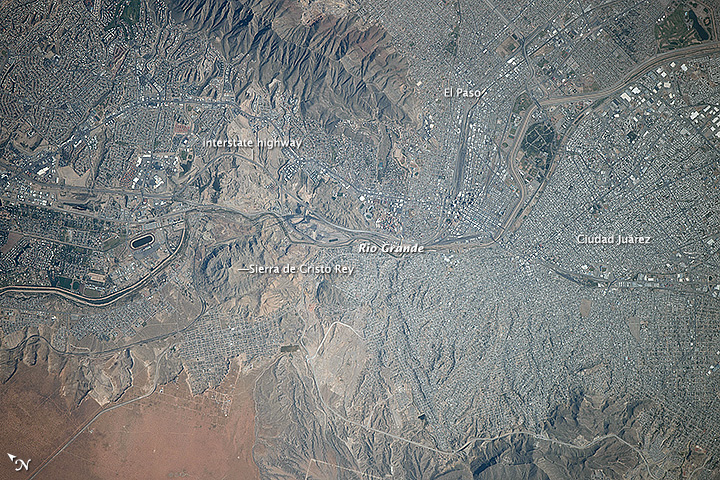
El Paso and Ciudad Juárez from the ISS, 2014

El Paso–Juárez, also known as Juárez–El Paso, the Borderplex or Paso del Norte, is a transborder agglomeration, on the border between Mexico and the United States. The region is centered on two large cities: Ciudad Juárez, Chihuahua, Mexico, and El Paso, Texas, United States. Additionally, nearby Las Cruces, New Mexico, U.S., is sometimes included as part of the region, referred to as El Paso–Juárez–Las Cruces or El Paso–Juárez–Southern New Mexico. With over 2.4 million people, this binational region is the 2nd largest conurbation (San Diego–Tijuana being the largest) on the United States–Mexico border. The El Paso–Juárez region is the largest bilingual, binational work force in the Western Hemisphere.

State	Population	GDP (billion, US$)
El Paso	879,392	48.6
Ciudad Juárez	1,512,450	21.8
El Paso–Juárez	2,391,842	70.4

This region is commonly subdivided into the Juárez Metropolitan Area (Zona Metropolitana de Juárez) in Chihuahua, Greater El Paso in Texas and Greater Las Cruces in New Mexico. These sub-regions are typically defined by state borders, even though some New Mexico towns in the region like Sunland Park are significantly closer to El Paso than to Las Cruces.

== Demographics ==
Ciudad Juárez is the largest city in the region (population 1,321,004 as of 2010). El Paso is the next largest (682,669 as of 2018), and Las Cruces is the third largest (102,296 as of 2018).

Major American suburbs are Fabens, Texas; San Elizario, Texas; Socorro, Texas; and Sunland Park, New Mexico. Smaller communities include Anthony, New Mexico; Anthony, Texas; Canutillo, Texas; Chaparral, New Mexico; Horizon City, Texas; Mesilla, New Mexico; Santa Teresa, New Mexico; University Park, New Mexico; Vado, New Mexico; and Westway, Texas.

The population of El Paso has historically been dominated by both Mexican Americans and non-Hispanic white Americans; in recent decades the former group has come to dominate the population. In 1970 El Paso was 57.3% Hispanic and 40.4% non-Hispanic white; in 2010 it was 80.7% Hispanic and 14.2% non-Hispanic white. In the same year El Paso County was 82.2% Hispanic.

== History ==
The Franklin Mountains region has had human settlement for thousands of years, as evidenced by Folsom points from hunter-gatherers found at Hueco Tanks. The earliest known cultures in the region were maize farmers. At the time of the arrival of the Spanish the Manso, Suma, and Jumano tribes populated the area and today form the basis of the Mestizo culture in the area. The Mescalero Apache roamed the region as well.

Spanish explorer Don Juan de Oñate was the first European explorer to arrive at the Rio Grande near modern Ciudad Juárez and El Paso in 1598, celebrating Thanksgiving Mass there on April 30, 1598 (several decades before the Pilgrims' Thanksgiving). El Paso del Norte (the present-day Ciudad Juárez), was founded on the south bank of the Río Bravo del Norte (Rio Grande) in 1659 by Spanish conquistadors. The Mission Nuestra Señora de Guadalupe became its first major settlement. Being a grassland then, agriculture flourished and vineyards and fruits constituted the bulk of the regional production. The Spanish Crown and the local authorities of El Paso del Norte had made several land concessions to bring agricultural production to the northern bank of the river in present-day El Paso. However, the Apaches dissuaded settlement and development across the river. The water provided a natural defense against them.

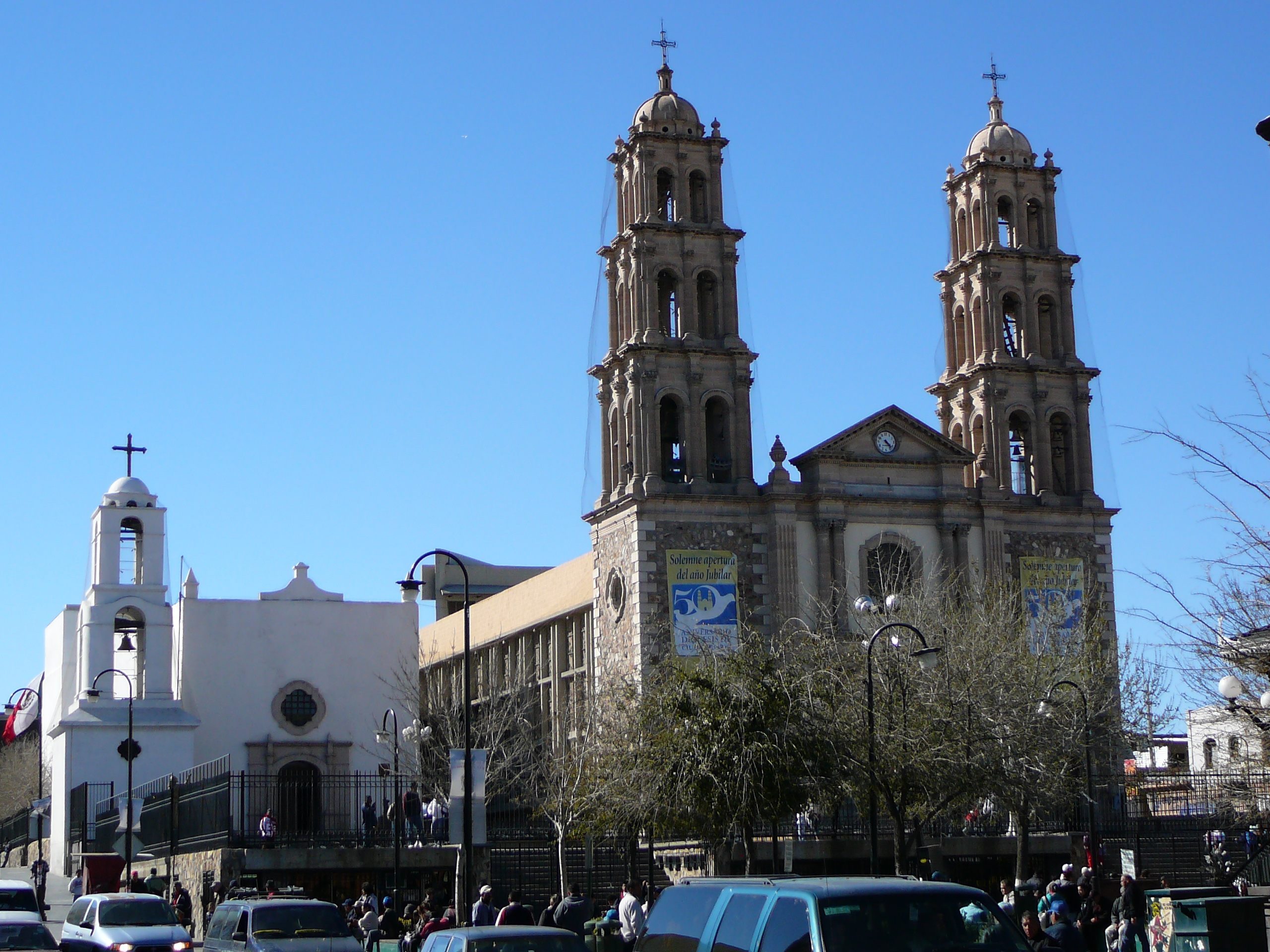
The Mission Nuestra Señora de Guadalupe

El Paso became the southernmost locality of the Provincia de Nuevo Mexico (modern New Mexico). It remained the largest city in New Mexico until its north side was ceded to the US in 1850. It communicated with Santa Fe and Mexico City by the Royal Road. American spies, traders and fur trappers visited the area since 1804 and some intermarried with the area's Hispanic elite. Although there was no combat in the region during the Mexican War of Independence, El Paso del Norte experienced the negative effects it had on its wine trade.

The Texas Revolution (1836) was not felt in the region as the area was never considered part of Texas until 1848. Given the blurry reclamations of the Texas Republic that wanted a chunk of the Santa Fe trade, the Treaty of Guadalupe Hidalgo effectively made the settlements on the north bank of the river a formal American settlement, separate from Old El Paso del Norte on the Mexican side. The present Texas-New Mexico boundary placing El Paso on the Texas side was drawn in the Compromise of 1850.

The communities on both sides of the border continued to function, in large part, as a single community. The United States Senate fixed a boundary between Texas and New Mexico at the thirty-second parallel, thus largely ignoring history and topography. A military post called "The Post opposite El Paso" (meaning opposite El Paso del Norte, across the Rio Grande) was established in 1854. Further west, a settlement on Coons' Rancho called Franklin became the nucleus of the future El Paso, Texas. A year later pioneer Anson Mills completed his plan of the town, calling it El Paso and the town was incorporated in 1873. During the French intervention in Mexico (1862–1867), El Paso del Norte served as a temporary stop for republican forces of ousted leader Benito Juárez until he established his government-in-exile in Chihuahua. In 1888, El Paso del Norte was renamed in honor of Juárez.

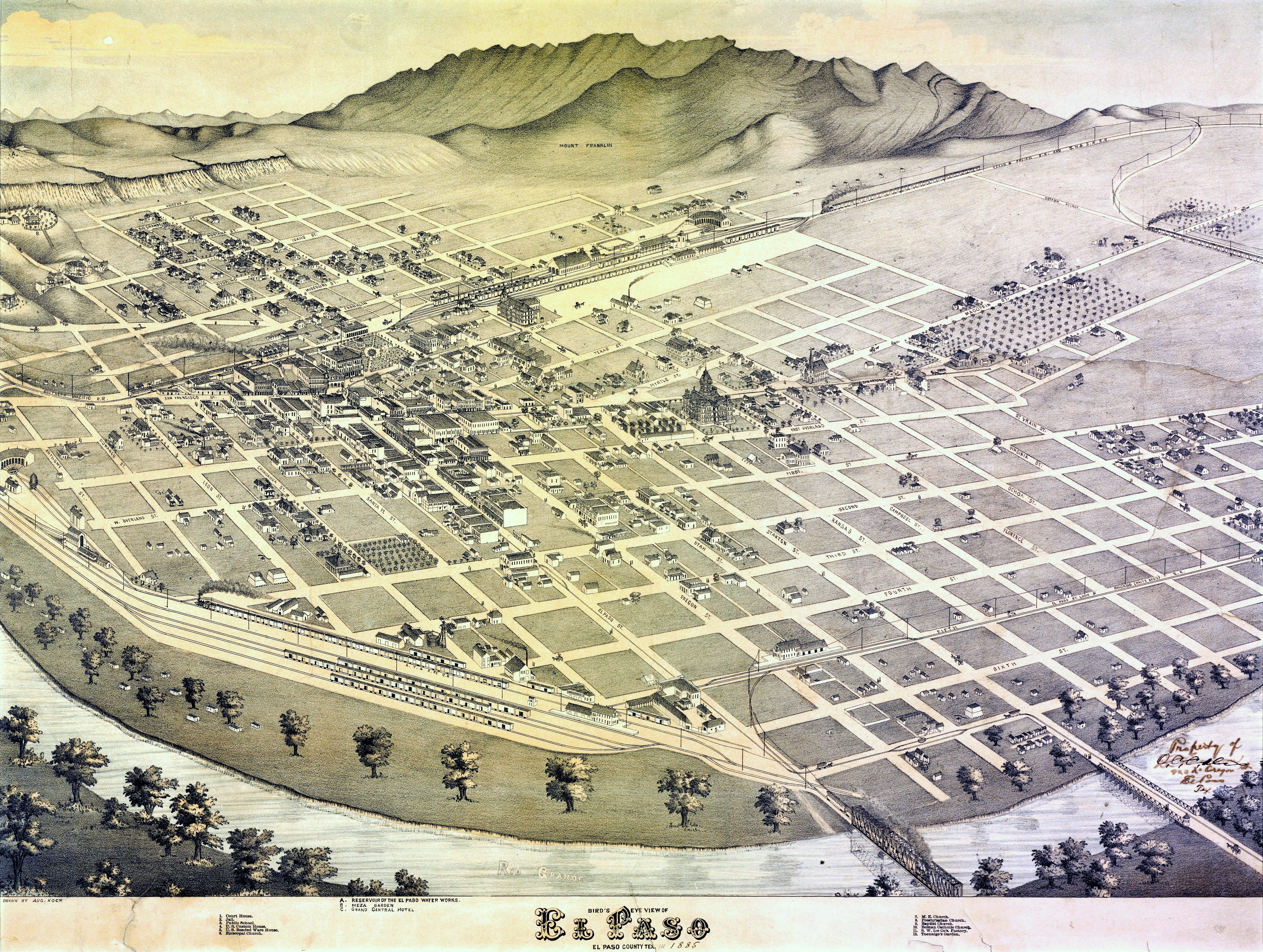
Map of El Paso in 1886.

In the later 19th century the population in the region began to grow rapidly. With the arrival of the Southern Pacific, Texas and Pacific and the Atchison, Topeka and Santa Fe railroads in 1881, trade with the rest of the U.S. increased substantially. The area attracted newcomers ranging from businessmen and priests, to gunfighters and prostitutes. In the U.S. El Paso became known as the "Six Shooter Capital" because of its lawlessness. Prostitution and gambling flourished. During World War I, the U.S. Department of the Army pressured El Paso authorities to crack down on vice, creating a tourist boom in Juárez whose vice businesses continued to thrive.

Mining and other industries gradually developed in the area. The 1920s and 1930s saw the emergence of major business development in the city partially enabled by Prohibition era bootlegging with the area becoming a significant port of entry for liquor. The Depression era hit the region hard and population declined through the end of World War II. Following the war, military expansion in the area as well as oil discoveries in the Texas Permian Basin helped spur redevelopment in the mid-1900s. Disparities in wages and cost of living between the U.S. and Mexico helped encourage many businesses to establish manufacturing operations in Mexico during the mid 20th century, thus making El Paso–Juárez an attractive location for manufacturing. The signing of the North American Free Trade Agreement helped spur this trend even further.

== Geography ==
Typical elevation in the El Paso–Juárez region is approximately 4,000 feet (1,200 m), though the Franklin Mountains, which run through the region, have peaks rising much higher. North Franklin Peak, for example, rises to 7,192 feet (2,192 m).

The most well-known feature of the area is the Rio Grande, which divides the U.S. from Mexico. The river flows through the Rio Grande Rift, which passes around the southern end of the Franklin Mountains. West of Juárez and El Paso the river turns away from the border, connecting these cities with Las Cruces, New Mexico.

Mt. Cristo Rey, a volcanic peak (an example of a pluton), rises within the Rio Grande Rift just to the west of El Paso on the New Mexico side of the Rio Grande. Other volcanic features include Kilbourne Hole and Hunt's Hole, which are maar volcanic craters 30 miles (48 km) west of the Franklin Mountains.

The area lies in the Chihuahuan Desert, which itself is the easternmost section of the Basin and Range Region.

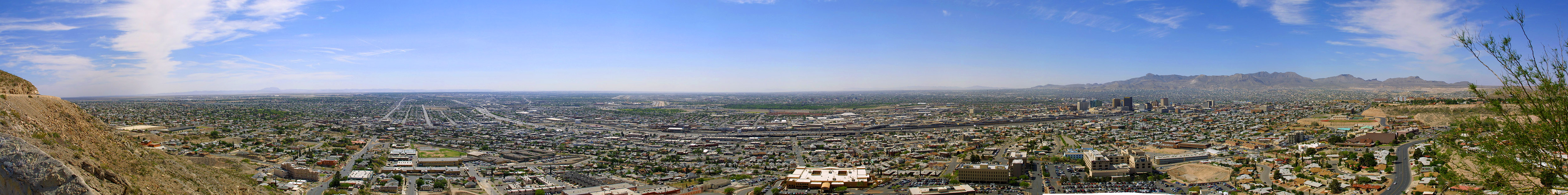
A panoramic view of El Paso–Juárez from the north. The Hueco Mountains can be seen toward the east, and the Juárez mountains of Mexico can be seen to the south (far right of the image).

== Climate ==
Ciudad Juárez

Climate chart (precipitation, max. and min. temperature)
J	F	M	A	M	J	J	A	S	O	N	D
6.5 14 0	9.6 17 2	9.1 20 5	3.9 24 8	4.9 29 12	7.3 32 16	55 31 18	44 30 17	19 29 14	11 25 9	10 19 4	12 14 1
- █ Average max. and min. temperatures in °C
- █ Precipitation totals in mm
- Source: (2010-02-18),INEGI, 2006 report
Imperial conversion
J	F	M	A	M	J	J	A	S	O	N	D
0.3 57 32	0.4 63 36	0.4 68 41	0.2 75 46	0.2 84 54	0.3 90 61	2.2 88 64	1.7 86 63	0.7 84 57	0.4 77 48	0.4 66 39	0.5 57 34
- █ Average max. and min. temperatures in °F
- █ Precipitation totals in inches

The area has an arid climate because it is located in the Chihuahuan desert. The area experiences hot summers, cool winters and a mild spring and fall. In Juárez the average high is 31 °C (88 °F) with lows of 17 °C (63 °F). The winter high is 14 °C (57 °F) with lows of 1 °C (34 °F). Because of the high altitude the region is cooler than many desert areas in Mexico and the American Southwest. Rainfall is scarce and concentrated in the summer months. Snowfall is not a rare event—it normally snows once or twice every winter.

== Economy ==
El Paso–Juárez is a major center for manufacturing and international trade. It is one of the largest ports of entry on the U.S.–Mexico border. The region is also the second most important trade point on the border and the 14th largest trading center in the U.S. In 2018, US$81.88 billion in trade took place in the region.

As of 2010 the region holds offices for more than 70 Fortune 500 companies. It is also home to more than 320 manufacturing plants (those in Ciudad Juárez are commonly referred to as maquiladoras) and more than 1,100 manufacturing operations total. The largest sectors of manufacturing are automobiles and automobile components, and consumer electronic components. Apparel and textile manufacturing, though, are important sectors as well, particularly north of the border. The area employs approximately 262,000 people in manufacturing with 85% of those in Juárez. Many of the workers in Juárez, however, live in the United States.

An important pillar of the economy of El Paso has been Fort Bliss and Biggs Army Airfield. Since frontier days military spending, directly and indirectly, has provided a significant source of money to El Paso and to the region as a whole. As of 2018 the economic impact of Fort Bliss is estimated at more than US$23.13 billion.

Call centers are additionally major employers in El Paso and neighboring communities in the U.S.

With the opening of Texas Tech University Health Sciences Center El Paso in 2009, the school became the first medical school to open in 30 years. The university in 2013 became the fourth freestanding institution of the TTU System, and since its opening, the university has expanded to include the Paul L. Foster School of Medicine, the Gayle Greve Hunt School of Nursing, and the Graduate School of Biomedical Sciences. A fourth school, the Woody L. Hunt School of Dental Medicine is expected to open in 2021. The new medical school has become a great contributor to the region's economy, in 2015 the school contributed US$227 million to the local economy.

=== Regional cooperation ===
Though the national boundaries are an important point of separation, efforts at regional planning and economic integration exist in the local governments and the business communities. Regional business advocacy groups such as El Paso Regional Economic Development Corporation and World Trade Center El Paso/Juárez serve to attract businesses to the area and market its benefits. Efforts at community and environmental cooperation including the Paso del Norte Clean Cities Coalition exist as well.

== Education ==
The largest universities in the region are the University of Texas at El Paso and the Universidad Autónoma de Ciudad Juárez (Autonomous University of Ciudad Juárez). These universities have strong ties to each other (as well as to the Universidad Autónoma de Chihuahua) with formal programs of exchange for scholars and students. Texas Tech University Health Sciences Center El Paso plays a major part in the region because it is one of the few stand alone Medical Schools, where they work closely with Doctors Without Borders. New Mexico State University in Las Cruces is an additional major university in the area.

Other area colleges include Universidad Tecnológica de Ciudad Juárez (Technological University of Ciudad Juárez), Howard Payne University-El Paso, Park University, Southwest University at El Paso, Strayer University, Webster University, and Western Technical College-El Paso. El Paso Community College and Doña Ana Community College provide supplemental higher-education opportunities for students in the region.

== Culture ==
=== Community contact ===
Until the 1920s and 1930s the communities of Ciudad Juárez and El Paso enjoyed largely unfettered access to one another, maintaining a sense of unity. Prohibition and World War II brought about more strict enforcement of the border in this region, making access between the communities more difficult. Nevertheless, the communities have continued to share ethnic and cultural bonds particularly as economic integration in the later 20th century has re-opened much of the access between the communities. Even today the cities still see themselves as a single, closely tied community.

The violence in Ciudad Juárez that erupted in 2008–2009 has forced the U.S. to tighten its policies regarding allowing Juárez residents access to El Paso. Tourists, workers, and students who were once allowed regular access across the border have been restricted to much tighter schedules for travel.

=== Parks and recreation ===
The area is home to numerous parks and venues for outdoor recreation. The 24,000-acre (9,700 ha) Franklin Mountains State Park in El Paso is the largest urban park in the United States. Other urban parks in the area include Ascarate Park (El Paso), Parque Central (Juárez), Parque Chamizal (Juárez), Preciado Park (Las Cruces), and Rio Bosque Park (Socorro, Texas).

Outside the metropolitan area there are major state and national parks in the vicinity. The most well-known of these is Big Bend National Park, which is adjacent to Big Bend Ranch State Park. Closer to the cities are Guadalupe Mountains National Park, Lincoln National Forest, and Gila National Forest.

=== Crime and safety ===
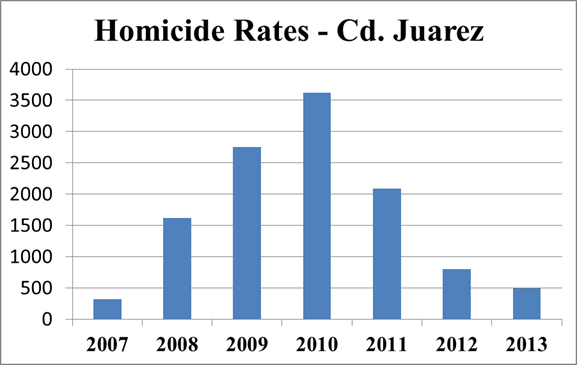
Chart showing decline in the murder rate. Source: InSightCrime.org

While violent crime has been an increasingly serious issue in Cd. Juárez since the 1990s, El Paso has remained one of the safest large cities in the United States. In January 2014, El Paso was ranked as the safest large city in the United States for the fourth straight year according to the annual City Crime Rankings by CQ Press. El Paso has been in the study's top three large cities with the lowest crime rates since 1997. Though violent crime on the U.S. side of the border has remained very low, murders in Juárez related to the drug cartels began to grow rapidly after 2007. In 2008, officials reported more than 5,400 drug-related murders in Mexico, many in and near Juárez. On 20 February 2009, the U.S. State Department announced in an updated travel alert that "Mexican authorities report that more than 1,800 people have been killed in the city since January 2008." CNN listed the city among the ten most dangerous in the world in 2010. The deteriorating situation caused drastic changes in daily life for citizens in Juárez after 2008.

After the homicide rates escalated to the point of making Cd. Juárez the most violent city in the world, the city has seen a significant and steady decline in violent crime since then. In 2012, homicides were at their lowest rate since 2007 when drug violence flared between the Sinaloa cartel and the Juarez Cartel. That trend has continued in 2013 when 497 homicides were reported, the lowest amount since 2007, dropping Ciudad Juárez to the 37th spot of most dangerous cities.

== Infrastructure ==
=== Healthcare ===
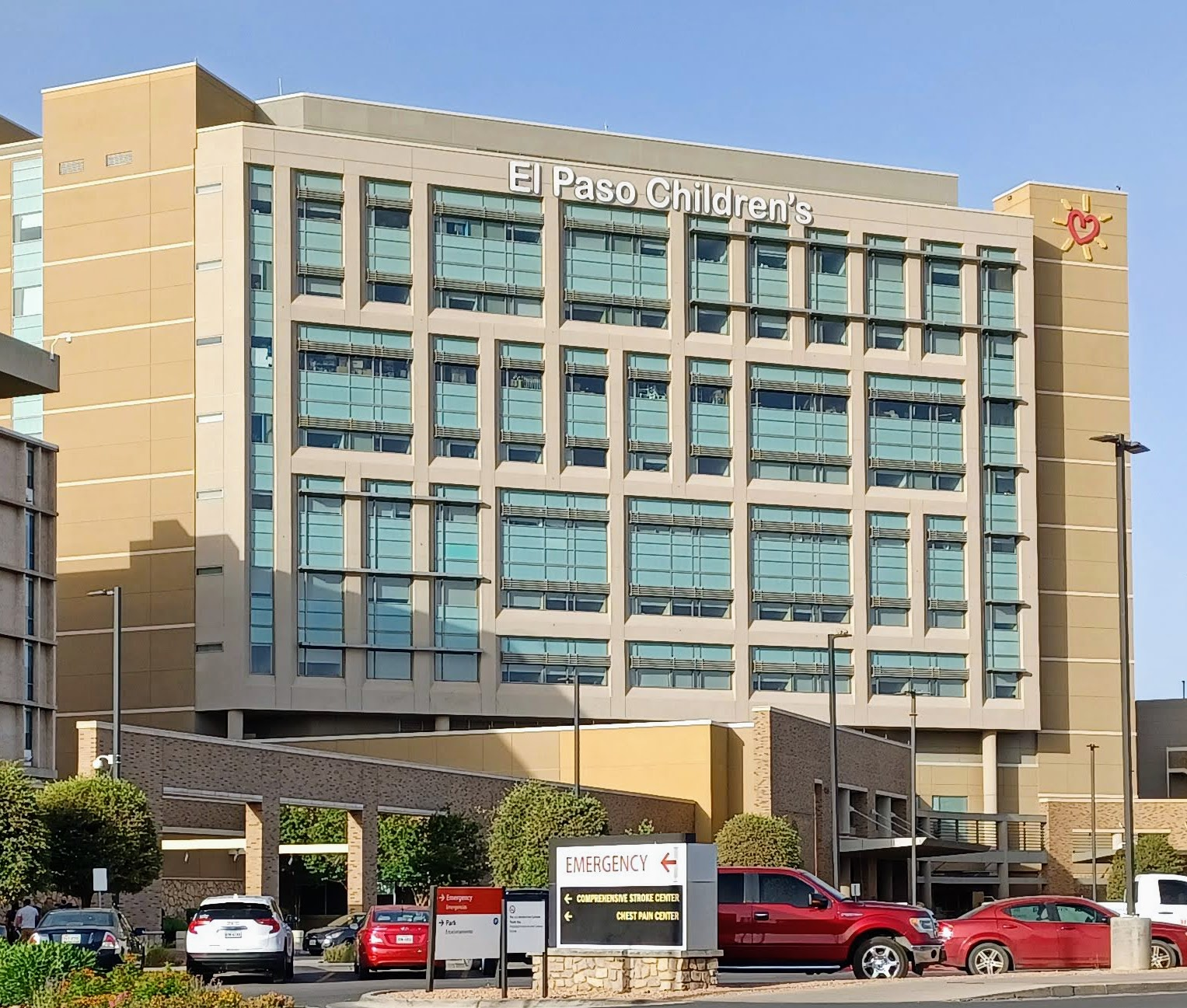
El Paso Children's Hospital at the Medical Center of the Americas

El Paso is the medical hub of West Texas and Southern New Mexico, hosting numerous state-of-the-art medical centers. Some of the city's top hospitals include University Medical Center of El Paso, William Beaumont Army Medical Center, Sierra Medical Center, Las Palmas Medical Center, Del Sol Medical Center, Sierra Providence East Medical Center, El Paso Children's Hospital, Providence Memorial Hospital, and The Hospitals of Providence Transmountain Campus. University Medical Center is the only level I trauma center in the region. William Beaumont Army Medical Center will be replaced by a new state of the art $1.2 billion Fort Bliss Replacement Hospital that will keep the same name and is expected to open in September 2020.

El Paso is also home to the Medical Center of the Americas, an integrated complex of medical facilities anchored by Texas Tech University Health Sciences Center at El Paso, Paul L. Foster School of Medicine, University Medical Center, the El Paso Psychiatric Center and by the El Paso Children's Hospital. It is also site to the Cardwell Collaborative biomedical research building, the Gayle Greve Hunt School of Nursing, and the Graduate School of Biomedical Sciences. The Woody L. Hunt School of Dental Medicine is expected to open in 2021 in the MCA area as well.

=== Transportation ===
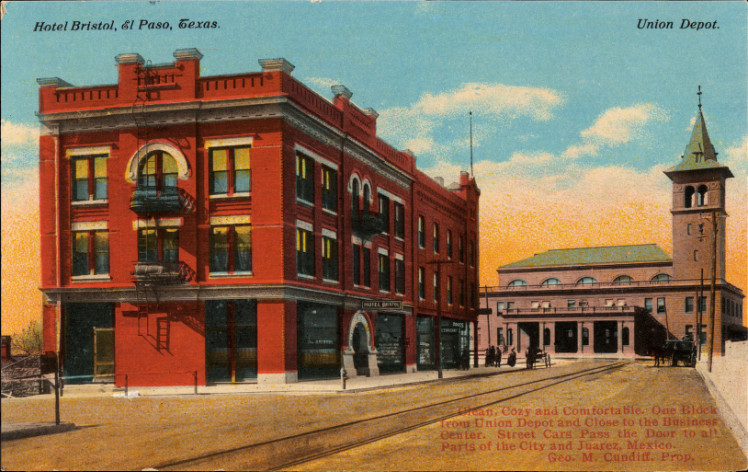
Hotel Bristol and the Union Depot at El Paso, Texas (postcard, circa 1912)

El Paso is served by El Paso International Airport, Amtrak via the historic Union Depot, I-10, US 54 (known locally as "54", the "North-South Freeway" or officially as the Patriot Freeway), Spur 601 (Liberty Expressway), US 180 and US 62 (Montana Avenue), US 85 (Paisano Drive), Loop 375, Loop 478 (Copia Street-Pershing Drive-Dyer Street), numerous Texas Farm-to-Market roads (a class of state highway commonly abbreviated to FM) and the city's original thoroughfare, SH 20, the eastern portion of which is known locally as Alameda Avenue (formerly US 80). Texas 20 also includes portions of Texas Avenue in Central El Paso, Mesa Street from Downtown to the West Side, and Doniphan Drive on the West Side. Northeast El Paso is connected to West El Paso by Transmountain Road(Loop 375). The city also shares four international bridges and one railbridge with Ciudad Juárez. In 2009, El Paso was home to number 52, number 98, and number 100 of the 100 most congested roads in Texas, which are, respectively: North Zaragoza Road between Sun Fire Boulevard and Interstate 10; Lee Trevino Drive between Montana Avenue and I-10; and I-10 between the Patriot Freeway and Loop 375.

=== BRT system ===
The ViveBus BRT system opened to the public in November 2013 with the first route of 5 planned. The project was made a reality with the collaboration of the local municipal government, the private enterprise of Integradora de Transporte de Juarez (INTRA) as well as other city government agencies. Studies have shown that the current bus system averages 8 mph while the new system is projected to average 16 mph. The BRT system studies conducted by the Instituto Municipal de Investigación y Planeación project a daily ridership of 40,000.

The first of the five routes opened to users in late 2013 and is officially named Presidencia-Tierra Nueva and has 34 stations distributed along the north to south corridor. The route starts at Avenida Francisco Villa, follows north to Eje Vial Norte-Sur then veers left at Zaragoza Blvd. and ends at Avenida Independencia and the elevated Carretera Federal 2.

==== El Paso Streetcar ====
The El Paso Streetcar is a streetcar system in El Paso, Texas, that opened for service on November 9, 2018, and uses a fleet of restored PCC streetcars that had served the city's previous system until its closure in 1974. The system covers 4.8 miles (7.7 km) (round trip) in two loops from Downtown El Paso to University of Texas at El Paso. The system was constructed under the authority of the Camino Real Regional Mobility Authority, but when the major construction was completed, around spring 2018, it was transferred to Sun Metro, for operation and maintenance. As of 2016, construction of the system was projected to cost $97 million.

==== Airports ====
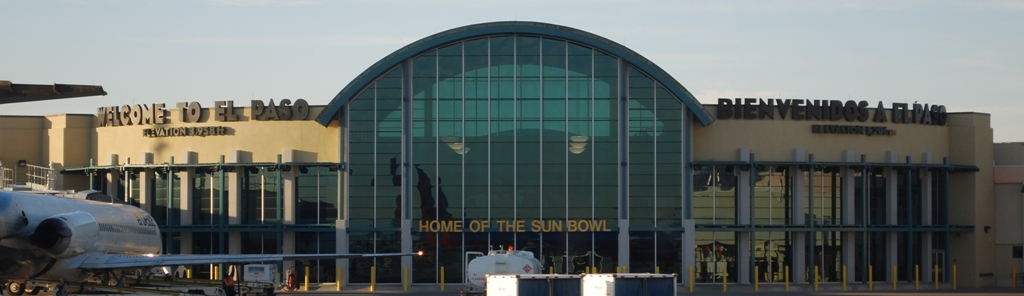
Airport Security Concourse at the El Paso International Airport

- El Paso International Airport

El Paso International Airport, a public airport four miles northeast of Downtown El Paso, has fifteen gates on two concourses and is served by seven major airlines, Alaska, Allegiant, American, Delta, Frontier, Southwest, and United Airlines and has flights to fourteen direct destinations. In 2018, the airport accommodated 3,260,556 commercial passengers, an 11.3% increase or a little over 331,000 passenger increase from the previous year. The El Paso International Airport is home to the US/Mexico border largest cargo facilities and continues to have steady annual growth in air freight traffic through the airport. In 2018 El Paso International Airport was ranked 38th in air cargo traffic among American airports, it handled 700,728,342 lbs of air cargo, an increase of 33.45% from the previous year.

- Abraham González International Airport

Abraham Gonzalez International Airport is located at the southern end of Cd. Juárez. It accommodates the national and international air traffic of the city of Ciudad Juárez. The airport is served by five major airlines Aeroméxico, Interjet, TAR Aerolíneas, VivaAerobus, and Volaris and has non-stop flights to twelve destinations. In 2017, Abraham González International Airport handled 1,173,135 passengers, and in 2018 it handled 1,364,028 passengers, an increase of 16.3%.

- Biggs Army Airfield
- Horizon Airport
- Dona Ana International Jetport

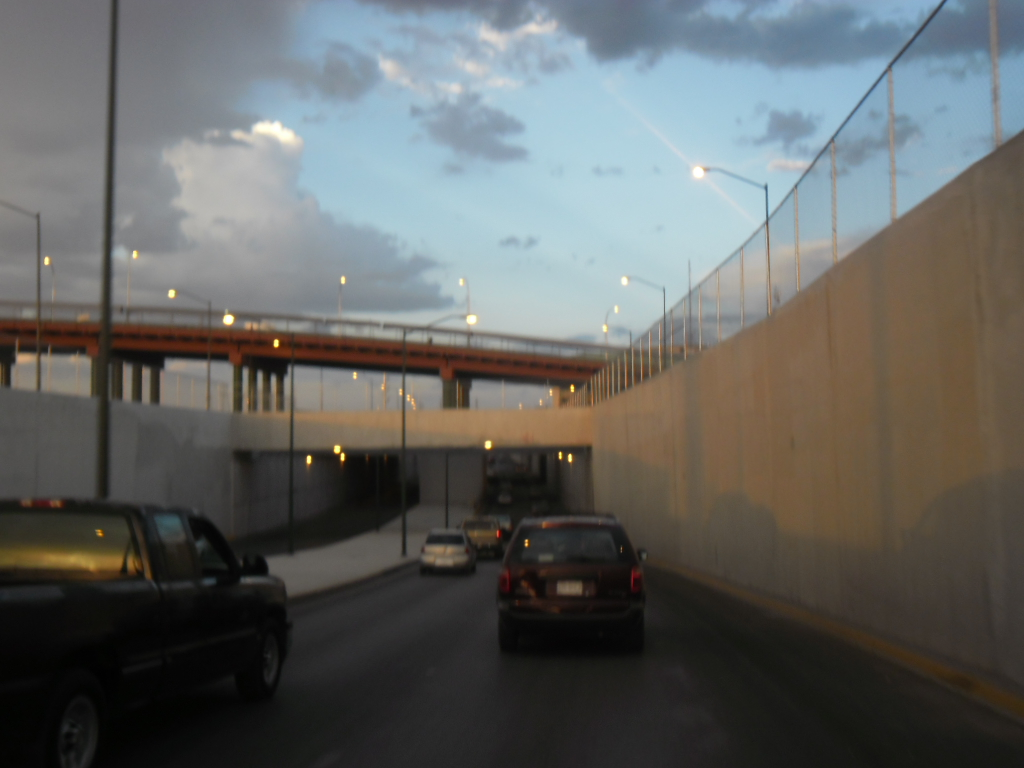
Tunnel below the Paso Del Norte Bridge

- Las Cruces International Airport

==== International border crossings ====
The first bridge to cross the Rio Grande at El Paso del Norte was built in the time of Nueva España, over 250 years ago, from wood hauled in from Santa Fe. Today, this bridge is honored by the modern Santa Fe Street Bridge, and Santa Fe Street in downtown El Paso.

Several bridges serve the El Paso–Ciudad Juárez area in addition to the Paso Del Norte Bridge also known as the Santa Fe Street Bridge, including the Bridge of the Americas, Stanton Street Bridge, and the Ysleta Bridge also known as the Zaragoza Bridge.

There is also a land crossing at nearby Santa Teresa, New Mexico, and the Fabens-Caseta International Bridge in nearby Fabens, Texas.

== Gallery ==
=== Pictures of El Paso, Texas ===
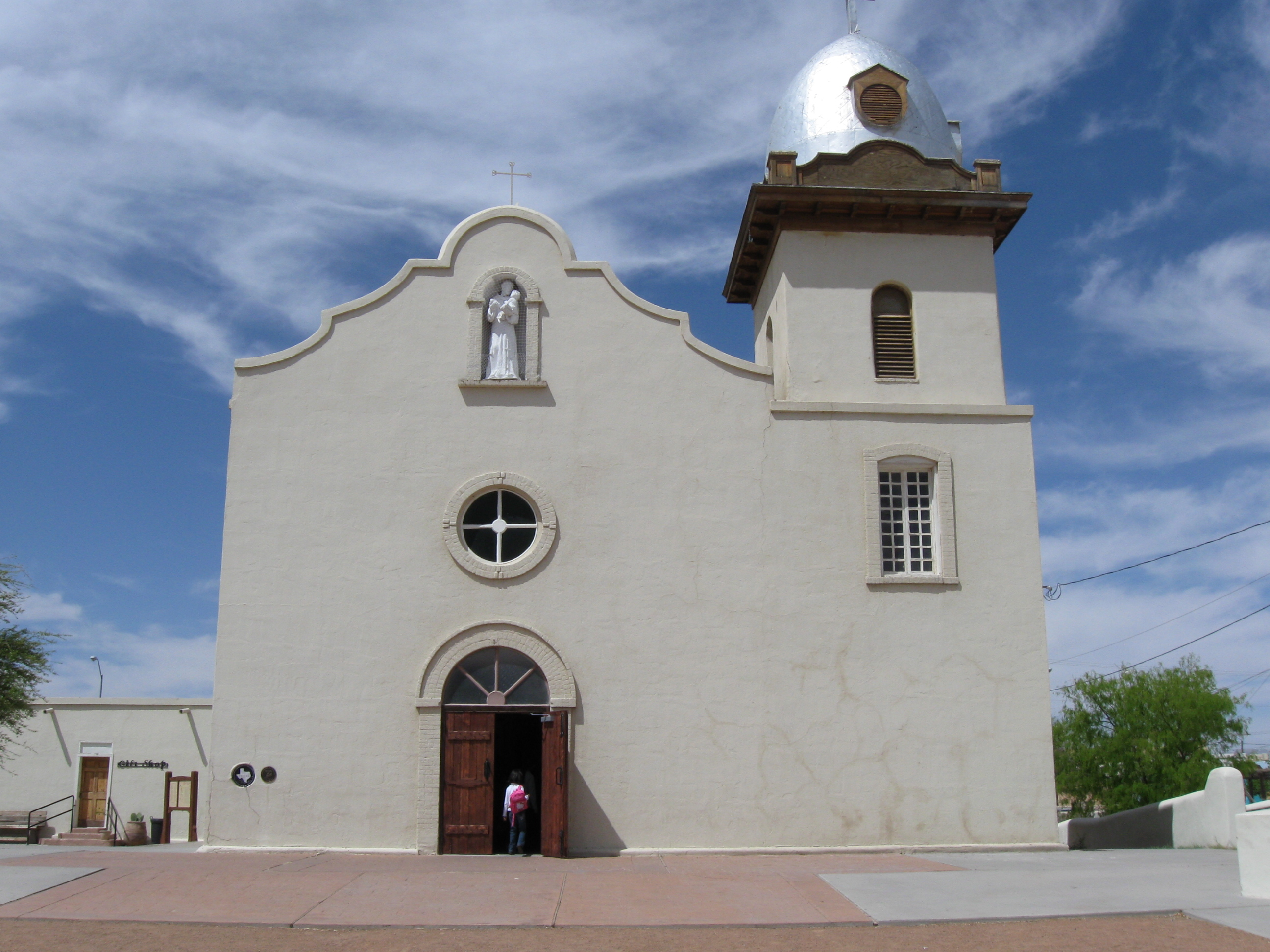
Ysleta Mission constructed in 1680 by the Spanish

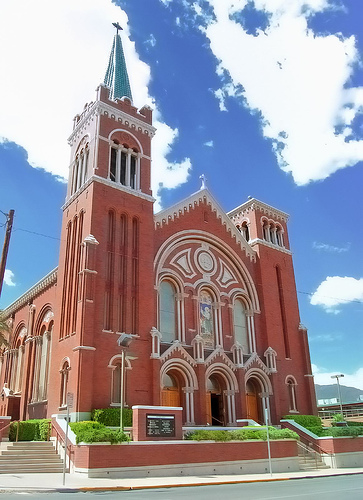
The Cathedral of Saint Patrick built in 1916

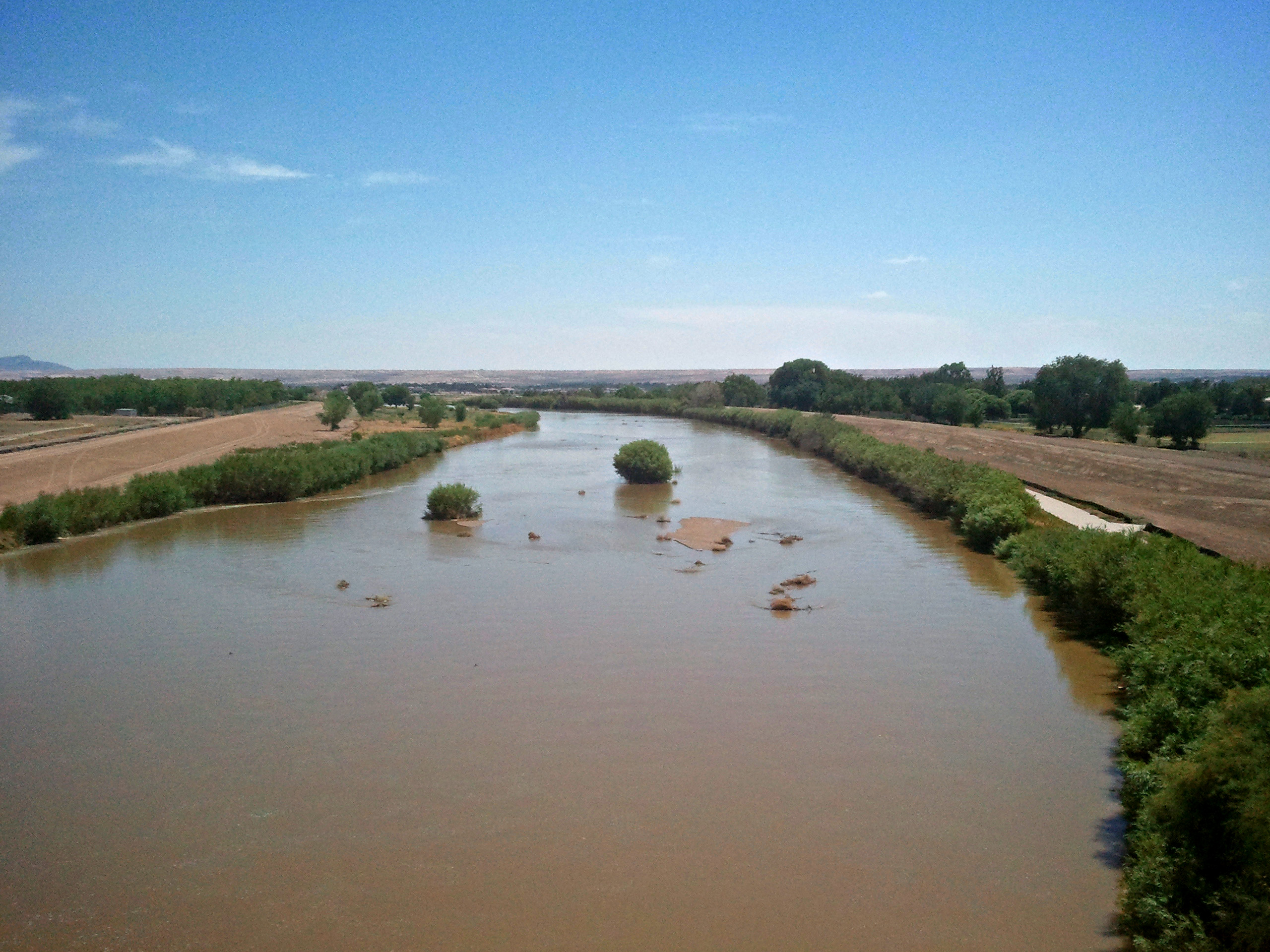
Rio Grande in El Paso's upper valley

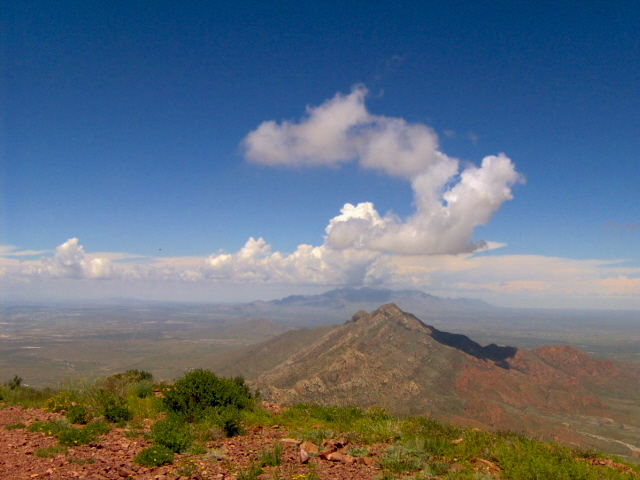
North Franklin Mountain

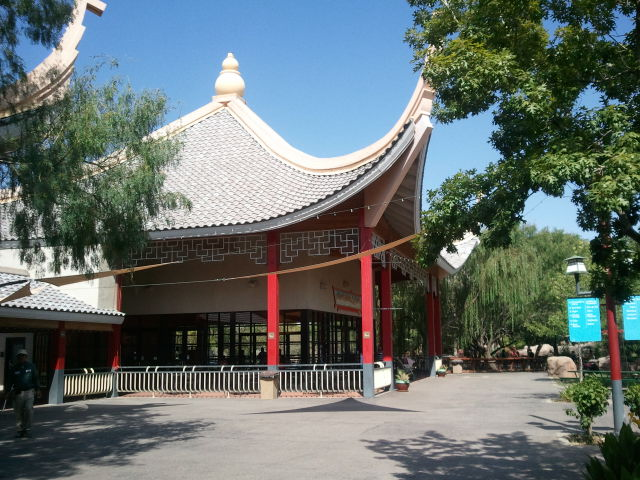
Asia exhibit entrance at the El Paso Zoo

=== Pictures of Cd. Juárez, Chihuahua ===
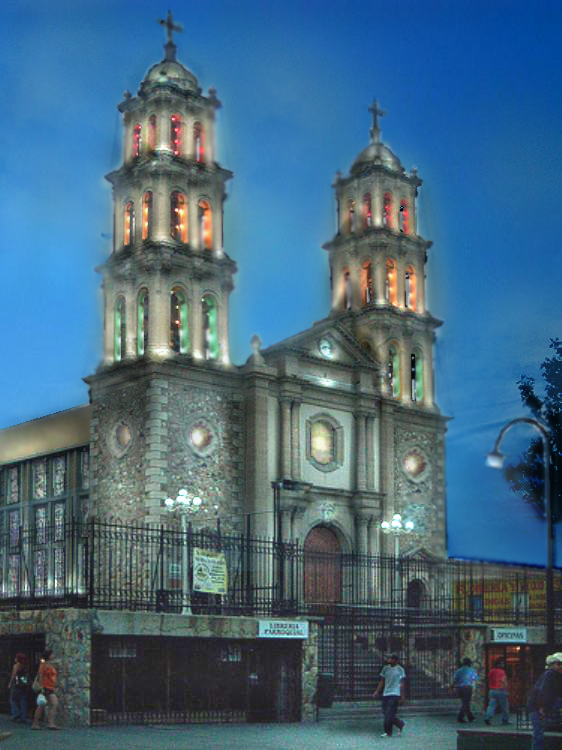
Juárez mission and cathedral at night, constructed by the Spanish in 1659

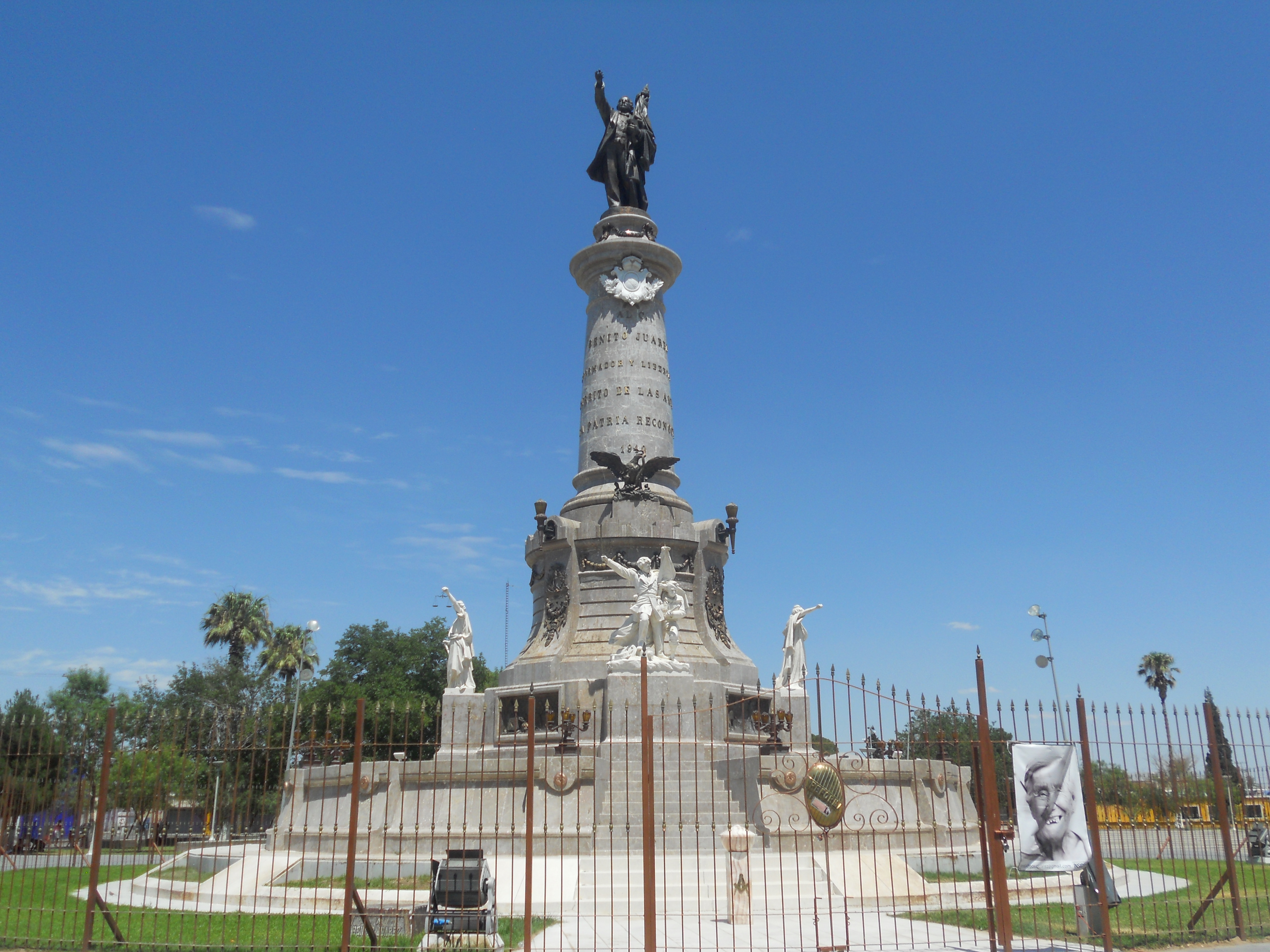
Benito Juárez monument located in central Juárez

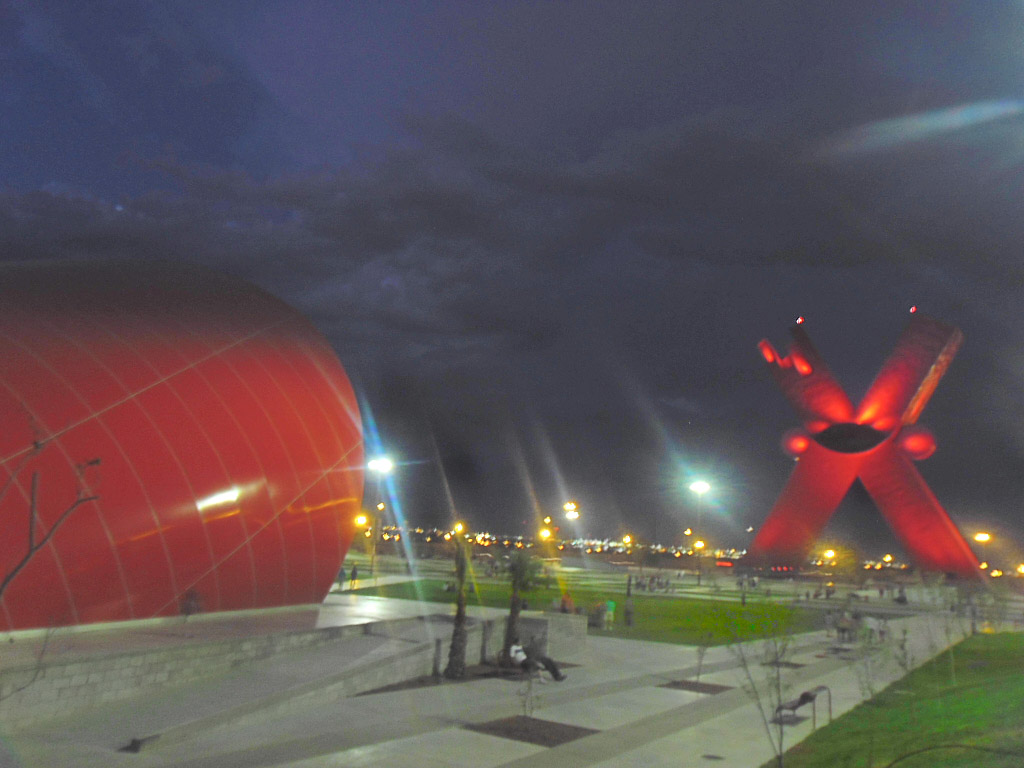
View of the Plaza De La Mexicanidad in north central Juárez

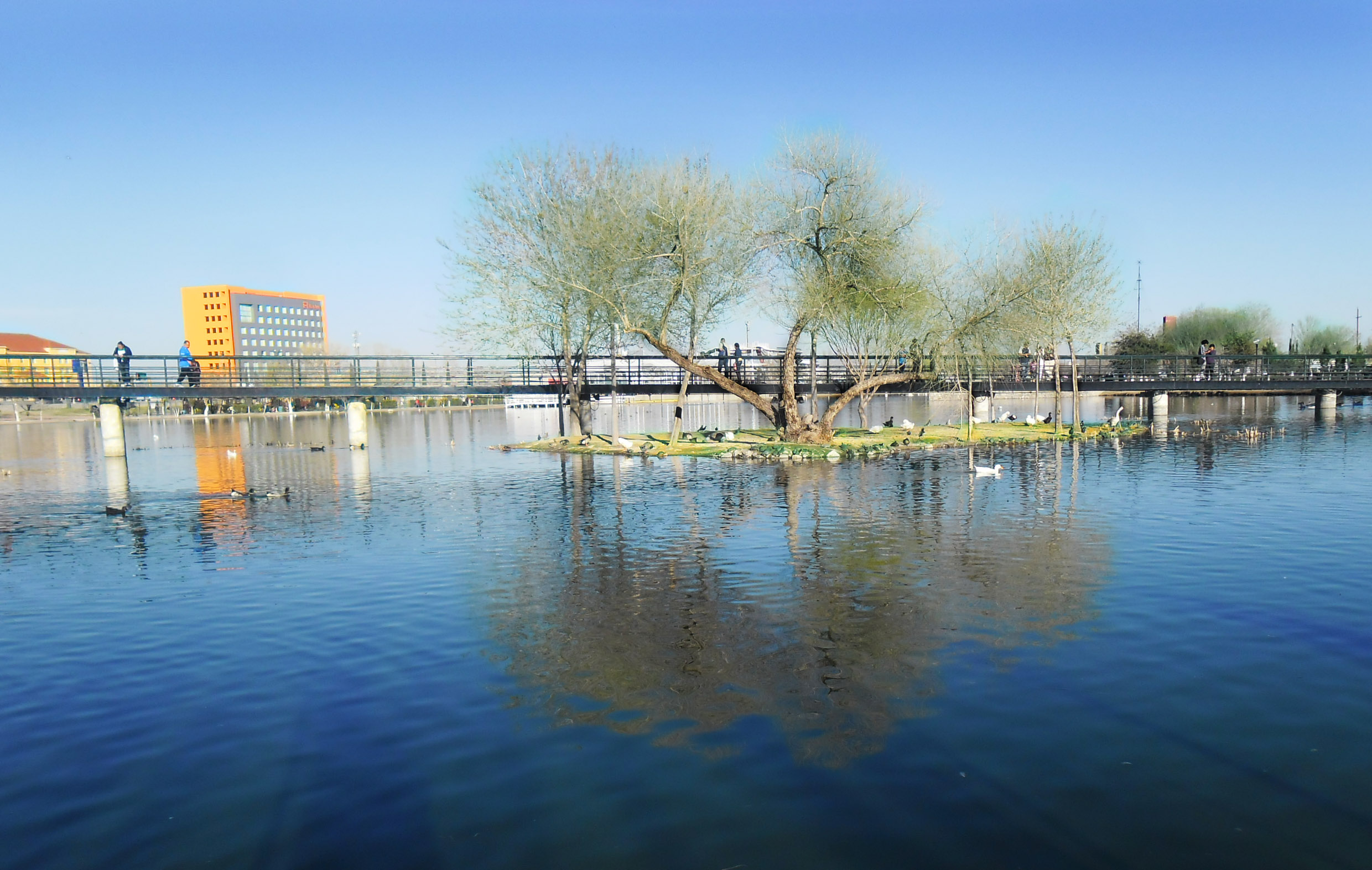
Lake view from Parque Central

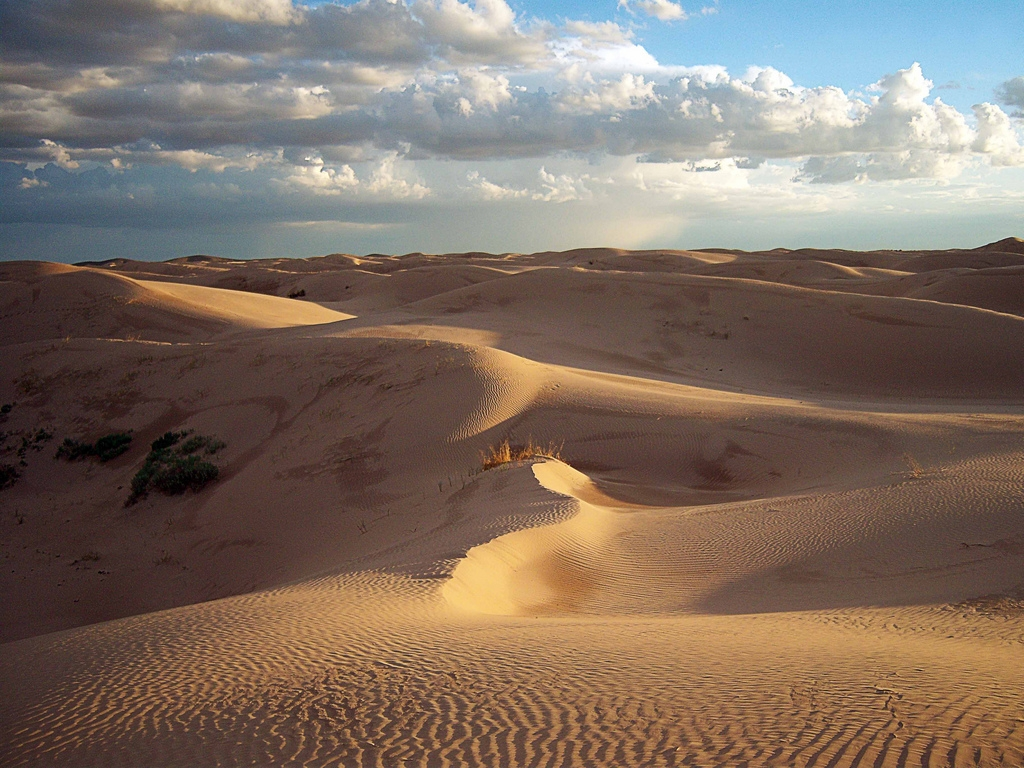
Sand dunes of Samalayuca

== See also ==
- Metropolitan areas of Mexico § Transnational conurbations
- Transborder agglomeration
- San Diego–Tijuana
- Laredo-Nuevo Laredo
- Reynosa–McAllen Metropolitan Area
- Matamoros–Brownsville Metropolitan Area
