= Interstate 110 (Texas) =

Interstate Highway in Texas

Interstate 110
- I-110 highlighted in red

Route information
- Auxiliary route of I-10
- Maintained by TxDOT
- Length: 0.92 mi (1,480 m)
- Existed: April 1, 1967–present
- NHS: Entire route

Major junctions
- South end: Fed. 45 at the Mexican border in El Paso
- US 62 in El Paso; US 54 in El Paso
- North end: I-10 / US 180 in El Paso

Location
- Country: United States
- State: Texas
- Counties: El Paso

Highway system
- Interstate Highway System; Main; Auxiliary; Suffixed; Business; Future; Highways in Texas; Interstate; US; State; Former; Toll; Loops; Spurs; FM/RM; Park; Rec
← SH 109	→ SH 110

Interstate 110 (I-110 (Note: Some sources use "IH-110", as "IH" is an abbreviation used by TxDOT for Interstate Highways.)) is a 0.92-mile (1.48 km) auxiliary Interstate Highway in El Paso, Texas, extending from I-10 south along U.S. Highway 54 (US 54), then turning west, and finally turning south into Mexico. I-110 provides access from I-10 to the Bridge of the Americas, which spans the Rio Grande to connect with Avenida Abraham Lincoln in Ciudad Juárez, Mexico. I-110 is currently the only auxiliary Interstate to connect directly with Mexico, and one of only two to connect to an international border, the other being I-190 in New York connecting to Canada. (In the future, Interstate 905 will be added.)

== Route description ==
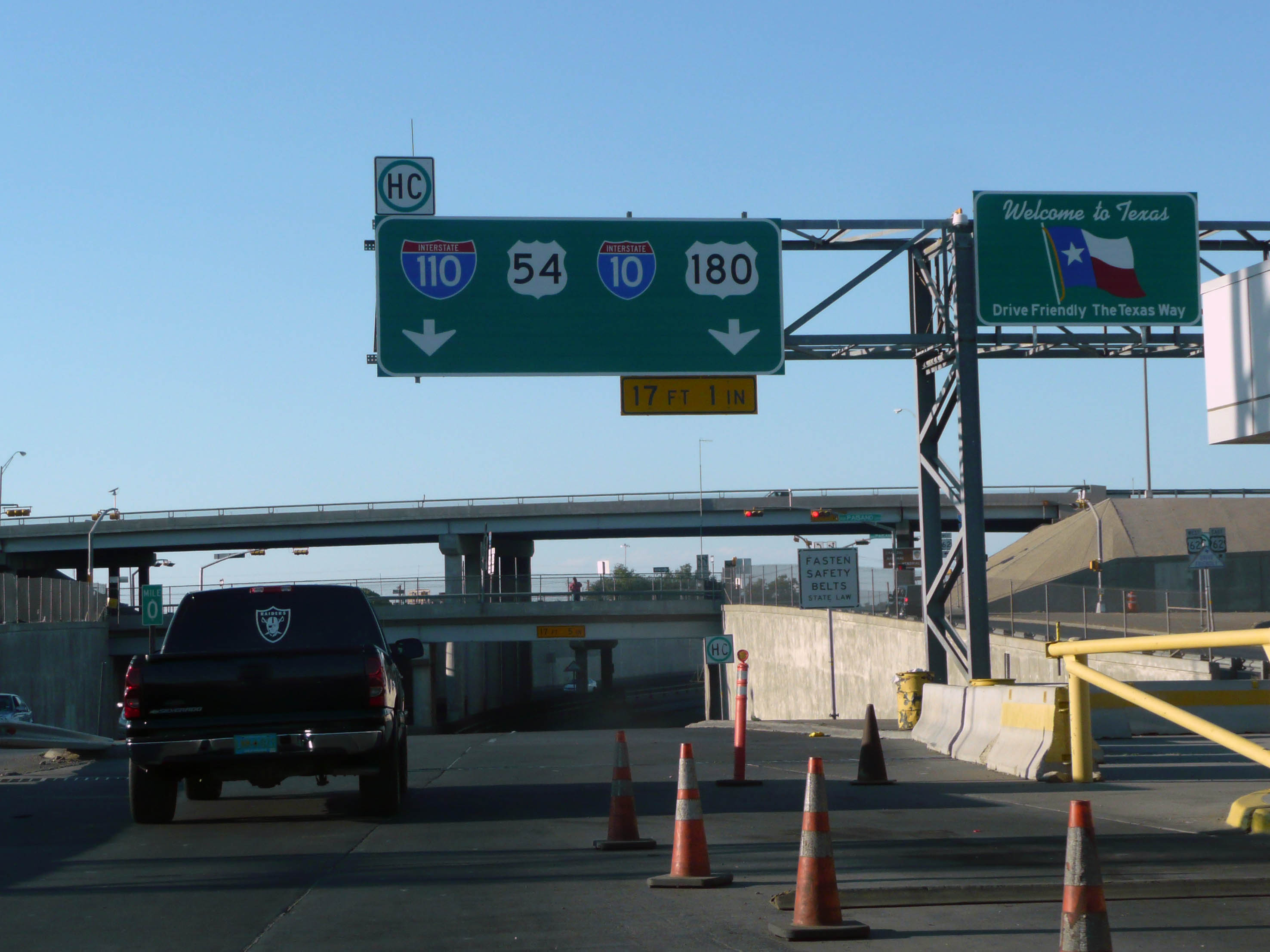
I-110 northbound at its southern terminus

The highway begins at its southern terminus, the beginning of the Bridge of the Americas, which spans the Rio Grande and connects to Federal Highway 45. The route proceeds north, crossing over all six lanes of Loop 375 (Cesar E. Chavez Border Highway) and divided Delta Drive. Immediately after passing over Delta Drive, the highway's truck lanes split off and pass through a specialized customs area. The roadway's mainlanes proceed northward through the El Paso BOTA Port of Entry, where each vehicle is searched by the U.S. Border Patrol. The route continues north, traveling parallel to Chamizal National Memorial, before splitting off and reaching an interchange with US 62 (East Paisano Drive). The road bends eastward, traveling past several houses and businesses, before it reaches an incomplete interchange with US 54 (Patriot Freeway). From the interchange, I-110 proceeds north as a complex series of three-level entrance and exit ramps, unofficially referred to as the "Spaghetti Bowl". The ramps merge into US 54, and the roadway continues concurrently with it, passing over Lincoln Park before reaching its northern terminus, an interchange with I-10. US 54 continues northward from the interchange.

The Texas Department of Transportation (TxDOT) lists I-110's official length as being 0.891 miles (1.434 km), while the Federal Highway Administration (FHWA) lists it as being 0.92 miles (1.48 km). I-110 is the shortest Interstate in Texas. The Interstate is almost entirely unsigned; the only signage showing its existence is on two overhead signs just beyond the El Paso BOTA Port of Entry going northbound.

== History ==
I-110 was officially designated as a route from I-10 to the Bridge of the Americas in 1967. The interchange at US 62 was completed in 1970. By 1972, the interchange at US 54 had been completed. The overpass at State Highway 20 (SH 20) and the interchange at I-10 were completed in 1973. I-110 underwent extensive construction through the late 2010s and early 2020s as part of the I-10 Connect project. As part of the construction project, the exit from US 62 to I-110 was removed and direct connector ramps were constructed between the Interstate and its parent route, providing a direct connection between I-10 and the Bridge of the Americas.

== Exit list ==
The entire route is in El Paso, El Paso County.

mi	km	Exit	Destinations	Notes
0.000	0.000		Fed. 45 south – Ciudad Juárez	Bridge of the Americas over the Rio Grande; continues south as Mexican Federal Highway 45
0.322– 0.451	0.518– 0.726	—	US 62 (Paisano Drive)	Northbound exit only
		—	US 54 east (Patriot Freeway) to I-10 / US 180 west – Alamogordo, Downtown, Las Cruces	Former northbound left exit and southbound left entrance; US 54 former exit 20B
0.891	1.434	21A	I-10 / US 180 east – Van Horn, San Antonio	Northern terminus of I-110; I-10 exit 22B
1.000 mi = 1.609 km; 1.000 km = 0.621 mi: Closed/former; Incomplete access
