= Texas State Highway Spur 327 =

Road in Texas

State Highway Spur 327

Route information
- Maintained by TxDOT
- Length: 2.13 mi (3.43 km)
- Existed: 1957–present

Major junctions
- West end: US 62 / US 82 in Lubbock
- East end: Loop 289 in Lubbock

Location
- Country: United States
- State: Texas

Highway system
- Highways in Texas; Interstate; US; State; Former; Toll; Loops; Spurs; FM/RM; Park; Rec
← Spur 326	→ Spur 328

Spur 327 is a short freeway located in the southwestern part of Lubbock, Texas. The highway connects U.S. Highway 62/U.S. Highway 82 (US 62/US 82, Marsha Sharp Freeway) to Loop 289.

== Route description ==
Spur 327 begins at an incomplete interchange with US 62/US 82 (Marsha Sharp Freeway) in southwest Lubbock. The highway has an exit with Milwaukee Avenue, then passes over Frankford Avenue without any direct access. Spur 327 ends at an interchange with Loop 289 just west of Slide Road.

== History ==
Spur 327 originally opened to traffic on October 30, 1957, and its original routing has not changed since then. The Texas Department of Transportation (TxDOT) began upgrading it to a freeway in early 2015, with overhead signs placed in early August. The freeway upgrade is part of phase 5A of the Marsha Sharp Freeway extension to Wolfforth.

== Exit list ==
The entire route is in Lubbock, Lubbock County.

mi	km	Destinations	Notes
0.0	0.0	US 62 west / US 82 west (Marsha Sharp Freeway) – Brownfield	Westbound exit and eastbound entrance
0.2	0.32	US 62 east / US 82 east / Milwaukee Avenue	
1.4	2.3	Frankford Avenue	
1.5	2.4	Slide Road	Eastbound exit and westbound entrance
2.1	3.4	Loop 289 east	Eastbound exit and westbound entrance
1.000 mi = 1.609 km; 1.000 km = 0.621 mi: Incomplete access
