= U.S. Route 62 in Texas =

Highway in Texas

U.S. Highway 62
- US 62 highlighted in red

Route information
- Maintained by TxDOT
- Length: 403.744 mi (649.763 km)
- Existed: 1932–present

West Texas
- West end: US 85 at the Mexican border in El Paso
- Major intersections: I-110 in El Paso; US 54 in El Paso; I-10 / US 180 in El Paso
- East end: US 62 / US 180 at New Mexico state line northwest of Pine Springs

South Plains
- West end: US 62 / US 180 at New Mexico state line west of Seminole
- Major intersections: I-27 / US 87 in Lubbock
- East end: US 62 at Oklahoma state line near Hollis

Location
- Country: United States
- State: Texas
- Counties: El Paso, Hudspeth, Culberson; Gaines, Terry, Hockley, Lubbock, Crosby, Floyd, Motley, Cottle, Childress

Highway system
- United States Numbered Highway System; List; Special; Divided; Highways in Texas; Interstate; US; State; Former; Toll; Loops; Spurs; FM/RM; Park; Rec
← SH 61	→ SH 62

U.S. Route 62 (US 62) is a US highway that runs from the Mexico–US border at El Paso, TX to the Canada-US border at Niagara Falls, NY. In Texas, the highway exists in two segments separated by a segment in New Mexico. US 62 is a major corridor in West Texas as it connects the cities of El Paso and Lubbock.

== Route description ==
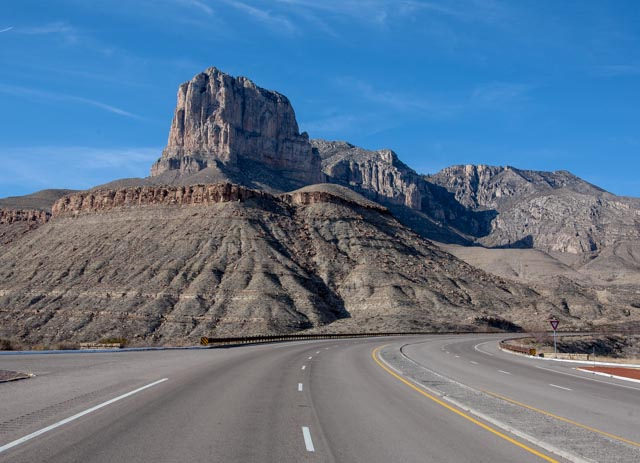
El Capitan as seen from US 62 in Guadalupe Mountains National Park

=== Trans-Pecos ===
US 62 begins at the Santa Fe Street Bridge at the Mexico–US border in El Paso concurrent with U.S. Route 85. US 62 ends its overlap with US 85 and runs along E. Paisano Drive through Downtown El Paso. The highway runs northeast and passes by the Chamizal National Memorial before interchanging with Interstate 110 and U.S. Route 54. US 62 continues to run along E. Paisano Drive and has a short overlap with State Highway 20, which both enters and leaves via a traffic circle. The highway meets Interstate 10, where it begins an overlap with U.S. Route 180. Just north of I-10, US 62/180 leave E. Paisano Drive and begin to run along Montana Avenue, passing just south of El Paso International Airport. The section of Montana Avenue from Global Reach Drive/N. Yarbrough Drive to Rich Beem Boulevard runs along the reservation line to Fort Bliss. Development begins to steadily decrease along the highway east of Loop 375 as US 62 runs through the communities of Homestead Meadows North/Homestead Meadows South, Butterfield, and Montana Vista. After leaving El Paso County, the highway runs through sparsely populated areas and the town of Pine Springs near Guadalupe Mountains National Park. The highway winds through the Guadalupe Mountains before crossing into New Mexico.

=== South Plains ===
US 62/180 reenters Texas from New Mexico between Hobbs and Seminole. US 62 ends its overlap with US 180 in Seminole and begins an overlap with U.S. Route 385. The two highways run north-northeast through the towns of Seagraves and Wellman before entering Brownfield. In Brownfield, US 62 has a short overlap with U.S. Route 380 and State Highway 137 and begins an overlap with U.S. Route 82. US 385 leaves the concurrency in the northern part of the town. US 62/82 run through the towns of Meadow and Ropesville before entering metro Lubbock and the town of Wolfforth. The highway bypasses the town as a freeway and enters Lubbock near the 82nd Street exit. US 62/82 becomes a divided highway between 82nd Street and Spur 327 before becoming a freeway again, which is known locally as the Marsha Sharp Freeway. US 62 runs along the Marsha Sharp Freeway through a heavily developed area of southwest Lubbock before leaving US 82 at State Highway 114. US 62/SH 114 run through the heart of the city on 19th Street before becoming Idalou Road at Martin Luther King, Jr. Boulevard. The highway rejoins US 82 near the East Loop 289 interchange. The highways run northeast out of the city before turning in a predominantly east direction in Idalou.

US 62 leaves US 82/SH 114 in Ralls before beginning a concurrency with State Highway 207. The highway's concurrency with SH 207 ends in Floydada, with US 62 beginning an overlap with U.S. Route 70. US 62 has a lengthy overlap with US 70 that lasts from Floydada to Paducah. In Paducah, US 62 begins an overlap with U.S. Route 83, with the two highways running through Childress. US 62 ends its overlap with US 83 just north of the Prairie Dog Town Fork Red River and exits the state into Oklahoma a few miles west of Hollis.

== History ==
The section of US 62 in far west Texas, from El Paso to SH 54, was originally designated as SH 130. The highway was designated on January 18, 1928. In 1932, SH 130 was co-designated as part of US 62. The highway was extended to the New Mexico state line in 1936, replacing a portion of SH 54. The SH 130 designation was removed in 1939. US 180 was routed along this section of US 62 in 1943.

== Junction list ==
County	Location	mi	km	Exit	Destinations	Notes
El Paso	El Paso	0.00	0.00		Stanton Street Bridge	Mexican border; west end of US 85 overlap, Western terminus of US 62, Southern terminus of US 85
El Paso	El Paso	0.5	0.80		US 85 north (Paisano Drive)	East end of US 85 overlap
El Paso	El Paso	1.4	2.3		Loop 375 east	Interchange; eastbound exit and westbound entrance; Loop 375 exit 59
El Paso	El Paso				I-110 (Bridge of the Americas) – Juárez	Access to I-110 removed in 2020
El Paso	El Paso	3.2	5.1		US 54 east (Gateway Boulevard) / Loop 375 east	US 54 exit 20A
El Paso	El Paso	4.4	7.1		SH 20 west	Traffic circle; west end of SH 20 overlap
El Paso	El Paso	4.5	7.2		SH 20 east	Traffic circle; east end of SH 20 overlap
El Paso	El Paso	5.2	8.4		I-10 (Gateway East West Boulevard) / US 180 west	West end of US 180 overlap; I-10 exit 23B
El Paso	El Paso	9.4	15.1		FM 2316 south (McRae Boulevard)	
El Paso	El Paso			28	Global Reach Drive / Yarbrough Drive	West end of freeway; westbound exit and eastbound entrance
El Paso	El Paso			29	Lee Trevino Drive	Westbound exit and eastbound entrance
El Paso	El Paso			30	George Dieter Drive	Eastbound exit and westbound entrance
El Paso	El Paso			31	Lee Boulevard / Saul Klenfield Drive	Eastbound exit and westbound entrance; current east end of freeway
El Paso	El Paso	14.6	23.5	32	Loop 375 (Joe Battle Boulevard / Purple Heart Memorial Highway)	Loop 375 exit 35
El Paso	El Paso			33	Tierra Este Road	Planned future interchange
El Paso	El Paso			34	Rich Beem Boulevard	Planned future interchange
El Paso	El Paso	17.6	28.3		FM 659 south (Zaragoza Road)	Interchange; future east end of Montana Avenue Expressway
El Paso		26.8	43.1		RM 2775 north – Hueco Tanks State Historic Site	
Hudspeth	Cornudas	62.8	101.1		RM 2317 south	
Hudspeth		69.6	112.0		RM 1111 south – Sierra Blanca	
Hudspeth		79.6	128.1		FM 1437 north – Dell City	
Hudspeth	Salt Flat	87.1	140.2		FM 1576 north – Dell City	
Culberson		101.2	162.9		SH 54 south – Van Horn	
Culberson		129.0	207.6		RM 652 east – Orla	
Culberson		129.1	207.8		US 62 east / US 180 east – Carlsbad	New Mexico state line
US 62 crosses through New Mexico
Gaines		0.00	0.00		US 62 west / US 180 west – Hobbs	New Mexico state line
Gaines		3.0	4.8		FM 3306 north	
Gaines		15.7	25.3		FM 1757 west	
Gaines	Seminole	24.1	38.8		SH 214 north – Denver City, Plains	
Gaines	Seminole	24.5	39.4		US 180 east / US 385 south	East end of US 180 overlap; west end of US 385 overlap
Gaines	Seagraves	42.0	67.6		SH 83 – Denver City, Welch	
Terry	Wellman	52.5	84.5		FM 213 / FM 303 south	South end of FM 303 overlap
Terry		56.6	91.1		FM 303 north	North end of FM 303 overlap
Terry	Brownfield	63.6	102.4		SH 137 north / FM 403 south – Levelland	West end of SH 137 overlap
Terry	Brownfield	63.8	102.7		SH 137 south – Lamesa	East end of SH 137 overlap
Terry	Brownfield	65.3	105.1		US 82 west / US 380 west – Plains	West end of US 82/380 overlap
Terry	Brownfield	65.4	105.3		US 380 east (Tahoka Road) – Terry County Airport	East end of US 380 overlap
Terry	Brownfield	66.3	106.7		US 385 north – Levelland	East end of US 385 overlap
Terry	Brownfield	66.4	106.9		FM 2066 north	
Terry		69.6	112.0		FM 1698 east	
Terry	Meadow	76.2	122.6		FM 211 – New Home	
Hockley	Ropesville	82.8	133.3		FM 41 / FM 168	
Lubbock		89.8	144.5		FM 1585 east	West end of FM 1585 overlap
Lubbock		91.5	147.3		FM 1585 west	East end of FM 1585 overlap
Lubbock	Wolfforth	92.3	148.5		Loop 193 – Wolfforth	Interchange; west end of freeway
Lubbock	Wolfforth	92.8	149.3		FM 179 – Wolfforth	
Lubbock	Wolfforth	94.4	151.9		Frontage Road	Eastbound exit only
Lubbock	Wolfforth	94.8	152.6		Loop 193 / 82nd Street – Wolfforth	
Lubbock	Lubbock	95.7	154.0		Upland Avenue	
Lubbock	Lubbock	96.8	155.8		Spur 327 east	Eastbound exit and westbound entrance
Lubbock	Lubbock	97.3	156.6		Milwaukee Avenue	
Lubbock	Lubbock	98.5	158.5		Loop 289	
Lubbock	Lubbock	99.6	160.3		34th Street / Slide Road	
Lubbock	Lubbock	101.1	162.7		Quaker Avenue	
Lubbock	Lubbock	101.4– 102.0	163.2– 164.2		US 82 east / SH 114 west	East end of US 82 overlap; west end of SH 114 overlap; east end of freeway
Lubbock	Lubbock	104.5	168.2		US 84 (Avenue Q)	
Lubbock	Lubbock	105.3	169.5		I-27 / US 87	I-27 exit 3
Lubbock	Lubbock	108.3– 108.7	174.3– 174.9		US 82 west (Parkway Drive) / Loop 289	Interchange; west end of US 82 overlap
Lubbock		112.2	180.6		FM 2641 west – Preston Smith International Airport	
Lubbock		113.5	182.7		FM 1729 south – Buffalo Springs Lake, Ransom Canyon	West end of FM 1729 overlap
Lubbock		114.6	184.4		FM 1729 north – New Deal	East end of FM 1729 overlap
Lubbock		117.6	189.3		FM 400 – Plainview, Slaton	
Lubbock		120.6	194.1		FM 789 south – Acuff	West end of FM 789 overlap
Lubbock		121.6	195.7		FM 789 north – Petersburg	East end of FM 789 overlap
Crosby	Lorenzo	125.1	201.3		FM 378 north – Lockney	West end of FM 378 overlap
Crosby	Lorenzo	125.6	202.1		FM 378 south	East end of FM 378 overlap
Crosby		129.0	207.6		FM 2236 north	
Crosby		131.0	210.8		FM 2576 south	
Crosby	Ralls	133.0	214.0		US 82 east / SH 114 east – Crosbyton	East end of US 82/SH 114 overlap
Crosby	Ralls	134.1	215.8		SH 207 south – Post	South end of SH 207 overlap
Crosby		137.8	221.8		FM 1471	
Crosby	Cone	141.7	228.0		FM 193 – McAdoo	
Floyd		147.0	236.6		FM 54 west – Petersburg	
Floyd		151.5	243.8		FM 37 west – Fieldton	
Floyd	Floydada	155.0	249.4		US 70 west – Plainview	West end of US 70 overlap
Floyd	Floydada	155.9	250.9		SH 207 north / FM 1958 east – Silverton	East end of SH 207 overlap
Floyd		159.9	257.3		FM 651 – Crosbyton	
Floyd		162.9	262.2		FM 602 south	
Floyd		168.9	271.8		FM 28 south – Dougherty	West end of FM 28 overlap
Floyd		169.9	273.4		FM 28 north	East end of FM 28 overlap
Motley	Matador	185.7	298.9		SH 70 – Turkey, Dickens	
Motley	Matador	186.0	299.3		FM Spur 94 north (Main Street)	
Motley	Matador	186.4	300.0		Spur 196 west	
Motley		188.8	303.8		FM 1380	
Cottle		212.4	341.8		FM 1037	
Cottle	Paducah	217.2	349.5		US 70 east / US 83 south – Guthrie, Crowell	East end of US 70 overlap; west end of US 83 overlap
Cottle	Paducah	217.3	349.7		FM 1037 east (Backus Street)	West end of FM 1037 overlap
Cottle	Paducah	217.5	350.0		FM 1037 south	East end of FM 1037 overlap
Cottle	Paducah	217.7	350.4		FM 2876 east – Quanah	
Cottle		223.5	359.7		FM 2998 north	
Cottle		224.5	361.3		FM 3256 west – Matador Wildlife Management Area	
Cottle		226.1	363.9		FM 2998 south	
Cottle		232.2	373.7		FM 1440 west – Cee Vee	
Childress		241.1	388.0		FM 2103 west	
Childress		243.5	391.9		FM 94 south – Tell, Matador	
Childress	Childress	246.0	395.9		FM 2042	
Childress	Childress	257.2	413.9		FM 164 – Childress Municipal Airport	
Childress	Childress	247.9	399.0		US 287 – Memphis, Quanah	
Childress	Childress	248.7	400.2		FM 3181 east	
Childress		255.4	411.0		FM 2465	
Childress		257.2– 257.5	413.9– 414.4	Bridge over Prairie Dog Town Fork Red River		
Childress		264.4	425.5		US 83 north – Wellington	East end of US 83 overlap
Childress		266.4	428.7		FM 1438 north	
Childress		273.6	440.3		FM 1642 north – Dodson	
Childress		275.3	443.1		US 62 east – Hollis	Oklahoma state line
1.000 mi = 1.609 km; 1.000 km = 0.621 mi: Concurrency terminus; Closed/former; Incomplete access

U.S. Route 62
Previous state: Terminus	Texas	Next state: New Mexico

U.S. Route 62
Previous state: New Mexico	Texas	Next state: Oklahoma
