= U.S. Route 54 in Texas =

Section of U.S. Highway in Texas

U.S. Highway 54
- US 54 highlighted in red

Route information
- Maintained by TxDOT
- Length: 111.583 mi (179.575 km)
- Existed: 1927–present

Trans-Pecos section
- South end: Loop 375 in El Paso
- Major intersections: I-110 in El Paso; US 62 in El Paso; I-10 / US 180 in El Paso
- North end: US 54 at Chaparral, NM

Panhandle section
- South end: US 54 near Nara Visa, NM
- Major intersections: US 87 / US 385 in Dalhart; US 287 in Stratford
- North end: US 54 at Texhoma, OK

Location
- Country: United States
- State: Texas
- Counties: El Paso; Hartley, Dallam, Sherman

Highway system
- United States Numbered Highway System; List; Special; Divided; Highways in Texas; Interstate; US; State; Former; Toll; Loops; Spurs; FM/RM; Park; Rec
← SH 53	→ SH 54

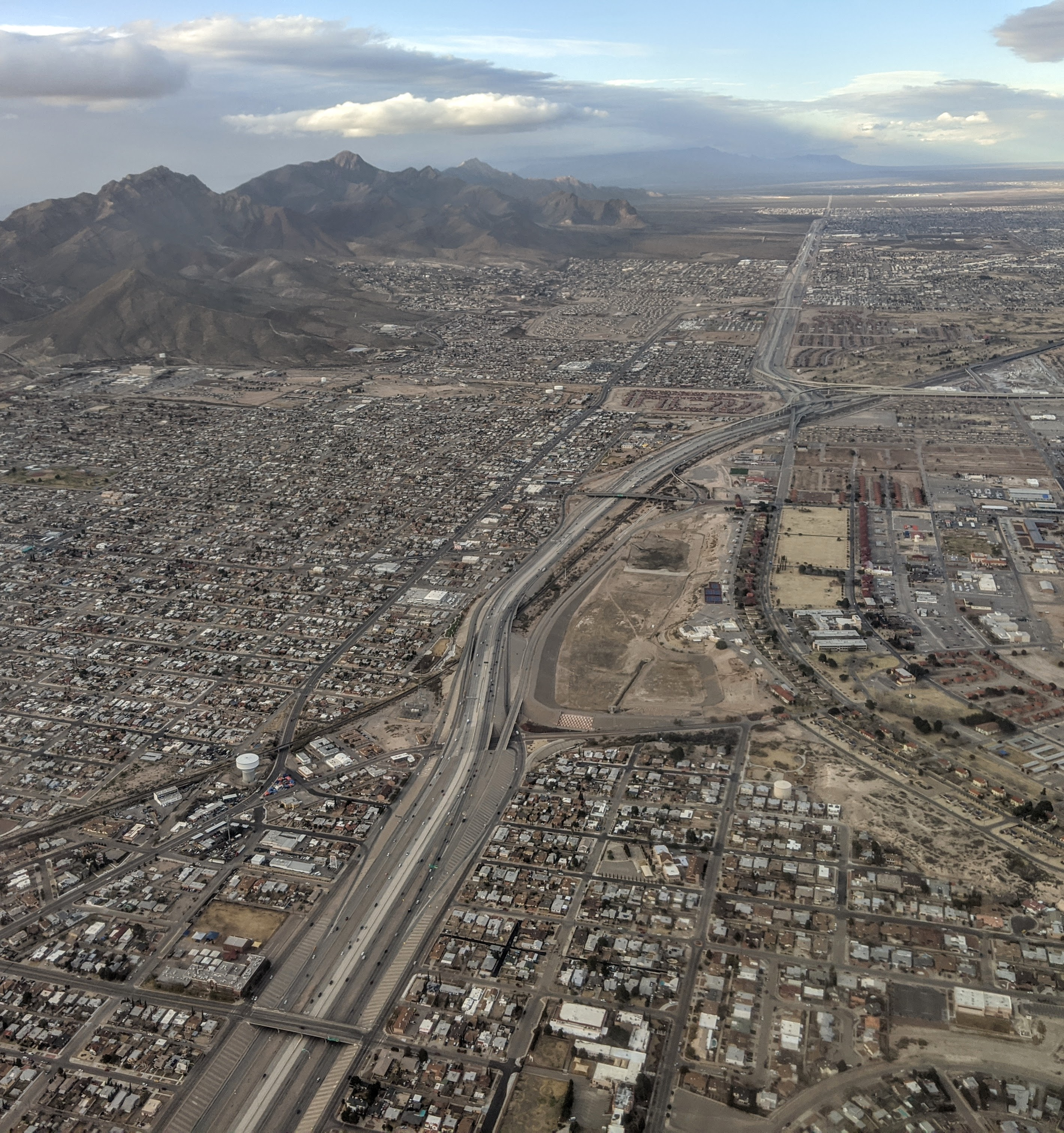
US Highway 54 in El Paso, aerial view from above the Mexico–United States border. The old route of the highway, now Bus. US 54-A, El Paso's Dyer Street, is visible just to the left of the North–South Freeway, as Highway 54 is also known in El Paso.

U.S. Route 54 (US 54) in Texas is a U.S. Highway that travels through two portions of the state: one in the far western point, and the other in the far northwest Panhandle.

== Route description ==
US 54 begins in El Paso, Texas, as a controlled access highway at an intersection with Loop 375. The route then travels northward, joining up with I-110 within the first mile. A mile later, these highways intersect Interstate 10 at a complex, three level high expressway interchange which the locals call the "Spaghetti Bowl." I-110 ends here, while US 54 continues north through El Paso. The route turns northeast, becoming a rare example of a collector–express freeway in Texas (until the Pershing Drive exit) before entering New Mexico. The route re-enters Texas in the northwest Panhandle, traveling northeast through sparsely populated country. The route intersects US Route 87 and US Route 385 in Dalhart and US Route 287 in Stratford, before exiting into the Oklahoma Panhandle at Texhoma.

== History ==
The southwestern portion was originally part of the Ozark Trails, paralleling the El Paso and Southwestern Railroad, and was originally given the numbering of State Highway 33. SH 33 continued into Texas farther south in the Panhandle, following the former Ozark Trail. The northern Panhandle portion was originally assigned to State Highway 56, paralleling the Chicago, Rock Island, and Gulf Railroad.

When the U.S. Highway System was unveiled in 1926, the northern section was assigned to U.S. Highway 54, while the southwestern portion was assigned to U.S. Highway 366. The US 366 designation was canceled in 1932 when other sections of the highway were added to an adjusted US Route 70. This section was added to US 54 in 1934, and has retained its numbering since. By 1939, the corresponding state highway designations had been canceled.

The highway continues on its original routing except for realignment in 1990 in El Paso, with the old route becoming US Business Route 54 and Texas Loop 478. Most of the current US 54 in El Paso is a limited-access highway known as the Patriot Freeway which, as of 2016, was only partially completed.

== Future ==
US 54 from Haggerty Drive in northeast El Paso to the New Mexico state line is planned to eventually be upgraded to freeway status.

== Major intersections ==
County	Location	mi	km	Exit	Destinations	Notes
El Paso	El Paso	0.00	0.00	19	Loop 375 east	National western terminus of US 54; left exit; Loop 375 exit 58
El Paso	El Paso	0.00	0.00	20	Loop 375 west	Westbound exit and eastbound entrance
El Paso	El Paso	0.1	0.16	20A	US 62 (Paisano Drive)	Signed as exit 20 eastbound; no westbound entrance
El Paso	El Paso	0.2– 0.3	0.32– 0.48	20B	I-110 south – Juárez, México (Autos only)	Former westbound exit and eastbound entrance
El Paso	El Paso	0.4	0.64	21	I-10 / US 180 – Las Cruces, Downtown El Paso, Van Horn, San Antonio; Juárez, México – Port of Entry (via I-110 south)	Signed as exits 21A (east) and 21B (west); no exit 21A eastbound (I-10 east is signed at exit 20); no access from I-10 to US 54 west; I-10 exit 22B; westbound exit and eastbound entrance for I-110
El Paso	El Paso	1.3	2.1	21C	Montana Avenue	Signed as part of exit 21B eastbound
El Paso	El Paso	1.6	2.6	22A	Trowbridge Drive / Altura Drive	Eastbound exit and entrance
El Paso	El Paso	2.5	4.0	22B	Pershing Drive	Signed as exit 22 westbound
El Paso	El Paso	2.6	4.2	23	Cassidy Road – Fort Bliss	Signed as part of exit 22 westbound
El Paso	El Paso	3.7	6.0	24A	Fred Wilson Avenue / Broaddus Avenue / Railroad Drive	
El Paso	El Paso	4.4	7.1	24B	Spur 601 east – Airport	Spur 601 exit 20A
El Paso	El Paso	5.2	8.4	25	Ellerthorpe Avenue / Broaddus Avenue	
El Paso	El Paso	5.8	9.3	26	Bus. US 54 (Dyer Street) / Hercules Avenue	
El Paso	El Paso	7.3	11.7	27	Hondo Pass Drive	
El Paso	El Paso	7.8	12.6	28	Diana Drive	
El Paso	El Paso	8.7	14.0	29	Loop 375 (Woodrow Bean Transmountain Drive)	Loop 375 exit 21
El Paso	El Paso	9.7	15.6	30	Sun Valley Drive	No direct westbound exit (signed at exit 31)
El Paso	El Paso	11.0	17.7	31	FM 3255 north (MLK Jr. Boulevard) / Kenworthy Street	
El Paso	El Paso	12.5	20.1	32	Sean Haggerty Drive	Future interchange; temporary east end of freeway
El Paso	El Paso	13.6	21.9	33	FM 2529 (McCombs Street) – Chaparral	Future interchange; future east end of freeway
El Paso	El Paso	14.4	23.2	34	Spur 320 (Borderland Expressway)	Future interchange; future west end of freeway
El Paso	El Paso	16.2	26.1	35	Mesquite Hill Drive	Future interchange
El Paso	El Paso	18.5	29.8	37	Stan Roberts Sr Avenue	Future interchange; future east end of freeway
Texas–New Mexico line		20.0	32.2		Bus. US 54 south (Edge of Texas Street) / State Line Drive – Chaparral	
Texas–New Mexico line		20.0	32.2		US 54 north – Alamogordo	Continuation into New Mexico
US 54 crosses through New Mexico
Hartley		0.00	0.00		US 54 south – Nara Visa, Tucumcari	New Mexico–Texas line
Hartley		8.5	13.7		RM 3296 west	
Hartley		9.3	15.0		FM 767 east – Channing	
Hartley		35.2	56.6		FM 694 east	Counterclockwise terminus of FM 694
Hartley		37.5	60.4		FM 998 south – Hartley, TDCJ ID Dalhart Unit	
Hartley		38.0	61.2		FM 694 west	Clockwise terminus of FM 694
Hartley		39.0	62.8		FM 3139 south – Airport	
Dallam	Dalhart	40.8	65.7		Bus. US 87 south (7th Street east) – Amarillo	West end of US 87 Bus. overlap
Dallam	Dalhart	41.3	66.5		Bus. US 87 ends / US 87 / US 385 (Railroad Street) / FM 297 east (First Street) – Boise City, Clayton, Amarillo	Northern terminus of US 87 Bus.; east end of US 87 Bus. overlap; no access from FM 297 to US 54 west
Dallam		46.4	74.7		FM 695 east	Serves Miller Airfield
Dallam	Chamberlin	51.5	82.9		FM 3212 east	
Dallam	Conlen	59.8	96.2		FM 3213 west	
Dallam	Conlen	60.7	97.7		FM 807 south – Hartley	West end of FM 807 overlap
Dallam	Conlen	61.0	98.2		FM 807 north – Kerrick	East end of FM 807 overlap
Sherman		69.3	111.5		FM 2014 south	
Sherman	Stratford	72.3	116.4		US 287 (Poplar Street) – Boise City, Dumas	
Sherman	Stratford	72.5	116.7		SH 15 east (Main Street) – Gruver	
Sherman	Stratford	73.0	117.5		FM 2677 north	
Sherman		89.5	144.0		FM 119 south – Sunray	
Sherman	Texhoma	91.8	147.7		FM 1290 south	
Sherman	Texhoma	91.9	147.9		US 54 east (South Street) – Guymon, Liberal	Continuation into Texhoma, Oklahoma
1.000 mi = 1.609 km; 1.000 km = 0.621 mi: Concurrency terminus; Closed/former; Incomplete access; Proposed

== El Paso business loop ==
Business U.S. Highway 54-A
- Location: El Paso
- Length: 12.466 mi (20.062 km)
- Existed: 1990–present

Business U.S. Highway 54-A or Bus. US 54-A is a business route of US 54 at El Paso commissioned in 1990. The 12.5-mile (20.1 km) route begins at US 54 and State Highway Loop 478 at the Patriot Freeway. The route runs along Dyer Street through Northeast El Paso near Fort Bliss to its northern terminus at the New Mexico state line. Access to US 54 eastbound continues forward into New Mexico for 0.3 miles (0.5 km) over a local road not recognized by New Mexico as a state highway that becomes a one-way entrance ramp merging with US 54. Highway signs in New Mexico direct westbound US 54 traffic to turn left on Edge of Texas Street at the state line to access Bus. US 54-A.

Bus. US 54-A and Loop 478 are the former route of US 54 prior to construction of the Patriot Freeway. Bus. US 54-A was created when Loop 478, which originally followed the route to New Mexico, was shortened to its current terminus at the beginning of the business loop. Loop 478 was first intended in 1969 to be the replacement for US 54 over the route and was planned to be signed as Business US 54 once the current US 54 was completed. Bus. US 54-A was concurrent with US 54 until 1991.

Major intersections

The entire route is in El Paso County.

Location	mi	km	Destinations	Notes
El Paso	0.00	0.00	US 54 (Patriot Freeway) / Loop 478 (Dyer Street south)	Southern terminus; US 54 exit 26; Dyer Street continues as Loop 478
El Paso	3.8	6.1	Loop 375 (Woodrow Bean Transmountain Drive) – Canutillo	Loop 375 exit 22 eastbound, 24A westbound
El Paso	4.0	6.4	FM 2529 north (McCombs Street)	
El Paso	7.4	11.9	Spur 320 south (Borderland Expressway)	Temporary northern terminus of Spur 320
Texas–New Mexico line	12.5	20.1	US 54 – Alamogordo	Northern terminus
1.000 mi = 1.609 km; 1.000 km = 0.621 mi: Incomplete access; Route transition

== See also ==
U.S. Route 54
Previous state: Terminus	Texas	Next state: New Mexico

U.S. Route 54
Previous state: New Mexico	Texas	Next state: Oklahoma
