= Chamberlin, Texas =

Ghost town in Texas, US

- Ghost town
- Location in Texas
- Coordinates: 36.1566983°N 102.3710202°W
- Country: United States
- State: Texas
- County: Dallam
- Census code: 14152
- USGS Feature ID: 1379529

Chamberlin, also Chamberlain, is a ghost town in southeastern Dallam County, Texas, United States.

== History ==
Chamberlin is situated on the Chicago, Rock Island and Pacific Railroad and U.S. Route 54. In 1947, the community had a population of 50. The community was abandoned by the time the St. Louis Southwestern Railway took over the Rock Island line in the early 1980s.
