= Texas State Highway Spur 601 =

Highway in Texas

State Highway Spur 601
- Liberty Expressway
- Spur 601 highlighted in red

Route information
- Maintained by TxDOT
- Length: 7.4 mi (11.9 km) approximate length
- Existed: 2006–present

Major junctions
- West end: Fred Wilson Avenue in El Paso
- US 54 in El Paso
- East end: Loop 375 in Fort Bliss

Location
- Country: United States
- State: Texas
- County: El Paso

Highway system
- Highways in Texas; Interstate; US; State; Former; Toll; Loops; Spurs; FM/RM; Park; Rec
← Spur 600	→ Spur 729

Texas State Highway Spur 601 or Spur 601 is a 7.4-mile-long (11.9 km) freeway spur route in El Paso County in the U.S. State of Texas. It runs from U.S. Route 54 (US 54) in El Paso eastward to Loop 375 in the Fort Bliss Military Reservation. The construction of this freeway improved access to Biggs Army Airfield and Fort Bliss. The route is officially known as the Liberty Expressway.

== Route description ==
Spur 601 begins at an intersection with U.S. Route 54 about 4 miles north of Interstate 10. The route travels eastward along the former location of Fred Wilson Avenue, just north of Fort Bliss National Cemetery. The route then jogs southeast then northeast, squeezing between the runways of Biggs Army Airfield and El Paso International Airport. The route then turns back to the east and reaches its eastern terminus at Texas State Highway Loop 375.

== History ==
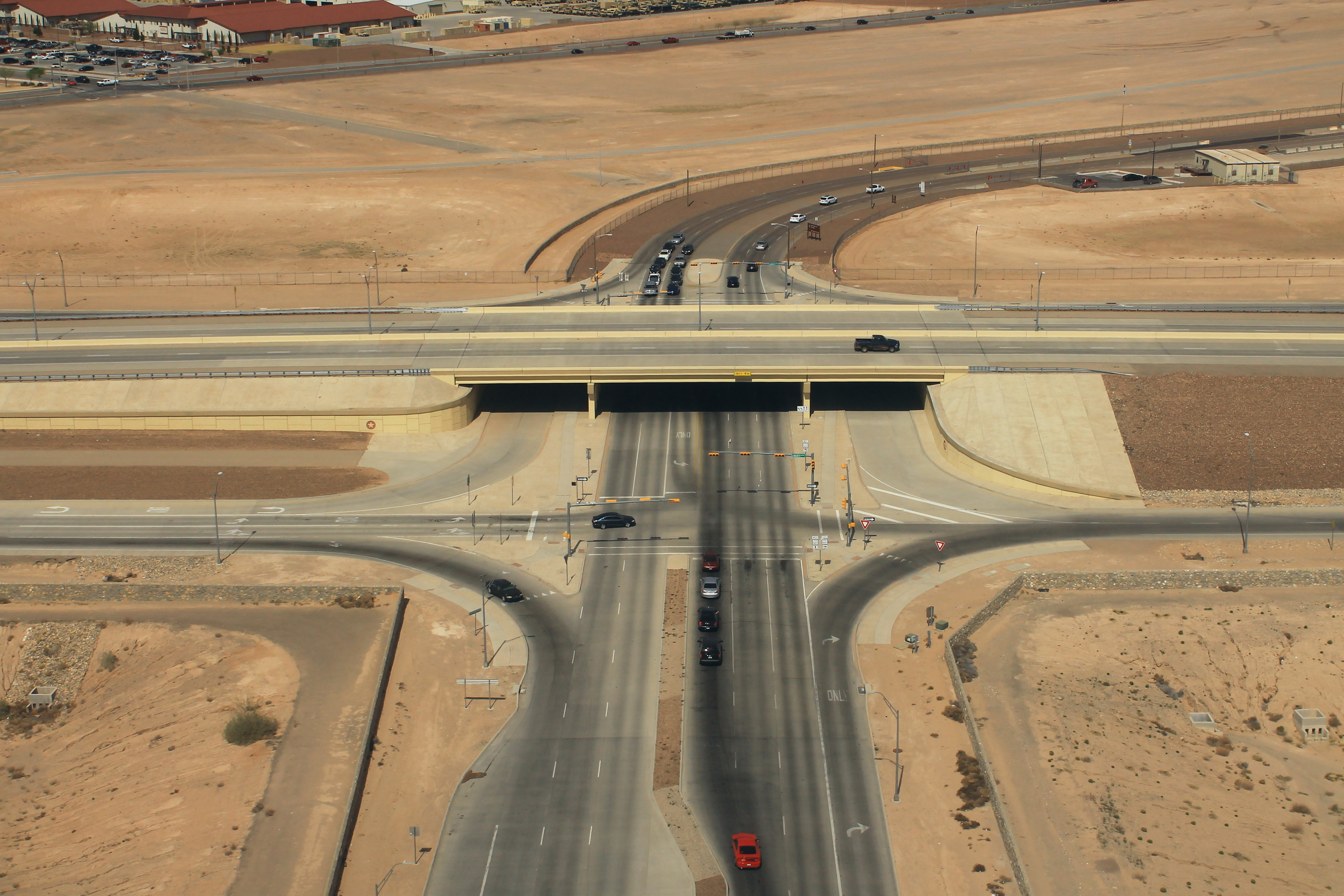
Aerial photograph of an interchange at 601

Spur 601 was officially designated on August 24, 2006 on its current route. In February 2007, the Texas Department of Transportation (TxDOT) entered into a "pass-through finance" agreement to obtain funds for the construction of the route; groundbreaking was held in the same year. On May 29, 2009, the first segment of Spur 601 opened to traffic between Global Reach Drive and Loop 375. In 2010, then Fort Bliss commander Major General Howard Bromberg asked that the route be named the Liberty Expressway; the request was approved on March 16 by the city of El Paso. Construction of Spur 601 was completed in January 2011, and a ceremony commemorating the freeway's completion was held by TxDOT on April 27, 2011. The construction of the route cost $368 million.

== Junction list ==
The entire route is in El Paso County.

Location	mi	km	Exit	Destinations	Notes
El Paso	0.0	0.0	19	Fred Wilson Avenue	Western terminus
El Paso	0.1	0.16	20A	US 54 / Fred Wilson Avenue – El Paso, Alamogordo	US 54 exit 24B; westbound exit and eastbound entrance
Fort Bliss	0.2	0.32	20B	Railroad Drive / Fred Wilson Avenue	Westbound exit and eastbound entrance
Fort Bliss	1.0	1.6	21	Chaffee Road / Fred Wilson Avenue	No westbound exit
Fort Bliss	1.7	2.7	22	Sergeant Major Boulevard / Airport Road – Biggs AAF Main Gate, Airport	
Fort Bliss	4.2	6.8	25	Old Ironsides Avenue / Global Reach Drive –Airport	
Fort Bliss	5.8	9.3	26	Constitution Avenue	
Fort Bliss	7.4	11.9	28	Loop 375	Eastern terminus; Diverging diamond interchange; Loop 375 exit 30
1.000 mi = 1.609 km; 1.000 km = 0.621 mi: Incomplete access
