= Texas State Highway Loop 375 =

Partial beltway of El Paso, Texas

State Highway Loop 375
- Loop 375 highlighted in red

Route information
- Maintained by TxDOT
- Length: 49.21 mi (79.20 km)
- Existed: 1963–present

Major junctions
- Beltway around El Paso
- Counterclockwise end: I-10 / US 85 / US 180 in El Paso
- US 54 in El Paso; US 62 / US 180 in El Paso; I-10 in El Paso; US 54 in El Paso
- Clockwise end: US 62 / US 85 in El Paso

Location
- Country: United States
- State: Texas
- Counties: El Paso

Highway system
- Highways in Texas; Interstate; US; State; Former; Toll; Loops; Spurs; FM/RM; Park; Rec
← Loop 374	→ Loop 376

Loop 375 is a beltway that partially encircles the city of El Paso, Texas. The beltway is mostly a freeway, except for its northern section, which includes at-grade intersections. The highway passes through various areas of El Paso, funneling traffic within and around the city. The road is known locally under different names, as Woodrow Bean Transmountain Drive in the northern section, Purple Heart Memorial Freeway in the northeastern section, Joe Battle Boulevard in the eastern section, the César Chávez Border Highway in the southern section, and the Border West Expressway on the southwest section.

== Route description ==
=== Woodrow Bean Transmountain Drive ===
Loop 375 begins clockwise at an intersection with I-10 near Canutillo. Heading east, the highway enters and passes through the Franklin Mountains State Park and the Fort Bliss Castner Range before leaving at Northeast El Paso, where it meets US 54. The highway passes through Northeast El Paso before entering Fort Bliss.

The section through Franklin Mountains State Park includes many road cuts which expose outcrops of Precambrian rocks, which are some of the oldest in Texas.

=== Purple Heart Memorial Freeway ===
After entering Fort Bliss, the highway bypasses Biggs Army Airfield to the north and east, and meets Spur 601 east of the airfield, before leaving at an intersection with US 62/US 180 in Southeast El Paso.

=== Joe Battle Boulevard ===
After leaving Fort Bliss, the highway passes through Southeast El Paso, heading south through residential neighborhoods, before curving southwest to meet I-10 at a stack interchange. Continuing southwest, the highway passes through more neighborhoods before meeting the El Paso Ysleta Port of Entry.

=== César Chávez Border Highway ===
After meeting the El Paso Ysleta Port of Entry, the highway curves northwest, following the Mexican border along the Rio Grande. Heading into downtown, the highway intersects US 54 at an interchange, passing unter the El Paso BOTA Port of Entry. The highway continues west into downtown, ending at US 62/US 85 Paisano Drive in downtown.

=== Border West Expressway ===
The newest segment of Loop 375, the Border West Expressway, passes from downtown through a narrow gap between UTEP and the Mexican border. Between Interstate 10 and US Route 85 (the CanAm Highway), the route is elevated above railroad tracks. The segment serves as an alternate route to I-10 to relieve traffic congestion in and around downtown El Paso.

The project, originally known simply as the Loop 375 Extension, was approved in September 2007. The Border West Expressway name was adopted in 2014. Construction began in 2015 with a planned completion date of late 2017, but this was pushed back to 2019.

The extension was planned as a four-lane toll road built by the Texas Department of Transportation (TxDOT) with tolls collected by the Camino Real Regional Mobility Authority (CRRMA). However, when the extension opened for traffic on October 3, 2019, no tolls were collected. CRRMA planned to start charging tolls once given approval by TxDOT, but this did not occur. Eventually, on October 26, 2023, CRRMA and TxDOT agreed to remove tolls on the expressway altogether, as CRRMA determined the road would have operated at a loss if tolls were implemented. The road is set to be integrated into the State Highway system once the tolling equipment is removed.

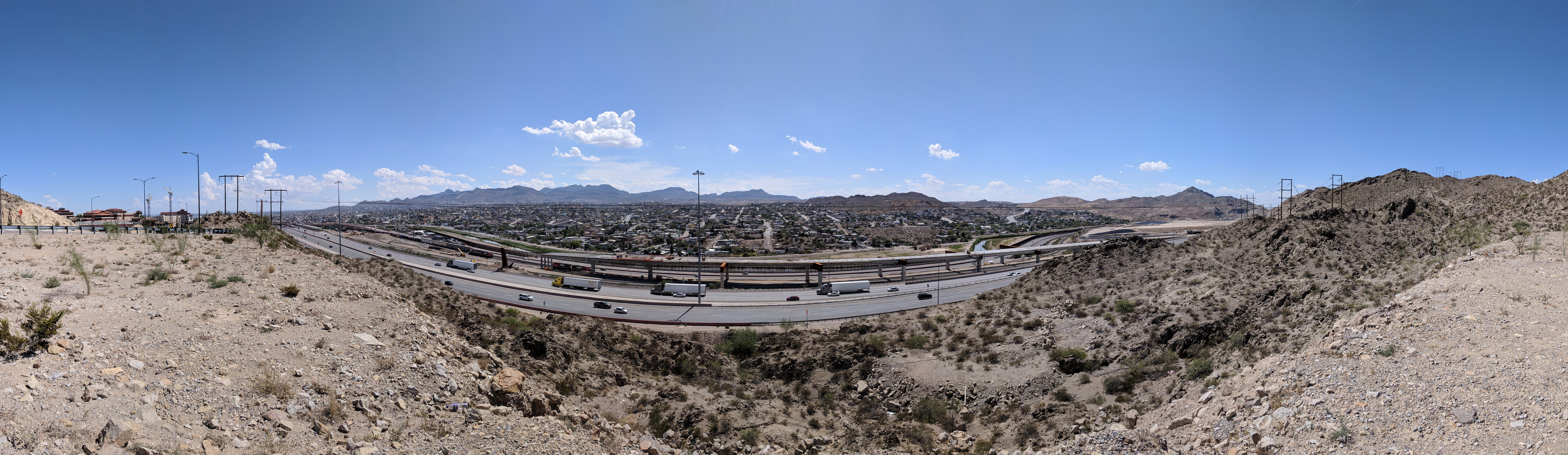
A panoramic view from Sun Bowl Drive at the University of Texas at El Paso, toward the nearby residential neighborhood of Ciudad Juárez, Chihuahua, Mexico, about 350 m away. This pass full of transportation arteries is the "Paso del Norte" after which El Paso is named, the route of the Camino Real de Tierra Adentro (royal road of the interior land) from Mexico to Santa Fe. In this narrow valley are the Interstate 10 freeway, the under-construction (in August 2018) Border West Expressway, the Union Pacific and BNSF railroads, US Highway 85 (Paisano Drive, CanAm Highway), a border fence, the American Canal, and the Rio Grande. The new expressway will mostly occupy space above the railroad tracks.

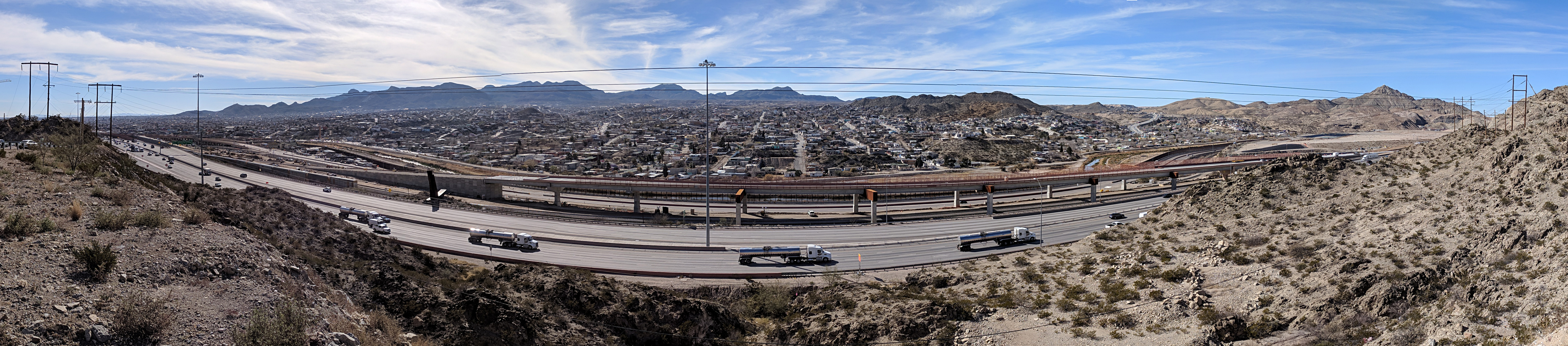
January 2019 construction progress. Note the new ramp behind the UTEP Miners' pickaxe sculpture. This ramp and elevated roadway will carry the westbound lanes of the new expressway; the eastbound lanes are at grade, on the far side of the train tracks.

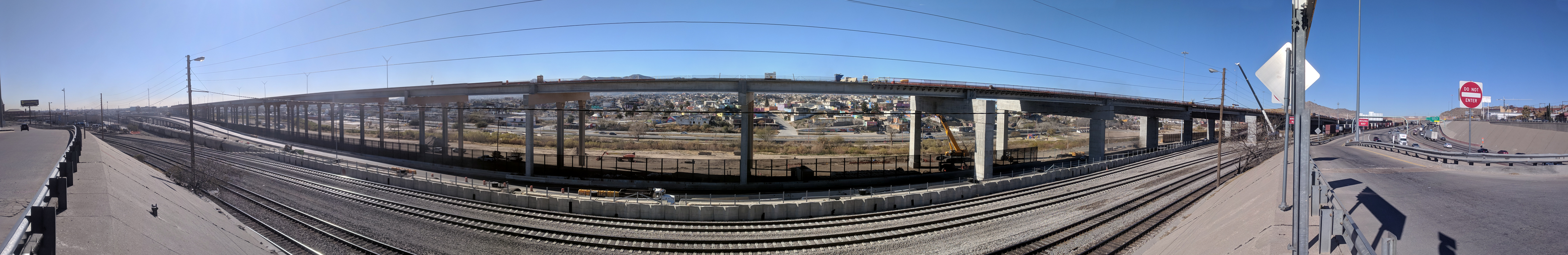
January 2019 view of another segment, from the Porfirio Diaz Street–Interstate 10 interchange ramp. The border fence, Rio Grande, and Ciudad Juarez are visible under the new elevated roadway.

== History ==
Loop 375 was designated on January 26, 1962, from I-10 southeastward, eastward, southeastward, and southward to the Zaragoza International Bridge. On January 1, 1965, the section of FM 259 from I-10 to US 80 (now SH 20) became part of Loop 375. On April 1, 1968, Loop 375 was extended northwestward 12.5 miles, and the section to the Zaragoza International Bridge became a spur connection. On January 29, 1991, the section from SH 20 northeast to Loop 375 was also added, which when constructed, the old route of Loop 375 was to be deleted. On April 24, 2008, this section was deleted, but was restored as Spur 276 on July 31, 2008, but this was changed to Spur 16 on July 26, 2012, probably due to a reference to the old Loop 16.

In 2012, construction commenced on upgrades of the Transmountain Drive section of Loop 375. This expansion was controversial, as this section passes through the protected Franklin Mountains State Park.

== Future ==
As of 2024, the toll signage and equipment, on the Border-West Expressway segment, is still in place. There is still no information as to when TXDOT will go about removing the equipment and replacing the signage.

== Exit list ==
The entire route is in El Paso County.

Location	mi	km	Exit	Destinations	Notes
El Paso	0.00	0.00	8	SH 20	Future interchange; counterclockwise terminus
El Paso	0.75	1.21	9	Spur 16 south (Transmountain Drive west)	Future interchange
El Paso	0.99	1.59	10	I-10 / US 85 / US 180 – Las Cruces	Interchange; I-10 exit 6A
El Paso	1.18– 1.55	1.90– 2.49	11A	Northwestern Drive	Interchange; west (counterclockwise) end of freeway; eastbound exit and westbound entrance; westbound access via exit 11B
El Paso	1.18– 1.55	1.90– 2.49	11A	I-10 east (US 85 / US 180) – El Paso	Westbound exit and eastbound entrance; I-10 exit 6B
El Paso	1.62	2.61	11B	Resler Drive / Plexxar Drive	Plexxar Drive replaced by Northwestern Drive on westbound signage
El Paso	2.61	4.20	12	Paseo Del Norte Drive	Interchange; east (clockwise) end of freeway
El Paso	Gap in route				
El Paso	11.18	17.99	21	US 54 / Kenworthy Street	Interchange; west (counterclockwise) end of freeway; US 54 exit 29
El Paso	12.43	20.00	22	Bus. US 54 (Dyer Street) / FM 2529 (McCombs Street)	Signed as exit 24A westbound
El Paso	13.67	22.00	24	Bomarc Street / Railroad Drive	Signed as exit 24B westbound; Bomarc Street not signed westbound
El Paso	16.16	26.01	25	Spur 320 north (Borderland Expressway)	
Fort Bliss	16.61	26.73	Cardinal direction change: Northern leg (west–east) / Eastern leg (north–south)		
Fort Bliss	18.20	29.29	26	Sergeant Major Boulevard	Access to Biggs Army Airfield and East Fort Bliss; formerly signed as "Not a Public Exit – Construction Vehicles Only"
Fort Bliss	20.51	33.01	30	Spur 601 west (Liberty Expressway) – Airport	
Fort Bliss	21.75	35.00	32	Iron Medics Drive	Provides access to the William Beaumont Army Medical Center
El Paso	24.85	39.99	35	US 62 / US 180 (Montana Avenue)	
El Paso	26.00	41.84	38	Edgemere Boulevard	
El Paso	26.72	43.00	39	Pebble Hills Boulevard	
El Paso			40	FM 659 (Zaragoza Road) / Montwood Drive	Signed as exit 40B northbound
El Paso			40A	FM 659 north (Zaragoza Road)	Northbound exit and southbound entrance
El Paso			41	Vista Del Sol Drive	
El Paso			42A	Pellicano Drive / Rojas Drive	Signed as exit 42 southbound; signed as Pellicano Drive only northbound
El Paso			42B	Bob Hope Drive	No direct southbound exit (signed at exit 42)
El Paso			44	I-10	Exits from frontage road signed as 44B (I-10 west) and 44C (I-10 east); I-10 exit 34
El Paso			45	FM 76 (North Loop Road) / Rojas Drive	
El Paso			47	SH 20 (Alameda Avenue) / FM 258 (Socorro Road) / Pan American Drive	
El Paso			48	Zaragoza Road	To Zaragoza International Bridge
El Paso			Cardinal direction change: Eastern leg (north–south) / Southern leg (west–east)		
El Paso			49	Padres Drive	
El Paso			—	Plant Road	Eastbound exit and entrance
El Paso			51	Yarbrough Drive	
El Paso			53	Midway Drive	
El Paso			56	Fonseca Drive	
El Paso			58	US 54 east to I-10 (US 180)	Western terminus of US 54
El Paso			59	US 62 (Paisano Drive) / Coles Street	Coles Street not signed westbound
El Paso			60A	Campbell Street	Closed; was westbound right-in/right-out
El Paso			60	Oregon Street	Westbound right-in/right-out was signed as 60B
El Paso			62	Spur 1966 – UT El Paso	
El Paso			64	Executive Center Boulevard	
El Paso			65A	Doniphan Road	Westbound exit and eastbound entrance
El Paso			65B	Sunland Park Drive to I-10 east (US 180 east)	Westbound exit only
El Paso			66	US 85 east (Paisano Drive)	East end of US 85 overlap; eastbound exit and westbound entrance
El Paso			—	Racetrack Drive	Eastbound exit and westbound entrance
El Paso			13	Sunland Park Drive	Exit numbers follow I-10 mileage; no westbound exit
El Paso			12	Resler Drive	Westbound exit and eastbound entrance
El Paso			11	SH 20 (Mesa Street)	Westbound exit and eastbound entrance
El Paso				I-10 west (US 85 north / US 180 west)	Clockwise terminus; west end of US 85 overlap; I-10 exit 13
1.000 mi = 1.609 km; 1.000 km = 0.621 mi: Closed/former; Concurrency terminus; Incomplete access; Proposed; Route transition

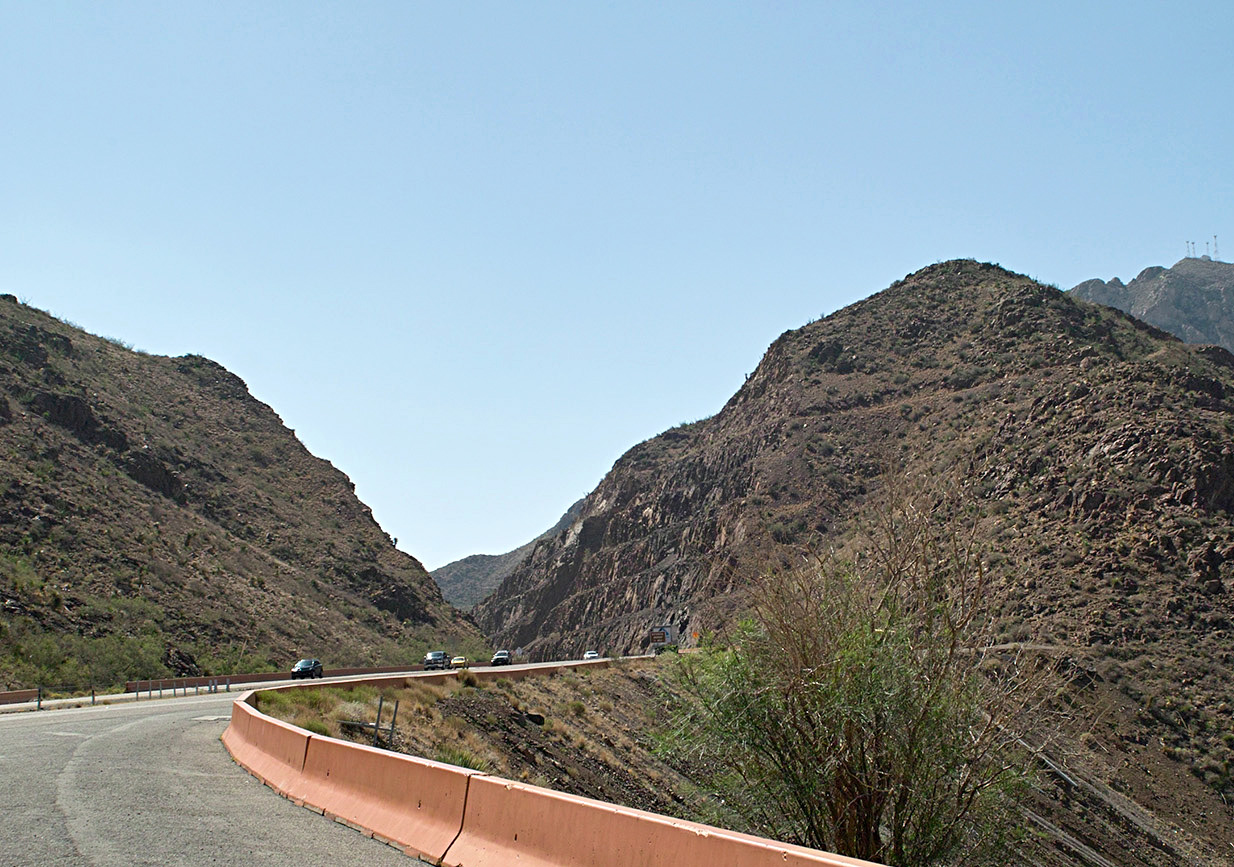
The largest road cut on Transmountain Drive, at the mile-high crest of Smuggler's Pass

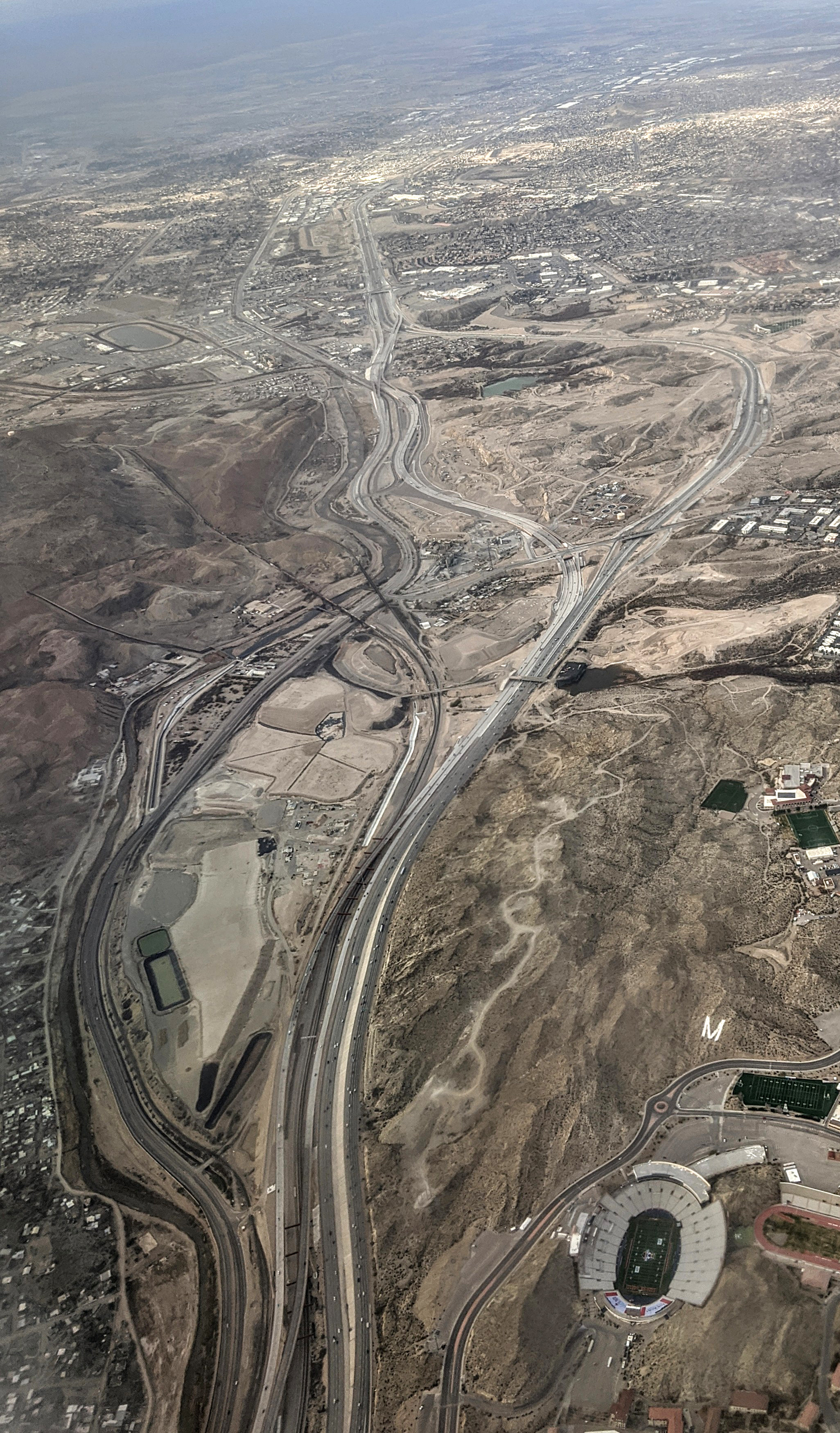
Border West Expressway and I-10 in west El Paso

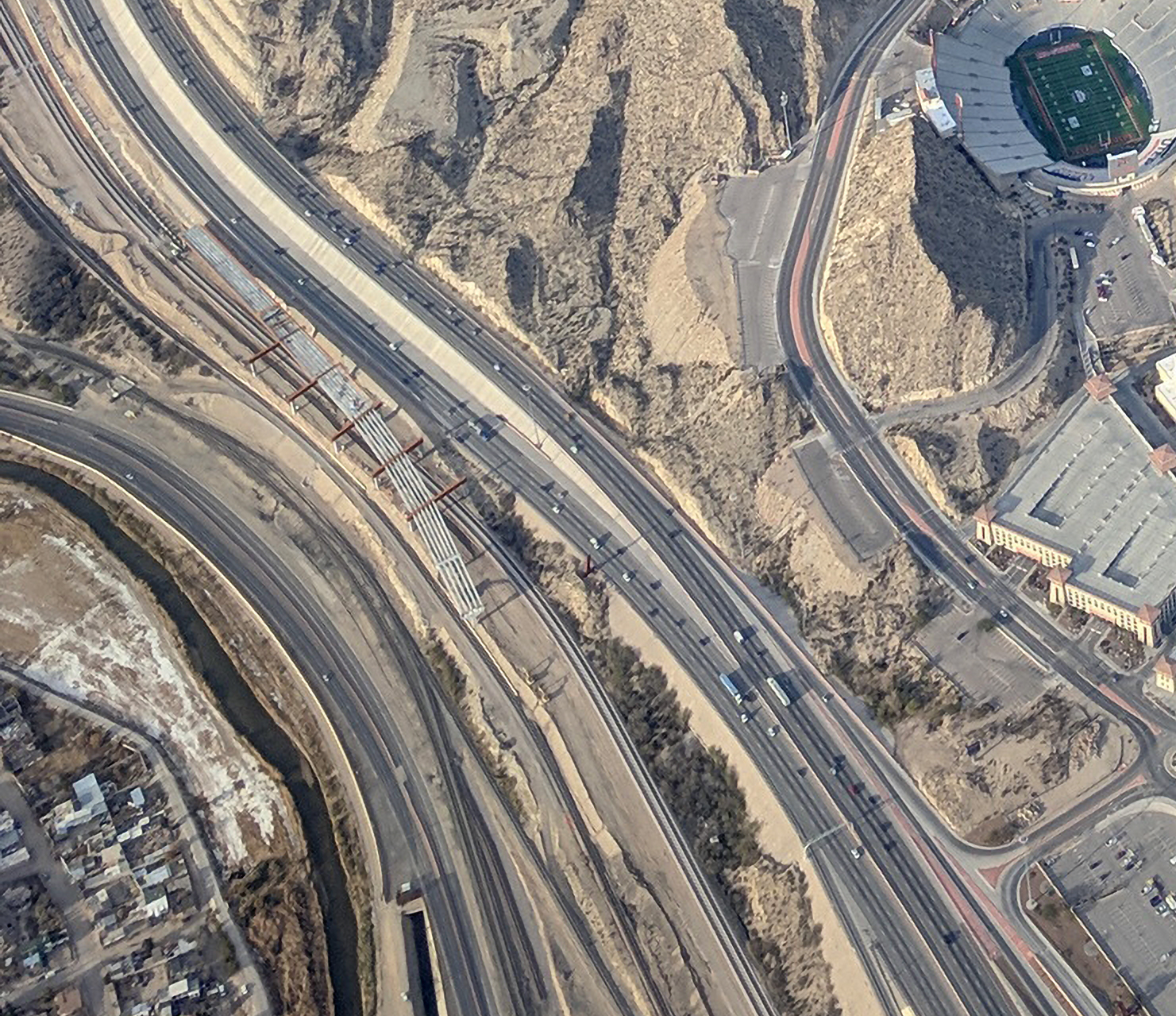
This aerial view of the Mexico–US border near the Sun Bowl stadium in El Paso, Texas, shows the state of construction of the Border West Expressway crossing above the railroad tracks (center), in December 2017. The neighborhood at the lower left is in Ciudad Juárez, Chihuahua, Mexico.

== See also ==
- List of state highway loops in Texas
