= Bridge of the Americas (El Paso–Ciudad Juárez) =

Bridge connecting the Mexican state of Chihuahua with the U.S. state of Texas

Bridge of the Americas Puente Río Bravo
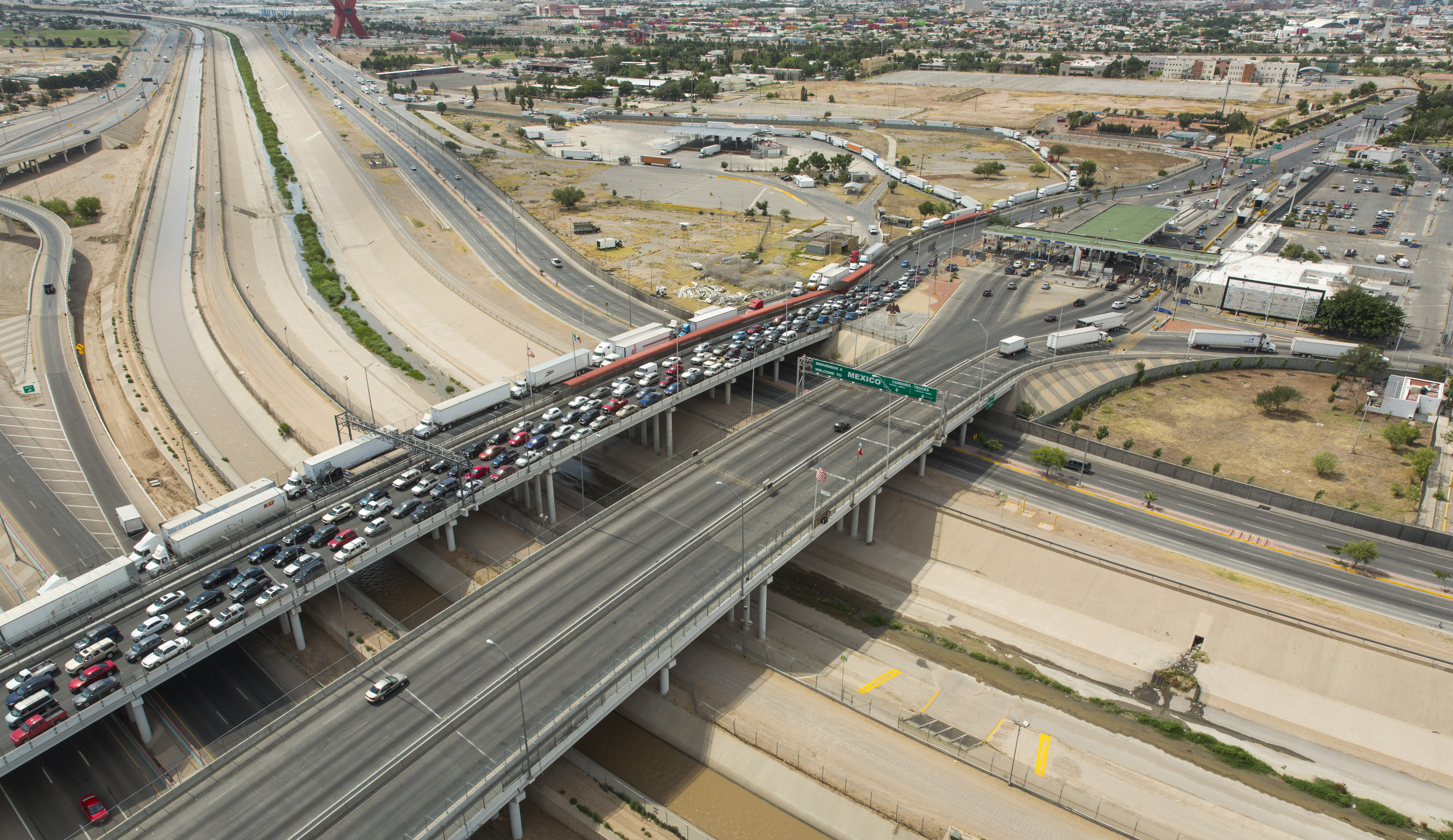
- The Bridge of the Americas as seen from El Paso, Texas, in June 2016.
- Coordinates: 31°45′53″N 106°27′04″W
- Carries: Fed. 45/ I-110, pedestrians
- Crosses: Rio Grande; Loop 375
- Locale: El Paso–Ciudad Juárez
- Official name: Puente Internacional Córdova-Las Américas
- Other name: Cordova Bridge
- Named for: The Americas
- Owner: City of El Paso

History
- Construction start: 1996
- Construction end: 1998

Statistics
- Toll: None

Location
- Interactive map of Bridge of the Americas

The Bridge of the Americas (BOTA) is a group of international bridges which cross the Rio Grande (Río Bravo) and Texas State Highway Loop 375, connecting the Mexico–United States border cities of Ciudad Juárez, Chihuahua, and El Paso, Texas, via the MX 45 (known as Avenida de las Américas in its Ciudad Juárez section) from the south and the I-110 from the north, crossing the El Paso BOTA Port of Entry.

== Description and names ==
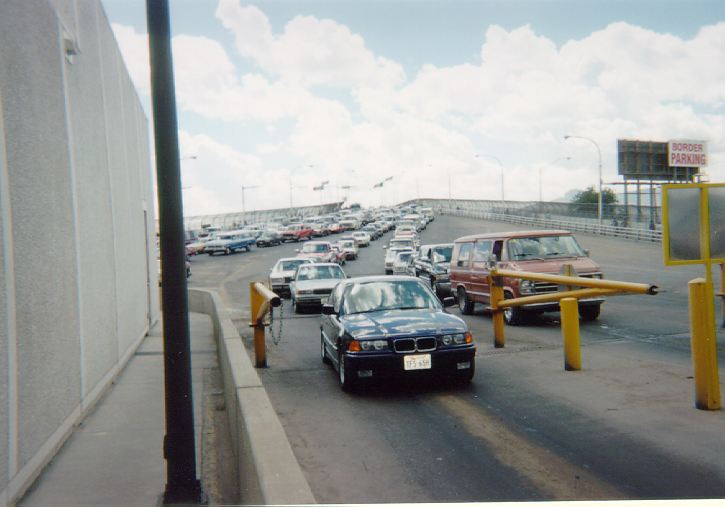
U.S.-bound traffic exiting the bridge in June 2002.

The Bridge of the Americas consists of two bridges comprising four separate structures: two two-lane bridges for truck traffic, northbound and southbound; and two four-lane bridges for passenger vehicles, with two sidewalks for pedestrians. The bridge is one of four international points of entry connecting Ciudad Juárez and El Paso, forming the binational metropolitan area of El Paso–Juárez, alongside the Ysleta–Zaragoza International Bridge, Paso del Norte Bridge, and Stanton Street Bridge.

The Bridge of the Americas is known by multiple names. In Mexico, it is officially referred to as Puente Internacional Córdova–Las Américas ("Córdova–The Americas International Bridge") or Puente Internacional Córdova de las Américas ("Córdova of the Americas International Bridge"), and colloquially as Puente Río Bravo ("Rio Bravo Bridge"), Puente Córdova ("Cordova Bridge"), and Puente Libre ("Free Bridge"), in reference to the fact that it is a free, toll-free crossing.

== History ==
The bridges were constructed from 1996 to 1998. The bridge is owned by the International Boundary and Water Commission, and operated in its American section by U.S. Customs and Border Protection and its Mexican section by Mexican Customs. It is one of just five bridges connecting Mexico and the United States from Ciudad Juárez.

== Border crossing ==
The El Paso BOTA Port of Entry is El Paso's highest volume border crossing, carrying more than half the vehicles (trucks and passenger cars) entering El Paso, Texas, from Mexico. This is due in large part to the fact that BOTA is the only bridge in between Mexico and Texas that does not charge a toll. It is a "Class A" service port with a full range of cargo processing functions, and it is open for passenger vehicle traffic 24/7. It is available from 6:00 AM to 2:00 PM on weekdays for commercial truck inspections.

Construction on the BOTA crossing was completed in 1967 as part of the Chamizal Treaty between the US and Mexico signed in 1963 that involved a land exchange between the two countries. The El Paso property where the US border inspection station at BOTA is located was Mexican land prior to the execution of this treaty.

== In popular culture ==
The American drama television series The Bridge (2013) is set on the Bridge of the Americas and in surrounding areas.

The bridge is featured in the Denis Villeneuve film Sicario (2015).

== See also ==
- List of crossings of the Rio Grande
- List of international bridges in North America
