= List of Mexico–United States border crossings =

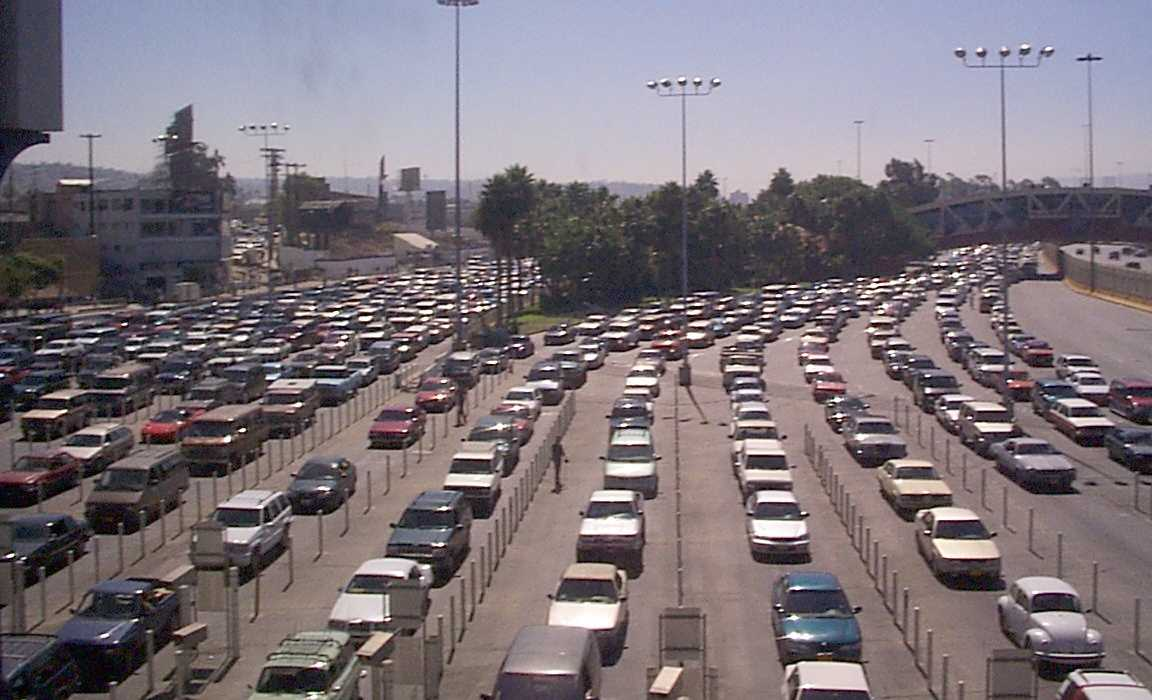
Traffic approaching the San Ysidro, San Diego border inspection station in 2010.

There are over 50 places where people may cross the Mexico–United States border. There are also at least eight rail crossings and one ferry crossing along the border. Several large border cities have multiple crossings, often including one or more that bypass the center of the city and are designated for truck traffic. Several crossings have also been closed by the governments of either Mexico or the U.S., or both.

On the U.S. side, the Department of State assigns a three-letter Port of Entry code to each crossing. This code is included on the passport entry stamp or parole stamp one receives when crossing into the U.S. Note that one code may correspond to multiple crossings.

== Vehicle and pedestrian crossings ==
United States Port of Entry	Code	United States Road/Highway	City and State	Mexican Port of Entry	Mexican Road/Highway	City and State	Structure or Notable Feature	Opened
=== California–Baja California ===
PedWest	SYS	Virginia Avenue	San Ysidro, California	Puerta Oeste	Plaza Viva Tijuana	Tijuana, Baja California	Pedestrian only; southbound into MX has limited hours.	2016
San Ysidro	SYS	I-5 (John J. Montgomery Freeway)	San Ysidro, California	El Chaparral	Fed. 1	Tijuana, Baja California	No Trucks	1906
San Ysidro Pedestrian	SYS	San Ysidro Boulevard	San Ysidro, California	Puerta Este	Rampa Xicoténcatl	Tijuana, Baja California	Pedestrian only	1906
Cross-border Terminal, Tijuana International Airport	OTM	Otay Pacific Drive	Otay Mesa, California	Tijuana International Airport	Carretera Aeropuerto S/N, colonia Nueva Tijuana	Tijuana, Baja California	Pedestrian only, ticketed passengers only	2015
Otay Mesa	OTM	SR 905 (Otay Mesa Freeway)	Otay Mesa, California	Mesa de Otay	Boulevard Garita de Otay	Tijuana, Baja California		1983
Otay Mesa Pedestrian	OTM	Paseo Internacional	Otay Mesa, California	Mesa de Otay	Boulevard Garita de Otay	Tijuana, Baja California	Pedestrian only	1983
Tecate	TEC	SR 188	Tecate, California	Tecate	Avenida Presidente Lázaro Cárdenas	Tecate, Baja California		1919
Calexico West	CAL	Cesar Chavez Boulevard	Calexico, California	Mexicali	Calzada de los Presidentes	Mexicali, Baja California	No Trucks	1902
Calexico West Pedestrian	CAL	East First Street	Calexico, California	Mexicali	Calle Agustín Melgar	Mexicali, Baja California	Pedestrian only	1902
Calexico East	IVP	SR 7	Calexico, California	Mexicali	Boulevard Abelardo L. Rodríguez	Mexicali, Baja California		1996
Andrade	AND	SR 186	Andrade, California	Los Algodones	Ave. Mariano Lee y calle 2a.	Los Algodones, Baja California		1927
=== Arizona–Sonora ===
San Luis	SLU	US 95 (Main Street)	San Luis, Arizona	San Luis Río Colorado	Calle 1	San Luis Río Colorado, Sonora	No Trucks	1930
San Luis II	SLU	SR 195	San Luis, Arizona	San Luis Río Colorado 2	Fed. 2	San Luis Río Colorado, Sonora	No cars or pedestrians, trucks only	2010
Lukeville	LUK	SR 85	Lukeville, Arizona	Sonoyta	Fed. 8 (Benemérito de las Americas)	Sonoyta, Sonora		1949
Sasabe	SAS	SR 286	Sasabe, Arizona	Sasabe	Calle Sásabe	El Sásabe, Sonora		1916
Nogales–Mariposa	NOG	SR 189 (North Mariposa Road)	Nogales, Arizona	Mariposa	Fed. 15D	Nogales, Sonora		1973
Nogales-Grand Avenue	NOG	BL 19 (Grand Avenue)	Nogales, Arizona	Nogales	Fed. 15	Nogales, Sonora	No Trucks	1903
Nogales-Morley Gate	NOG	Morley Avenue	Nogales, Arizona	Nogales	Plutarco Elias Calles	Nogales, Sonora	Pedestrians only	1913
Naco	NAC	D Street	Naco, Arizona	Naco	Avenida Francisco I Madera	Naco, Sonora		1900
Douglas	DOU	US 191 Bus. (Pan American Avenue)	Douglas, Arizona	Agua Prieta	Calzada Panamericana	Agua Prieta, Sonora		1914
=== New Mexico–Chihuahua ===
Antelope Wells	ANP	NM 81	Antelope Wells, New Mexico	El Berrendo	Carretera El Berrendo-Janos	El Berrendo, Chihuahua		1928
Columbus	COL	NM 11 (Ike Smalley Memorial Highway)	Columbus, New Mexico	Palomas	Fed. 2 spur	Puerto Palomas, Chihuahua		1902
Santa Teresa	STR	NM 136 (Pete Domenici Boulevard)	Santa Teresa, New Mexico	San Jeronimo	Carretera Samalayuca el Oasis	San Jerónimo, Chihuahua		1992
Santa Teresa Livestock export-import facility	STR	NM 136 (Binational Avenue)	Santa Teresa, New Mexico	San Jeronimo	Carretera Anapra-San Jeronimo	San Jerónimo, Chihuahua	Livestock only (no trucks, no cars, no pedestrians)	?
=== Texas–Chihuahua ===
El Paso-PDN	PDN	US 62; US 85 (El Paso Street)	El Paso, Texas	Santa Fe	Vial Juan Gabriel	Ciudad Juárez, Chihuahua	One-way northbound only; no trucks; two-way for pedestrians; [[]]	1898
El Paso-Stanton	ELP	US 85 (Stanton Street)	El Paso, Texas	Lerdo	Calle Lerdo	Ciudad Juárez, Chihuahua	Northbound SENTRI-only and Southbound	1898
El Paso–BOTA	BOA	I-110	El Paso, Texas	Cordova	Fed. 45 (Av. Abraham Lincoln)	Ciudad Juárez, Chihuahua		1967
El Paso–Ysleta	YSL	Zaragoza Road	El Paso, Texas	Zaragoza	Avenida Zaragoza	Ciudad Juárez, Chihuahua		1938
Marcelino Serna	FAB	FM 3380	Tornillo, Texas	Guadalupe	Fed. 2	Guadalupe, Chihuahua		2014
Fort Hancock	FHK	FM 1088	Fort Hancock, Texas	El Porvenir	Praxedis Guerrero	El Porvenir, Chihuahua	no trucks	1936
Presidio	PRE	US 67	Presidio, Texas	Ojinaga	Fed. 16	Ojinaga, Chihuahua		1917
=== Texas–Coahuila ===
Boquillas		Big Bend National Park	Big Bend, Texas	Boquillas del Carmen		Boquillas del Carmen, Coahuila	Crossing re-opened in April 2013. Transit of the Rio Grande can be accomplished by foot, burro, or rowboat. Motor vehicles are not permitted. Border crossing is staffed by NPS rangers. People entering the US must report for inspection using video kiosks. There are also border services on the Mexico side.	2013
Amistad Dam	ADT	Spur 349	Del Rio, Texas	La Amistad	Fed. 2	Ciudad Acuña, Coahuila	[no trucks	1969
Del Rio – Ciudad Acuña	DLR	Spur 239	Del Rio, Texas	Acuña	Francisco Javier Mina	Ciudad Acuña, Coahuila		1919
Eagle Pass	EGP	US 57	Eagle Pass, Texas	Piedras Negras	Fed. 57	Piedras Negras, Coahuila	no trucks	1896
Eagle Pass II	FDE	South Adams	Eagle Pass, Texas	Piedras Negras 2	Libramiento Sur	Piedras Negras, Coahuila		1999
=== Texas–Nuevo León ===
Laredo–Colombia Solidarity	LCB	SH 255 (Camino Columbia Road)	Laredo, Texas	Colombia	Nuevo Leon State Highway Spur 1	Colombia, Nuevo León	Laredo Bridge 3	1991
=== Texas–Tamaulipas ===
Laredo-World Trade	LWT	I-69W; US 59; Loop 20 (Bob Bullock Loop)	Laredo, Texas	Nuevo Laredo	Fed. 85D	Nuevo Laredo, Tamaulipas	Laredo Bridge 4; no cars or pedestrians - commercial vehicles only	2000
Laredo Bridge 1	LAR	I-35 BL (Convent Avenue)	Laredo, Texas	Nuevo Laredo	Fed. 85 (Avenida Guerrero)	Nuevo Laredo, Tamaulipas	no trucks	1898
Laredo-Juarez/Lincoln	LLB	San Dario Avenue	Laredo, Texas	Nuevo Laredo	Boulevard Leandro Valle	Nuevo Laredo, Tamaulipas	Laredo Bridge 2 no trucks	1976
Falcon Dam	FAL	FM 2098 Spur	Falcon Heights, Texas	Guerrero	Blas de la Garza Falcon	Nueva Ciudad Guerrero, Tamaulipas	no trucks	1954
Roma	ROM	Estrella Street	Roma, Texas	Miguel Aleman	Avenida Venustiano Carranza	Ciudad Miguel Alemán, Tamaulipas		1928
Rio Grande City	RIO	Pete Díaz Avenue	Rio Grande City, Texas	Camargo	Boulevard Ensenada	Ciudad Camargo, Tamaulipas		1905
Los Ebanos	LSE	Flores Street	Los Ebanos, Texas	Diaz Ordaz	Avenida Adolfo Lopez Mateo	Gustavo Díaz Ordaz, Tamaulipas	hand-pulled ferry crossing; no trucks	1950
Anzalduas	ANZ	Bryan Road	Mission, Texas	Anzalduas	Reynosa-Monterrey Highway	Reynosa, Tamaulipas	no trucks until 2015	2009
Hidalgo	HID	South International Boulevard	Hidalgo, Texas	Reynosa	Luis Echeverria Alvarez	Reynosa, Tamaulipas		1905
Pharr	PHR	Spur 600 (South Cage Boulevard)	Pharr, Texas	Reynosa	Av Puente Pharr	Reynosa, Tamaulipas		1994
Donna	DNA	FM 493	Donna, Texas	Río Bravo	Carretera Reynosa-Matamoros	Río Bravo, Tamaulipas	Donna – Río Bravo International Bridge / Alliance International Bridge; no trucks	2010
Progreso	PGR	FM 1015	Progreso, Texas	Nuevo Progreso	Benito Juarez	Nuevo Progreso, Río Bravo, Tamaulipas		1952
Los Indios (Free Trade)	IND	FM 509 (Cantu Road)	Los Indios, Texas	Lucio Blanco	Carretera Reynosa-Matamoros	Matamoros, Tamaulipas		1992
Brownsville - B&M	BBM	Mexico Street	Brownsville, Texas	Matamoros	Las Americas	Matamoros, Tamaulipas	no trucks	1909
Brownsville - Gateway	GTW	SH 4 (International Boulevard)	Brownsville, Texas	Matamoros	Alvaro Obregon	Matamoros, Tamaulipas	no trucks	1926
Brownsville - Veterans	BRO	I-69E; US 77; US 83	Brownsville, Texas	Matamoros	Avenida 5 de Mayo	Matamoros, Tamaulipas		1999

== Proposed crossings ==
This section lists crossings of the US-Mexico Border that are in the planning or construction phases.

United States Port of Entry	United States Road/Highway	City and State	Mexican Port of Entry	Mexican Road/Highway	City and State	Status
Otay Mesa East	SR 11 Toll	East Otay Mesa, California	Mesa de Otay II		Tijuana, Baja California	This is expected to be the first toll-based border crossing on the US-Mexico border. It is planned to open in 2028.

== Closed crossings ==
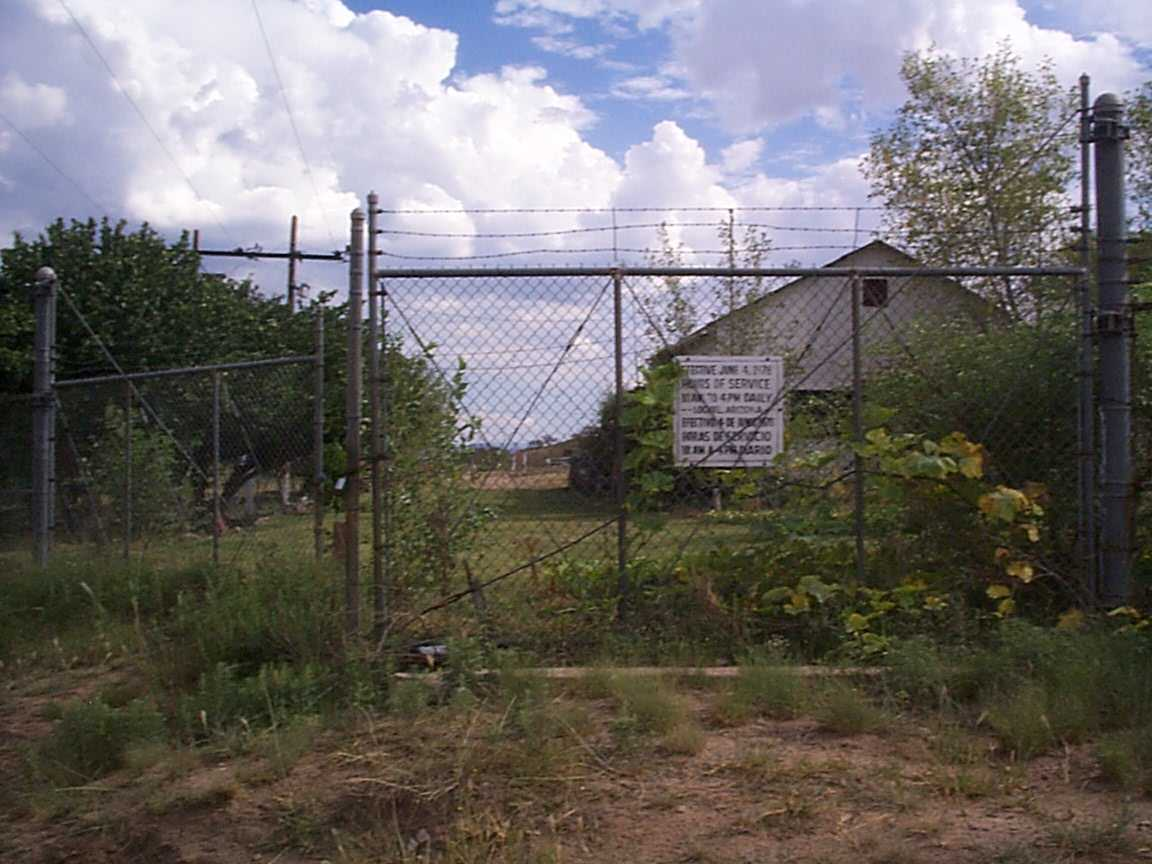
Closed Mexican border station at Lochiel, Arizona

This table includes only those roads where the governments of either the US or Mexico once had Customs or Immigration services.

Also included are places where certain legitimate vehicular or vessel traffic has been permitted to cross the border in recent years.

United States port of entry	City, State	Mexico port of entry	City, State	Notes
San Ysidro - Virginia Avenue	San Ysidro, California	El Chaparral	Tijuana, Baja California	For many years, all trucks entering the U.S. from Tijuana were inspected at this border crossing just west of the Interstate 5 crossing. It closed in 1984 when the Otay Mesa Port of Entry was completed, and where all truck traffic from Tijuana is now inspected.
Campo	Campo, California	Encinal	Encinal, Baja California	Once a popular crossing for tourists in the early 1900s, this crossing was permanently closed during World War II
San Miguel Gate	Sells, Arizona	El Bajío	El Bajío, Sonora	This crossing, also known as "the Gate," has never been a legal border crossing for most people. Nomadic Native Americans are permitted to use this gate to traverse their land on both sides of the border.
Lochiel	Lochiel, Arizona	Santa Cruz	Santa Cruz de Noria, Sonora	Station of Nogales, which closed in 1983 due to a lack of traffic. Both border inspection buildings remain.
Anapra	Sunland Park, New Mexico	Anapra	Anapra, Chihuahua	Located just 2.4 miles west of the New Mexico-Texas-Mexico tripoint, this crossing was constructed in 1971 with funds from the New Mexico and Juárez governments, with the vision of creating economic development by luring traffic from the busy El Paso crossings. However, with pressure from politicians from Texas who stood to lose liquor tax revenue, the US government refused to staff it. It is unclear if the port ever officially opened. The Mexican federal inspection canopy still stands today.
Cordova	El Paso, Texas	Córdova	Ciudad Juárez, Chihuahua	When the waters of a 1897 Rio Grande flood receded, the river was found to have changed course, resulting in 386 acres of Mexican territory called "Córdova Island" situated north of the river. Boundary markers and a fence were eventually deployed. In 1959, a border crossing opened on the East side of the island. In 1963, Presidents Kennedy and Ordaz signed a treaty that settled the Chamizal dispute, which redistributed land in the area between the US and Mexico. The location where the Córdova crossing was situated (which used to be the only Texas-Mexico border crossing not at the Rio Grande) now lies on Mexican land, on the campus of the Universidad Autónoma de Ciudad Juárez. The crossing closed in 1967 when the new Bridge of the Americas crossing opened, where the new Rio Grande channel and new boundary were established.
Fabens	Fabens, Texas	Caseta	Caseta, Chihuahua	Fabens was a small border crossing ten miles east of El Paso, Texas. It opened in 1938 and closed on November 17, 2014, when the new Tornillo Port of Entry opened nearby. The Fabens-Caseta International Bridge was too small to handle commercial traffic, and local business interests pressed for an alternate route from the busy commercial crossings in El Paso.
Heath Canyon	Heath Canyon, Texas	La Linda	La Linda, Coahuila	The La Linda International Bridge crossing opened in 1964, primarily to serve the Dow Chemical facility on the Mexican side. It was closed to legal traffic in 1989, but was prone to smuggling. The bridge was barricaded in 1997, and it remains in this condition today. Mexico had a border inspection station at this crossing, but the US did not.
San Ygnacio	San Ygnacio, Texas	San Ignacio	San Ignacio, Tamaulipas	A motor boat served as a passenger ferry during the 1950s and 1960s. The US Customs Service operated a border inspection station during those years.
Zapata	Zapata, Texas	Guerrero	Guerrero, Tamaulipas	Suspension toll bridge was opened in 1931. In 1954, Falcon Dam was completed, and the rising waters left the old town of Zapata, along with the US Customs station and the bridge itself at the bottom of the Falcon International Reservoir. A new town center was constructed on higher ground outside town.
Mercedes	Mercedes, Texas	Río Rico	Río Rico, Tamaulipas	The Thayer Bridge (also called the Río Rico Bridge) was built in 1928 and opened up the Mexican border town of Río Rico as a tourist destination during prohibition, with bars and even a casino. The crossing was located about two miles (3.2 km) downstream from where the Progreso bridge would later be built. The bridge was destroyed by a flood in 1941. After its destruction, temporary access was provided by ferry and pontoon bridge, but all services had ended by 1946. In 1967, it was discovered that Rio Rico had actually been located on US soil all along, and in 1970, the land was officially ceded to Mexico. Approximately 1000 people who provided evidence that they were born in Río Rico over the years were given US citizenship.

== Rail crossings ==
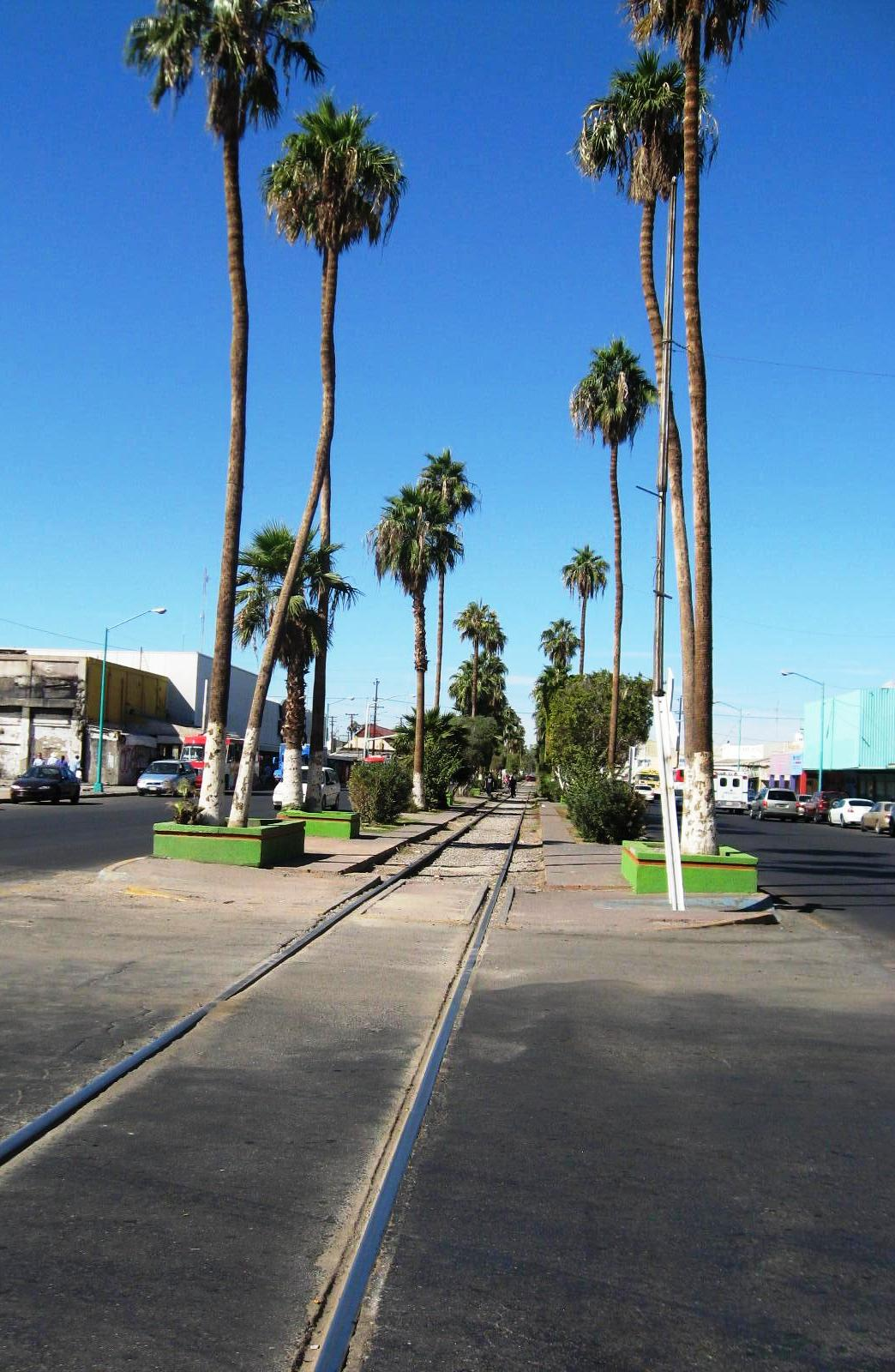
Rail tracks on Boulevard Adolfo López Mateos in Mexicali leading north to the border crossing at Calexico

Baja California–California
Mexico rail company	Mexico nearest community	United States rail company	United States nearest community	Notes
BJRR	Tijuana	SDIY	San Ysidro	Operated along the San Diego and Arizona Eastern Railway's Main Line.
FXE	Mexicali	UP	Calexico	Rail tracks lie within the median of the road crossing from Fed. 5 to SR 111.

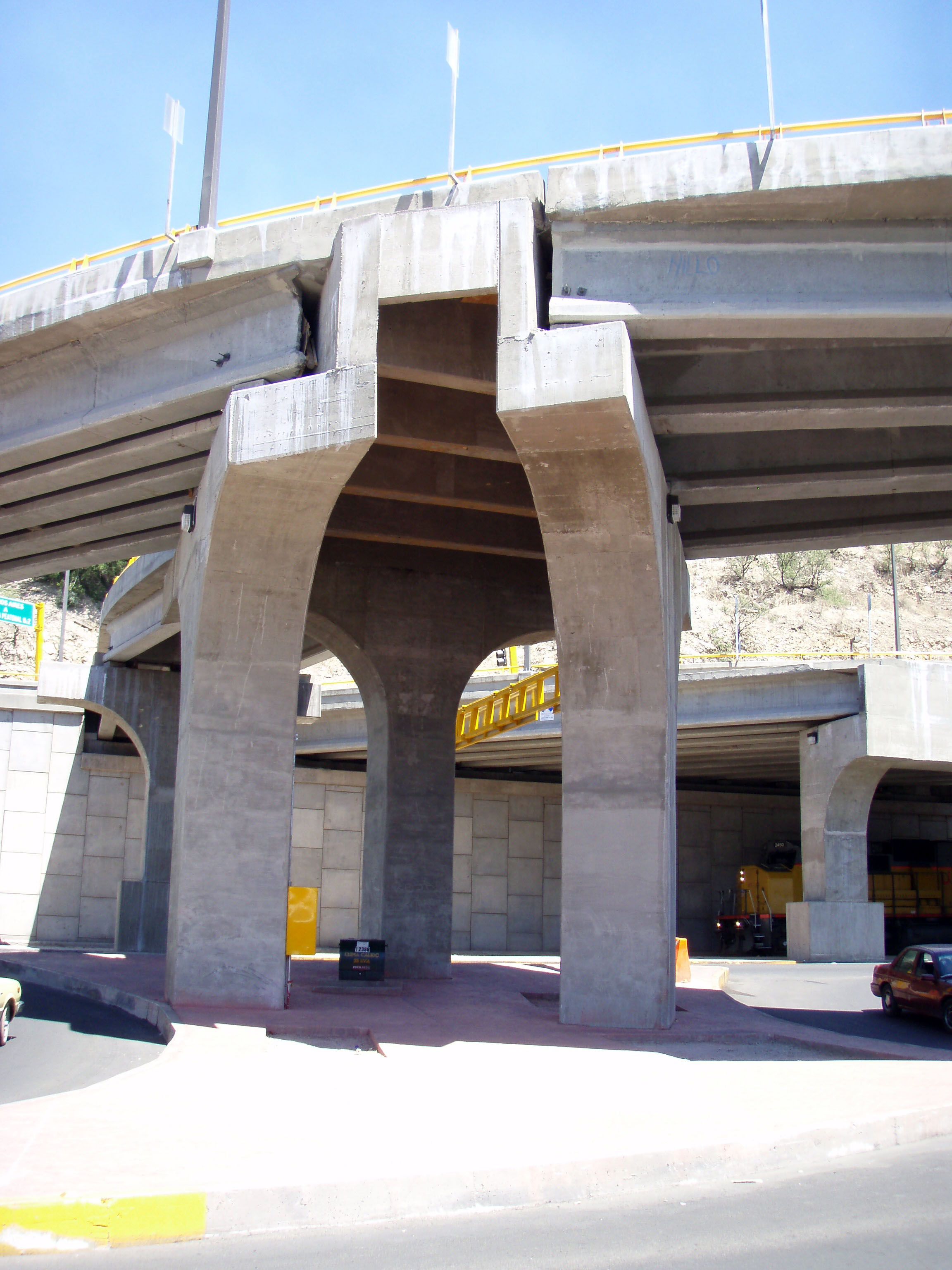
A Union Pacific train travels under a bridge in Nogales, Sonora headed to Arizona, 9 June 2007

Sonora–Arizona
Mexico rail company	Mexico nearest community	United States rail company	United States nearest community	Notes
FXE	Nogales	UP	Nogales	Rail tracks lie within the median of the road crossing.

Chihuahua–Texas
Structure	Mexico rail company	Mexico nearest community	United States rail company	United States nearest community	Notes
EP&SW bridge	FXE	Ciudad Juárez	UP / BNSF	El Paso	There are two railroad bridges over the Rio Grande that lie to the west and east of Paso del Norte International Bridge.
Presidio–Ojinaga International Rail Bridge	FXE	Ojinaga	TXPF	Presidio	Bridge is temporarily closed due to a fire.

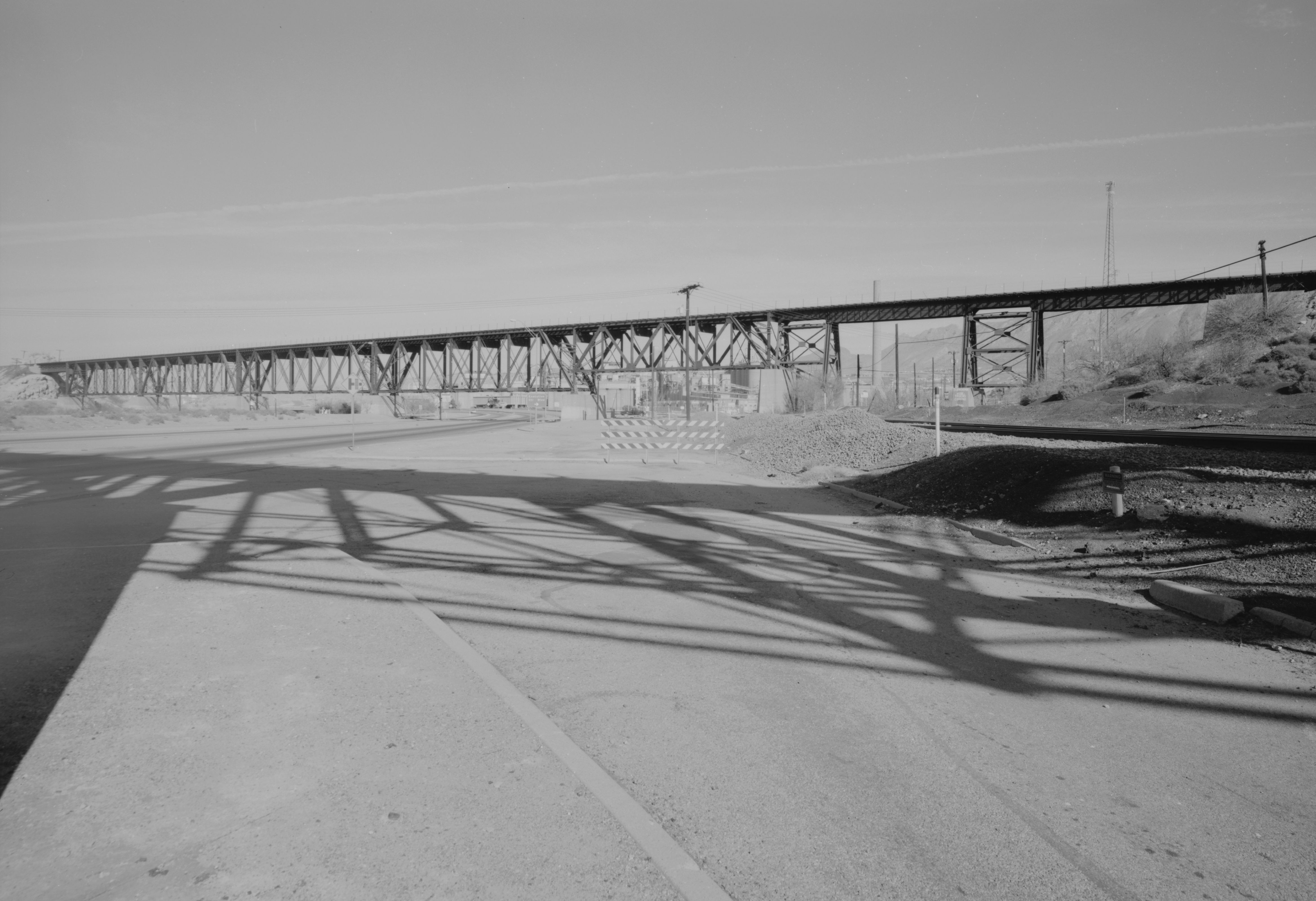
Bridge of the El Paso and Southwestern Railroad as it appeared in the late 1960s

Coahuila–Texas
Structure	Mexico rail company	Mexico nearest community	United States rail company	United States nearest community	Notes
Union Pacific International Railroad Bridge	FXE	Piedras Negras	UP / BNSF	Eagle Pass	

Tamaulipas–Texas
Structure	Mexico rail company	Mexico nearest community	United States rail company	United States nearest community	Notes
Patrick J. Ottensmeyer International Railway Bridge	KCSM	Nuevo Laredo	KCS	Laredo	Formerly known as Texas Mexican Railway International Bridge, renamed in 2025.
Brownsville & Matamoros International Bridge	KCSM	Matamoros	UP	Brownsville	The road and rail bridges are adjacent, go by the same name, and are partially owned by the Union Pacific Railroad.

== Closed rail crossings ==
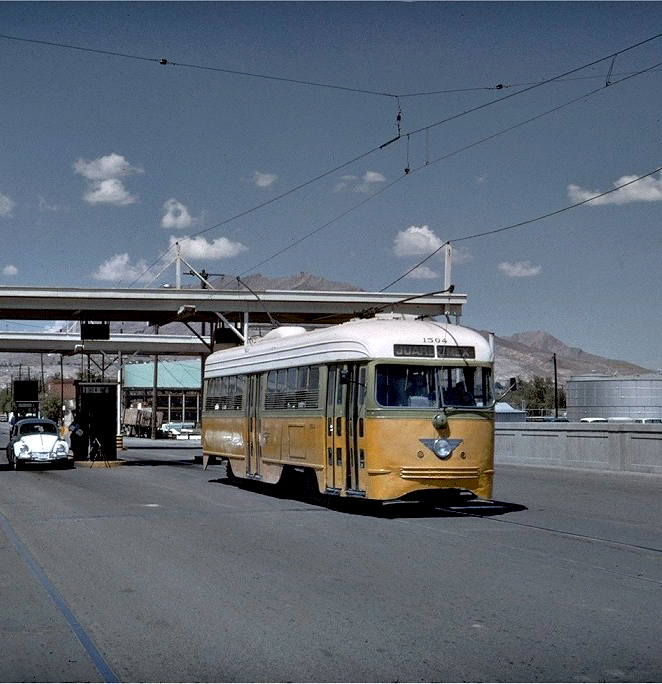
The El Paso City Lines (subsidiary of National City Lines) trolley leaves the border headed to Juárez in the 1960s

Baja California–California
Mexico rail company	Mexico nearest community	United States rail company	United States nearest community	Notes
BJRR	Lindero	PIRR	Division	The railroad line runs through Tunnel 4 across the border and the former Tunnel 3 to the south. Rail service over the border including Pacific Southwest Railway Museum's Ticket to Tecate passenger train was suspended in 2009 due to a fire in Tunnel 3. This section of the line is undergoing reconstruction, which includes the daylighting of Tunnel 3 and rebuilding Tunnel 4's west portal. This crossing lies along the San Diego and Arizona Eastern Railway's Desert Line.
Inter-Cal	Algodones	SP	Andrade	Southern Pacific-owned Inter-California Railroad ran through until the late 1950s, when the line between Algodones, Mexico, and Araz Jct. Connecting to the "Sunset Route" was shut down.
Sinaloa Cartel	Tijuana	Sinaloa Cartel	San Diego	Discovered 2006 and closed

Sonora–Arizona
Mexico rail company	Mexico nearest community	United States rail company	United States nearest community	Notes
FXE	Naco	EPSW	Naco	The Ferrocarril Naco-Cananea was built around 1900 as a mining railroad. The rail line used to lie between South Pratt Avenue and South Friend Drive in Arizona.
FXE	Agua Prieta	EPSW	Douglas	Rail tracks lie just to the west of Avenida Ferrocarril (Railway Avenue) in Agua Prieta and to the west of Pan American Avenue (US 191) in Douglas. The line was used by the Phelps Dodge Corporation for mineral transport. Jesús García died along this line in 1907.

Chihuahua–Texas
Structure	Mexico rail company	Mexico nearest community	United States rail company	United States nearest community	Notes
Paso del Norte Bridge, Stanton Street Bridge		Ciudad Juárez	National City Lines	El Paso	Trolley line ran through city streets, including the border crossing, until the late 1960s.

== Ferry crossings ==
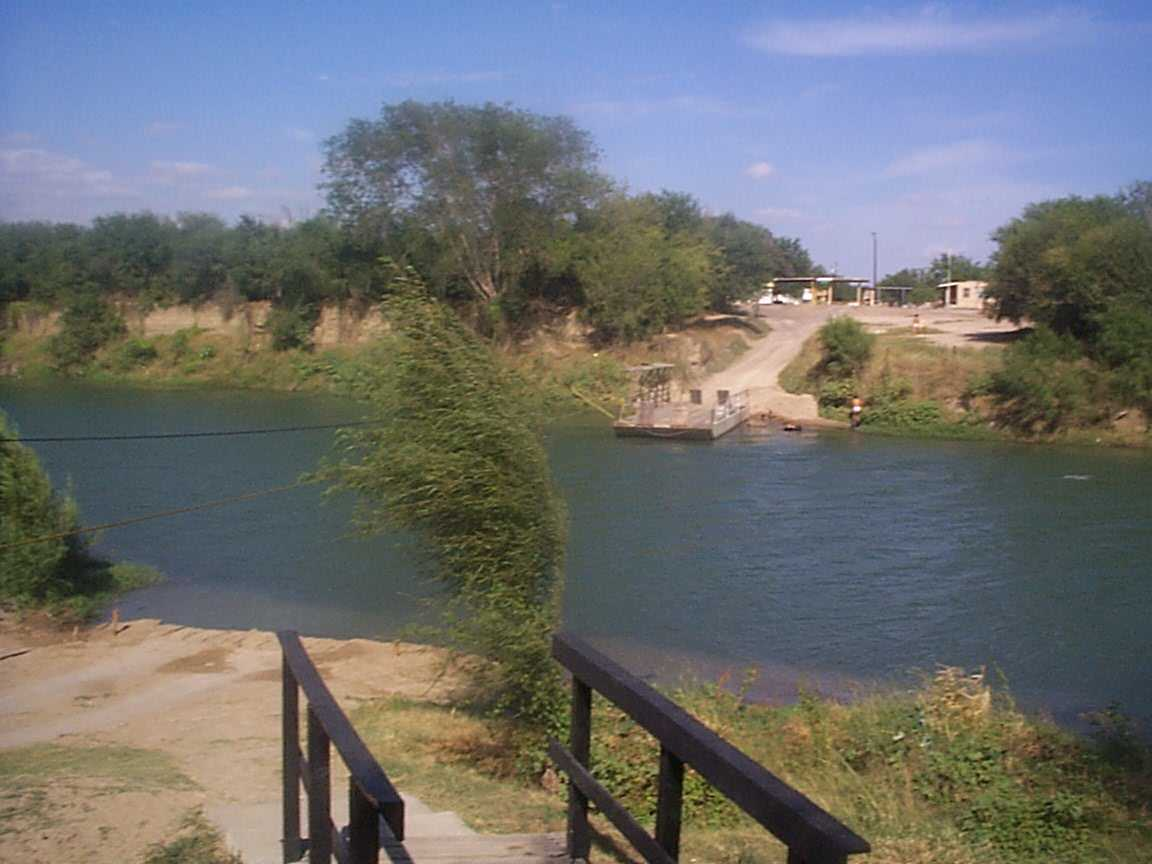
Hand-Pulled International Ferry at Los Ebanos, Texas, (view from Gustavo Díaz Ordaz, Tamaulipas)

Tamaulipas–Texas
Waterway	Ferry company	Mexico ferry terminal	United States ferry terminal	Notes
Rio Grande	Los Ebanos Ferry	Gustavo Díaz Ordaz	Los Ebanos	This is a hand-operated cable ferry.

Veracruz–Alabama
Waterway	Ferry company	Mexico ferry terminal	United States ferry terminal	Notes
Gulf of Mexico	CG Railway Ferrosur	Port of Coatzacoalcos in Coatzacoalcos	Terminal Railway Alabama State Docks in Mobile	MV Bali Sea and MV Banda Sea are train ferries that ply the 1,400-kilometre (870 mi) route carrying freight railcars.

== See also ==
- List of Canada–United States border crossings
- List of crossings of the Rio Grande
- Roosevelt Reservation
