= Texas State Highway 20 =

State highway in Texas

State Highway 20
- SH 20 highlighted in red

Route information
- Maintained by TxDOT
- Length: 78.061 mi (125.627 km)
- Existed: April 2, 1969–present

Major junctions
- West end: NM 460 / NM 478 in Anthony
- SH 178 in El Paso I-10 / US 85 / US 180 in El Paso; I-10 / US 180 in El Paso; I-110 / US 54 in El Paso US 62 in El Paso
- East end: I-10 in McNary

Location
- Country: United States
- State: Texas
- Counties: El Paso, Hudspeth

Highway system
- Highways in Texas; Interstate; US; State; Former; Toll; Loops; Spurs; FM/RM; Park; Rec
← I-20	→ SH 21

State Highway 20 (SH 20) is a 78.1-mile (125.7 km) highway maintained by the Texas Department of Transportation (TxDOT) that runs from New Mexico State Road 460 at the state line between Texas and New Mexico at Anthony in El Paso County to Interstate 10 at McNary in Hudspeth County. It largely follows a former alignment of U.S. Route 80. The route passes through the city of El Paso as well as suburban and rural farming communities along the Rio Grande. With the exception of a stretch north of central El Paso where the route crosses north of I-10, the route generally runs in a narrow belt between I-10 and the Rio Grande. The route has connections to every international border crossing with Mexico in the El Paso area and has important intersections with US 54, US 62, US 85, and US 180.

Until the late 1930s, the route designation belonged to a highway in central Texas along the route of present-day US 290. The current route predates the Texas highway system having been a portion of several historic auto trails. The route was included at the creation of the state system as part of SH 1. With the establishment of the U.S. numbered highway system, the route became US 80 and the SH 1 designation was eventually dropped. SH 20 was designated over the route when US 80 was relocated over I-10 before it too was decommissioned in western Texas.

== History ==
=== Current route ===
Before the state established its highway system, the route of SH 20 was used by many historic auto trails including the Dixie Overland Highway, the Old Spanish Trail, the Lee Highway, the Jefferson Davis National Highway, and the Bankhead Highway.

Historic SH 1

The current SH 20 was originally a part of the former SH 1, a route that from the current eastern terminus of the present route continued on through Van Horn, Odessa, Midland, Abilene, Fort Worth, and Dallas before entering Arkansas at Texarkana. This route was also one of the original routes planned in 1917, and remained largely unchanged until the end of the 1930s.

US 80

In 1927, US 80 was designated over the route of SH 1 from the New Mexico state line at Anthony to Dallas and then proceeding east to the Louisiana state line east of Waskom. The highway carried both the US 80 and SH 1 designations until the 1939 general redescription of the state highway system when SH 1 was decommissioned outside the city of Dallas. In 1944, the full length of US 80 within Texas was designated as the Veterans of World War II Highway. US 80 was relocated over I-10 through El Paso on April 2, 1969, and its former route was then renamed SH 20. US 80 was decommissioned west of Dallas on August 28, 1991.

== Route description ==
SH 20 begins where NM 460 (Co-signed with NM 478), also called Anthony Drive, reaches the state line between Anthony, New Mexico and Anthony, Texas in the El Paso area's Upper Valley. The route proceeds south through Anthony along Main Street passing Federal Correctional Institution, La Tuna. The route then enters Vinton where it becomes Doniphan Drive. Further south in Canutillo the route intersects Loop 375, El Paso's beltway. After entering the city of El Paso, the route intersects SH 178 which connects the route via NM 136 to the international border with Mexico south of Santa Teresa, New Mexico. Further south, SH 20 turns off of Doniphan Drive and onto Mesa Street and soon after crosses the I-10 freeway which also carries US 85 and US 180 at this point. The route continues to the southeast passing through the foothills of the Franklin Mountains. The route then passes the University of Texas at El Paso and Sun Bowl Stadium before entering central El Paso.

In central El Paso, the route crosses I-10 and US 180 again and then soon after turns northeast on Texas Avenue where the route crosses Santa Fe and Stanton Streets leading to the Paso del Norte International Bridge and Good Neighbor International Bridge to Ciudad Juárez. SH 20 then turns east along Alameda Avenue. The route then crosses Loop 478 before crossing the mostly unsigned I-110 and US 54 at the Patriot Freeway which leads to the international Bridge of the Americas. The route crosses US 62 at Paisano Dr. before the route turns southeast at Ascarate Park and enters the Lower Valley.

At Zaragoza Road, which leads to the Ysleta-Zaragoza International Bridge, the route intersects FM 258 and passes Ysleta Mission in the Ysleta del Sur Pueblo Native American reservation. The route crosses Loop 375 again before entering Socorro where the route continues along Alameda. Further to the southeast at Clint, SH 20 crosses FM 1110 to San Elizario. In Fabens, where SH 20 is known as Main Street, the route crosses FM 76 which leads toward the Fabens-Caseta International Bridge. The route passes through Tornillo as Alameda Avenue again before leaving El Paso County.

In Hudspeth County, the route intersects Spur 148 which passes through central Fort Hancock. A short distance later, the route intersects FM 1088 which connects Fort Hancock to the Fort Hancock – El Porvenir International Bridge. At McNary, the route intersects FM 2217 which continues along the Lower Valley, and then terminates at I-10.

== Major intersections ==
County	Location	mi	km	Destinations	Notes
El Paso	Anthony	0.000	0.000	NM 460 north (Anthony Drive) to NM 478	continuation into New Mexico
El Paso	Anthony	0.041	0.066	FM 1905 west (Washington Street)	west end of FM 1905 overlap
El Paso	Anthony	0.138	0.222	FM 1905 east (Franklin Street) to I-10	east end of FM 1905 overlap
El Paso	Anthony	0.585	0.941	Spur 6 east (Wildcat Drive) to I-10	
El Paso	Vinton	2.852	4.590	To I-10 / Vinton Road (Spur 37) – Vinton, Westway	
El Paso	Canutillo	5.888	9.476	FM 259 west / La Union Avenue	
El Paso	Canutillo	6.372	10.255	Loop 375 east (Talbot Drive) to I-10	
El Paso	El Paso	7.456	11.999	Spur 16 north to I-10 / Loop 375	
El Paso	El Paso	8.413	13.539	SH 178 (Artcraft Road) to I-10	interchange
El Paso	El Paso	11.732	18.881	I-10 / US 85 / US 180 – Las Cruces	I-10 exit 11
El Paso	El Paso	19.667	31.651	I-10 (US 180)	I-10 exit 19
El Paso	El Paso	19.996	32.180	To Fed. 45 / Mesa Street	
El Paso	El Paso	22.464	36.152	Copia Street (Loop 478)	
El Paso	El Paso	23.951	38.545	US 62 west (Paisano Drive)	traffic circle; west end of US 62 overlap
El Paso	El Paso	24.005	38.632	US 62 east (Paisano Drive)	traffic circle; east end of US 62 overlap
El Paso	El Paso	24.710	39.767	Clark Drive	former FM 1505 north
El Paso	El Paso	25.651	41.281	FM 76 east (Delta Drive)	
El Paso	El Paso	32.133	51.713	Zaragoza Road (FM 258 east)	
El Paso	El Paso	33.356	53.681	Loop 375 (Americas Avenue) to I-10	Loop 375 exit 47
El Paso	Clint	41.350	66.546	FM 1110 (Clint) to I-10 – San Elizario Mission	
El Paso	Fabens	47.999	77.247	FM 258 west	
El Paso	Fabens	48.558	78.147	FM 76 (Island Road) to I-10 / FM 793 – Port of Entry	
El Paso		52.617	84.679	FM 3380 (M.F. Aguilera Road)	interchange
Hudspeth	Fort Hancock	72.044	115.944	Spur 148 to I-10	
Hudspeth		72.860	117.257	FM 1088 south – Port of Entry	
Hudspeth		77.009	123.934	FM 192	
Hudspeth		78.061	125.627	I-10 – El Paso, Sierra Blanca	I-10 exit 78
1.000 mi = 1.609 km; 1.000 km = 0.621 mi
