= U.S. Route 85 in Texas =

Highway in Texas

U.S. Highway 85
- US 85 highlighted in red

Route information
- Maintained by TxDOT
- Length: 5.630 mi (9.061 km) The official length does not include portions concurrent with I-10 or US 62
- Existed: 1946–present

Major junctions
- South end: US 62 at the U.S.-Mexico border between El Paso and Ciudad Juárez, Chih.
- US 62 in El Paso; I-10 / US 180
- North end: I-10 / US 85 / US 180 at Anthony

Location
- Country: United States
- State: Texas
- Counties: El Paso

Highway system
- United States Numbered Highway System; List; Special; Divided; Highways in Texas; Interstate; US; State; Former; Toll; Loops; Spurs; FM/RM; Park; Rec
← SH 84	→ SH 85

U.S. Highway 85 or US 85 is a route in the system of United States Numbered Highways maintained by the Texas Department of Transportation (TxDOT). The Texas portion of US 85 is located entirely within El Paso County beginning at the U.S.-Mexico border between the city of El Paso and Ciudad Juárez, Chihuahua. The approximately 20-mile (32 km) route briefly overlays US 62 in downtown El Paso, then traverses north along the city's west side before merging with the combined route of Interstate 10 and US 180. The route then follows I-10 and US 180 through the towns of Vinton and Anthony before crossing the New Mexico state line into the town of Anthony, New Mexico, in Doña Ana County.

US 85 was extended south into Texas in 1946. Prior to the completion of I-10 in El Paso, US 85 followed the former route of US 80 which is now SH 20.

== Route description ==
US 85 begins at the Mexico–United States border between El Paso and Ciudad Juárez at the Paso del Norte International Bridge for northbound traffic and the Good Neighbor International Bridge for southbound traffic. The international bridges overpass without directly intersecting Loop 375. The highway follows the one-way couplet of South El Paso Street northbound and South Stanton Street southbound to Paisano Drive. The route is concurrent with US 62 from the border to Paisano Drive, where US 85 turns west while US 62 turns east. One block west of El Paso Street, US 85 intersects South Santa Fe Street, which connects to Loop 375. West of downtown, the route becomes a freeway, paralleling the Rio Grande and the tracks of the Union Pacific Railroad and the BNSF Railway west of I-10 and Loop 375. After merging with I-10 and US 180, US 85 remains concurrent with them for the remainder of its length in Texas in greater El Paso's west side and upper valley regions. US 85 intersects SH 20 at Mesa Street. At Artcraft Road, the route intersects SH 178, which, together with New Mexico State Road 136, connects the route to the Santa Teresa Port of Entry. The route then intersects the northern segment of Loop 375, providing connection to Canutillo and Fort Bliss. The highway then leaves El Paso and intersects Spur 37 in Vinton just west of Westway. In Anthony, the route intersects FM 1905 before crossing the state line into New Mexico.

== History ==
US 85 was one of the original U.S. Numbered Highways established by the American Association of State Highway Officials. The first AASHO route log, published in 1927, did not place US 85 in Texas but instead as terminating in Las Cruces, New Mexico. AASHO extended the route south to El Paso in 1946.

The original alignment of US 85 in Texas was entirely concurrent with the former route of US 80 beginning at Texas Ave. and following Mesa St. and then Doniphan Dr. to the New Mexico state line along the current SH 20. US 85 was relocated to its current alignment in 1974, partially following the former routing of U.S. Route 80 (Alt.) after the completion of I-10 in El Paso. The current local TxDOT map shows US 85 terminating on Paisano Dr. at US 62 at S. El Paso St. with no concurrent along US 62 to the border. However, the present route log of the American Association of State Highway and Transportation Officials, as AASHO is now known, shows US 85 joining US 62 to the border.

== Major intersections ==
The entire route is in El Paso County.

Location	mi	km	Exit	Destinations	Notes
El Paso	0.00	0.00		Avenida Benito Juárez	One-way street, inbound access only; continuation from Mexico; south end of US 62 overlap; southern terminus of US 85, western terminus of US 62
El Paso	0.5	0.80		US 62 east (Paisano Drive east)	North end of US 62 overlap;
El Paso				Spur 1966 east	Western terminus of Spur 1966
El Paso				Executive Center Boulevard to I-10 (US 180)	
El Paso			—	To NM 273 (McNutt Road)	East end of freeway; westbound exit and southbound entrance
El Paso			—	Sunland Park Drive to I-10 east (US 180 east)	Westbound exit only
El Paso			—	Loop 375 east	East end of Loop 375 overlap; eastbound left exit and westbound left entrance; Loop 375 exit 66
El Paso			—	Racetrack Drive	Eastbound exit and westbound entrance
El Paso			13	Sunland Park Drive	Exit numbers follow I-10 mileage; no westbound exit
El Paso			12	Resler Drive	Westbound exit and eastbound entrance
El Paso			11	SH 20 (Mesa Street)	
El Paso			—	Loop 375 ends / I-10 / US 180 east	South end of I-10/US 180 overlap; west end of Loop 375 overlap; clockwise terminus of Loop 375; eastbound left exit and northbound left entrance; I-10 exit 13
see I-10
Anthony	19.8	31.9		I-10 west (US 85 north / US 180 west)	Continuation into New Mexico
1.000 mi = 1.609 km; 1.000 km = 0.621 mi: Concurrency terminus; Incomplete access

== See also ==
U.S. Route 85
Previous state: Terminus	Texas	Next state: New Mexico
