= Texas State Highway 178 =

Highway in Texas

State Highway 178
- SH 178, highlighted in red

Route information
- Maintained by TxDOT
- Length: 2.860 mi (4.603 km)
- Existed: 1991–present

Major junctions
- West end: NM 136 in Santa Teresa, NM
- SH 20 in El Paso
- East end: I-10 / US 85 / US 180 in El Paso

Location
- Country: United States
- State: Texas
- Counties: El Paso

Highway system
- Highways in Texas; Interstate; US; State; Former; Toll; Loops; Spurs; FM/RM; Park; Rec
← SH 177	→ SH 179

State Highway 178 (SH 178) is a Texas state highway in the city of El Paso in El Paso County maintained by the Texas Department of Transportation (TxDOT). The 3.0-mile (4.8 km) route designated in 1991 connects New Mexico State Road 136 at the New Mexico state line between El Paso and Santa Teresa, New Mexico, to a freeway carrying Interstate 10, U.S. Route 85, and U.S. Route 180 on the west side of El Paso. The route together with NM 136 is a major urban roadway connecting an international border crossing with I-10. The route also has an important intersection with SH 20.

The route's numerical designation was previously assigned to a road in the Texas Panhandle during the 1930s. An extension to the current route potentially doubling its length was considered and rejected in recent years.

== History ==
=== Hartley and Moore counties ===
SH 178 was previously proposed on October 25, 1932 as a connector route between the cities of Hartley and Dumas in Hartley and Moore counties in the Texas Panhandle. By 1936, the Hartley County portion had been completed with the Moore County portion following by 1940. On June 21, 1938, SH 178 was cancelled, as the route became part of SH 152.

=== El Paso County ===
The current route in El Paso was designated on June 26, 1991. TxDOT proposed extending the route an additional 3 miles (5 km) to Loop 375 on June 30, 1994, but those plans were dropped on October 25, 2007.

== Route description ==
SH 178 is a major urban thoroughfare on El Paso's west side that is locally known as Artcraft Road The route is a four to six-lane divided highway beginning at NM 136, or Pete V. Domenici International Highway, at the New Mexico state line between El Paso and Santa Teresa in Doña Ana County, New Mexico. The route proceeds east along Artcraft Road crossing the Rio Grande shortly before intersecting SH 20 at Doniphan Drive. The route then continues east ending at the combined I-10, US 85, and US 180 freeway where the roadway continues eastward as Paseo del Norte Road.

SH 178 and NM 136 together form a connection between the Santa Teresa-San Jerónimo, Chih. Port of Entry and I-10 bypassing Sunland Park, New Mexico, Santa Teresa, and central El Paso.

== Major intersections ==
The entire route is in El Paso, El Paso County.

mi	km	Destinations	Notes
0	0.0	NM 136 – Santa Teresa Port of Entry	Western terminus at New Mexico state line
0.3	0.48	Westside Drive	At-grade intersection; future interchange
1.2	1.9	Upper Valley Road	At-grade intersection; future interchange
1.8	2.9	SH 20 (Doniphan Drive) – Socorro, Canutillo	West end of freeway
2.2	3.5	Frontage Road	Westbound exit and eastbound entrance
2.7	4.3	Santiago Street	Westbound exit only; east end of freeway
3.0	4.8	I-10 / US 85 / US 180 – Socorro, Anthony	I-10 exit 8; eastern terminus; future stack interchange
1.000 mi = 1.609 km; 1.000 km = 0.621 mi: Incomplete access
