= Alamo Alto, Texas =

Unincorporated community in Texas, US

Alamo Alto
- Unincorporated community
- Location within Texas
- Coordinates: 31.4051216°N 106.0238610°W
- Country: United States
- State: Texas
- County: El Paso
- Elevation: 3,570 ft (1,088 m)

Alamo Alto is an unincorporated community in El Paso County, Texas, United States. Situated on Texas State Highway 20, it was settled by 1931. The community slowly grew, and by 2000, the population was 25.
