= Texas State Highway Spur 1966 =

State highway in Texas

State Highway Spur 1966

Route information
- Maintained by TxDOT
- Length: 0.3 mi (480 m)
- Existed: 2012–present

Major junctions
- West end: US 85 in El Paso
- Loop 375 in El Paso
- East end: Schuster Avenue in El Paso

Location
- Country: United States
- State: Texas
- Counties: El Paso

Highway system
- Highways in Texas; Interstate; US; State; Former; Toll; Loops; Spurs; FM/RM; Park; Rec
← FM 1965	→ FM 1966

State Highway Spur 1966 (Spur 1966) is a spur route in the U.S. state of Texas, maintained by the Texas Department of Transportation (TxDOT). The route, located in El Paso County on the west side of the city of El Paso, links U.S. Highway 85 (US 85) across Interstate 10 (I-10) to the campus of the University of Texas at El Paso (UTEP). The spur's numerical designation commemorates the championship won by UTEP, then known as Texas Western College, in the 1966 NCAA Men's Division I Basketball Tournament.

== Route description ==
The 0.3-mile (482.8 m) spur begins at US 85 (Paisano Drive) and proceeds to the northeast over a bridge crossing I-10 before ending at Schuster Avenue. The route replaced the nearby Yandell Drive overpass across I-10, which was demolished.

The route is intended to provide better access between UTEP and nearby medical facilities, provide an additional route along US 85 between the campus and downtown El Paso, and allow improved access to businesses along State Highway 20 (SH 20, Mesa Street). The route is also designed to alleviate heavy traffic encroachment into nearby residential neighborhoods, and foster a more pedestrian-friendly environment for the UTEP campus. TxDOT planning for the spur includes accommodation, not only of vehicular traffic, but also bicycle and pedestrian traffic.

== History ==
Spur 1966 was originally designated on February 23, 2012 as Spur 73. To avoid conflict, this was changed to Spur 1966 on March 29, 2012. The project was expected to have cost between $50–60 million, and was opened to traffic in early 2015.

The spur's unusual designation—it is the only four-digit state highway spur in Texas—was chosen to honor the historic 1966 NCAA championship of the 1965–66 Texas Western Miners men's basketball team as UTEP and the UTEP Miners were previously known. The Miners made history by playing the NCAA basketball championships' first-ever entirely African-American starting lineup inspiring the film Glory Road.

== Major intersections ==
The entire route is in El Paso, El Paso County.

mi	km	Destinations	Notes
0.00	0.00	US 85 (Paisano Drive)	Western terminus
0.10	0.16	Loop 375 (Border West Expressway)	interchange; Loop 375 exit 62
0.15	0.24	I-10 / US 180	Bridge over I-10/US 180 only; no access is provided to freeway
0.30	0.48	Schuster Avenue	Roundabout; eastern terminus
1.000 mi = 1.609 km; 1.000 km = 0.621 mi: Closed/former
