= New Mexico State Road 273 =

State highway in New Mexico, United States

State Road 273
- McNutt Road
- NM 273 highlighted in red

Route information
- Maintained by NMDOT
- Length: 14.015 mi (22.555 km)

Major junctions
- South end: Anapra Road at the Texas state line in Sunland Park
- North end: NM 28 near La Union

Location
- Country: United States
- State: New Mexico
- Counties: Doña Ana

Highway system
- New Mexico State Highway System; Interstate; US; State; Scenic
← NM 272	→ NM 275

State Road 273 (NM 273) is a 14.015-mile-long (22.555 km), paved state highway in Doña Ana County in the U.S. state of New Mexico. NM 273's southern terminus is a continuation as Anapra Road in Sunland Park at the Texas state line, just west of the Anapra Road Rio Grande bridge. NM 273's northern terminus is southeast of La Union at the road's junction with NM 28. NM 273 is also known as McNutt Road.

== Route description ==
The highway begins in Sunland Park at the Texas state line, just west of the Rio Grande river. The road travels from south to north, generally following the flow of the Rio Grande river. NM 273 starts out as two-lane highway for the first 0.37 miles (0.60 km), at which point it widens to four lanes. Shortly after the intersection with NM 498 (Racetrack Drive), the road becomes a 5-lane highway with a center turning lane. The road travels by residential and commercial areas of the town of Sunland Park, skirting it from the east for the next 4 miles. After 3.35 miles (5.39 km) NM 273 passes by the campus of Doña Ana Community College. Continuing in the general northwest direction, the highway passes Riverside Elementary School at a 4-mile mark. After leaving the community of Sunland Park, NM 273 enters the town of Santa Teresa, passes Santa Teresa Middle School, and turns farther northwest, further deviating from the flow of the Rio Grande. After approximately 8.5 miles (13.7 km) the road turns north and shortly after intersects NM 136. After the junction, the road narrows to two lanes and remains a 2-lane highway for the remainder of its journey. NM 273 continues north for about 2.6 miles (4.2 km), skirting the fields and pecan orchards of Mesilla Valley from the west, then turns east. After about one mile, the road turns north, and almost immediately east again, and reaches its northern terminus at intersection with NM 28.

== History ==
NM 273 first appeared on New Mexico Official Road Map published in 1950. Originally, its northern terminus was farther north, at the New Mexico-Texas border, east of La Union, past the current intersection of NM 182 and NM 28, at the east terminus of NM 183. The road followed Alvarez Road to La Union before turning east and following modern day NM 182, then briefly running north concurrently with NM 28, and lastly following NM 183. The current stretch of NM 273 east of Alvarez Road was known as NM 319 as can be seen on 1950s maps. In 1988 the New Mexico Department of Transportation (NMDOT) went through a radical road renumbering program, and NM 273 was re-routed over the path of NM 319, while Alvarez Road was eliminated from the state control, and the northern portion of NM 273 between NM 28 and La Union was designated as NM 182, whereas a segment east of NM 28 was designated as NM 183 as can be seen from 1995 map.

== Major intersections ==
The entire route is in Doña Ana County.

Location	mi	km	Destinations	Notes
Sunland Park	0.000	0.000	Anapra Road	Continues south as Anapra Road at the Texas state line
Sunland Park	0.919	1.479	NM 498 north – El Paso	Southern terminus of NM 498
Santa Teresa	6.592	10.609	NM 184 east – El Paso	Western terminus of NM 184
Santa Teresa	9.320	14.999	NM 136 – El Paso, Santa Teresa Port of Entry	
La Union	14.015	22.555	NM 28 – Canutillo, Las Cruces	Northern terminus
1.000 mi = 1.609 km; 1.000 km = 0.621 mi
