= New Mexico State Road 182 =

State highway in New Mexico, United States

State Road 182
- Mercantil Avenue
- NM 182 highlighted in red

Route information
- Maintained by NMDOT
- Length: 1.306 mi (2.102 km)
- Existed: c. 2000–present

Major junctions
- West end: End of state maintenance in La Union
- East end: NM 28 near La Union

Location
- Country: United States
- State: New Mexico
- Counties: Doña Ana

Highway system
- New Mexico State Highway System; Interstate; US; State; Scenic
← NM 181	→ NM 183

State Road 182 (NM 182) is a 1.306-mile-long (2.102 km), paved, two-lane state highway in Doña Ana County in the U.S. state of New Mexico. NM 182 western terminus is in La Union at the road's end at La Union Townsite, and the eastern terminus is at the road's junction with NM 28 within the La Union community. NM 182 is also known as Mercantil Avenue.

== Route description ==
The highway begins at the junction with NM 28 east of community of La Union. The road heads west through pecan orchards and fields of Mesilla Valley for 0.57 miles (0.92 km) before turning southwest. The highway continues to follow Mercantil Avenue until it ends at La Union Townsite.

== History ==
The section occupied by modern day NM 182 was initially built in 1950 as a portion of NM 273 connecting La Union with El Paso. In the late 1990s to early 2000s this stretch was removed from NM 273 and was designated as NM 182. After the split, the length of the highway was 2.033 miles (3.272 km) and the road extended to NM 416 (Casad Road) down Alvarez Road. After NM 416 was decommissioned in mid-2000s NM 182 was shortened down to its current length and rerouted away from Alvarez Road.

== Major intersections ==
The entire route is in La Union, Doña Ana County.

mi	km	Destinations	Notes
0.000	0.000	End of state maintenance	Western terminus
1.306	2.102	NM 28 – Canutillo, Las Cruces	Eastern terminus
1.000 mi = 1.609 km; 1.000 km = 0.621 mi
