= McNary, Texas =

- Unincorporated Community
- Location within Texas
- Coordinates: 31°14′53″N 105°47′47″W
- Country: United States
- State: Texas
- County: Hudspeth
- Elevation: 3,576 ft (1,090 m)
- Time zone: UTC-6 (Central (CST))
  - Summer (DST): UTC-5 (CDT)
- ZIP codes: 79839
- Area code: 915
- GNIS feature ID: 1362526

McNary is an unincorporated community (pop. ~250) at the intersection of Interstate 10 and State Highway 20. It is two miles from the Rio Grande and 23 miles west of Sierra Blanca in southwestern Hudspeth County, Texas, United States.

The area was initially settled in 1921, and named Nulo. The town was renamed McNary, after James G. McNary (1877-1962), a local businessman, in September 1923 when the Galveston, Harrisburg and San Antonio Railway established a station in the area. It served as a shipping point for cotton from the Algodon Plantation.
