= New Mexico State Road 137 =

State highway in New Mexico, United States

State Road 137

Route information
- Maintained by NMDOT
- Length: 55.007 mi (88.525 km)

Major junctions
- South end: Dog Canyon Road at the Texas/ New Mexico border
- North end: US 285 near Carlsbad

Location
- Country: United States
- State: New Mexico
- Counties: Eddy

Highway system
- New Mexico State Highway System; Interstate; US; State; Scenic
← NM 136	→ NM 138

State Road 137 (NM 137) is a 55-mile-long (89 km) state highway in the US state of New Mexico. NM 137's southern terminus is at the Texas–New Mexico state line, where it becomes Dog Canyon Road as it enters Guadalupe Mountains National Park. Its northern terminus is at U.S. Route 285 (US 285) northwest of Carlsbad.

== Major intersections ==
The entire route is in Eddy County.

Location	mi	km	Destinations	Notes
	0.000	0.000	Dog Canyon Road	Southern terminus at Texas–New Mexico state line
	55.007	88.525	US 285	Northern terminus
1.000 mi = 1.609 km; 1.000 km = 0.621 mi
