= Los Ebanos, Hidalgo County, Texas =

Los Ebanos, Texas
- Census-designated place
- St. Michael the Archangel Catholic Church

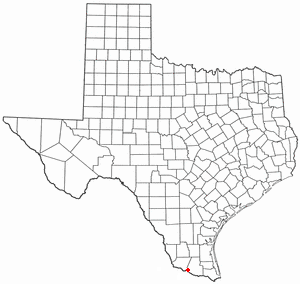
- Location of Los Ebanos, Texas

- Coordinates: 26°14′37″N 98°33′40″W
- Country: United States of America
- State: Texas
- County: Hidalgo

Area
  - Total: 0.58 sq mi (1.5 km^{2})
  - Land: 0.58 sq mi (1.5 km^{2})
  - Water: 0 sq mi (0.0 km^{2})
- Elevation: 141 ft (43 m)

Population (2020)
  - Total: 239
  - Density: 410/sq mi (160/km^{2})
- Time zone: UTC-6 (Central (CST))
  - Summer (DST): UTC-5 (CDT)
- ZIP code: 78565
- Area code: 956
- FIPS code: 48-44104
- GNIS feature ID: 1340592

Los Ebanos is a census-designated place (CDP) in Hidalgo County, Texas, United States. The population was 239 at the 2020 United States Census. It is part of the McAllen-Edinburg-Mission metropolitan area. The city is named after the Texas Ebony (Ebenopsis ebano) that anchors the Los Ebanos Ferry.

== Geography ==
Los Ebanos is located at 26°14′37″N 98°33′40″W (26.243665, -98.561039).

According to the United States Census Bureau, the CDP has a total area of 0.6 square miles (1.6 km^{2}), all land. Los Ebanos also serves as an official border crossing between the United States and Mexico via the Los Ebanos-Diaz Ordaz Ferry. The hand-operated cable ferry provides transport between Los Ebanos and Gustavo Díaz Ordaz, Tamaulipas.

== Demographics ==
Historical population
Census	Pop.	Note	%±
2000	403		—
2010	335		−16.9%
2020	239		−28.7%
U.S. Decennial Census; 1850–1900 1910; 1920 1930 1940; 1950 1960 1970; 1980 1990 2000; 2010 2020

Los Ebanos first appeared as a census designated place in the 2000 U.S. census.

=== 2020 census ===
Los Ebanos CDP (Hidalgo County), Texas – Racial and ethnic composition Note: the US Census treats Hispanic/Latino as an ethnic category. This table excludes Latinos from the racial categories and assigns them to a separate category. Hispanics/Latinos may be of any race.
Race / Ethnicity (NH = Non-Hispanic)	Pop 2000	Pop 2010	Pop 2020	% 2000	% 2010	% 2020
White alone (NH)	8	6	6	1.99%	1.79%	2.51%
Black or African American alone (NH)	0	0	0	0.00%	0.00%	0.00%
Native American or Alaska Native alone (NH)	0	0	0	0.00%	0.00%	0.00%
Asian alone (NH)	0	0	0	0.00%	0.00%	0.00%
Native Hawaiian or Pacific Islander alone (NH)	0	0	0	0.00%	0.00%	0.00%
Other race alone (NH)	0	0	1	0.00%	0.00%	0.42%
Mixed race or Multiracial (NH)	0	0	1	0.00%	0.00%	0.42%
Hispanic or Latino (any race)	395	329	231	98.01%	98.21%	96.65%
Total	403	335	239	100.00%	100.00%	100.00%

As of the census of 2000, there were 403 people, 135 households, and 100 families residing in the CDP. The population density was 711.9 inhabitants per square mile (274.9/km^{2}). There were 168 housing units at an average density of 296.8 per square mile (114.6/km^{2}). The racial makeup of the CDP was 97.02% White, 0.25% African American, 1.99% from other races, and 0.74% from two or more races. Hispanic or Latino of any race were 98.01% of the population.

There were 135 households, out of which 28.9% had children under the age of 18 living with them, 48.9% were married couples living together, 20.7% had a female householder with no husband present, and 25.2% were non-families. 23.7% of all households were made up of individuals, and 13.3% had someone living alone who was 65 years of age or older. The average household size was 2.99 and the average family size was 3.59.

In the CDP, the population was spread out, with 25.6% under the age of 18, 12.9% from 18 to 24, 20.6% from 25 to 44, 20.6% from 45 to 64, and 20.3% who were 65 years of age or older. The median age was 36 years. For every 100 females, there were 73.0 males. For every 100 females age 18 and over, there were 72.4 males.

The median income for a household in the CDP was $7,066, and the median income for a family was $7,692. Males had a median income of $28,750 versus $37,500 for females. The per capita income for the CDP was $6,240. About 64.7% of families and 72.6% of the population were below the poverty line, including 89.7% of those under age 18 and 72.6% of those age 65 or over.

== Education ==
Los Ebanos is served by the La Joya Independent School District. The zoned schools for residents are Sam Fordyce Elementary School, Lorenzo de Zavala Middle School, and La Joya High School.

In addition, South Texas Independent School District operates magnet schools that serve the community.
