= Los Ebanos Ferry =

Cable ferry between Texas and Mexico

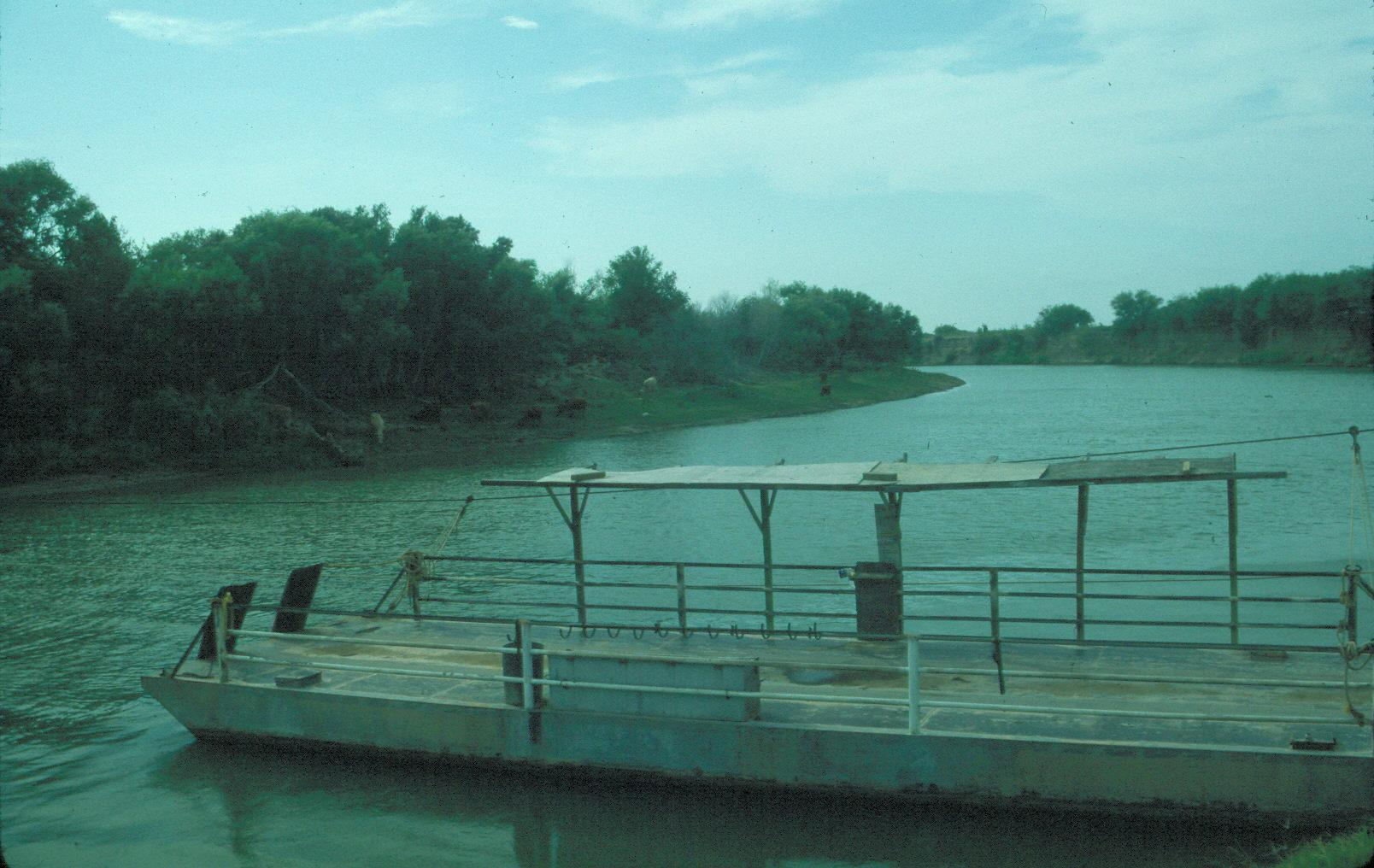
The hand-operated ferry at Los Ebanos, Texas.

The Los Ebanos Ferry or El Chalán, formally known as the Los Ebanos-Diaz Ordaz Ferry, is a hand-operated cable ferry that travels across the Rio Grande between Los Ebanos, Texas, and Gustavo Díaz Ordaz, Tamaulipas. It is the last of its kind along the entire stretch of the Rio Grande. The city of Los Ebanos was named after the Texas Ebony (Ebenopsis ebano) that anchors the ferry.

The ferry was first opened in 1950. It is the only remaining international ferry operation on the U.S.-Mexico border.

The crossing is occasionally closed when river levels are high, such as in 2015.

== Border crossing ==
Los Ebanos Texas Port of Entry
- Hand-Pulled International Ferry at Los Ebanos, Texas

Location
- Country: United States
- Location: 200 Flores St, Los Ebanos, Texas 78565 (Los Ebanos Ferry)
- Coordinates: 26.23972°N 98.563693°W

Details
- Opened: 1950

Statistics
- 2005 Cars: 32,935
- 2005 Trucks: 0
- Pedestrians: 38,759

Website
- http://www.cbp.gov/xp/cgov/toolbox/contacts/ports/tx/2307.xml

The Los Ebanos Port of Entry is the U.S. Customs and Border Protection facility that is used to inspect passengers and vehicles entering the US from Gustavo Díaz Ordaz, Tamaulipas via the Los Ebanos Ferry. A new border station was built in 2011.

The port of entry has been the site of occasional seizures of marijuana found hidden in vehicle tires.

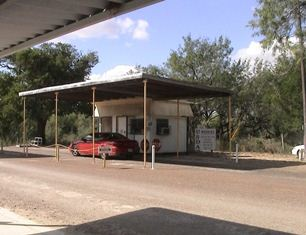
Outbound inspection facility at Los Ebanos in 2009

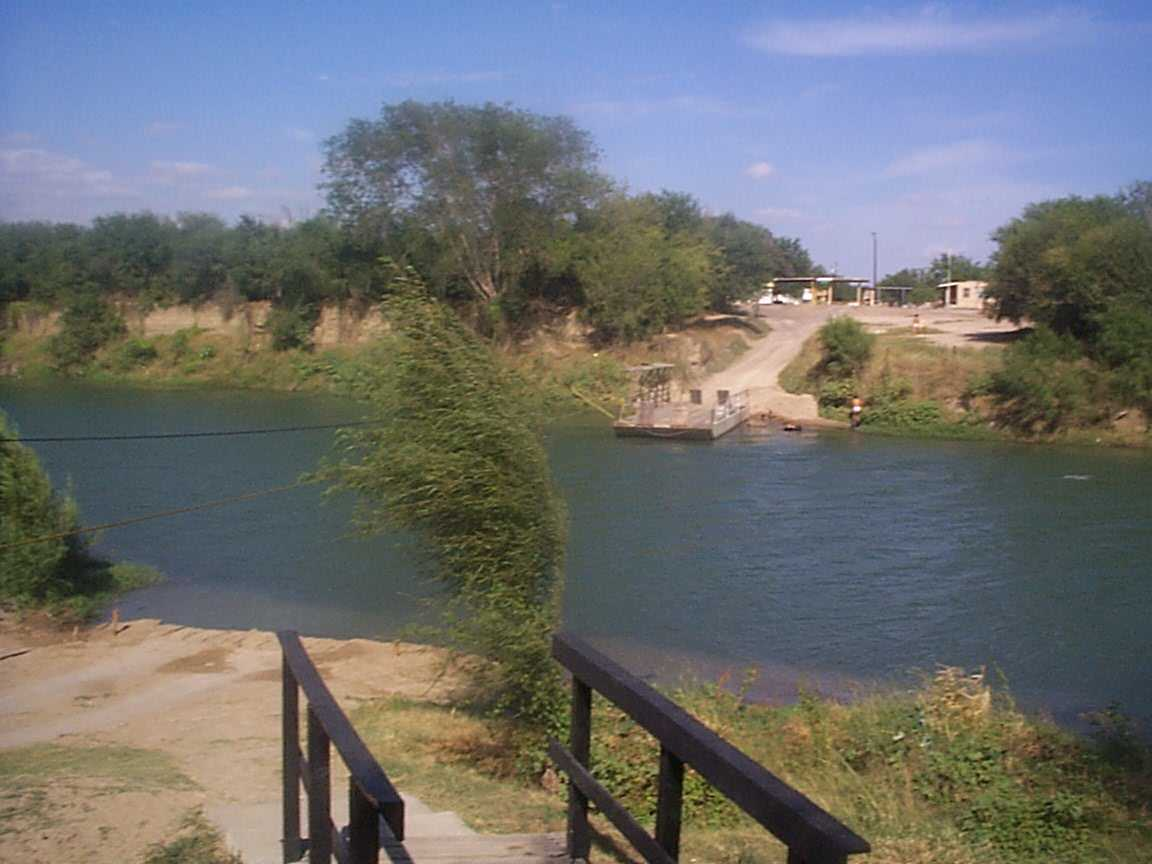
Los Ebanos Ferry as seen from Mexico in 1999. The US Border Inspection Station is on the opposite shore
