= Tornillo–Guadalupe International Bridge =

Tornillo-Guadalupe International Bridge
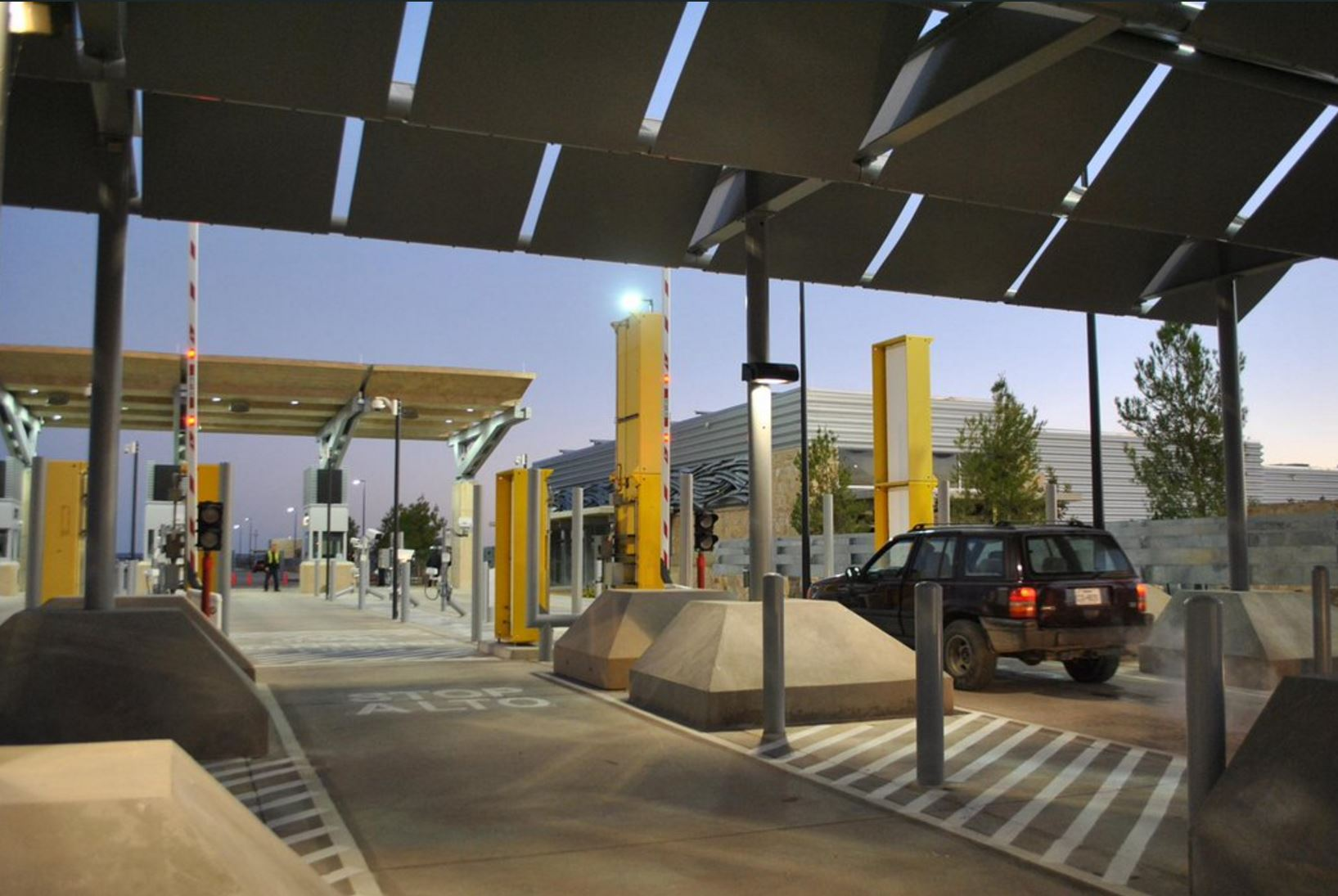
- Marcelino Serna Port of Entry
- Coordinates: 31°25′58.3″N 106°8′52.5″W
- Crosses: Rio Grande
- Locale: 1400 Lower Island Rd. (FM 3380); Tornillo, Texas 79853
- Website: www.cbp.gov/contact/ports/tornillo-texas-2404

Characteristics
- Width: 6 lanes

History
- Opened: 2016

Location
- Interactive map of Tornillo-Guadalupe International Bridge

The Tornillo–Guadalupe International Bridge is an international bridge which crosses the Rio Grande connecting the United States–Mexico border towns of Tornillo, Texas, US, and Guadalupe, Chihuahua, Mexico. The bridge was built in 2016 to replace and upgrade the Fabens–Caseta International Bridge, located a short distance away, effectively bypassing it.

== History ==
Construction of the Port of Entry began in July 2011, and the facilities were ready at the end of 2013. However, the Mexican side of the crossing suffered delays due to lack of funding; construction on the Mexican side of the new bridge finally began in January 2014, with customs inspection facilities and road infrastructure still pending.

The port was renamed the Marcelino Serna Port of Entry in April 2017. Marcelino Serna was an undocumented Mexican immigrant who later became one of the most decorated Texan veterans of World War I.

== Border crossing ==
The Marcelino Serna Port of Entry opened on November 17, 2014. The new crossing is built around a six-lane bridge about 1,800 ft (550 m) west of the previous two-lane Fabens–Caseta International Bridge and can accommodate vehicular, pedestrian and commercial traffic.

== Detention facilities ==
The U.S. Customs and Border Protection (CBP) facility at the crossing served as the site for the Tornillo tent city, which housed as many as 2,800 detained migrant youths by January 2019.

In July 2019, U.S. Customs and Border Protection began construction on a new holding facility designed to hold 2,500 adult immigrants on the site. CBP expects the facility, which will be a "large, soft-sided structure" to begin operations in July or August 2019. On July 17, the deployment of 1,000 Texas National Guard troops to the Tornillo and Donna detention facilities was announced.

== See also ==
- List of international bridges in North America
