= Fabens–Caseta International Bridge =

Fabens–Caseta International Bridge Puente La Caseta
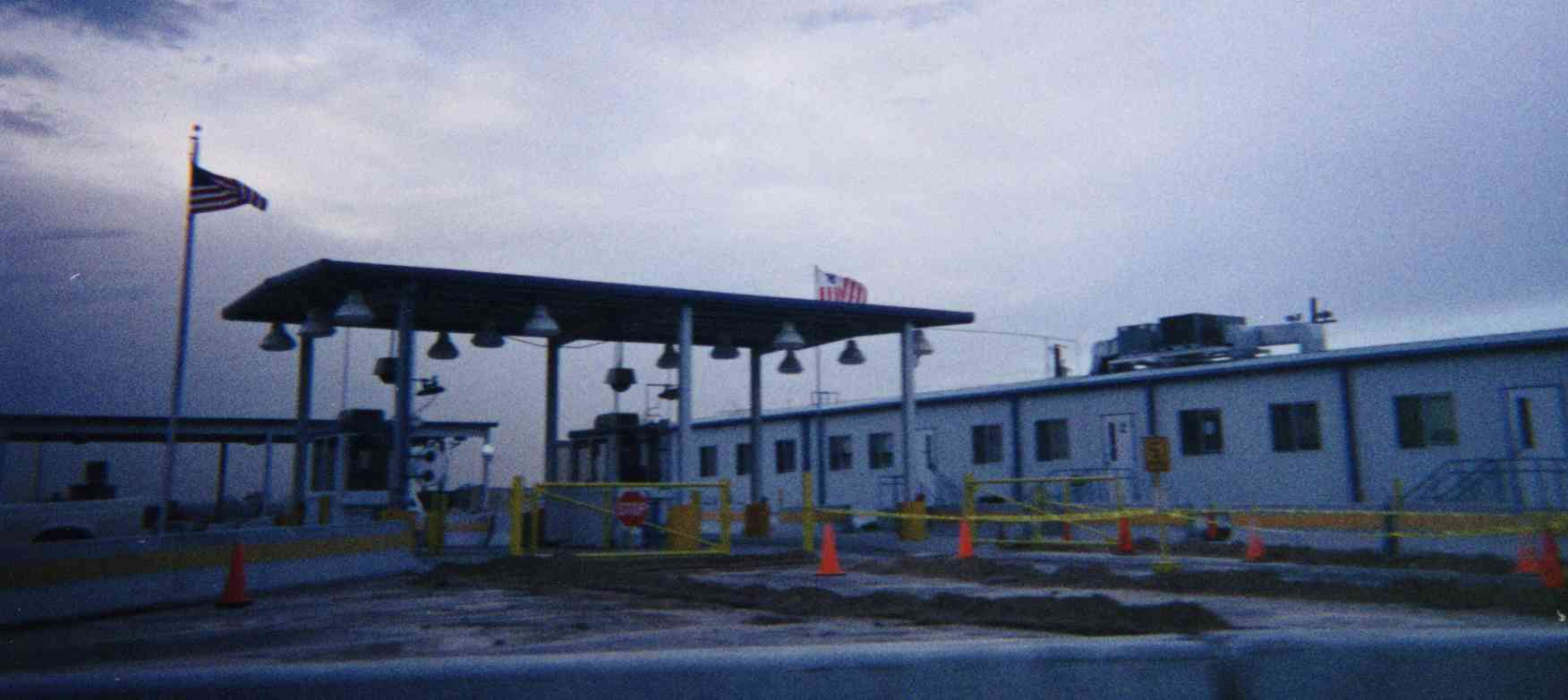
- Fabens, Texas Port of Entry, 1998
- Coordinates: 31°25′48.70″N 106°8′33.93″W
- Crosses: Rio Grande
- Locale: 18051 Island Guadalupe, Fabens, Texas 79838
- Website: web.archive.org/web/20121030083448/http://www.cbp.gov/xp/cgov/toolbox/contacts/ports/tx/2404.xml

Characteristics
- Width: 2 lanes

History
- Opened: 1938
- Closed: 2016

Location
- Interactive map of Fabens–Caseta International Bridge

The Fabens–Caseta International Bridge was an international bridge which crossed the Rio Grande connecting the United States–Mexico border towns of Fabens, Texas, US, and Tornillo, Chihuahua, Mexico. It was demolished in 2016 and replace by the Tornillo–Guadalupe International Bridge, located a short distance away.

== History ==
The two-lane bridge was constructed in 1938. The bridge was demolished in 2016 following the completion of the Tornillo-Guadalupe Bridge, which was erected a short distance away.

== Border crossing ==
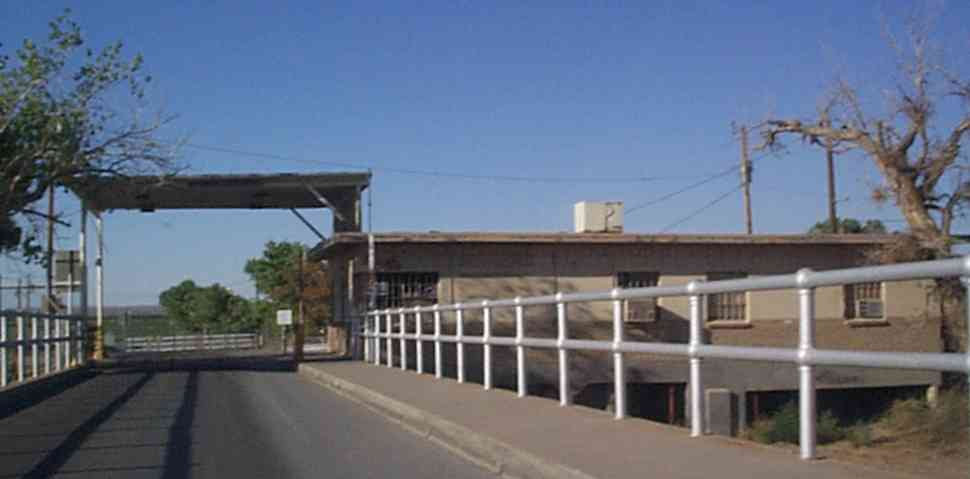
Fabens, Texas old border inspection station, as seen in 2001

The Fabens Port of Entry was a port of entry at the Mexico–United States border, in the town of Fabens, Texas. The port was established by Executive Order 4869 on May 1, 1928, ten years prior to the construction of the first bridge, so it is likely there was once a ferry operation at this location. The original port facility, built in 1938, was used as recently as the mid-1990s, when U.S. Customs and Border Protection (CBP) moved its operations to temporary buildings a short distance north of the bridge.

It closed on November 17, 2014, and traffic was diverted to the nearby Tornillo Port of Entry.

== See also ==
- List of bridges documented by the Historic American Engineering Record in Texas
- List of international bridges in North America
