= New Mexico State Road 136 =

State highway in New Mexico, United States

State Road 136
- Pete V. Domenici International Highway
- NM-136 highlighted in red

Route information
- Maintained by NMDOT
- Length: 9.157 mi (14.737 km)
- Existed: 1991–present

Major junctions
- South end: Fed. 2 spur at the Mexican border near Santa Teresa
- North end: SH 178 at the TX state line in Santa Teresa

Location
- Country: United States
- State: New Mexico
- Counties: Doña Ana

Highway system
- New Mexico State Highway System; Interstate; US; State; Scenic
← NM 134	→ NM 137

State Road 136 (NM 136) is a 9.157-mile-long (14.737 km), paved, four-lane, divided state highway in Doña Ana County in the U.S. state of New Mexico. It travels largely south-to-north. NM 136 is an important connecting road between the border and Interstate 10 (I-10).

The southern terminus of NM 136 is at the Santa Teresa Port of Entry on the Mexican border. The northern terminus is in Santa Teresa at the Texas state line. The road continues as State Highway 178 (SH 178) in Texas.

== Route description ==
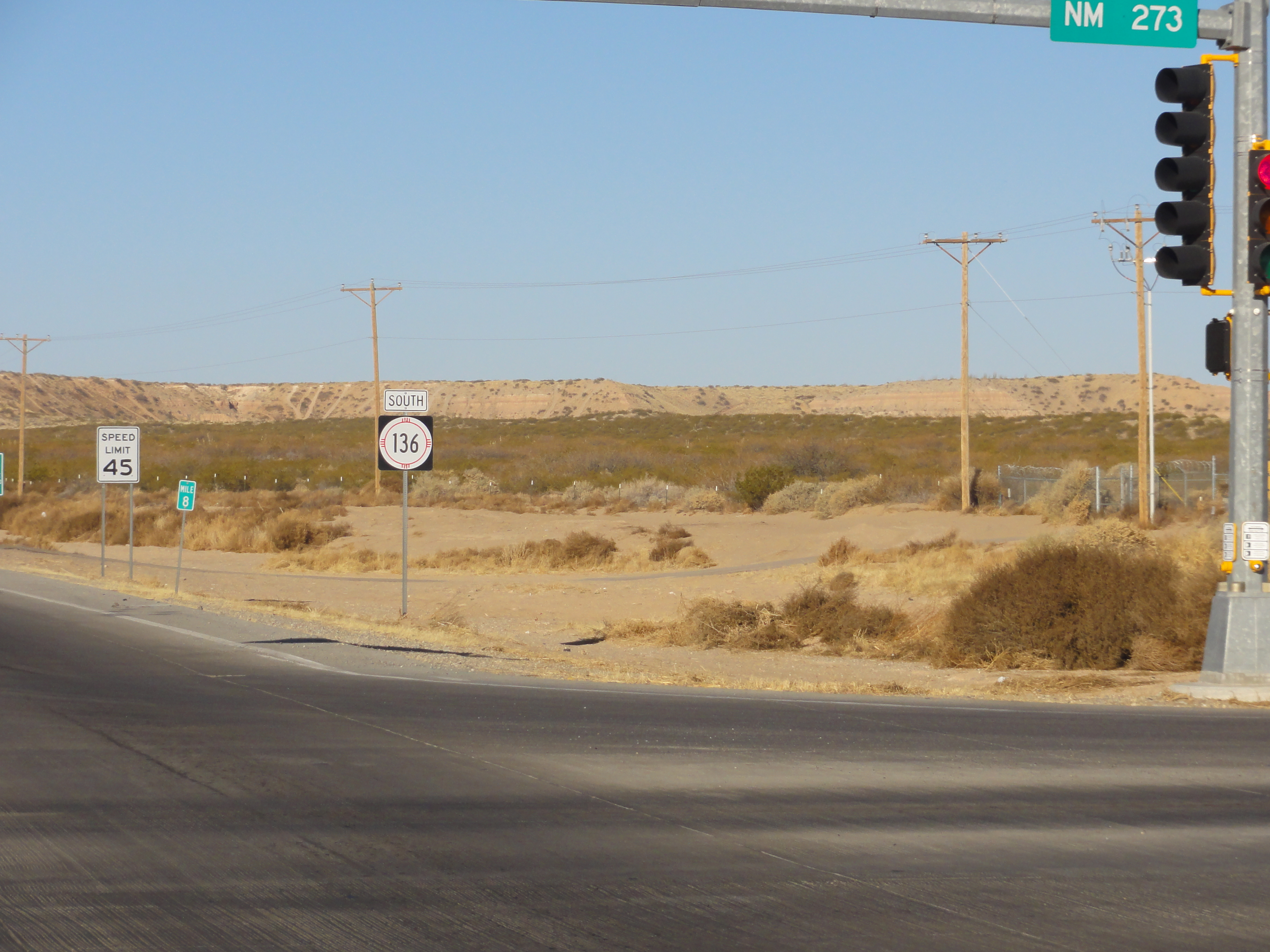
NM 136 southbound at its junction with NM 273

The highway begins at the Santa Teresa Port of Entry on the Mexican border. The road heads north through the Chihuahuan Desert and after about three miles (4.8 km) intersects with Doña Ana County Road A003, connecting to NM 9. Continuing north, NM 136 crosses the railroad tracks of the Union Pacific Railway south of intersection with Airport Road which provides access to the Doña Ana County Airport, Union Pacific Santa Teresa Facility, and War Eagles Museum. After passing by the airport, the highway turns east and enters Santa Teresa where it intersects with NM 273. Continuing east the road reaches its northern terminus at the Texas state line.

== History ==
The original Route 136 was established in mid-1930s as a replacement for Route 106 connecting New Mexico and Colorado, northwest of Chama. This road became U.S. Route 84 (US 84) in the early 1940s.

NM 136 was approved and built by the New Mexico State Highway Commission concurrently with SH 178 and Santa Teresa Port of Entry in 1988-1990, and officially opened in 1991. Santa Teresa Port of Entry was opened in 1992 and was designed to alleviate cross-border traffic through other border crossings in central El Paso. Both NM 136 and SH 178 were built to accommodate heavy tractor-trailers and provide ready access to I-10 northwest of El Paso.

Leroy Sandoval, former Transportation Planning Division Director, appeared before the New Mexico State Highway Commission and requested the Commission designate NM 136 as the Pete V. Domenici International Highway in honor of New Mexico senator Pete Domenici. The State Highway Commission concurred and approved the designation of NM 136 as the Pete V. Domenici International Highway on May 14, 1998, and appropriated $16,000 to erect signs for the new road name.

== Major intersections ==
The entire route is in Doña Ana County.

Location	mi	km	Destinations	Notes
	0.000	0.000	Fed. 2 spur – San Jerónimo, Chihuahua	Southern terminus
Santa Teresa	8.034	12.929	NM 273 – La Union, Sunland Park	
Santa Teresa	9.157	14.737	SH 178 – El Paso	Northern terminus
1.000 mi = 1.609 km; 1.000 km = 0.621 mi

== See also ==
- List of state roads in New Mexico
