= Fort Hancock–El Porvenir International Bridge =

Fort Hancock–El Porvenir International Bridge Puente El Porvenir
- Coordinates: 31°16′23″N 105°51′16″W
- Crosses: Rio Grande
- Locale: Fort Hancock, Texas

Characteristics
- Total length: 1,855 feet

History
- Opened: 1936

Location
- Interactive map of Fort Hancock–El Porvenir International Bridge

The Fort Hancock–El Porvenir International Bridge (Spanish: Puente El Porvenir) is an international bridge which crosses the Rio Grande connecting the United States–Mexico border cities of Fort Hancock, Texas, US, and El Porvenir, Chihuahua, Mexico.

== Location and history ==
Fort Hancock–El Porvenir International Bridge (Spanish: Puente El Porvenir) is located in the United States-Mexico border cities of Fort Hancock, Texas, US, and El Porvenir, Chihuahua, Mexico. This two-lane international bridge was constructed by the International Boundary and Water Commission (IBWC) in 1936. The bridge's road connects to Farm Market 1088 in the US and to Federal Highway 2 in Mexico.

On the US side the bridge includes the Fort Hancock Port of Entry, which serves as an immigration crossing managed by the US Customs and Border Protection (CBP). The port of entry station was constructed in 1955. The U.S. General Services Administration received funds to design a new border station in 2000. The station was made in 2003.

The bridge is 510 ft (160 m) long. Commercial vehicles are not permitted to enter the U.S. at this location. In 2010, it reported 800 to 1,000 daily passenger vehicles.

== See also ==
- List of crossings of the Rio Grande
- List of international bridges in North America
