= Santa Teresa Port of Entry =

US-Mexico border crossing

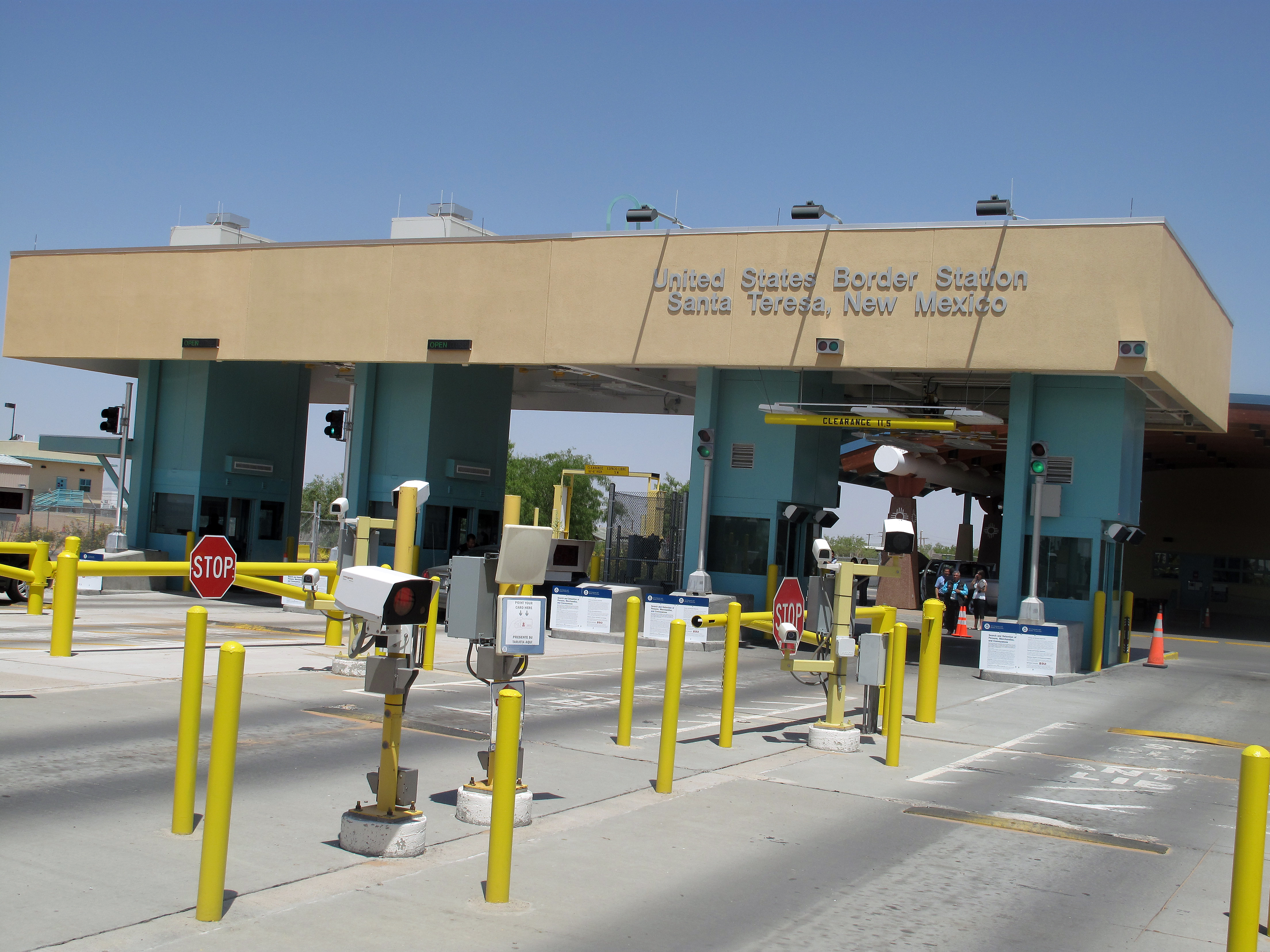
- US Border Inspection Station at Santa Teresa

Location
- Country: United States
- Location: NM 136; 170 Pete Domenici Hwy, Santa Teresa, New Mexico, 88008
- Coordinates: 31.785877°N 106.680315°W

Details
- Opened: January 12, 1993

Statistics
- 2011 Cars: 408,614
- 2011 Trucks: 71,362
- Pedestrians: 120,813

Website
- https://www.cbp.gov/contact/ports/santa-teresa-new-mexico-2408

The Santa Teresa Port of Entry is a border crossing between Santa Teresa, New Mexico, and San Jerónimo, Chihuahua. It was built in 1992 to relieve pressure from the busy El Paso BOTA Port of Entry, a short distance to the east, and started operating on January 12, 1993. The General Services Administration is currently increasing the capacity of the port of entry, taking advantage of the available land. The crossing is open daily from 6 am until midnight. The station has three commercial vehicle lanes and four passenger lanes. The entry port is located forty-two miles south of Las Cruces, New Mexico, and around twenty minutes from downtown El Paso, Texas. It was used as a filming location in the Better Call Saul episode "Fifi."

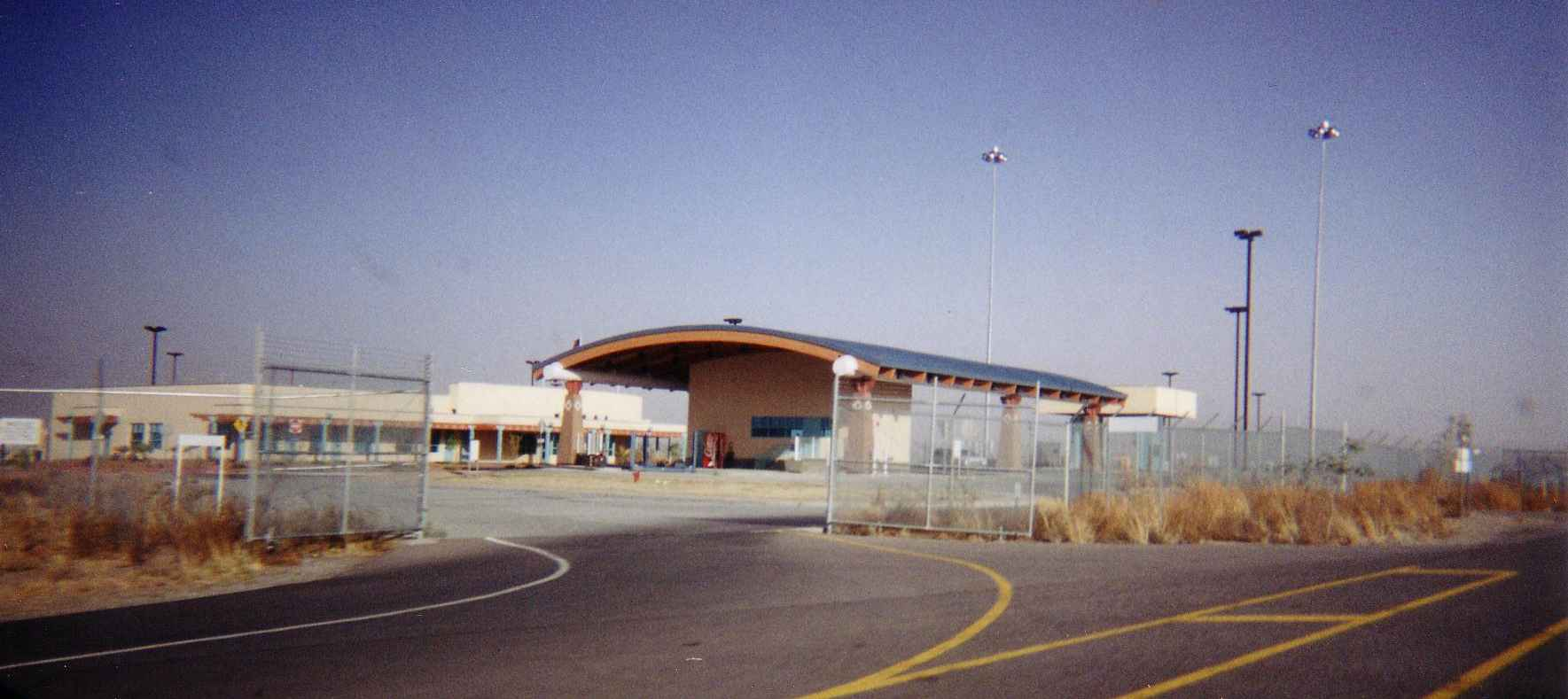
Santa Teresa Border Station as seen in 2004

== See also ==
- List of Mexico–United States border crossings
