= Stanton Street Bridge =

Bridge across the US-Mexico border

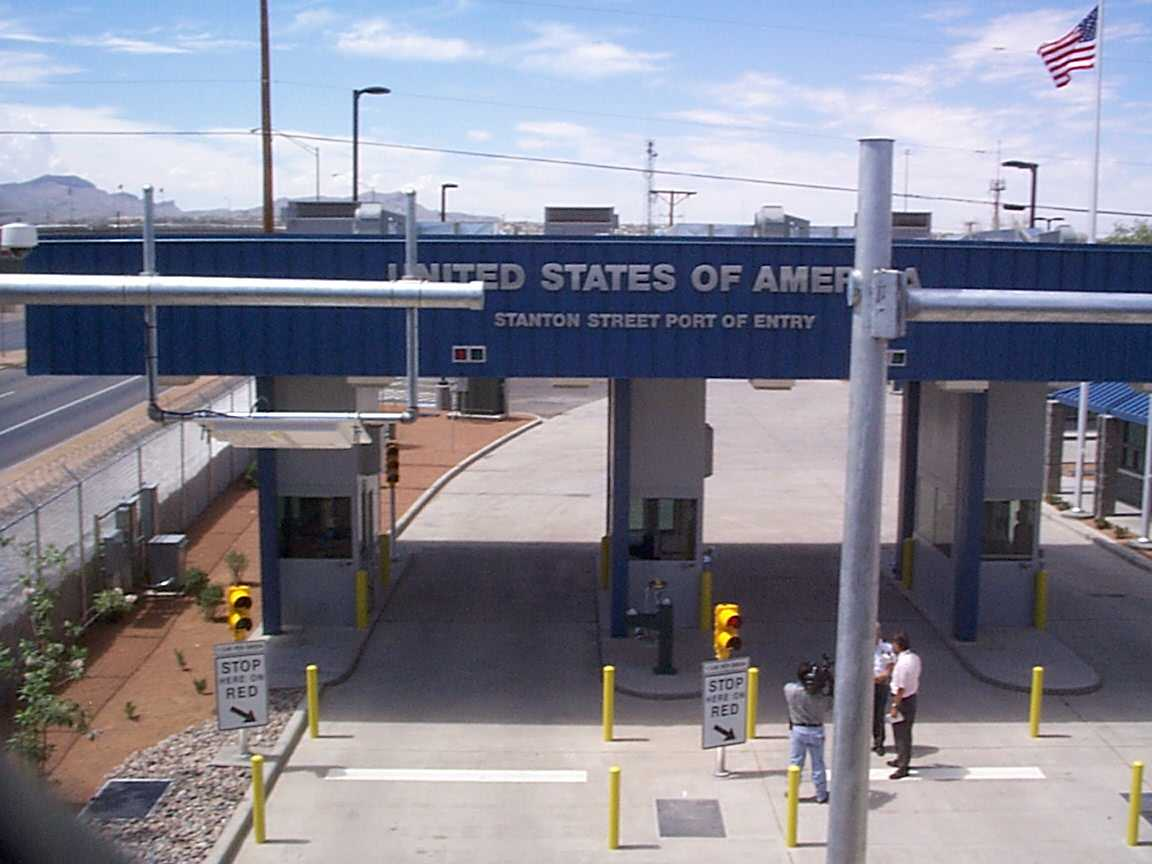
- El Paso Stanton Street Port of Entry just prior to its opening in 1999
- Coordinates: 31°44′53″N 106°28′58″W
- Crosses: Rio Grande
- Locale: 1090 Mesa Street, El Paso, Texas 79901
- Official name: Good Neighbor International Bridge
- Other name: Friendship Bridge

Characteristics
- Total length: 880 feet (270 m)

History
- Construction end: 1967

Location
- Interactive map of Stanton Street Bridge

The Good Neighbor International Bridge, commonly known as the Stanton Street Bridge, is an international bridge connecting the United States–Mexico border cities of El Paso, Texas, US, and Ciudad Juárez, Chihuahua, Mexico, across the Rio Grande (Río Bravo).

The bridge is 880 feet (270 m) long.

== Description and names ==
The Good Neighbor International Bridge is known by multiple names. In Mexico, it is referred to as Puente Internacional Lerdo (Centro) ("Lerdo International Bridge, Center"). The bridge is also known as Puente de la Amistad ("Friendship Bridge"), Puente Río Bravo ("Rio Bravo Bridge"), and Puente Ciudad Juárez–Stanton El Paso ("Ciudad Juárez–Stanton El Paso Bridge").

== History ==
A bridge has existed at this location since approximately 1896, and US Customs services began soon afterward. The bridge was rebuilt several times, periodically damaged by floods. Since its reconstruction in 1967 as part of the Chamizal Treaty between the US and Mexico, the bridge was dedicated to southbound traffic. In 1998, the U.S. Immigration and Naturalization Service and U.S. Customs Service chose this bridge as the best location to set up a dedicated commuter lane to relieve cross-border congestion in the busy El Paso-Ciudad Juarez metroplex. The General Services Administration constructed a port of entry on available land just west of the bridge and it was opened to pre-enrolled northbound traffic in September 1999.

Until August 24, 2022, a designated commuter lane on the bridge was co-leased and operated by the United States General Services Administration and the El Paso Chamber.

== Border crossing ==
The bridge has 5 lanes with 3 lanes for south bound traffic. One of those lanes is a Secure Electronic Network for Travelers Rapid Inspection (SENTRI) northbound traffic lane.

The border crossing is open from 6:00 AM - midnight weekdays, and 8:00 AM - midnight Saturdays and Sundays.

The U.S. side of the bridge is owned by the City of El Paso.

== See also ==
- List of international bridges in North America
