= Paso del Norte International Bridge =

Paso del Norte International Bridge Puente Benito Juárez
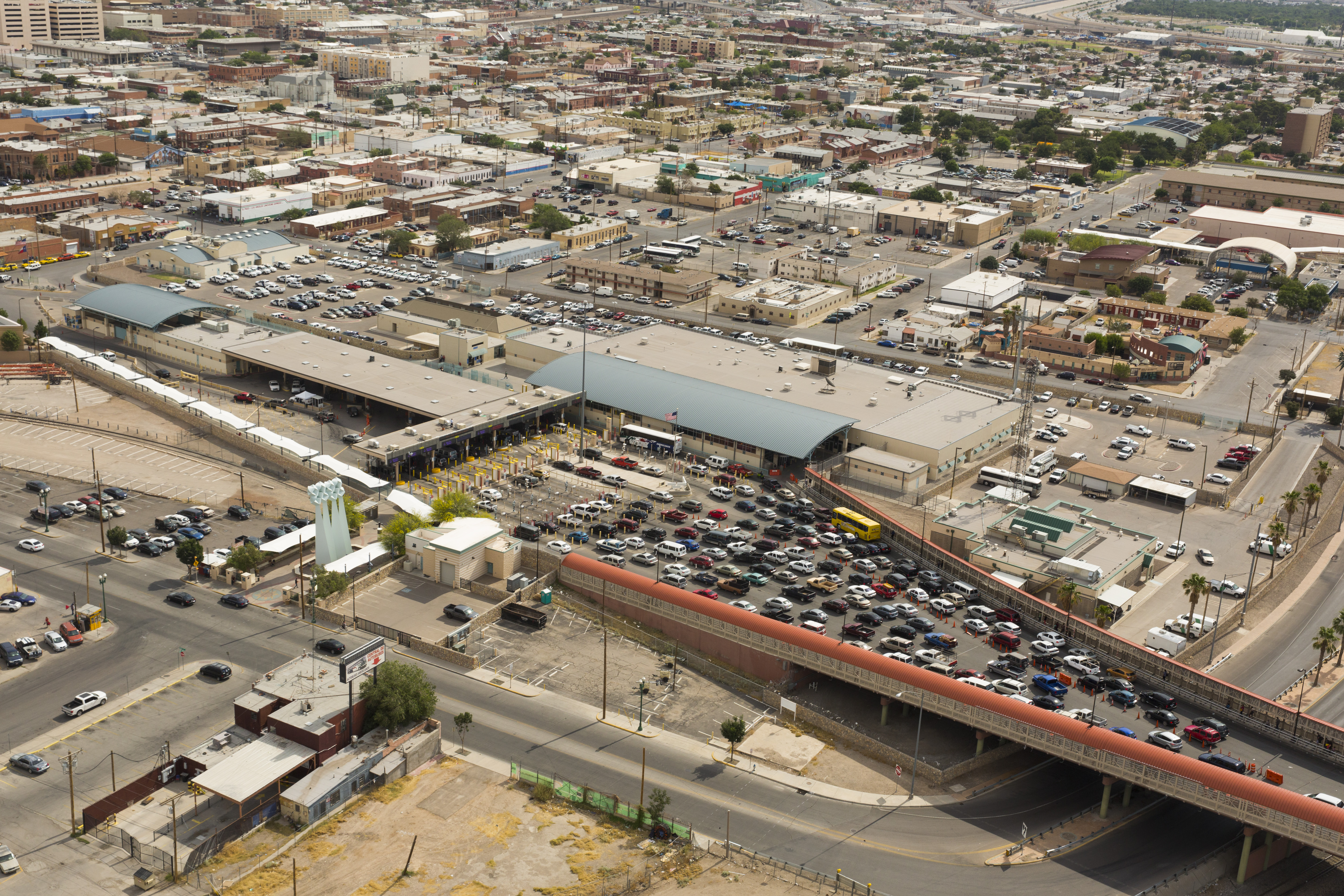
- Paso Del Norte POE El Paso Texas
- Coordinates: 31°44′52″N 106°29′13″W
- Crosses: Rio Grande
- Locale: 1000 South El Paso Street, El Paso, Texas 79901
- Official name: Paso del Norte Bridge
- Other name: Santa Fe Street Bridge
- Owner: City of El Paso
- Website: www.cbp.gov/xp/cgov/toolbox/contacts/ports/tx/2402.xml

Characteristics
- No. of lanes: 4

History
- Opened: 1967

Location
- Interactive map of Paso del Norte International Bridge

The Paso del Norte International Bridge is an international bridge which crosses the Rio Grande (Río Bravo) river connecting the United States-Mexico border cities of El Paso, Texas, US, and Ciudad Juárez, Chihuahua, Mexico.

== Description and names ==
The bridge is also known as "Paso del Norte Bridge", "Santa Fe Street Bridge", "Puente Benito Juárez", "Puente Paso del Norte" and "Puente Juárez-Santa Fe". The PDN is sometimes called the Santa Fe bridge, because its predecessor (prior to 1967) emptied traffic onto Santa Fe Street immediately to the west.

== History ==
Bridges between El Paso and Ciudad Juárez have existed at this location for over 250 years, and they have been rebuilt many times due to floods, expansion, and international treaties. The bridge was constructed in 1967. It was renovated in 1991 and expanded again in 2009.

On March 26, 2019, dozens of illegal immigrants were captured by United States Customs and Border Protection agents, who had insufficient space for them in local holding facilities. So they erected chainlink fencing and concertina wire under the bridge to construct a "transitional shelter" to detain them. As of March 30, hundreds of immigrants were sleeping on dirt and rocks, with mylar blankets, portable toilets and plastic portable sinks.

By mid-June, conditions had worsened, with between 100 and 150 detainees reporting most have been held for over a month, without being allowed to bathe or change clothing, in temperatures exceeding 100 °F (38 °C).

== Border crossing ==
The Paso del Norte International Bridge is a four-lane bridge for northbound non-commercial traffic only, although pedestrians may also cross the bridge in the southbound direction. It is among the busiest border crossings between the two countries: more than 10 million people enter the U.S. from Mexico each year at this location. The PDN Port of Entry ranks second only to the San Ysidro Port of Entry in the number of pedestrians entering the U.S. from Mexico each year.

Approximately 2,000 trains enter the U.S. each year on an adjacent rail bridge. Streetcar traffic also once entered the U.S. on the Paso del Norte Bridge, but that service ended in 1974.

The American side of the bridge is owned and operated by the City of El Paso.

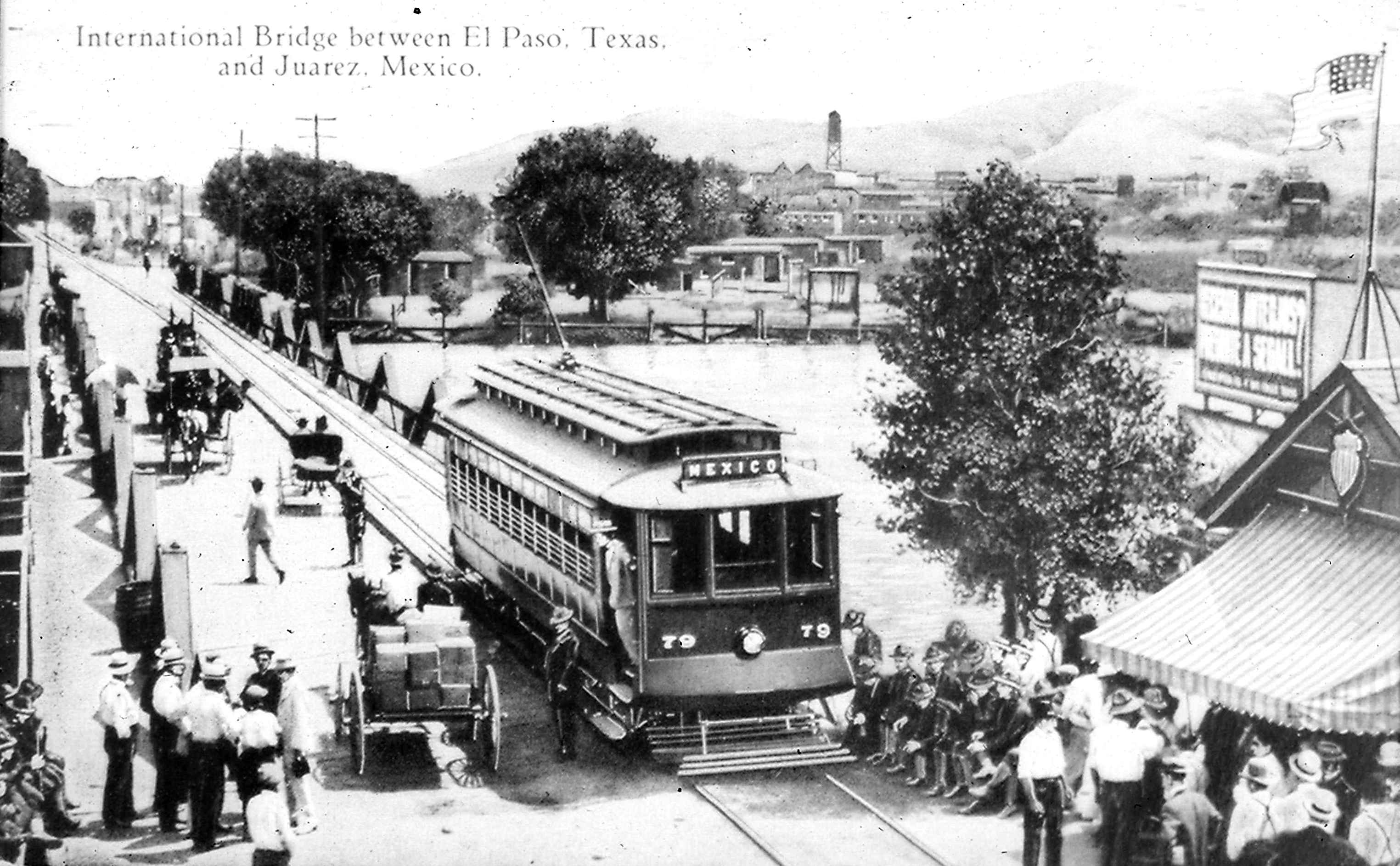
El Paso Border Inspection Station, 1902

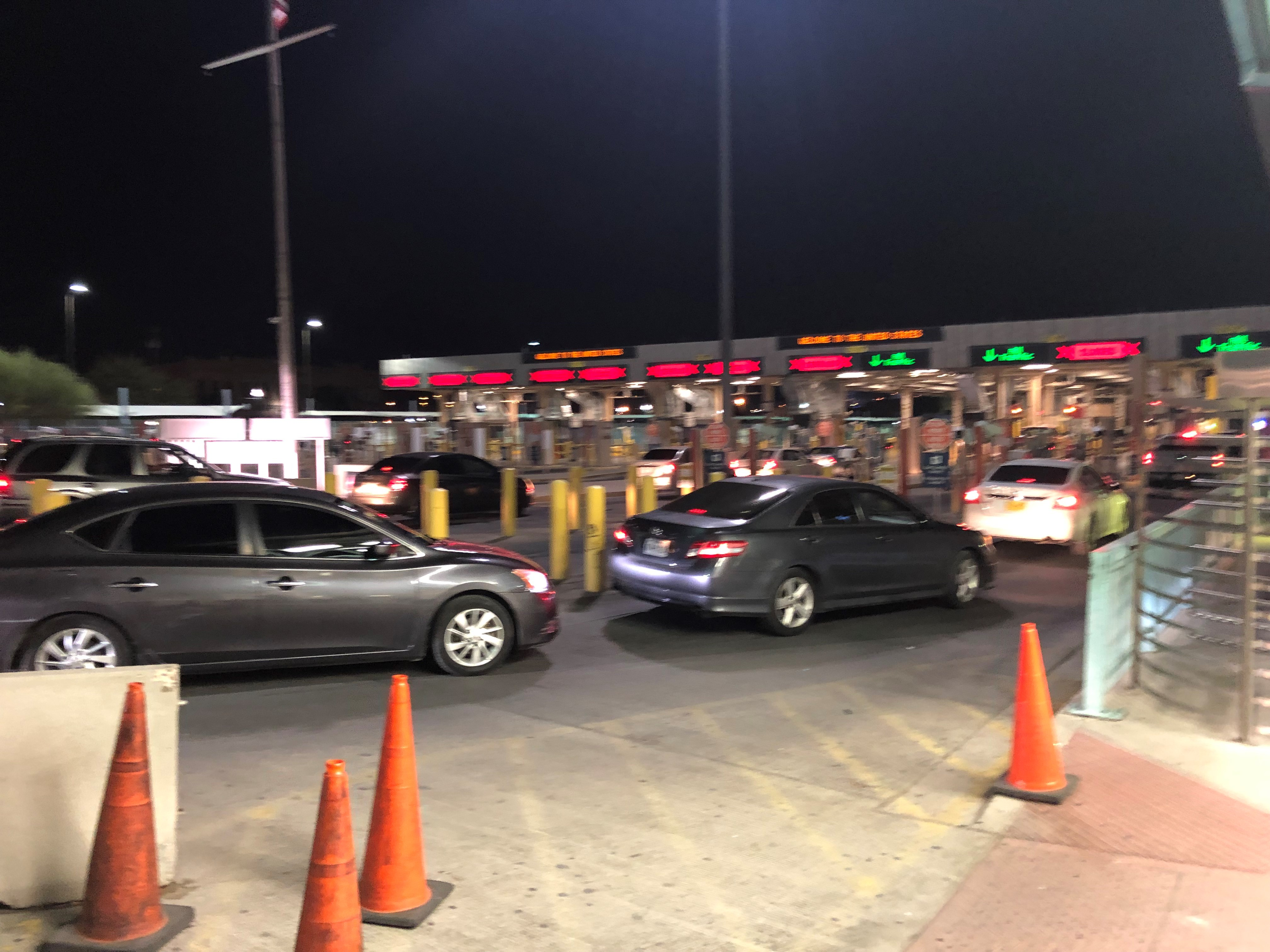
El Paso PDN Port of Entry as seen from the Mexico side, 2019

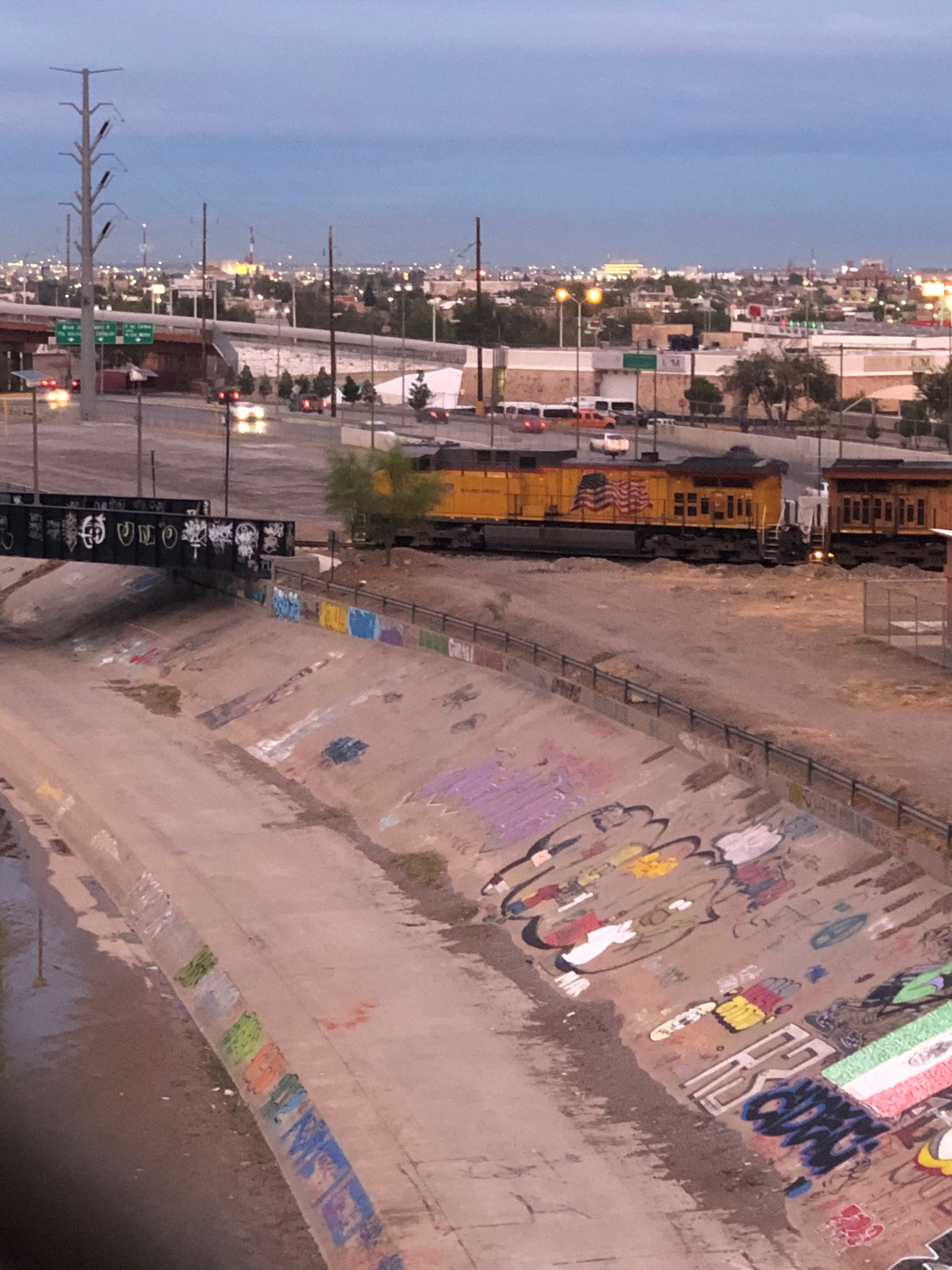
Train waiting in Ciudad Juárez just before the Rio Grande waiting to be cleared to enter by CBP into the U.S., 2019

== See also ==
- List of international bridges in North America
