= Santa Teresa, New Mexico =

Census-designated place in Doña Ana County, New Mexico, United States

- Unincorporated community Census-designated place
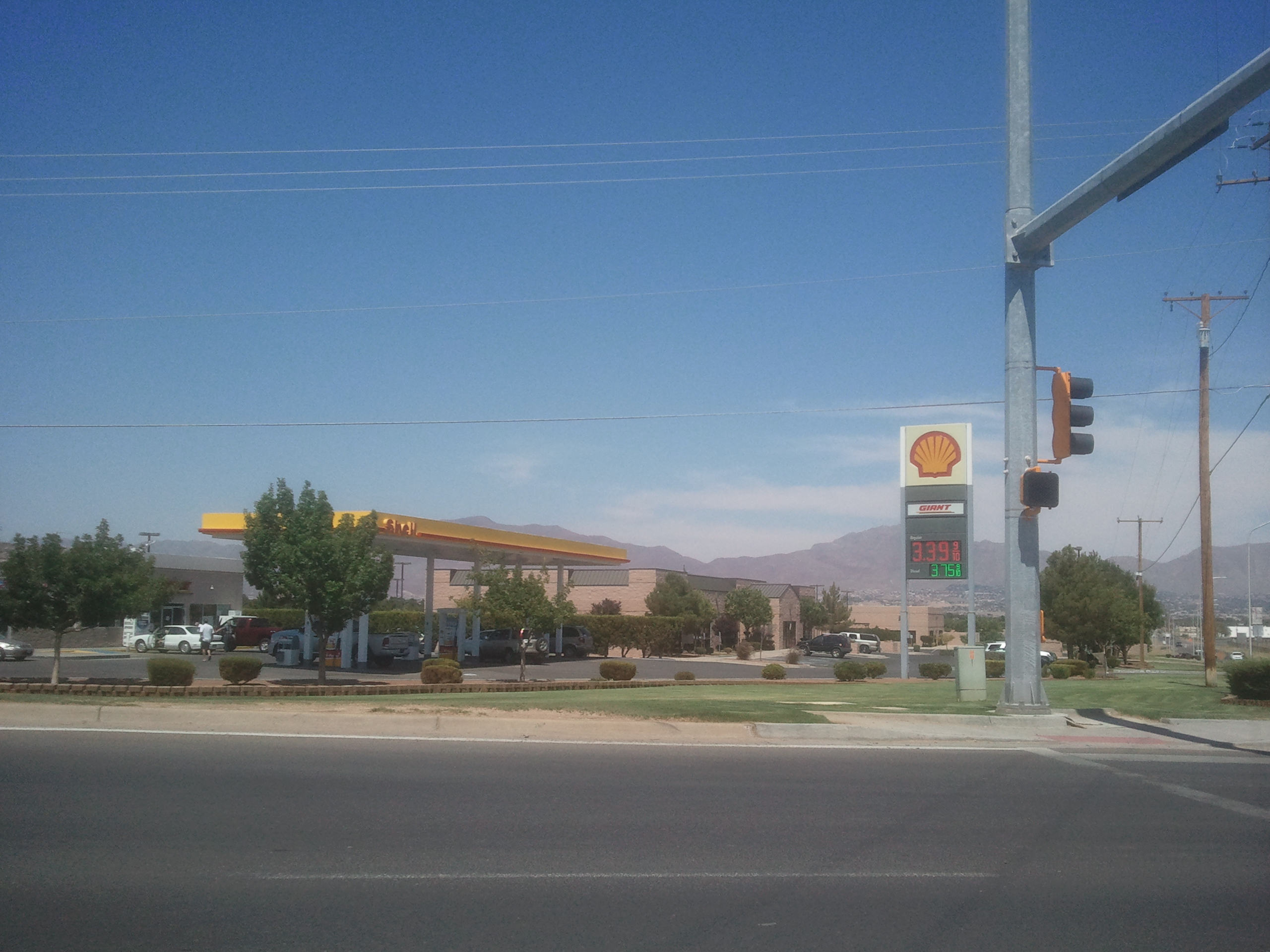
- Main Street in Santa Teresa, June 2013

- Location within Dona Ana County and New Mexico

- Location in the United States Location in New Mexico
- Coordinates: 31°52′16″N 106°40′24″W
- Country: United States
- State: New Mexico
- County: Dona Ana

Area
  - Total: 8.85 sq mi (22.92 km^{2})
  - Land: 8.85 sq mi (22.92 km^{2})
  - Water: 0 sq mi (0.00 km^{2})
- Elevation: 3,937 ft (1,200 m)

Population (2020)
  - Total: 5,044
  - Density: 569.9/sq mi (220.05/km^{2})
- Time zone: UTC-7 (Mountain (MST))
  - Summer (DST): UTC-6 (MDT)
- ZIP codes: 88008, 88063
- Area code: 575
- FIPS code: 35-70700
- GNIS feature ID: 2409282

Santa Teresa is an unincorporated community in Dona Ana County, New Mexico, United States. It is home to the Santa Teresa Port of Entry and is part of the Las Cruces Metropolitan Statistical Area, although geographically it is considerably closer to El Paso, Texas, than to Las Cruces. While the United States Census Bureau defined Santa Teresa as a census-designated place (CDP), the census definition of the area may not precisely correspond to local understanding of the area with the same name. The population was 4,258 at the 2010 census and 5,044 at the 2020 census. The National Weather Service El Paso Weather Forecast Office that serves extreme western Texas and Southwestern New Mexico states is based in Santa Teresa.

== History ==
In 2015, the community of Santa Teresa petitioned the Doña Ana County Board of Commissioners to incorporate it as a city. When Sunland Park proposed annexing Santa Teresa, every Board member agreed that Sunland Park had no jurisdiction over Santa Teresa, whereupon Sunland Park filed an appeal to that decision with the New Mexico Supreme Court.

== Geography ==
According to the United States Census Bureau, the CDP has a total area of 10.9 square miles (28 km^{2}), all land.

== Demographics ==
Historical population
Census	Pop.	Note	%±
2020	5,044		—
U.S. Decennial Census

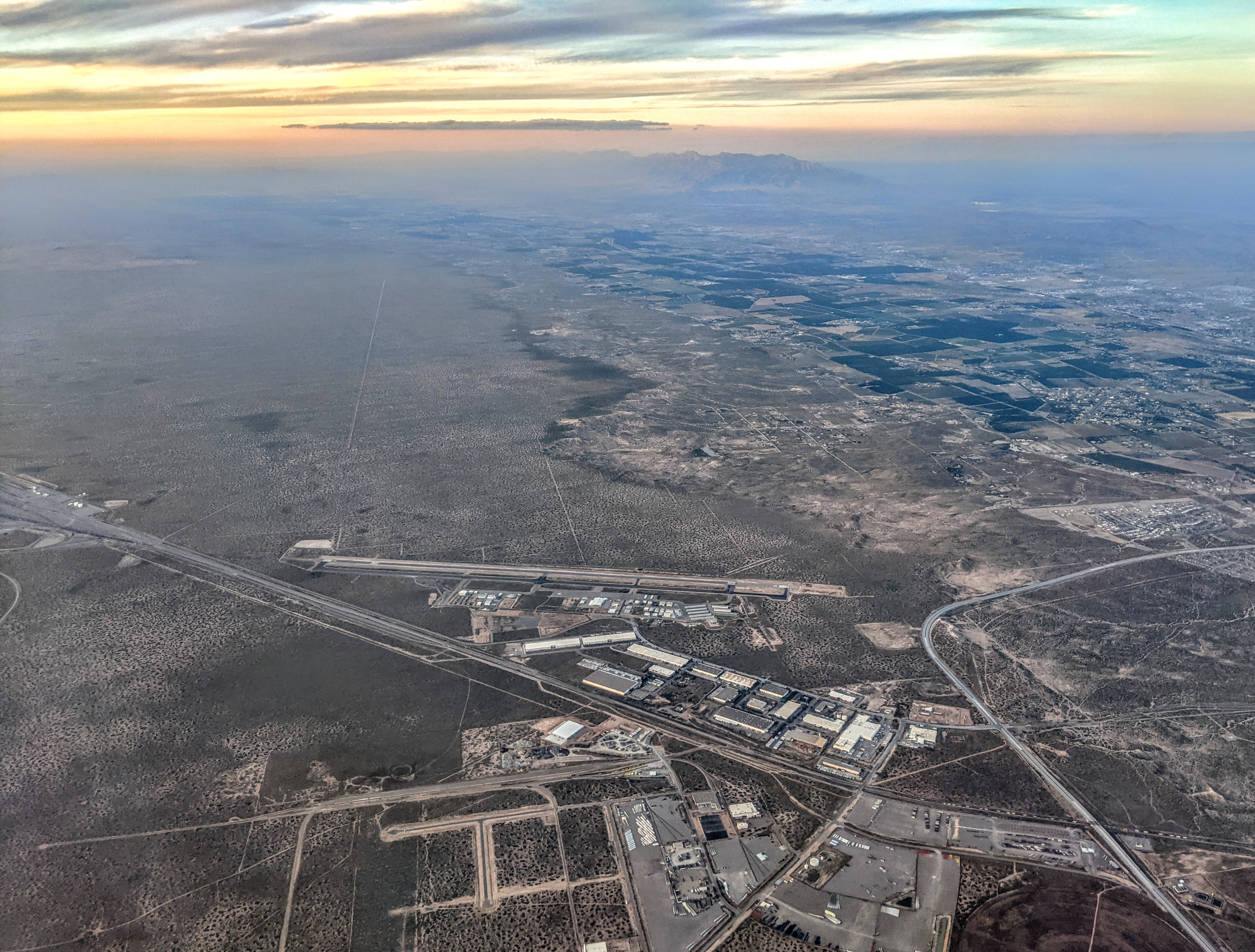
Aerial view of northwest Santa Teresa with the Doña Ana County International Jetport

=== 2020 census ===
As of the 2020 census, Santa Teresa had a population of 5,044. The median age was 35.9 years. 26.0% of residents were under the age of 18 and 15.1% of residents were 65 years of age or older. For every 100 females there were 89.6 males, and for every 100 females age 18 and over there were 85.8 males age 18 and over.

91.1% of residents lived in urban areas, while 8.9% lived in rural areas.

There were 1,780 households in Santa Teresa, of which 38.9% had children under the age of 18 living in them. Of all households, 49.6% were married-couple households, 14.8% were households with a male householder and no spouse or partner present, and 29.0% were households with a female householder and no spouse or partner present. About 21.1% of all households were made up of individuals and 8.7% had someone living alone who was 65 years of age or older.

There were 1,866 housing units, of which 4.6% were vacant. The homeowner vacancy rate was 2.2% and the rental vacancy rate was 5.4%.

Racial composition as of the 2020 census
Race	Number	Percent
White	1,880	37.3%
Black or African American	56	1.1%
American Indian and Alaska Native	76	1.5%
Asian	27	0.5%
Native Hawaiian and Other Pacific Islander	5	0.1%
Some other race	1,036	20.5%
Two or more races	1,964	38.9%
Hispanic or Latino (of any race)	4,097	81.2%

=== 2000 census ===
As of the census of 2000, there were 2,607 people, 952 households, and 755 families residing in the CDP. The population density was 238.0 inhabitants per square mile (91.9/km^{2}). There were 1,007 housing units at an average density of 91.9 per square mile (35.5/km^{2}). The racial makeup of the CDP was 82.09% White, 1.19% African American, 0.65% Native American, 0.38% Asian, 0.23% Pacific Islander, 13.04% from other races, and 2.42% from two or more races. Hispanic or Latino of any race were 55.58% of the population.

There were 952 households, out of which 40.0% had children under the age of 18 living with them, 68.0% were married couples living together, 8.3% had a female householder with no husband present, and 20.6% were non-families. 17.4% of all households were made up of individuals, and 5.4% had someone living alone who was 65 years of age or older. The average household size was 2.74 and the average family size was 3.11.

In the CDP, the population was spread out, with 27.8% under the age of 18, 6.0% from 18 to 24, 31.8% from 25 to 44, 22.6% from 45 to 64, and 11.9% who were 65 years of age or older. The median age was 36 years. For every 100 females, there were 94.8 males. For every 100 females age 18 and over, there were 92.5 males.

The median income for a household in the CDP was $61,500, and the median income for a family was $66,833. Males had a median income of $43,500 versus $30,326 for females. The per capita income for the CDP was $24,561. About 2.2% of families and 1.6% of the population were below the poverty line, including 0.7% of those under age 18 and none of those age 65 or over.

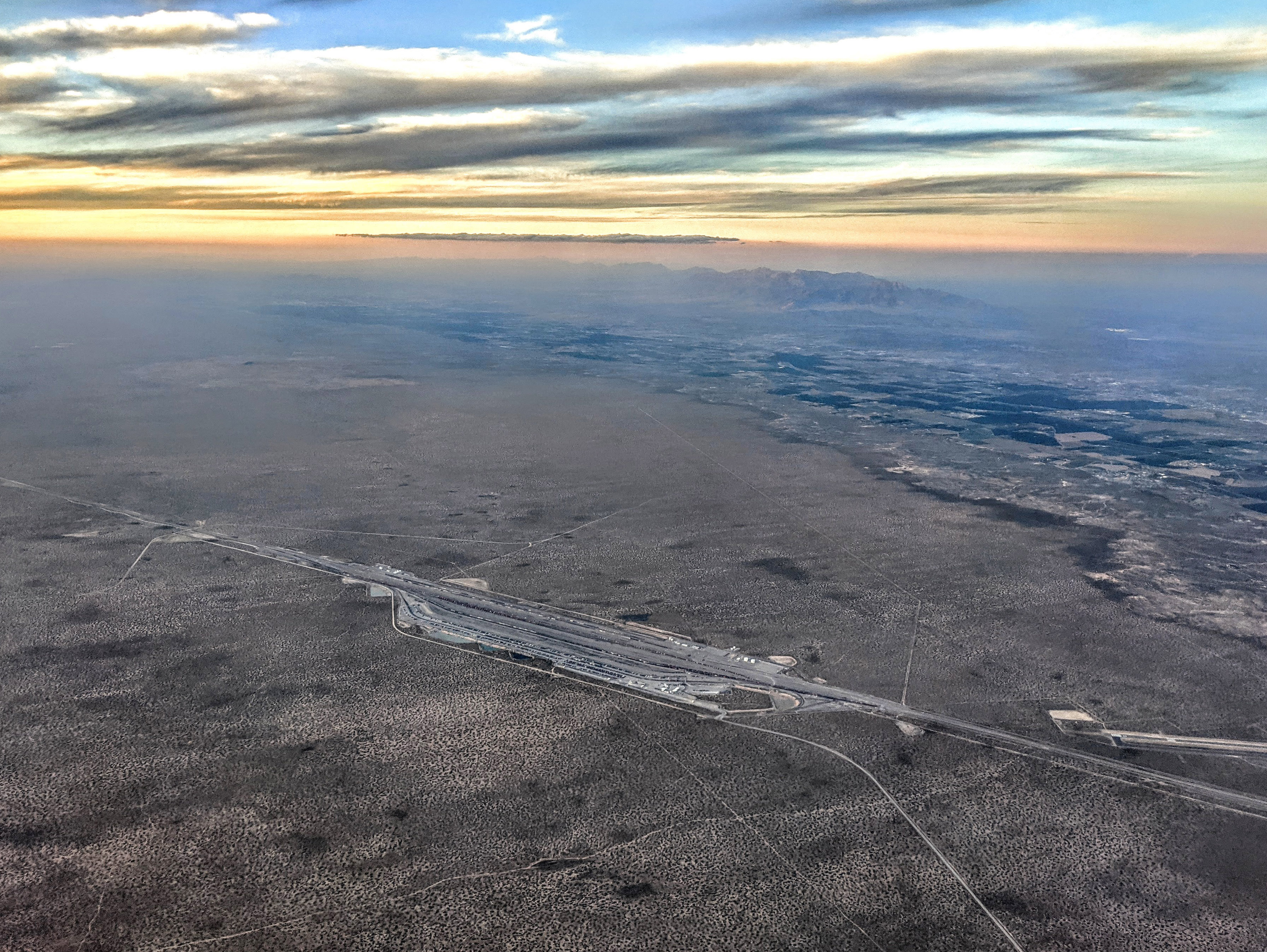
Aerial view of the Union Pacific Railroad Intermodal Terminal, just outside Santa Teresa to the northwest

== Education ==
The Gadsden Independent School District operates public schools, including

- Santa Teresa High School
- Santa Teresa Middle School
- Santa Teresa Elementary School

== Infrastructure ==
Water is supplied by the Camino Real Regional Utility Authority.

The community is served by the Doña Ana County International Jetport.

The town’s 1,100-acre Santa Teresa Gateway Rail Park is rail-served by the Santa Teresa Southern Railroad, which interchanges with the Union Pacific Railroad.

== See also ==
- List of census-designated places in New Mexico
