= California State Route 11 =

State highway in San Diego County, California, United States

State Route 11
- SR 11 highlighted in red

Route information
- Maintained by Caltrans
- Length: 1.7 mi (2.7 km)
- Existed: 1994–present

Major junctions
- West end: SR 125 Toll / SR 905 in Otay Mesa
- East end: Siempre Viva Road in Otay Mesa

Location
- Country: United States
- State: California
- Counties: San Diego

Highway system
- State highways in California; Interstate; US; State; Scenic; History; Pre‑1964; Unconstructed; Deleted; Freeways
← I-10	→ SR 12

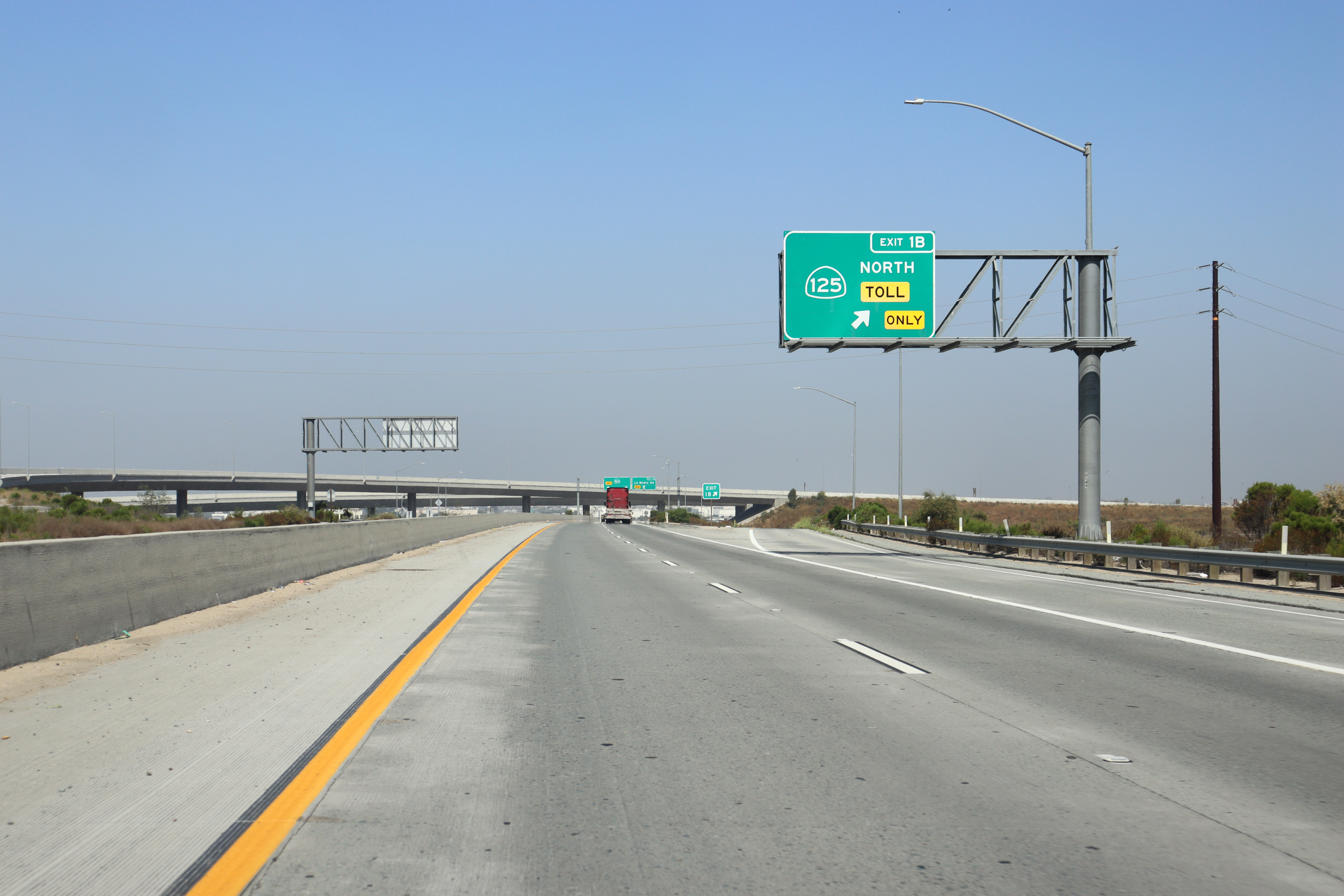
Westbound California State Route 11 at the interchange with California State Route 125.

State Route 11 (SR 11) is a state highway in the U.S. state of California. The first phase of the highway opened in 2016, connecting SR 125 and SR 905 with Enrico Fermi Drive in the Otay Mesa area of San Diego. SR 11 was then extended further east to Siempre Viva Road in Otay Mesa in 2025, with future plans to connect the highway to the proposed U.S.–Mexico border crossing at Otay Mesa East. SR 11 is then planned to be converted to a toll road once the entire route is completed. Planning for the road began in the 1990s, and construction started in 2013.

== Route description ==
Route 11 is defined in section 311 of the California Streets and Highways Code, and that the highway is "from the northerly border of the new Federal Port of Entry and east of the Otay Mesa Port of Entry to near the junction of Route 125 and Route 905".

SR 11 is proposed to be a toll facility that will serve a new border crossing east of Otay Mesa, the Otay Mesa East Port of Entry. It will connect SR 125 and SR 905 to the Corredor Tijuana-Rosarito 2000 corridor that connects to Mexican Federal Highway 2D and Mexican Federal Highway 2 to Tecate, and Mexican Federal Highway 1D to Ensenada.

By 2025, SR 11 from SR 125 and SR 905 to Siempre Viva Road had been constructed, with the segment connecting the highway to the new border crossing still left to be completed. SR 11 will operate as a toll road once the entire route is completed.

== History ==
The former version of SR 11 was designated in 1934, running through the present-day Route 110 corridor in Los Angeles.

SR 11 was re-added to the state highway system in 1994. Four years later, several parties, including District 11 of the California Department of Transportation (Caltrans), the City and County of San Diego, the San Diego Association of Governments, and Tijuana were signatories to a Letter of Intent to build the border crossing. The route was added to the California Freeway and Expressway System in 1999. In 2009, Senate Bill 1486 was passed, and the presidential permit in 2008 allowed for the border crossing to be constructed. By the following year, several alternatives were considered to construct some or even none of the interchanges or remove the proposed toll on the route. State funding is allocated to cover much of the $400 million costs, not including the port of entry for another $350 million. The California Transportation Commission endorsed the project in January 2012, and approved the proposed freeway route that December.

Before being upgraded to a freeway between Britannia Boulevard and Siempre Viva Road, SR 905 directly connected with SR 125 via two at-grade intersections on Otay Mesa Road. When Caltrans opened that segment of the SR 905 freeway in 2010, they omitted the interchange with SR 125, forcing traffic on SR 905 and SR 125 to exit their respective freeways and use Otay Mesa Road (which SR 905 followed at that time) to make the connection. To help fix this problem, a direct freeway-to-freeway interchange was planned, which also included SR 11 once it was to be constructed, with construction beginning in late 2015. Ramps from SR 905 eastbound to SR 125 northbound, SR 905 westbound to SR 125 northbound, and SR 11 westbound to SR 125 northbound were completed on November 30, 2016, at the cost of over $21 million. Prior to December 16, 2021, traffic on southbound SR 125 was forced to exit onto Otay Mesa Road at that toll road's then southern terminus in order to connect to SR 11 and SR 905. Construction on the ramps for these connections began in 2018, with the ramps from SR 125 southbound to SR 11 eastbound and SR 125 southbound to SR 905 eastbound being completed on December 16, 2021, at the cost of $74 million. The ramp from SR 125 southbound to SR 905 westbound, which was still under construction at the time, was initially scheduled to open to traffic in 2023, but was instead opened to traffic on July 26, 2022, finally completing the interchange.

== Future ==
Plans are to construct the road in three stages: the interchange with SR 125 and SR 905 and the road to Enrico Fermi Drive, continuing the construction to the commercial vehicle facility, and building the border crossing itself. The first part of construction—connecting to SR 905—started on December 10, 2013, and was completed on March 19, 2016. This first segment to Enrico Fermi Drive was completed in 2017.

The second phase, connecting to the future Otay Mesa East Port of Entry, began construction in August 2019 and was scheduled to be completed in late 2021. However, the segment between Enrico Fermi Drive and Siempre Viva Road did not open until 2025. Construction of the port of entry was initially scheduled to begin in 2022 and finish in 2024, but has also been delayed to at least 2026.

When the border crossing is completed, tolls are then planned for the road in order to keep delays for crossing the border low, and this would vary depending on the current traffic at the other crossings in the area. A binational toll revenue sharing agreement was signed in 2022, so toll funds would go to both countries.

== Exit list ==
The entire route is in San Diego, San Diego County.

mi	km	Exit	Destinations	Notes
0.00	0.00		SR 905 west	No access to SR 905 east; west end of SR 11; SR 905 exit 8; future I-905
0.32	0.51	1A	La Media Road	Westbound exit only
0.40– 0.58	0.64– 0.93	1A	SR 125 Toll north (South Bay Expressway)	Signed as exit 1B westbound; southern terminus of SR 125
1.40	2.25	1B	Enrico Fermi Drive	Diverging diamond interchange
		2	Siempre Viva Road	Current east end of SR 11
		Mexico–United States border (Otay Mesa East Port of Entry)		
1.000 mi = 1.609 km; 1.000 km = 0.621 mi: Incomplete access; Tolled; Unopened
