= California State Route 905 =

Highway in California

State Route 905
- Otay Mesa Freeway
- SR 905 highlighted in red

Route information
- Maintained by Caltrans
- Length: 8.964 mi (14.426 km)
- Existed: 1986 (from SR 117)–present

Major junctions
- West end: Oro Vista Road / Tocayo Avenue in San Diego
- I-5 in San Diego; I-805 in San Diego; SR 11 / SR 125 Toll in Otay Mesa
- East end: Boulevard Garita de Otay at the Mexican border near Otay Mesa

Location
- Country: United States
- State: California
- Counties: San Diego

Highway system
- State highways in California; Interstate; US; State; Scenic; History; Pre‑1964; Unconstructed; Deleted; Freeways
← I-880	→ I-980

State Route 905 (SR 905), also known as the Otay Mesa Freeway, is an 8.964-mile-long (14.426 km) state highway in San Diego, in the southwestern part of the U.S. state of California. It connects I-5 and I-805 in San Ysidro to the Mexican border at Otay Mesa. The entire highway from I-5 to the international border is a freeway with a few exits that continues east from the I-805 interchange before turning southeast and reaching the border.

SR 905 formerly followed Otay Mesa Road, which had been in existence since at least 1927. Before it was SR 905, the route was first designated as part of SR 75, before it was redesignated as SR 117. The freeway was completed between I-5 and Otay Mesa Road in 1976. The border crossing opened in 1985 after several delays in obtaining funding for construction on what would become SR 905. After becoming SR 905 in 1986, the highway was converted to first an expressway in 2000 and then a freeway in 2010 and 2011. This state route is planned to become Interstate 905 eventually.

== Route description ==
Route 905 is defined in section 632 of the California Streets and Highways Code:

Route 905 is from:
(a) The International Boundary near Border Field northeasterly to Route 5.
(b) Route 5 near the south end of San Diego Bay to the International Boundary southerly of Brown Field.

Neither a border crossing near Border Field nor a western extension of Route 905 has been constructed as defined.

SR 905 begins at the intersection of Tocayo Avenue and Oro Vista Road in Nestor. It begins as a freeway, intersecting with I-5 at a partial cloverleaf interchange. After interchanges with Beyer Boulevard and Picador Boulevard, the freeway then intersects I-805. Following this, SR 905 veers southeast to parallel Otay Mesa Road, with interchanges at Caliente Avenue (in Pacific Gateway Park), Britannia Boulevard, and La Media Road. Following those interchanges, SR 905 also interchanges with the SR 125 toll road and the SR 11 freeway, which is planned to be a toll facility that will serve a new border crossing east of Otay Mesa. Immediately after, SR 905 turns south to its final interchange at Siempre Viva Road before the route ends at the Otay Mesa Port of Entry, which traffic of large trucks must use to cross the border.

SR 905 is part of the California Freeway and Expressway System and part of the National Highway System, a network of highways that are considered essential to the country's economy, defense, and mobility by the Federal Highway Administration. In 2013, SR 905 had an annual average daily traffic (AADT) of 58,000 between Beyer Boulevard and I-805, and 18,400 around the I-5 junction, the former of which was the highest AADT for the freeway.

== History ==
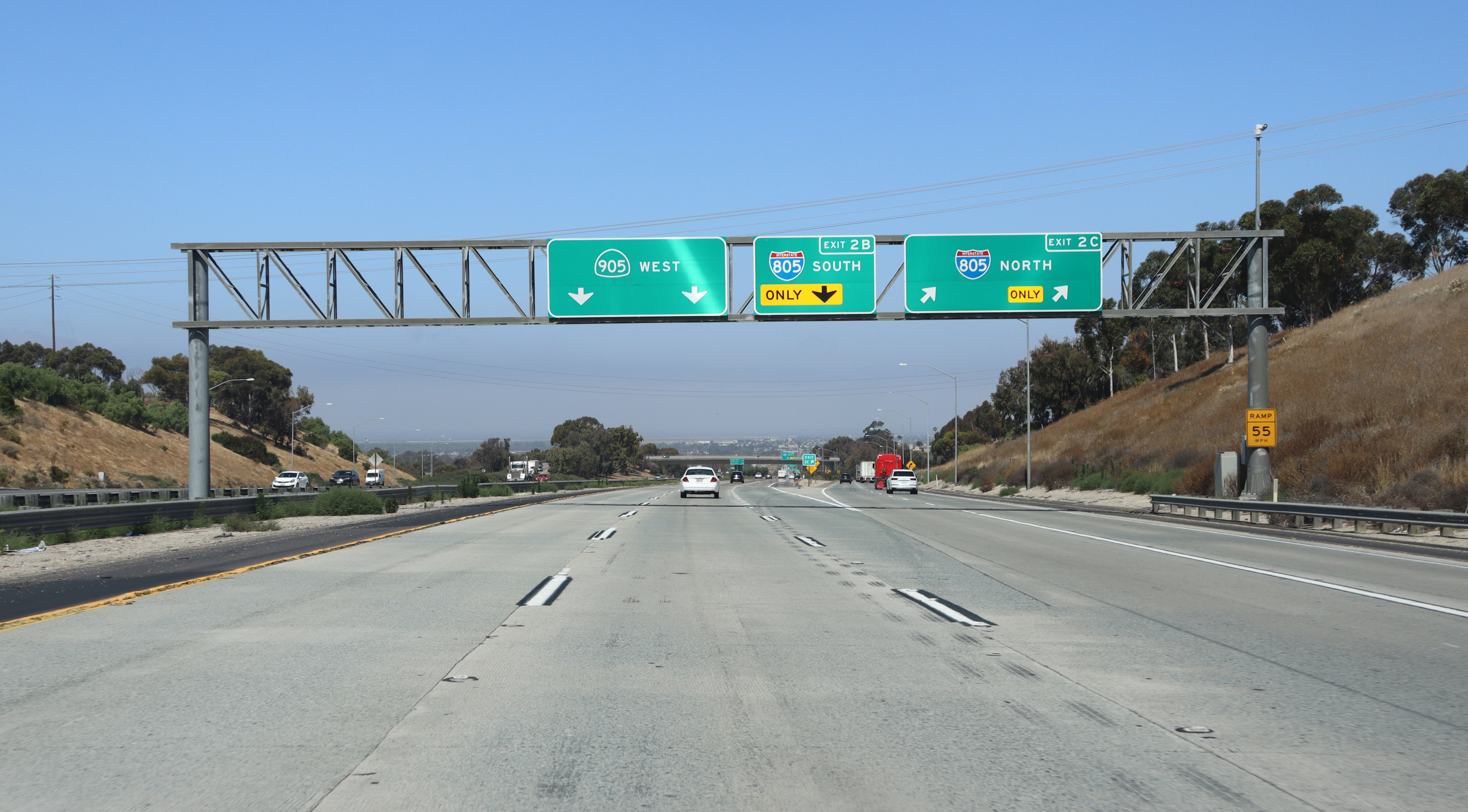
Westbound California State Route 905 at the interchange with Interstate 805.

What was known as the "Otay Mesa Road" existed as a dirt road by 1927. A paved road connected San Ysidro to Brown Field and the easternmost ranches in the Otay Mesa area by 1935. Discussions were held between San Diego County and National City over the maintenance of the road in 1950, since it was used by trucks travelling to the landfill. The majority of SR 905, running in parallel with Otay Mesa Road from I-5 to SR 125, was added to the state highway system and the California Freeway and Expressway System in 1959 as Legislative Route 281, and became part of SR 75 in the 1964 renumbering.

Planning was underway for the extension of SR 75 east to the then-proposed SR 125 by 1963. The California Highway Commission endorsed the routing for SR 75 in 1965 along Otay Mesa Road, away from future residential developments. There were plans as early as 1970 to have a highway heading southwest to a new border crossing that would bypass the Tijuana area. The next year, James Moe, the state public works director, subsequently asked the California State Legislature to lengthen SR 75 to connect to this new crossing, rather than using I-5 to make the connection.

State Route 117
- Location: San Diego
- Existed: 1972–1986

Following this, in 1972, the legislature added a new SR 117, which extended this part of SR 75 southwest to the Mexican border near Border Field State Park, to the state highway system, and a southerly extension of SR 125 to the border at Otay Mesa to the state highway and Freeway and Expressway systems. Two years later, planning began for the construction of the Otay Mesa crossing and the construction of SR 75 to connect it to I-5 and I-805. Later, the Comprehensive Planning Organization (CPO), the local association of municipal governments, recommended using $4 million of federal funding for the construction of SR 75. The CPO later endorsed expediting construction of the freeway before completion of the border crossing, so that the freeway would primarily serve border traffic, thus preventing land speculation in Otay Mesa. While Mexican authorities wanted the crossing constructed in 1975, the CPO indicated that the funding for SR 75 would not be available until at least 1980, or even 1985. Following this, Representative Lionel Van Deerlin attempted to accelerate the construction of the crossing, even though there was no funding for the highway.

Construction began on the southern portion of SR 75 in mid-1974. In January 1976, the part of SR 75 between I-805 and Otay Mesa Road was opened to traffic. On April 6, the next portion of the freeway opened. However, there were concerns about what to call the freeway, citing confusion with the northern portion of SR 75. The entire cost of the project was $6.3 million. SR 117 was extended east to SR 125, replacing the southerly segment of SR 75, by the Legislature in 1976; this took effect at the beginning of 1977. Estimates for completing the freeway ran from $13.8 million to $28.5 million.

In late 1977, the CPO made plans to push for adding SR 117 to the Interstate Highway System, to obtain additional federal funding. By 1979, both San Diego city and county had allocated $6 million to construct a temporary way to access the border crossing along Otay Mesa and Harvest Roads. Two years later, the City of San Diego indicated that the upgrade of Otay Mesa Road to a four-lane road would be the preferred option; the state agreed to allocate $2 million towards the $10 million project, with the city contributing $6.4 million and the county adding $2.3 million. The Federal Highway Administration approved the continuous roadway via SR 117 and SR 125 from I-5 to the border at Otay Mesa as a non-chargeable (not eligible for federal Interstate Highway construction dollars) part of the Interstate Highway System in October 1984. The Otay Mesa border crossing opened on January 24, 1985. The route number was legislatively changed to 905 in 1986, and signs were updated in 1988. This change was to apply for other federal funding. The original piece of SR 117, west of I-5, also became SR 905 with the rest of SR 117, but the California Department of Transportation (Caltrans) has not constructed it.

Efforts were underway in 1997 to secure federal funding for the highway and other infrastructure near the Mexican border, largely supported by Senator Barbara Boxer and Representative Bob Filner, and Representative Bud Schuster, the chairman of the House Transportation and Infrastructure Committee, visited the region before giving informal approval to the proposal. In 1999, Governor Gray Davis approved allocating $27 million in federal funding to complete the freeway. Concerns were expressed by local residents and municipal officials regarding the apparent priority of SR 125 over SR 905 in terms of funding, especially since SR 125 was to be constructed as a toll road, and SR 905 would compete with the toll road enterprise. In May 1998, Congress approved $54 million in funding for the completion of SR 905.

Otay Mesa Road was widened to six lanes in 2000 for $20.5 million. Before, it had 50 percent more traffic than it was designed to handle; it was considered by the San Diego Union-Tribune as "California's busiest trade route with Mexico." Traffic had increased by ten times, with the number of people dying in traffic accidents approaching five times the state average. The widening of Otay Mesa Road was considered a temporary fix for the problem. The next year, the California Transportation Commission allocated $25 million of state funding towards completing the freeway. The interchange with Siempre Viva Road opened on December 8, 2004. Delays in the U.S. Congress approving federal funding in 2005 resulted in a delayed start to construction for the rest of SR 905.

Construction began on the part of SR 905 between Britannia Boulevard and Siempre Viva Road in April 2008, and from Brittania Boulevard to I-805 in July 2009. Efforts were made to keep construction going despite a shortfall in funding from state bonds in 2009. The part between Britannia Boulevard and Siempre Viva Road opened in December 2010. The interchange with I-805 began to be upgraded in April 2011, and the construction, which used $20 million in federal funding, finished in February 2012. The final freeway segment of SR 905 between I-805 and Britannia Boulevard opened on July 30, 2012. The entire cost of the project connecting I-805 to the border crossing was $441 million.

Before being upgraded to a freeway between Britannia Boulevard and Siempre Viva Road, SR 905 directly connected with SR 125 via two at-grade intersections on Otay Mesa Road. When Caltrans opened that segment of the SR 905 freeway in 2010, they omitted the interchange with SR 125, forcing traffic on SR 905 and SR 125 to exit their respective freeways and use Otay Mesa Road (which SR 905 followed at that time) to make the connection. To help fix this problem, a direct freeway-to-freeway interchange was planned, which also included the new SR 11 freeway once it was to be constructed, with construction beginning in late 2015. SR 11 is planned to be a toll facility that will serve a new border crossing east of Otay Mesa. Ramps from SR 905 eastbound to SR 125 northbound, SR 905 westbound to SR 125 northbound, and SR 11 westbound to SR 125 northbound were completed on November 30, 2016, at the cost of over $21 million. Prior to December 16, 2021, traffic on southbound SR 125 was forced to exit onto Otay Mesa Road at that toll road's then southern terminus in order to connect to SR 11 and SR 905. Construction on the ramps for these connections began in 2018, with the ramps from SR 125 southbound to SR 11 eastbound and SR 125 southbound to SR 905 eastbound being completed on December 16, 2021, at the cost of $74 million. The ramp from SR 125 southbound to SR 905 westbound, which was still under construction at the time, was initially scheduled to open to traffic in 2023, but was instead opened to traffic on July 26, 2022, finally completing the interchange. There are no plans to construct the remaining connections from SR 905 westbound to SR 11 eastbound and SR 11 westbound to SR 905 eastbound.

== Future ==
=== Interstate 905 ===
Future Interstate 905
- Location: San Diego
- Length: 8.964 mi (14.426 km)

Plans are for SR 905 to become I-905; however, it could not be constructed with the same federal government funds that were used for constructing the rest of the Interstate Highway System. This is because I-905 was not constructed as of 1978, when the Surface Transportation Assistance Act of 1978 provided that all Interstate construction authorized under previous amendments to the system would be funded by the federal government but additional highway mileage added under 23 U.S.C. § 103(c)(4)(A) would not be funded from the same highway fund.

== Exit list ==
The entire route is in San Diego, San Diego County.

mi	km	Exit	Destinations	Notes
0.00	0.00		Oro Vista Road / Tocayo Avenue	At-grade intersection
0.37	0.60	1A–B	I-5 (San Diego Freeway)	Signed as exits 1A (north) and 1B (south) westbound, reversed eastbound; I-5 exit 3
0.97	1.56	1C	Beyer Boulevard	Signed as exit 1 eastbound; former US 101
1.56	2.51	2A	Picador Boulevard / Smythe Avenue	
2.32	3.73	2B	I-805 (Jacob Dekema Freeway)	Signed as exits 2B (south) and 2C (north) westbound; I-805 north exit 1B, south exit 1C
3.88	6.24	4	Caliente Avenue	
4.91	7.90	5	Heritage Road	Proposed interchange
5.94	9.56	6	Britannia Boulevard – Tijuana International Airport, Brown Field Municipal Airport	Access to Tijuana International Airport via the Cross Border Xpress
6.93	11.15	7	La Media Road	
7.68– 7.77	12.36– 12.50	8	SR 11 east	Eastbound exit and westbound entrance; western terminus of SR 11
7.68– 7.77	12.36– 12.50	8	SR 125 Toll north (South Bay Expressway)	Southern terminus of SR 125
8.53	13.73	9	Siempre Viva Road	Last U.S. exit eastbound
8.89	14.31		Mexico–United States border (Otay Mesa Port of Entry)	Continues beyond the international border as Boulevard Garita de Otay
1.000 mi = 1.609 km; 1.000 km = 0.621 mi: Incomplete access; Tolled; Unopened
