= Otay Mesa, San Diego =

- Community of San Diego
- Otay Mesa
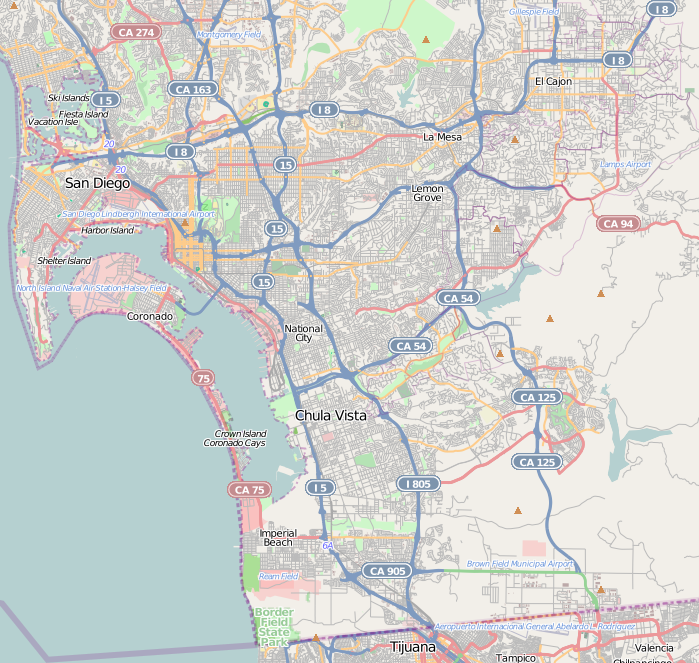
- Location within Southern San Diego
- Coordinates: 32.5583913°N 116.9425228°W
- Country: United States of America
- State: California
- County: San Diego
- City: San Diego

Population
  - Total: 23,707

Otay Mesa (/ˈoʊtaɪ ˈmeɪsə/ OH-ty MAY-sə) is a community in the southern exclave of San Diego, California, just north of the U.S.–Mexico border.

It is bordered by the Otay River Valley and the city of Chula Vista on the north; Interstate 805 and the neighborhoods of Ocean View Hills and San Ysidro on the west; unincorporated San Diego County on the north and east including East Otay Mesa and the San Ysidro Mountains; and the Otay Centenario borough of Tijuana, Mexico, on the south.

Major thoroughfares include Otay Mesa Road/California State Route 905, Otay Valley Road/Heritage Road, Siempre Viva Road, and California State Route 125. Otay Mesa is the second-least walkable neighborhood of San Diego.

== History ==
Otay is derived from the Kumeyaay language. Although its meaning is disputed, possible derivations include "otai", meaning "brushy"; "Tou-ti" meaning "big mountain"; or "etaay" meaning "big". Mesa is the Spanish word for plateau, table or tableland.

Aviation pioneer John J. Montgomery made the first controlled flights in the western hemisphere using a series of gliders from the west rim of Otay Mesa in 1883/1884.

The area which now includes Otay Mesa was annexed from San Diego County along with other portions of South San Diego in 1957. Additional annexation of almost four thousand acres was approved in 1985.

Since 2010, seven cross-border tunnels have been found linking warehouses in Otay Mesa with entry points within Mexico.

== Climate ==
Otay Mesa has a semi-arid climate (Köppen climate classification: Bsk) with mild winters and warm, almost rainless summers.

Climate data for Brown Field Municipal Airport (normals 1998–2020, extremes 1945–1946, 1954–1961, 1998–present)
Month	Jan	Feb	Mar	Apr	May	Jun	Jul	Aug	Sep	Oct	Nov	Dec	Year
Record high °F (°C)	90 (32)	93 (34)	97 (36)	99 (37)	102 (39)	103 (39)	110 (43)	102 (39)	108 (42)	103 (39)	99 (37)	87 (31)	110 (43)
Mean maximum °F (°C)	82.4 (28.0)	81.8 (27.7)	83.7 (28.7)	85.8 (29.9)	85.5 (29.7)	88.8 (31.6)	91.4 (33.0)	92.9 (33.8)	98.2 (36.8)	93.7 (34.3)	88.5 (31.4)	80.3 (26.8)	100.6 (38.1)
Mean daily maximum °F (°C)	67.0 (19.4)	66.4 (19.1)	67.5 (19.7)	69.8 (21.0)	71.2 (21.8)	74.3 (23.5)	78.3 (25.7)	80.6 (27.0)	79.8 (26.6)	76.7 (24.8)	71.8 (22.1)	66.7 (19.3)	72.5 (22.5)
Daily mean °F (°C)	55.7 (13.2)	55.8 (13.2)	57.4 (14.1)	59.9 (15.5)	62.8 (17.1)	66.1 (18.9)	69.9 (21.1)	71.8 (22.1)	70.3 (21.3)	66.0 (18.9)	60.2 (15.7)	55.3 (12.9)	62.6 (17.0)
Mean daily minimum °F (°C)	44.4 (6.9)	45.2 (7.3)	47.3 (8.5)	50.0 (10.0)	54.4 (12.4)	57.9 (14.4)	61.5 (16.4)	63.0 (17.2)	60.8 (16.0)	55.3 (12.9)	48.6 (9.2)	43.8 (6.6)	52.7 (11.5)
Mean minimum °F (°C)	35.2 (1.8)	36.2 (2.3)	39.4 (4.1)	41.8 (5.4)	47.2 (8.4)	51.6 (10.9)	56.9 (13.8)	57.1 (13.9)	53.0 (11.7)	47.3 (8.5)	40.2 (4.6)	34.6 (1.4)	32.9 (0.5)
Record low °F (°C)	27 (−3)	30 (−1)	34 (1)	34 (1)	41 (5)	44 (7)	50 (10)	52 (11)	48 (9)	38 (3)	32 (0)	29 (−2)	27 (−3)
Average precipitation inches (mm)	1.83 (46)	2.39 (61)	1.52 (39)	0.80 (20)	0.27 (6.9)	0.10 (2.5)	0.04 (1.0)	0.01 (0.25)	0.18 (4.6)	0.44 (11)	0.83 (21)	1.82 (46)	10.23 (260)
Average precipitation days (≥ 0.01 in)	6.6	7.4	7.5	6.0	3.2	1.5	1.3	0.9	2.1	3.5	5.1	6.9	52
Source: NOAA

== Border crossings ==
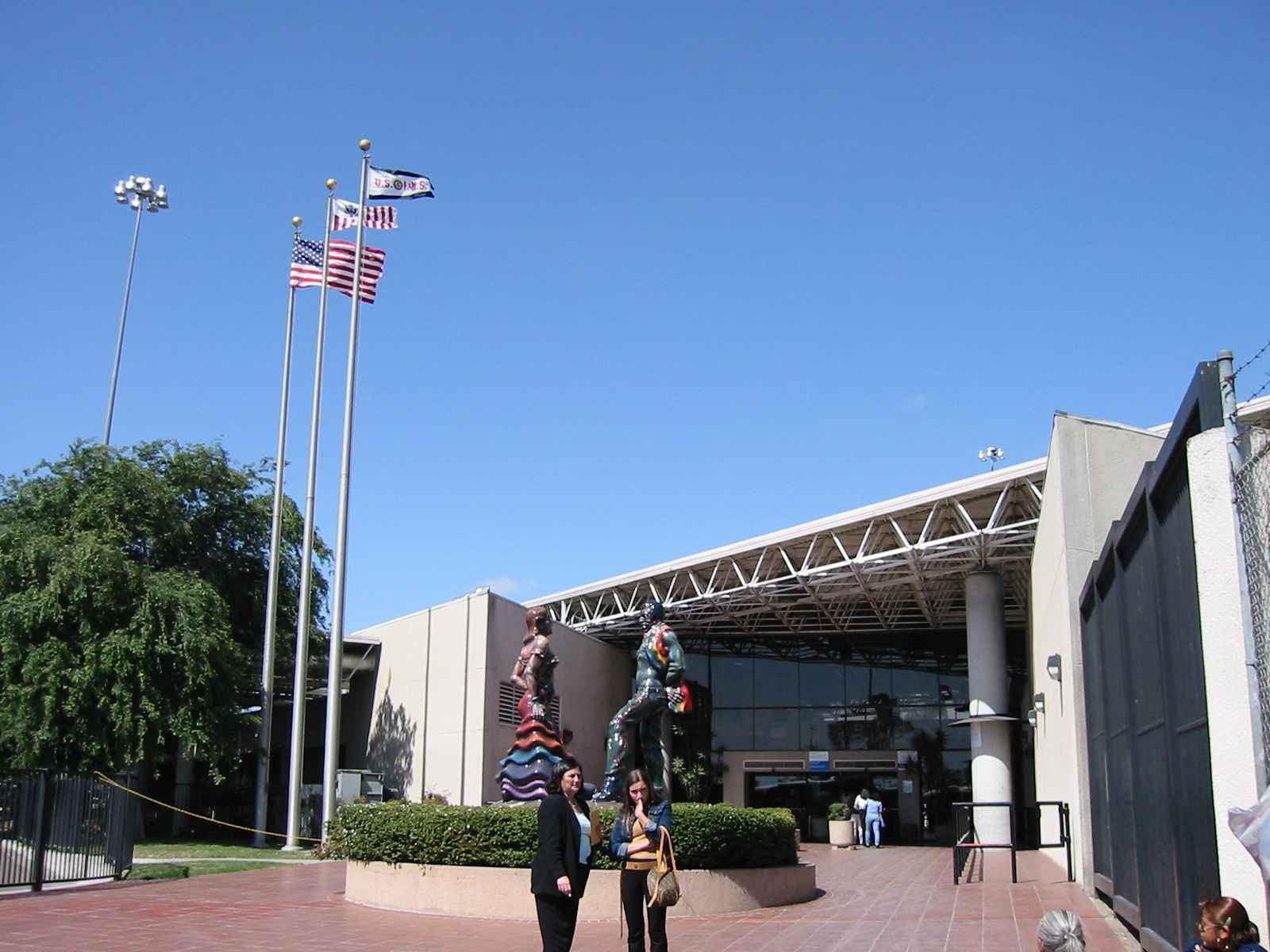
Otay Mesa Port of Entry

The Otay Mesa Port of Entry is one of two border crossings within the city of San Diego, the other being the San Ysidro Port of Entry six miles to the west. Trucks are generally instructed to use the border crossing in Otay Mesa instead of the San Ysidro one. Otay Mesa also houses an immigration detention center.

Two miles east of the Otay Mesa border crossing in the unincorporated area of East Otay Mesa, the new Otay Mesa East Port of Entry is planned to be in service as early as 2028.

The Cross Border Xpress (CBX) is a terminal serving and a pedestrian bridge crossing to the main terminal of Tijuana International Airport. This crossing has a 45,000-square-foot (4,200 m^{2}) facility in Otay Mesa. It was established by Otay-Tijuana Ventures LLC and had a cost of $78 million and opened in 2015. CBX makes Tijuana Airport the world's first geographically binational airport, because unlike the binational airports serving the Swiss cities of Basel (entirely on French territory) and Geneva (entirely on Swiss territory), the CBX terminal is physically located in the United States but serves an airport whose main terminal and runways are in Mexico.

== Highways ==
I-5
I-805
SR 11

SR 125 Toll
SR 905 (Future I-905)

== Other landmarks and facilities ==
Located 1.5 miles north of the Mexico-United States Border, is the 603 megawatt Otay Mesa Energy Center, which came online in 2009. This power plant will be joined with the Pio Pico Energy Center peaker, which will generate an additional 300 megawatts.

Pacific Gateway Park is located between Otay Mesa Road and the international border.

Five major law-enforcement facilities are located in an unincorporated area in the Otay Mesa region:

- the state's Richard J. Donovan Correctional Facility
- Otay Mesa Detention Center, privately operated by CoreCivic, formerly called Corrections Corporation of America(CCA)
- the George Bailey County Detention facility
- the East Mesa Detention facility, operated by the City of San Diego
- and a multi-jurisdictional law enforcement firearms training complex used by the FBI, the Customs Service, and local police forces

== Education ==
Otay Mesa is in the San Ysidro School District (SYSD) and the Sweetwater Union High School District (SUHSD).

Public schools in and near Otay Mesa include:

- Finney Elementary School
- Juarez Lincon Elementary School
- Los Altos Elementary School
- Howard Pence Elementary School
- Silverwing Elementary School
- San Ysidro Elementary School

The area is zoned to Montgomery High School.

== See also ==
- Mexico–United States border
