= East Otay Mesa, California =

Unincorporated community in California, United States

Coordinates: 32.5761°N 116.9329°W

East Otay Mesa is an as-yet undeveloped area in the South Bay region of unincorporated San Diego County, California.

It is located along the northern side of the Mexico–United States border, with plans for future developments, including a border crossing and business park. East Otay Mesa is immediately east of the Otay Mesa neighborhood of the city of San Diego, west of the San Ysidro Mountains, and north of the Centenario borough of Tijuana, Mexico.

The Otay Mesa East Port of Entry (also "Otay Mesa II"), a planned border crossing, is to connect East Otay Mesa with Centenario, Tijuana.
