= Otay Centenario =

- Borough (Delegación) of Tijuana
- Delegación Otay Centenario
- Location in Tijuana
- Coordinates: 32.535856°N 116.943111°W
- Country: Mexico
- State: Baja California
- Municipality (municipio): Tijuana
- Area code: 664

Otay Centenario is a borough of the municipality of Tijuana in Baja California, Mexico. It is the result of a merger between the former boroughs of Mesa de Otay and Centenario which took place on January 1, 2014.

The borough is located east of the Centro borough and the Zona Río; south of the U.S. border and San Diego's Otay Mesa neighborhood; and north of La Mesa.

Tijuana International Airport, and many maquiladoras are located here. Main shopping centers are the Centro Comercial Otay and Plaza Americana Otay, which is located in front of Centro Comercial Otay. The area is noted as the second gastronomic hub of the city, with many restaurants.

The former Centenario borough has the largest number of factories and maquiladoras in the city. Its largest neighborhood (colonia) is Ciudad Industrial ("Industrial City"). Three of the city's most important streets, Boulevard Bellas Artes, Boulevard Industrial and Mexican Federal Highway 2, are located here.

Parque de la Amistad (not to be confused with Friendship Park at the border in Playas de Tijuana) is a large park in the borough.

== Education ==
The Instituto Tecnológico de Tijuana^{es} (Technological Institute of Tijuana) and the Autonomous University of Baja California, Tijuana are located in the borough.

== Border crossing facilities ==
This area contains the Otay Mesa Port of Entry to Otay Mesa, San Diego, and the planned new Otay Mesa East Port of Entry will connect Otay-Centenario with the area of East Otay Mesa in San Diego County.
