= Air/Space America 88 =

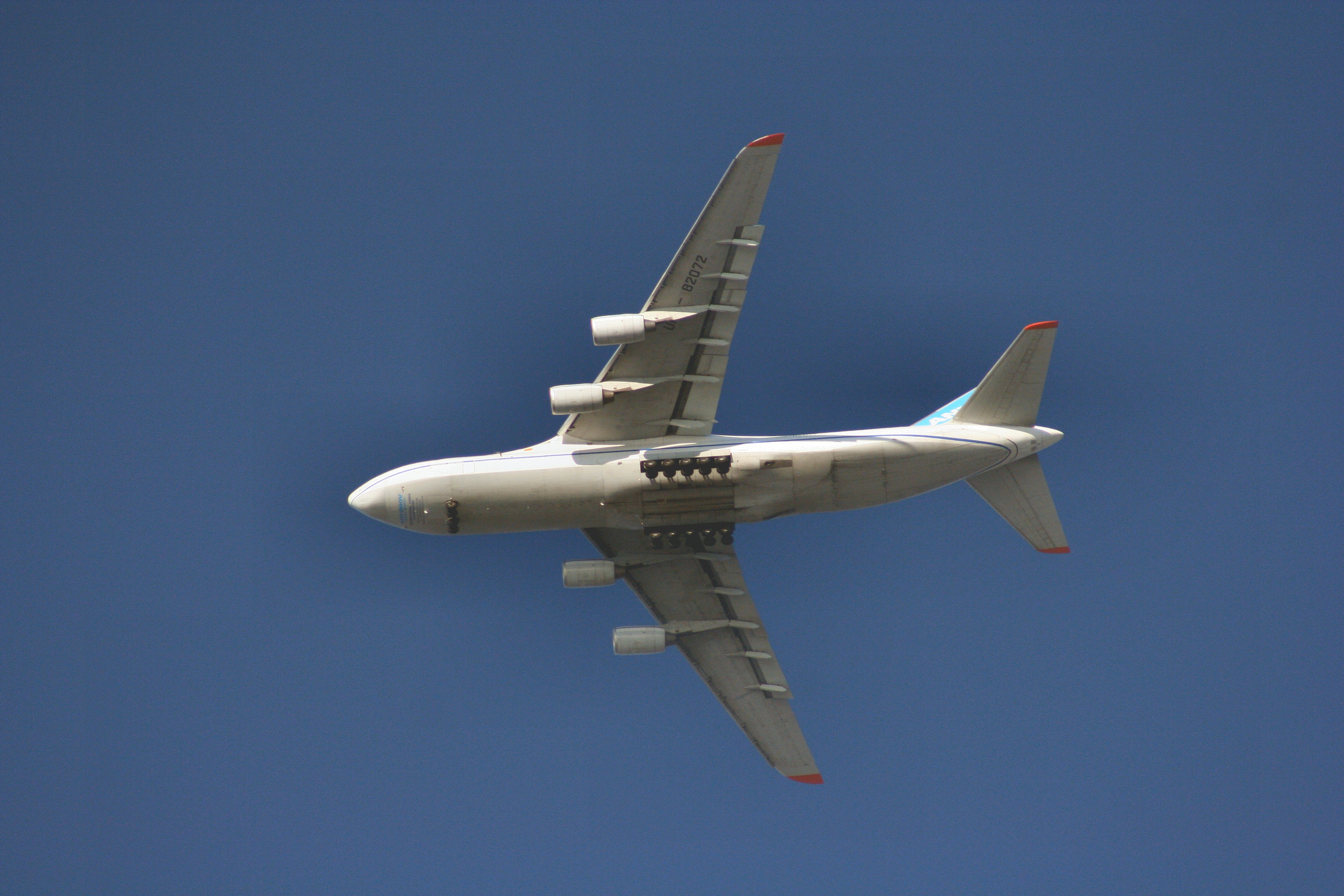
- Antonov An-124 Rusłan
- Genre: Air show
- Dates: 1988
- Venue: Brown Field
- Location: San Diego, California
- Country: U.S.A.

Air/Space America 88 was an aviation exposition and airshow held at San Diego, California's Brown Field in late May of 1988. It was planned to be the western hemisphere's answer to the Paris Air Show and would be held every even year when the PAS was in hiatus. It was a mammoth event that attracted exhibitors from all over the world, including an Air France Concorde registered F-BVFF and an Antonov An-124. Many aircraft manufacturers brought their latest creations like Boeing's STOL YC-14. The U.S. Air Force Thunderbirds performed along with the usual aerobatic and demonstration flights. Founded by former US Congressman Robert Carlton "Bob" Wilson. Former Vice President of the United States, George HW Bush presided at the ribbon cutting ceremony. Congressman Wilson engaged Mr. Daniel S. Mitrovich to serve as Chief Protocol Officer for the visiting Soviets Air expedition with the worlds largest Aircraft the Antonov An-124 Russian aircraft. Mr. Mitrovich was the first American to fly on the worlds largest aircraft at the invitation of the soviet pilots.

Air/Space America 88 was a tremendous success as an air show but was a financial failure resulting in the cancellation of Air/Space America 90.
