= California State Route 125 =

Highway in California

State Route 125
- SR 125 highlighted in red

Route information
- Maintained by Caltrans and SANDAG
- Length: 22.302 mi (35.892 km)
- Tourist routes: SR 125 between SR 94 in Spring Valley and I-8 in La Mesa

Major junctions
- South end: SR 11 / SR 905 in Otay Mesa
- SR 54 near Chula Vista; SR 94 in Spring Valley; I-8 in La Mesa
- North end: SR 52 in Santee

Location
- Country: United States
- State: California
- Counties: San Diego

Highway system
- State highways in California; Interstate; US; State; Scenic; History; Pre‑1964; Unconstructed; Deleted; Freeways
← SR 124	→ SR 126

State Route 125 (SR 125) is a state highway in the U.S. state of California that serves as a north–south route in San Diego County. It runs from SR 11 and SR 905 in Otay Mesa, near the Mexican border, to SR 52 in Santee. SR 125 also connects SR 54, SR 94, and Interstate 8 (I-8).

The first parts of SR 125 were added to the state highway system in 1933, connecting Route 94 with US 80. In the 1964 state highway renumbering, what was signed as Route 67 was transferred to the new SR 125. After several delays in funding and in planning, the highway was extended north to SR 52 and south to SR 54 in the early 2000s.

The southern portion of SR 125 from SR 11 and SR 905 to SR 54 near Chula Vista is a toll road called the South Bay Expressway. This portion was completed in 2007 after many years of planning and litigation related to concerns over the destruction of endangered species habitat. The toll road was operated by a public-private partnership known as South Bay Expressway LLC. However, the partnership declared bankruptcy in 2010 and sold the road to the San Diego Association of Governments (SANDAG) in 2011. Since then, following a decrease in the toll amount, traffic using the highway has increased.

== Route description ==
Route 125 is defined in section 425 of the California Streets and Highways Code:

Route 125 is from:
(a) Route 905 near Brown Field to Route 54.
(b) Route 54 to Route 94 near La Mesa.
(c) Route 94 near La Mesa to Route 56.

Route 125 was not fully constructed to extend north to Route 56 as it is defined.

SR 125 begins as the South Bay Expressway toll road at an interchange with SR 11 and SR 905. The route heads north through an undeveloped area, encountering its first toll plaza just before entering the city of Chula Vista. The freeway cuts through the Eastlake neighborhood of Chula Vista before leaving the city and turning to the northeast, passing through Sweetwater Summit Regional Park near Sweetwater Reservoir. SR 125 intersects with SR 54, where the tolled portion ends. SR 54 runs concurrently with SR 125 north to the Jamacha Road exit. SR 125 continues north again through the unincorporated area of La Presa. The freeway briefly enters Lemon Grove before intersecting with SR 94 and crossing into the city of La Mesa.

Passing to the west of Mount Helix, SR 125 interchanges with I-8 before continuing north through the city of El Cajon near Grossmont College. The freeway continues into suburban Santee, where the route terminates just north of the SR 52 interchange. Traffic can continue onto SR 52 or Mission Gorge Road at the terminus.

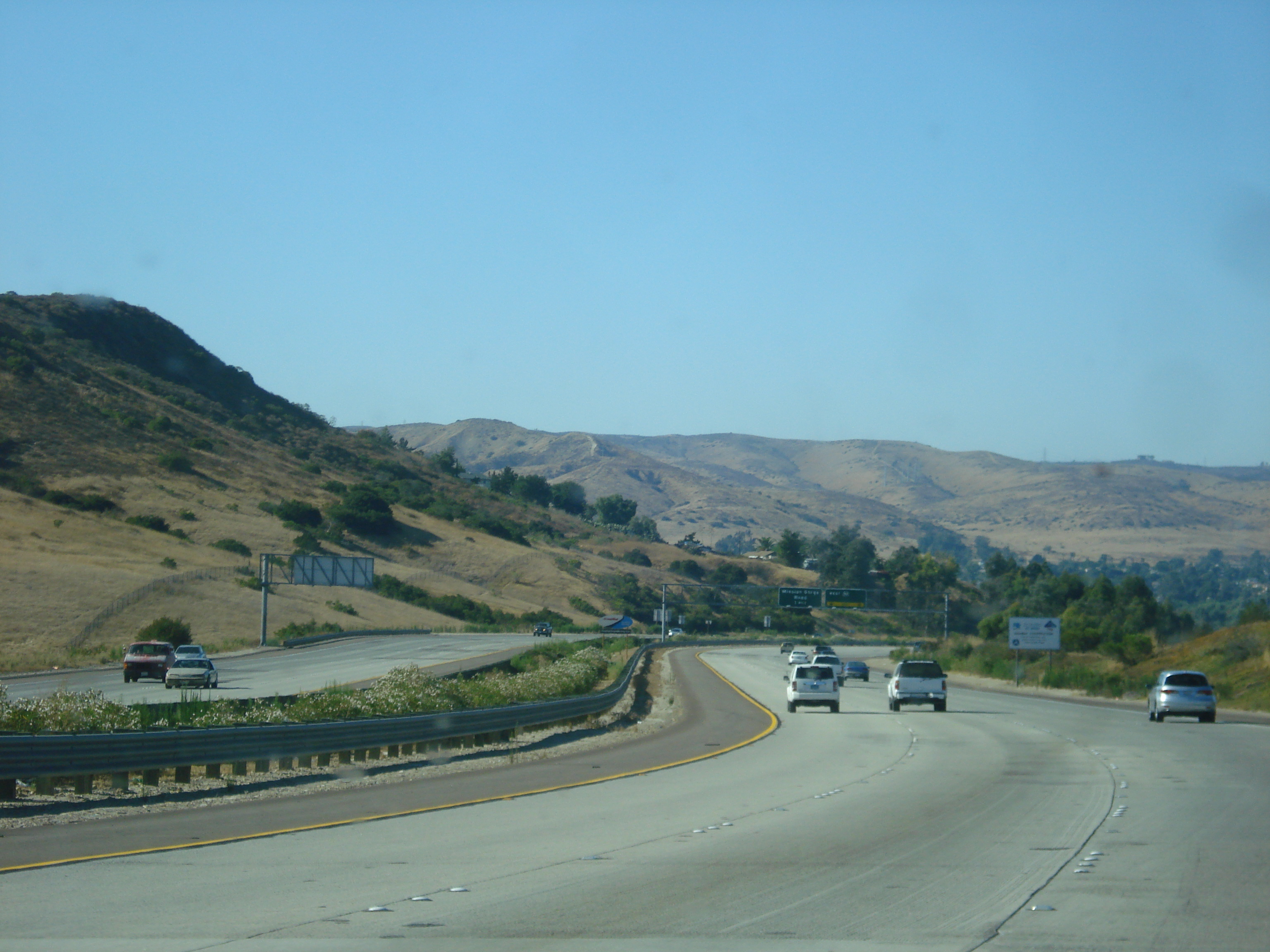
SR 125 near Santee, CA

SR 125 is part of the California Freeway and Expressway System, and is part of the National Highway System, a network of highways that are considered essential to the country's economy, defense, and mobility by the Federal Highway Administration. The route is eligible to be included in the State Scenic Highway System, but it is only a scenic highway from SR 94 to I-8 as designated by the California Department of Transportation (Caltrans), meaning that it is a substantial section of highway passing through a "memorable landscape" with no "visual intrusions", where the potential designation has gained popular favor with the community. In 2018, SR 125 had an annual average daily traffic (AADT) of 10,200 vehicles between the Otay River Bridge and Olympic Parkway, and 183,000 vehicles between SR 94 and Lemon Avenue, the latter of which was the highest AADT for the highway.

== History ==
=== Route 67 ===
Added to the state highway system in 1933, and defined in 1935, Route 198 extended from US 80 onto La Mesa Boulevard and Palm Avenue to SR 94 by 1938. In 1947, the San Diego County Highway Development Association requested that the highway from Sixth Avenue in Mission Valley to US 80 be constructed as a freeway. Although state senator Fred Kraft criticized the proposal in July 1953 because he believed that it would be too expensive and would not reduce congestion in the long-term, especially around the junction with US 80 in Grossmont, approval for the Route 94 freeway extended to the junction with US 80 by October, with the Grossmont part of the route signed as Route 67. The Route 67 freeway was completed in March 1957, from Campo Road and Route 94 to US 80; the project was completed for $1,625,000 (about $14 million in 2025 dollars).

=== Planning and Poway extension ===
Planning for what would become SR 125 north of I-8 began in 1954. Route 282 was defined as a route from Brown Field through La Mesa extending to Route 277 in 1959, and in 1961 the latter terminus was changed to Route 278. The California Highway Commission selected a route for the highway in mid-1963. In the 1964 state highway renumbering, SR 125 was designated as the highway from SR 75 near Brown Field to SR 56. Route 198 was renumbered as SR 67; the portion south of I-8 was renumbered as SR 125.

In early 1964, the La Mesa City Council expressed their preference for Route 282, which had been nicknamed the Ramona Freeway, to run on the routing of Fletcher Parkway, contrary to local businesses that wanted the highway to be routed 0.25 miles (0.40 km) west of the parkway. A few months later, state engineer Jacob Dekema indicated that there were four routes under consideration for the portion from Brown Field to Sweetwater Lake. The project would not be completed until well after 1972. The state had selected a route for that part of the highway by June, and for the routing west of Fletcher Parkway extending to Mission Gorge Road by July. The following year, the California Highway Commission approved a routing north of Mission Gorge Road into Poway and ending at SR 56.

In the 1970s, planning continued for the construction of the route, as well as modifications to the existing roadway. The City of La Mesa began discussions regarding adding SR 125 from SR 94 to I-8 into the scenic highway system in 1968; the county Planning Commission continued pursuing these plans in 1970. SR 125 was lengthened by the Legislature to extend to the Mexican border in 1972. In 1973, then-governor Ronald Reagan vetoed a bill to delete part of SR 125 from state plans, over concerns that not enough transportation studies had been done on the matter. An improved interchange with SR 94 was being planned the next year. Soon after, the California Department of Transportation (Caltrans) raised concerns about the remainder of SR 125 not being constructed, due to objections from the community relating to freeway construction in general.

Construction began on the SR 94 interchange in October, and continued into late 1975, at a cost of $11 million (about $51 million in 2025 dollars). Parts of the interchange with SR 94 were open by July 20. The City of Chula Vista considered SR 125 as possibly having scenic value when constructed, and considered asking the state to add it to the state highway system; this influenced a rule that construction projects near possible scenic routes in the city had to take natural aesthetics into account. The La Mesa City Council asked the state to modify the interchange with I-8 in July; the original interchange did not allow for access to SR 125 from I-8 east or to I-8 west from SR 125.

In January of the following year, state Assemblyman Wadie Deddeh proposed legislation to remove the southern portion of SR 125 from the state highway plans again. Soon afterward, the Comprehensive Planning Organization (CPO) moved to support retaining SR 125 from Poway to Santee in the county transportation plan, despite opposition from a county supervisor and the mayor of Escondido. Deddeh's bill passed the state Assembly Transportation Committee a month later; in the meeting, Deddeh noted the construction of I-805 to handle the traffic demands of the region, as well as a lack of funding that would result in the construction being delayed for at least 20 years. Despite a petition from the mayor of Escondido, the CPO again declined to remove SR 125 from the county transportation plan in March.

The new interchange with SR 94 was completed in July 1976. In August, the California Highway Commission (CHC) announced that SR 75 south of SR 54 had been removed from the state highway plan. The next year, the county supervisor, a San Diego City councilman, and the mayors of La Mesa and National City wrote a letter to then-Governor Jerry Brown to ask that this portion of SR 125 and other freeways be constructed. There were concerns about the types of congestion seen in Los Angeles coming to San Diego due to the incomplete freeway system. San Diego City Councilman Tom Gade wrote a telegram to the Caltrans Director Adriana Gianturco about the possible deletions; in response, Gianturco clarified that the plans were only being reconsidered and had not been removed, and a CHC member criticized the tone of the original telegram, calling it "intemperate." However, the city of Chula Vista was opposed to the construction at the time, which was a factor in the removal of SR 125 from the highway plans.

In March 1980, the CPO approved the funding for the redesign of the interchange with I-8. By early 1980, SR 125 was denoted with signs saying "To 94" at Grossmont Summit; plans were to provide access north to Fletcher Parkway in the revamp of the interchange. On December 30, 1980, the City of Poway included SR 56 in the city plan extending east through the city to a northern extension of SR 125.

By 1981, an environmental impact report had been completed on the proposed changes to the I-8 intersection, and the $50 million (about $150 million in 2025 dollars) project to add ramps and widen I-8 was awaiting clearance from the Federal Highway Administration. That year, Poway removed SR 125 from their city plan, leading to a lawsuit from the City of San Diego. In 1983, both the cities of San Diego and Poway supported the extension of SR 56 to SR 67, although the City of Poway wanted the route moved and had reservations about the freeway ending there. The next year, the San Diego Association of Governments (SANDAG) suggested routing SR 125 through the city of Poway, rather than terminating the route further to the south as Poway had requested. Jacob Dekema was asked to advise the city of Poway in the dispute following his departure from the Caltrans district director position.

The proposal to extend SR 125 north into Poway was discussed as late as 2003 by a local advisory group working with the San Diego Association of Governments. The City of Poway opposed the plan in 2001, saying that SR 67 should be improved instead; it had been removed from city plans in 1980. So far, no proposals to extend SR 125 further north have been included in SANDAG's 2050 Regional Transportation Plan.

=== Construction from SR 52 to SR 54 ===
In 1986, the project revamping the I-8 interchange was under way, at a cost of $80 million (about $199 million in 2025 dollars); it would allow for SR 125 to be extended north past I-8 to Fletcher Parkway. That year, SR 125 was truncated to begin at SR 905 by the Legislature, as the latter was formed as a route from I-5 to the border. In 1988, work was under way to add lanes to SR 125 from south of Lemon Avenue to the northern terminus, at a cost of $17.2 million. The next year, some Bonita residents raised objections about the proposed extension south of La Mesa, as they were concerned about additional congestion and urbanization from the freeway going through Bonita.

The California Transportation Commission decided to reallocate the funding for the part of SR 125 from SR 94 to SR 54; they shifted it towards finishing the 40th Street portion of I-15. A year later, the city of Santee expressed concerns about expanding SR 125 and SR 52 to Santee before both those roadways were connected to SR 67, due to the increased traffic that would result. However, Caltrans said this was unavoidable due to a lack of funds to make the connections right away.

La Mesa residents also expressed concerns about the destruction of homes under some of the proposals for the Amaya Drive interchange design, which the city council also endorsed. However, the council approved the construction and design of the Fletcher Parkway interchange in January 1991, over those objections. Further interchange-related concerns were raised from Lemon Grove homeowners the next year. In August 1993, Caltrans agreed to design the new freeway to keep it west of Sweetwater Reservoir, which satisfied Spring Valley while raising concerns from those living in Bonita, who would be closer to this new routing.

The northern portion of SR 125 would be built in stages, at the same time as the portion south of SR 94. The reconstruction of the interchange with I-8 was completed in April 1993. The construction process began in April 1996, at a cost of $177 million in sales tax revenue. The first phase of the construction of the eastern portion of the SR 54 freeway corresponded with the construction of SR 125 north of Jamacha Boulevard to SR 94; construction began in 1996 at the cost of $313.5 million, using money from sales tax revenue. The plans were to exclude the controversial ramps at Troy and Palm streets. After weather-related construction delays due to the El Niño season of the winter of 1997–1998, as well as a contractor declaring bankruptcy, the extension of SR 52 between Mission Gorge Road and SR 125 was dedicated on May 9, 1998, as well as SR 125 from Mission Gorge Road to Grossmont College Drive.

Others raised some complaints during construction on the freeway south of SR 94. A proposed drainage basin raised concerns about a potential breeding ground for mosquitoes being located near homes. Caltrans was later ordered by local courts to pay settlements in the millions of dollars to local business owners for undervaluing property taken by eminent domain.

The portion from Fletcher Parkway to ramps located at Amaya Drive was finished at the beginning of 2001. The segment north to Navajo Road was due to open later that year, and the part from there to Grossmont College Drive was to begin construction in early 2001.

The H. Lee House, a historic site built in 1928, was relocated by Caltrans for $1.5 million to the City Center Park in Lemon Grove. The portion from SR 94 to Jamacha Boulevard was completed in 2003 for $277 million; at this time, the only part of the freeway from SR 54 to SR 52 not complete was between Navajo Road and Grossmont College Drive. During the construction, residents were inconvenienced by dirt, excess noise, and lights operating at nighttime. The entire freeway from SR 52 to I-8 was completed by mid-2004.

=== South Bay Expressway ===
==== Construction ====
Environmental impact studies began on the part of SR 125 south of SR 54 in 1987. In 1990, Caltrans proposed building the southern portion as a toll road, operated by private firms; California Transportation Ventures (CTV) and PrivaCAL both applied for the role. In September, state officials approved this proposal, which was expected to cost $400 million. In the 1991 agreement, Caltrans agreed not to build more than one high-occupancy vehicle lane in each direction on I-805 to reduce competition from SR 125. CTV soon declared that they would be considering many potential routings for the road, including some that Caltrans had declined. The next year, while the company hoped to start the environmental impact study, objections were raised about increased pollution and traffic from the road, as well as the part of the franchise agreement that would allow for the company to collect a settlement if SR 905 was constructed with more than six lanes, since it would compete with the proposed toll road.

The California Transportation Commission agreed to ensure that the southern connection from SR 125 to the new toll road would be funded in May 1996. Much of the routing for SR 125 south of SR 54 was determined in March 1997, and the Federal Highway Administration determined the "San Miguel Connector" routing that would connect the new freeway with SR 54 in August. The selection of the route, due to concerns over the destruction of the habitat of the Least Bell's Vireo, led to objections from county officials due to the proximity to homes and passing through the Bonita Golf Course and a Little League field. CTV spent $14 million on improving parks, and building Little League fields and trails to offset effects of the construction of the road. However, the construction of both SR 125 and Olympic Parkway were considered by Chula Vista officials to be essential for the further development for the eastern part of that city.

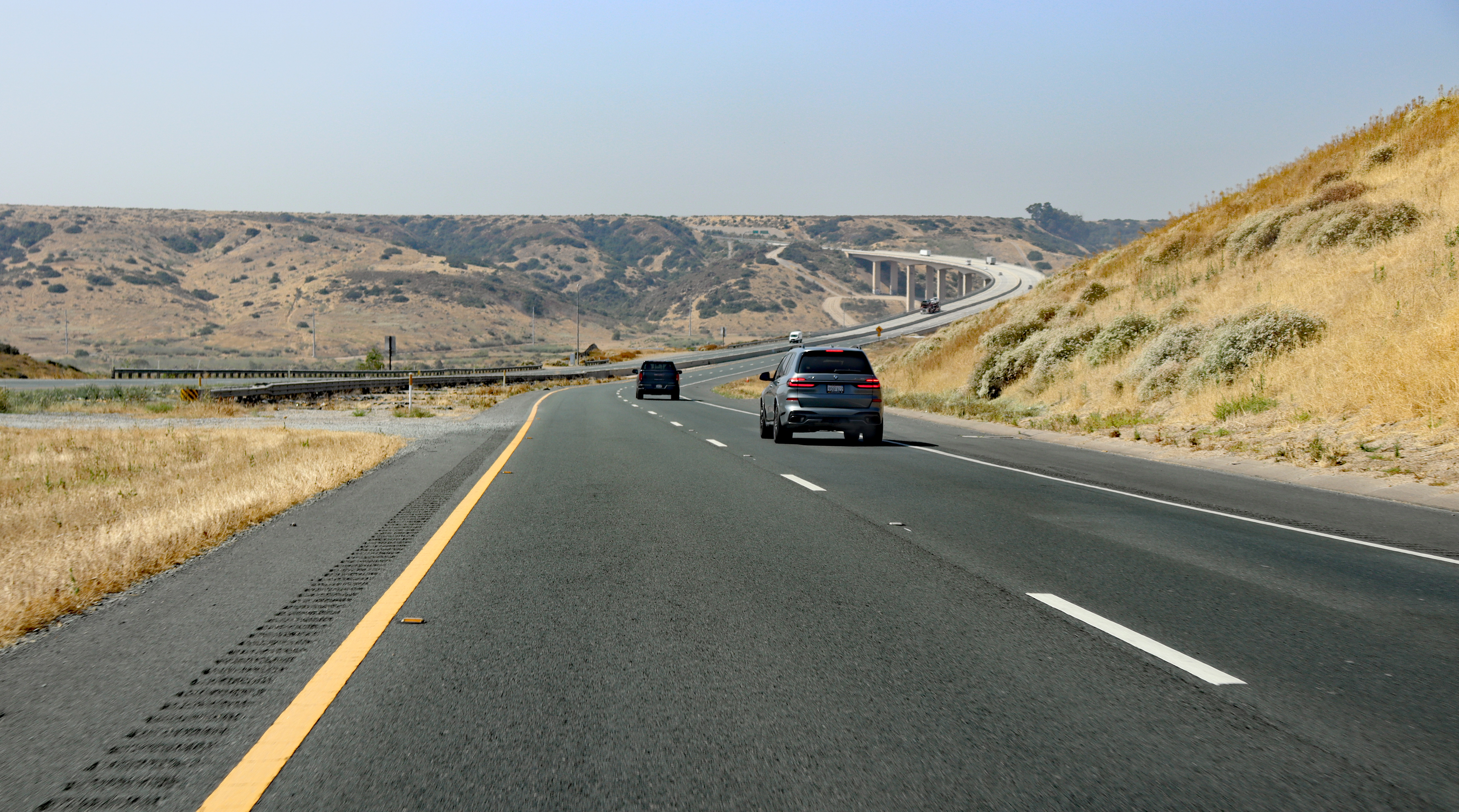
Southbound traffic on the South Bay Expressway approaching the bridge over the Otay River.

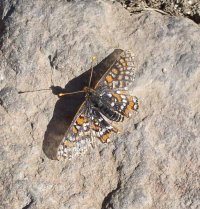
The Quino checkerspot butterfly, one of the endangered species that was the subject of environmental concerns related to the tollway construction

Concerns about the destruction of the Quino checkerspot butterfly were raised by the community group Preserve South Bay. That group sued the developer as well as Caltrans and SANDAG in August 1999, following the latter's approval for the project. Early the next year, an environmental impact report suggested that Bonita might face negative effects from the freeway, such as noise and having the roadway divide the community. The Federal Highway Administration (FHWA) allowed the project that year, even though the Environmental Protection Agency objected to it. A contractor for the project was soon retained by California Transportation Ventures. Another group, Citizens for 125, obtained 7,000 signatures in support of the road.

However, the San Diego Regional Water Quality Control Board withheld its permit approval in December 2000 over concerns that Sweetwater Reservoir could be polluted in the process. Such an approval was necessary under the Clean Water Act in order to get the necessary approval from the U.S. Army Corps of Engineers (USACE). The suit by Preserve South Bay was dismissed in March 2001, on the grounds that the legislature did not need to review the annexation of state parkland for the highway because it was done under eminent domain. In April, the San Diego Regional Water Quality Control Board approved the project on several conditions, including monitoring the water quality to ensure that Sweetwater Reservoir would remain a clean water source for local residents. An appeal to the state Water Resources Control Board to overturn the approval was unsuccessful. In July, the USACE approved the wetlands permit for the southern portion of SR 125.

The Sierra Club and the San Diego National Audubon Society, as well as some other groups, sued the FHWA, USACE, and U.S. Fish and Wildlife Service to block the construction of the toll road over alleged breaches of the Endangered Species Act in October 2001; however, a San Diego judge sided with the contractor and the federal government in March 2003. The developer resolved the environmental concerns for $3.07 million and an agreement to work outside breeding times for the endangered species involved in May of that year. In return, the environmental groups agreed not to appeal the court decision. Some community groups also opposed the project.

Construction of the SR 125 toll road started in September 2003; it was projected to open in 2006. Over the next few years, 1.5 million cubic meters of rock were blasted through in 160 separate explosions to allow for the interchange with SR 54 to be built. In 2005, the road was given the South Bay Expressway name. The South Bay Expressway extended SR 125 southward from SR 54 to Otay Mesa. This toll road was one of four privately financed toll highway projects, including the 91 Express Toll Lanes, that were approved in 1990; it was also one of two toll roads financed and controlled by both public and private sources, although the 91 Express Lanes, the other road, soon became entirely publicly owned. A partnership known as the South Bay Expressway operated the road, while Australian investment bank Macquarie Group handled financial and construction matters.

By 2006, the contractor had encountered delays due to material and worker shortages. The initial toll rates were announced in early 2007, with the lowest toll set at 75 cents. The toll road opened on November 19 of that year. The entire cost of the expressway portion was $843 million, paid for by South Bay Expressway to own the franchise on the tolled portion of SR 125. The interchange with SR 54 was constructed with $160 million of public funding.

==== Bankruptcy ====
In 2008, 30,000 vehicles a day traveled on the expressway, which fulfilled state expectations; however, complaints were made about the toll machines, due to their low height and needing the exact amount of the toll. In late 2009, the South Bay Expressway partnership that operated the road questioned the value of the toll road for property tax purposes, saying that it was worth $330 million less than it was originally valued due to the low volumes of traffic using the road. On March 22, 2010, the toll road's operator filed for Chapter 11 bankruptcy protection, citing traffic counts running at less than 40 percent of initial estimates due to the economic downturn. Some drivers chose not to use the toll road due to a recent increase in tolls. An editorial in the San Diego Union-Tribune also blamed the delay in opening the toll road and the associated penalties, interest, and legal fees for the company's financial status. According to the bankruptcy filing, the expressway had $510 million of loans outstanding, of which $170 million was owed to the U.S. Department of Transportation. In addition, there was over $600 million of unresolved litigation with the construction contractors. The gross earnings (EBITDA) for the fiscal year ending June 30, 2009 were approximately $3 million on revenues of $21 million.

Discussions regarding a potential SANDAG purchase of the road began in October 2010. On July 29, 2011, SANDAG agreed to purchase the lease of the freeway from South Bay Expressway LLC; even though a study suggested that the agency might have to spend millions of dollars on maintaining and repairing parts of the highway. Objections raised to the purchase during the negotiation phase included needing a loan from the federal government of $1.5 million to complete the purchase, and a possible increase in traffic through Lemon Grove. The sale of the franchise rights until the year 2042 was finalized on December 16, 2011, at a price of $341.4 million, and $10.2 million in additional fees, with $254 million from TransNet sales tax revenue, some of it to be repaid with toll revenue. SANDAG claimed at the time that they would reduce the tolls to attract increased use and decrease traffic on I-805, which would mean that additional lanes would not need to be constructed on that route. Despite this, the operator decided to increase tolls instead even with the low demand for using the road; the San Diego Union-Tribune criticized the decision. In mid-2011, it cost $4 to drive the entire toll portion of the road.

Tolls on the tolled section were reduced in 2012 to 25 to 40 percent less than when the road was privately owned. As a result, the number of vehicles using that particular section increased by 19 percent that year compared to the year before. It was estimated that the road would be fully paid off in 2042, and there were reports of decreased traffic on Chula Vista streets and an increase in retail business.

==== Proposal to remove tolls ====
In early 2022, Chula Vista mayor Mary Salas said that she hoped to end the toll by 2027 instead of 2042, wanting SANDAG to find a way to pay off the loans by then, stating that it is affecting the economically disadvantaged and driving away companies. In April, SANDAG officials reported that the regional body lost up to $1.8 million in revenue when the toll sensors were disabled between June and August 2021.

By July 2022, SANDAG officials announced that they will support eliminating tolls by 2027, but still have to explore ways to pay off the debt.

=== SR 11 / SR 905 interchange ===
Before being upgraded to a freeway between Britannia Boulevard and Siempre Viva Road, SR 905 directly connected with SR 125 via two at-grade intersections on Otay Mesa Road. When Caltrans opened that segment of the SR 905 freeway in 2010, they omitted the interchange with SR 125, forcing traffic on SR 905 and SR 125 to exit their respective freeways and use Otay Mesa Road (which SR 905 followed at that time) to make the connection. To help fix this problem, a direct freeway-to-freeway interchange was planned, which also included the new SR 11 freeway once it was to be constructed, with construction beginning in late 2015. SR 11 is planned to be a toll facility that will serve a new border crossing east of Otay Mesa. Ramps from SR 905 eastbound to SR 125 northbound, SR 905 westbound to SR 125 northbound, and SR 11 westbound to SR 125 northbound were completed on November 30, 2016, at the cost of over $21 million. Prior to December 16, 2021, traffic on southbound SR 125 was forced to exit onto Otay Mesa Road at that toll road's then southern terminus in order to connect to SR 11 and SR 905. Construction on the ramps for these connections began in 2018, with the ramps from SR 125 southbound to SR 11 eastbound and SR 125 southbound to SR 905 eastbound being completed on December 16, 2021, at the cost of $74 million. The ramp from SR 125 southbound to SR 905 westbound, which was still under construction at the time, was initially scheduled to open to traffic in 2023, but was instead opened to traffic on July 26, 2022, finally completing the interchange.

== Tolls ==
Tolls along the South Bay Expressway depend on whether a driver uses the FasTrak electronic toll collection device or pays by cash or credit card. It is the last remaining FasTrak facility offering cash payment. Those using FasTrak pass under open road tolling gantries at all exits and entrances and are charged a prorated toll based on the distance traveled, similar to a toll ticket system used on several turnpikes in the Eastern United States. Drivers paying with cash or credit cards are instead charged a more expensive flat rate depending on which toll booth they pass through, using a barrier toll system. Unstaffed toll plazas with automated cash and credit card machines are located at northbound and southbound off-ramps. Tolls are also collected at the mainline Otay Mesa Toll Plaza near the southern end of the facility just north of Otay Mesa Road. For example, any cash- or credit-paying driver who passes through the Otay Mesa Toll Plaza ends up paying the maximum rate of $3.50 regardless of the distance they traveled.

Drivers without FasTrak, credit cards, or exact change have within four business after using the toll road to make a one-time "Pay-by-Plate" payment online, plus a $2 processing fee, or they will be assessed an additional toll violation penalty.

The following table lists the toll rates for passenger cars, both with and without FasTrak (as of July 2020). The toll rate is doubled for vehicles with more than two axles.

Southern end of trip	Northern end of trip	FasTrak	Cash/Credit
Otay Mesa Road	SR 54	$2.75	$3.50
Otay Mesa Road	East H Street	$2.00	$3.50
Otay Mesa Road	Birch Road, Olympic Parkway, or Otay Lakes Road	$1.95	$3.50
Between Birch Road and East H Street		$0.50	$2.50
Birch Road, Olympic Parkway, Otay Lakes Road, or East H Street	SR 54	$1.70	$2.50
San Miguel Ranch Road	SR 54	$1.55	$2.00

== Exit list ==
The entire route is in San Diego County.

Location	mi	km	Exit	Destinations	Notes
Otay Mesa	0.00	0.00	–	SR 11	South end of SR 125; SR 11 west exit 1A
Otay Mesa	0.00	0.00	–	SR 905 east / Siempre Viva Road – International Border	Future I-905 east; SR 905 west exit 8
Otay Mesa	0.00	0.00	–	SR 905 west	Future I-905 west; SR 905 east exit 8
	1.06	1.71	1	Otay Mesa Road	Southbound exit and northbound entrance; former SR 905
San Diego	1.71	2.75	Otay Mesa Toll Plaza (FasTrak, cash or credit card)		
Chula Vista	4.87	7.84	5	Birch Road	FasTrak gantry, all ramps; unstaffed cash/credit card machines at southbound exit and northbound entrance
Chula Vista	5.65	9.09	6	Olympic Parkway	FasTrak gantry, all ramps; unstaffed cash/credit card machines at southbound exit and northbound entrance
Chula Vista	6.63	10.67	7	Otay Lakes Road	FasTrak gantry, all ramps; unstaffed cash/credit card machines at southbound exit and northbound entrance
Chula Vista	7.67	12.34	8	East H Street	FasTrak gantry, all ramps; unstaffed cash/credit card machines at southbound exit and northbound entrance
Chula Vista	8.64	13.90	9	San Miguel Ranch Road, Mt. Miguel Road	Southbound exit and northbound entrance (FasTrak, unstaffed cash/credit card machine)
			FasTrak toll gantry		
	11.74	18.89	11A	SR 54 west (South Bay Freeway)	SR 125 north follows exit 11B; SR 125 south follows SR 54 west exit 6; last free exit for southbound traffic
	12.39	19.94	12	Jamacha Boulevard, Paradise Valley Road (CR S17)	CR S17 is former SR 54 east
	13.11	21.10	13	Jamacha Road	
Lemon Grove	15.42– 15.98	24.82– 25.72	15	SR 94 (Martin Luther King Jr. Freeway)	Southbound exit to SR 94 east is via exit 16; SR 94 exits 9A-B
La Mesa	15.98	25.72	16	Spring Street – La Mesa	Northbound exit is via SR 94 east
La Mesa	16.84	27.10	16	Lemon Avenue	Northbound exit and southbound entrance
La Mesa	17.58	28.29	18A	Grossmont Boulevard	
La Mesa	17.90	28.81	18B	I-8	I-8 westbound exit 14B, eastbound exit 14A
La Mesa	18.31	29.47	18C	Fletcher Parkway	
El Cajon	19.63	31.59	20A	Navajo Road	
El Cajon	20.28	32.64	20B	Grossmont College Drive	
Santee	22.06	35.50	22	SR 52 – San Diego, Santee	North end of SR 125; former exit 21
Santee	22.30	35.89	–	Mission Gorge Road	At-grade intersection
1.000 mi = 1.609 km; 1.000 km = 0.621 mi: Incomplete access; Tolled
