= Cross Border Xpress =

Border crossing between Mexico and the U.S.

Cross Border Xpress (CBX)
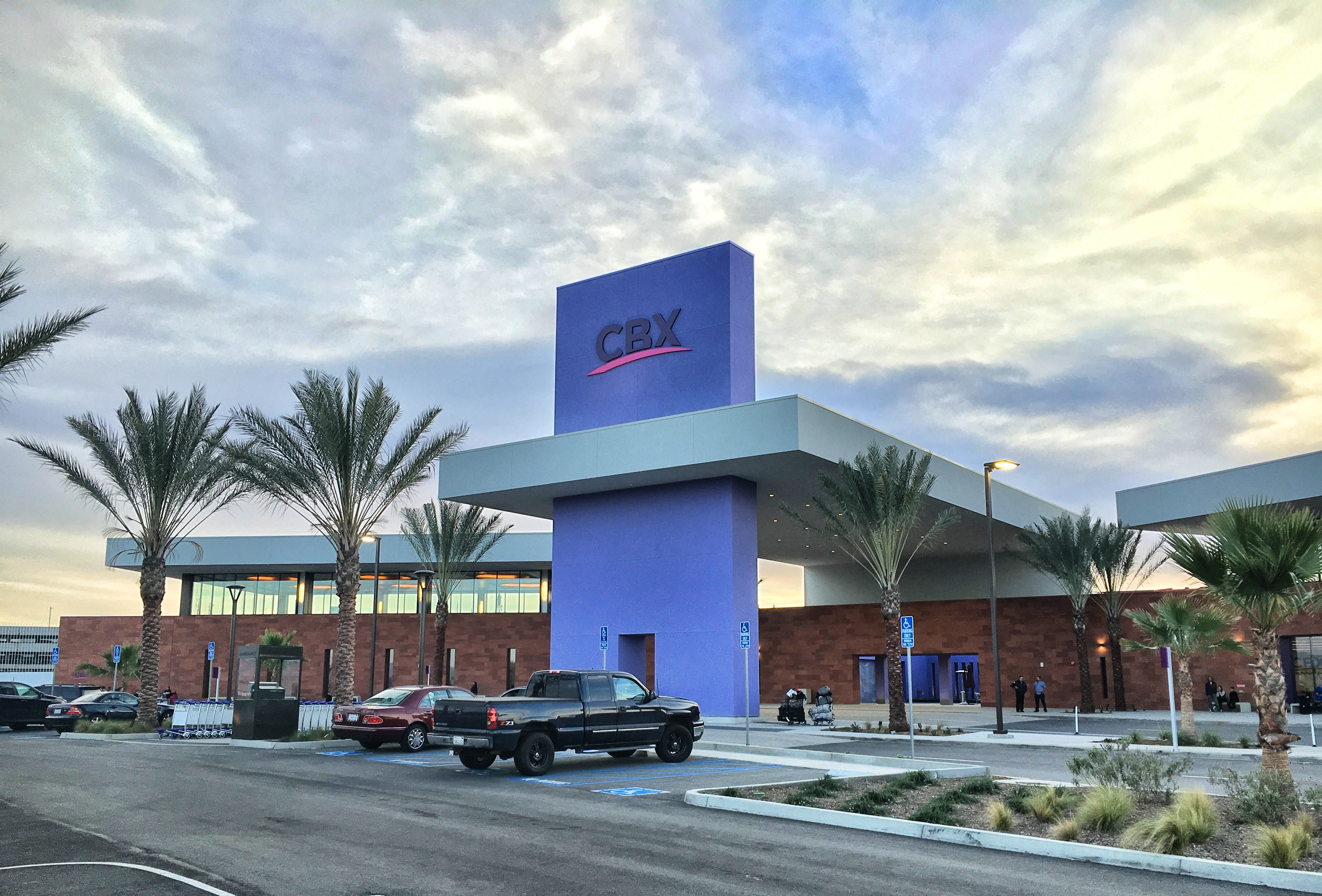
- Exterior of CBX terminal on the U.S. side

- Location within Tijuana

General information
- Type: Port of entry
- Architectural style: Postmodern
- Location: U.S.–Mexico border, 2745 Otay Pacific Drive, San Diego, CA 92173
- Coordinates: 32°32′54″N 116°58′28″W
- Construction started: June 2014
- Completed: December 2015
- Inaugurated: December 9, 2015
- Cost: $120 million
- Client: Bancomext and Invex
- Owner: Grupo Aeroportuario del Pacífico

Technical details
- Floor area: 65,000 sq ft (6,000 m^{2})

Design and construction
- Architects: Stantec, Ricardo Legorreta
- Architecture firm: Stantec, Legoretta + Legoretta, Delawie
- Other designers: Ralph Nieders
- Main contractor: Turner Construction, Hazard Construction (San Diego), Grumesa S.A. de C. V. (Mexico)

Website
- crossborderxpress.com

References
- Otay Tijuana Venture

The Cross Border Xpress (CBX), also known as the Puerta de las Californias (Spanish for "Gateway of the Californias"), is a border crossing and port of entry that connects San Diego in the United States and Tijuana International Airport in Mexico. Operational since December 2015, CBX consists of a terminal building located in the Otay Mesa community that is connected to the airport with a dedicated 120-meter (390 ft) pedestrian bridge that travels over the United States–Mexico border.

CBX eliminates the need for travelers to navigate traditional border crossings, potentially bypassing lengthy wait times. Departing passengers check-in for their flight on the U.S. side, cross the bridge, and proceed through Mexican customs and airport security. Conversely, arriving passengers clear U.S. customs and immigration upon reaching the Otay Mesa terminal before exiting on the U.S. side.

Conceptualized in 1989 by Ralph Nieders, CBX was managed by Otay-Tijuana Venture LLC, a consortium of U.S. and Mexican companies that included PAP, PALAREO, and EGI-OTAY Investors, with financing from Invex and Bancomext. In December 2025, Grupo Aeroportuario del Pacífico (GAP), the operator of Tijuana International Airport, acquired CBX from Otay-Tijuana Venture LLC for $2.2 billion. GAP stated that the acquisition would integrate the facility into its airport network and support future development on the U.S. side of the border.

== Facilities and operation ==
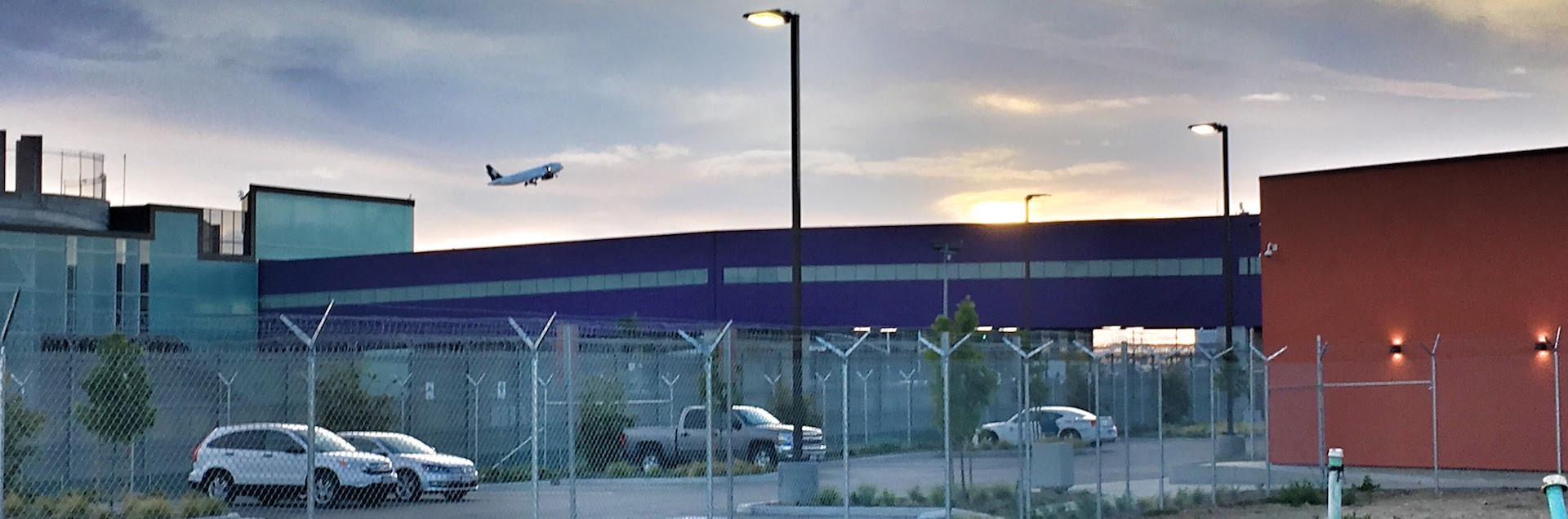
View of CBX bridge from parking lot on U.S. side, with Tijuana Airport on the left and the CBX U.S. terminal on the right

The CBX bridge can only be used by passengers with boarding passes for flights into or out of Tijuana International Airport. Departing passengers can access the bridge up to 24 hours before their flight, while arriving passengers have two hours after landing to cross into the U.S.

As of 2024, the fee to use the bridge varies by travel season, with one-way prices ranging from US$20 to 30. Discounts are available for families, military, commuters and those purchasing a round-trip.

On the U.S. side of the bridge is a terminal with ticket counters and kiosks for paying bridge access fees, a U.S. Customs and Border Protection facility to process passengers arriving from Mexico, car rental counters, taxi stands, shuttle bus services and 900 paid parking spaces.

On the Mexican side of the bridge, ticket counters and kiosks for paying bridge access fees are located within the Tijuana International Airport baggage claim area and Mexican immigration and customs facilities.

== History ==
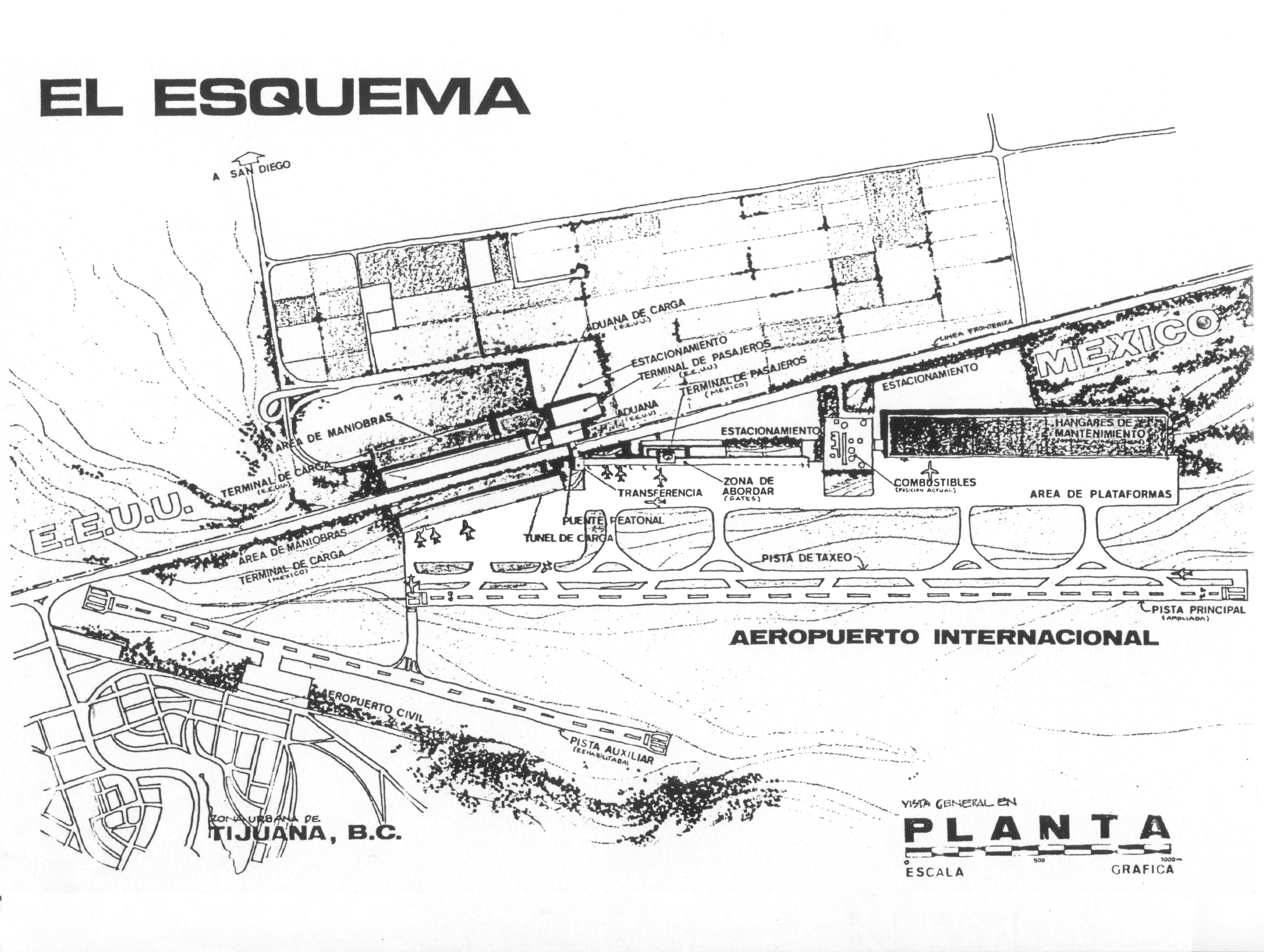
Image 1: Plans for a cross-border terminal date back to 1989. Here, one from Mexicana de Aviación and Ralph Nieders, 1990

The first discussion of a cross-border terminal was part of a proposal initiated by Mexico's Minister of Public Works (Secretario de Obras Publicas) Gilberto Valenzuela Ezquerro who under Mexico's President Gustavo Díaz Ordaz (1964–1970) was directed to modernize Mexico's airports and transportation system. In 1965, Gilberto Valenzuela approached then mayor of San Diego Frank Curran with a proposal to jointly develop a Tijuana-San Diego airport on Otay Mesa, but at the time, San Diego considered Otay Mesa too remote. Gilberto Valenzuela Ezquerro then initiated the development of the Tijuana airport which was expanded from 128 hectares (316 acres) to 448 hectares (1107 acres) to accommodate a new terminal and runway.

From 1965 until 1987, the concept of a cross-border terminal lay dormant until Dennis Conner America's Cup victory in Australia. Freddie Laker, who had pioneered low-fare commercial transatlantic routes and was the founder of Laker Airways, became interested in developing international commercial/charter flights through Mexico to service the projected passenger traffic for the America's Cup challenge in San Diego. He met with Rodolfo Ramos Ortiz, who had introduced charter operations in Mexico in the 1970s and founded Aerounión and Aerocharter de México, S.A. de C.V. Negotiations failed but the concept of a cross-border terminal continued to evolve.

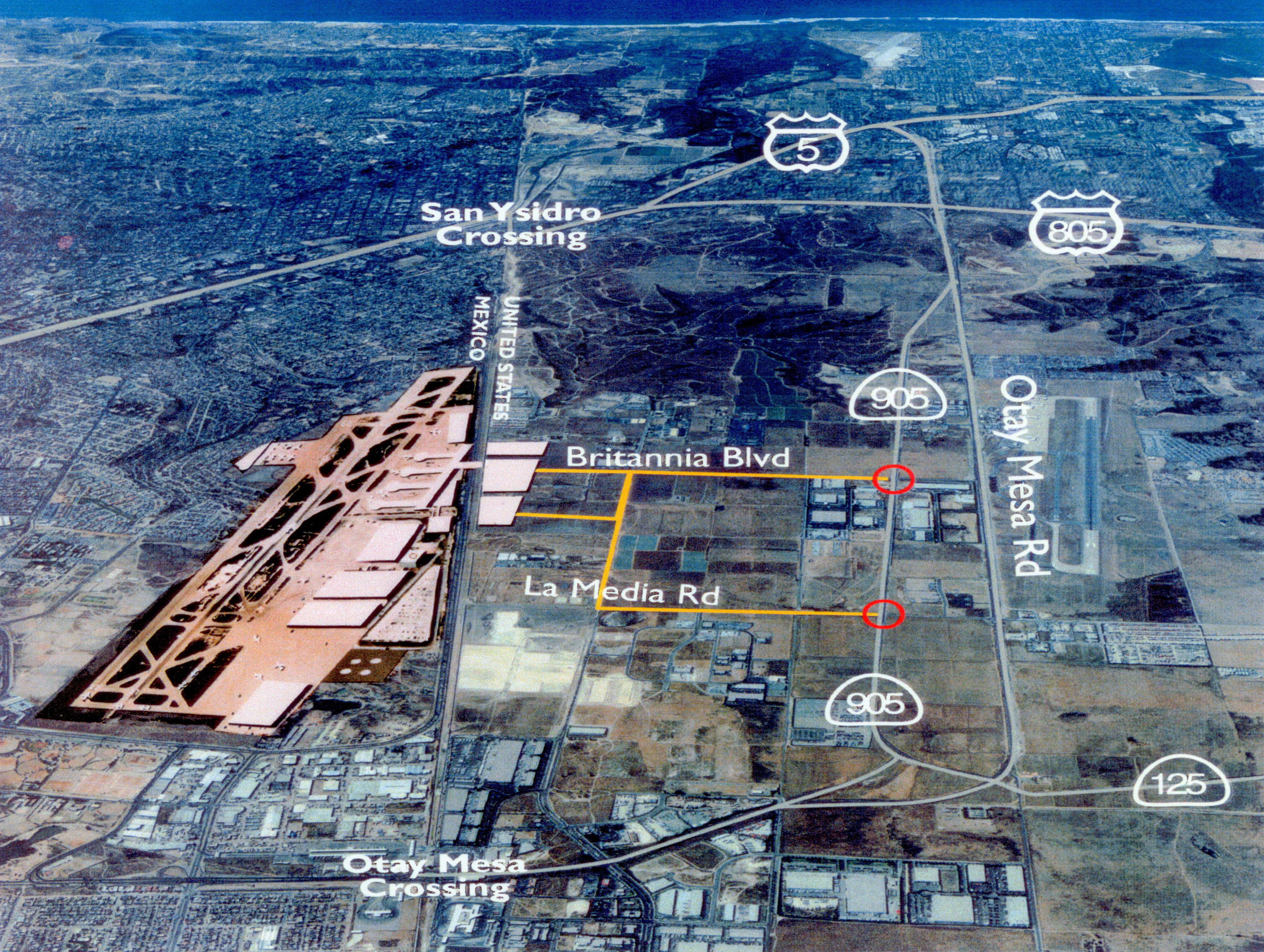
Image 2: Aerocharter-Nieders Tijuana cross-border terminal concept, 1991

In 1989, Ralph Nieders, who had been involved in the Freddie Laker discussions, made a formal proposal to Mexicana de Aviación, S.A. de C.V. in Mexico City. The proposal was accepted and a letter of intent drawn in 1990 for the acquisition of Martinez Ranch (parcel number APN 667-050-07) as the designated site for the cross-border terminal. The Mexicana de Aviación/Nieders image 1 shown in this section became the first of a series of plans/diagrams that were created to better promote the project. Contact was then made with the San Diego Association of Governments (SANDAG) whose plans for a "bi-national airport" had been undermined in November 1989, when the San Diego City Council lifted a building moratorium on Otay Mesa. SANDAG did not support the development of a cross-border terminal as it sought to again revive its efforts to create a bi-national airport on San Diego's Otay Mesa and Mexicana de Aviación opted not to pursue the project in January, 1991. As Mexicana de Aviación withdrew, in February 1991, Rodolfo Ramos Ortiz/Aerocharter de México looking at the Tijuana airport's potential for passenger and cargo operations to Japan and other Pacific destinations joined Ralph Nieders to continue promoting the cross-border terminal. As shown by image 2, an updated rendering was then created showing a fully developed Tijuana airport and how its cargo and passengers would directly connect to San Diego's surface streets and freeway system.

In 1993, San Diego's efforts to develop a regional bi-national airport failed and a recession during that same period also caused the collapse of land values in Otay Mesa. The selected site for the Aerocharter cross-border terminal on the U.S. side was foreclosed. Efforts to build the cross-border terminal were then suspended.

In 1994, Mexico initiated its airport privatization program and the cross-border terminal was refloated by Gilberto Valenzuela Ezquerro and Ralph Nieders. The Tijuana airport became part of the Pacific Airport Group, known as GAP (Grupo Aeroportuario del Pacífico) consisting of 12 airports with 15 Million Annual Passengers and headquartered in Guadalajara. In 1999, a Spanish consortium won the concession and committed to developing the cross-border terminal but in August 2001, in an effort to reduce operating costs, canceled the project and Ralph Nieders resigned as GAP's cross-border project manager. The Tijuana cross-border terminal project then reverted to Mexico's airport authority Aeropuertos y Servicios Auxiliares (ASA) and was privately promoted by Gilberto Valenzuela and Ralph Nieders.

In 2006, Controladora Mexicana de Aeropuertos S.A. de C.V. replaced Holdinmex S.A. de C.V. as the Mexican strategic partner within AMP (Aeropuertos Mexicanos del Pacifico, S.A. de C.V.) and assumed control of the Pacific Airport Group (GAP).

After a quarter century of negotiations and planning for a cross-border terminal, construction began at the Tijuana airport in October 2013 and work on the U.S. side began in June 2014. The cross-border terminal was completed in December 2015. The project had an initial estimated cost of $78 million US dollars and a final completion cost of $120 million US dollars, funded by Mexican and U.S. private investors and Grupo Aeroportuario del Pacífico. Building E of Tijuana's Terminal 1 was retrofitted to support the new bridge structure on the Mexican side. During the construction phase, a temporary border waiver between the U.S. and Mexico had to be issued by mutual legislation to allow U.S. construction cranes and U.S. fabricated steel bridge structural sections to cross the U.S.-Mexico boundary and be set over the six-lane Mexican Federal Highway 2.

The main contractor for the terminal was Turner Construction Company. The civil engineer was Latitude 33 Planning and Engineering. Structural engineers were Hope Amundson Structural Engineers and Kleinfelder. The electrical subcontractor was Bergelectric. The mechanical and plumbing subcontractor was Industrial Commercial Systems. The site work and management subcontractor was Hazard Construction Company. Stantec Incorporated based in Alberta, Canada, was selected as the prime architect and facility designer with the late Ricardo Legorreta of Legorreta+Legorreta as the associate architect.

The Tijuana cross-border terminal was renamed the Cross Border Xpress (CBX) and opened to passenger service on December 9, 2015. However, the official opening ceremony did not take place until April 7, 2016. Within seven months of the facility's opening, 600,000 passengers had used the facility, with a single day record of 5,800 passengers.

For its design and innovation in the category of Airport and Ports, in April 2016 Engineering News-Report (ENR) gave the Otay-Tijuana Cross Border Xpress (CBX) its Global Award For Merit. and in September 2016, awarded CBX the Airports/Transit Best Project in California.

In 2020, an additional restroom facility was added to the building and the duty-free area underwent a renovation completed by Delawie Architects and Turner Construction Company.

== Gallery ==
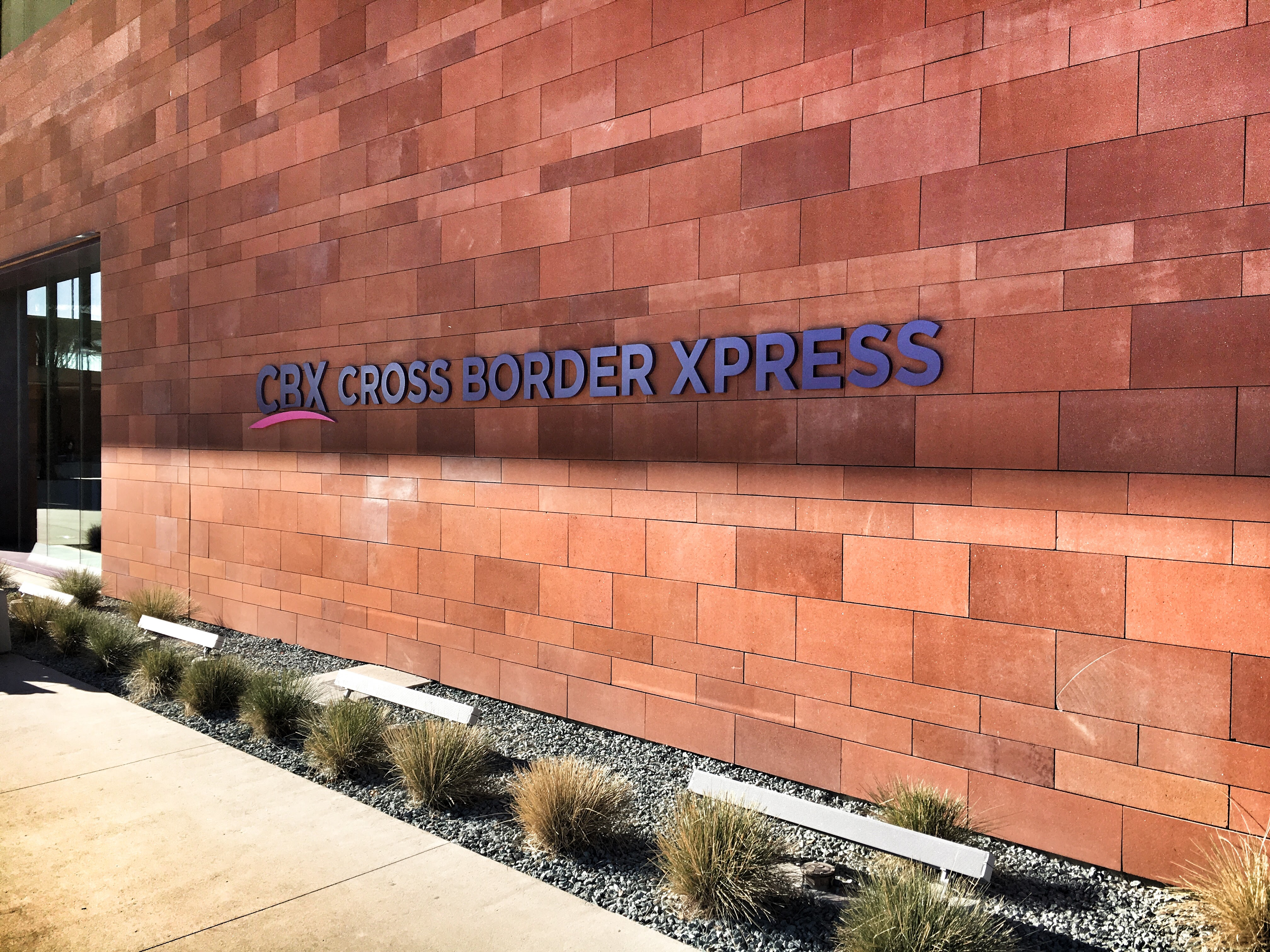
CBX building sign

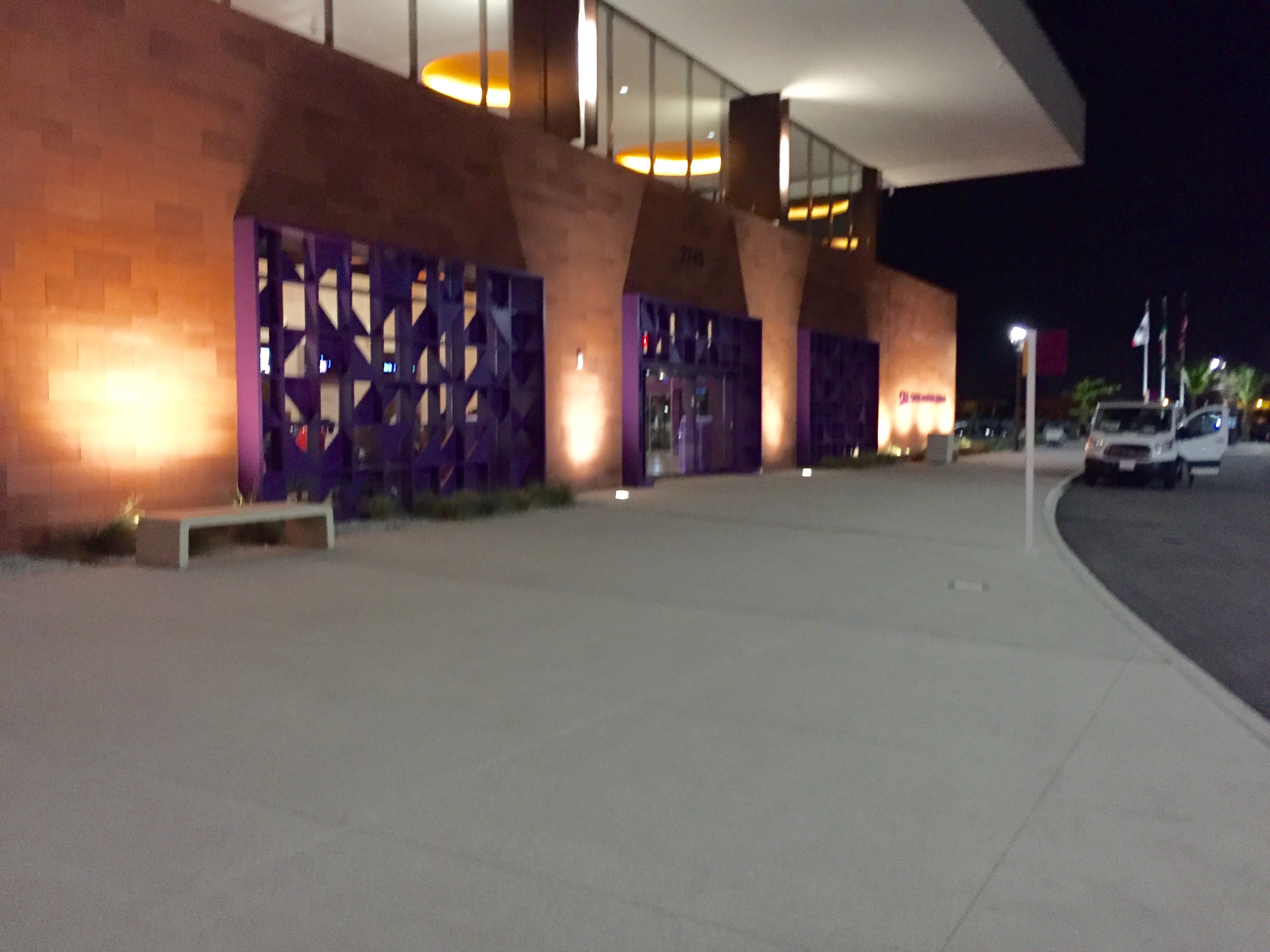
CBX terminal entrance

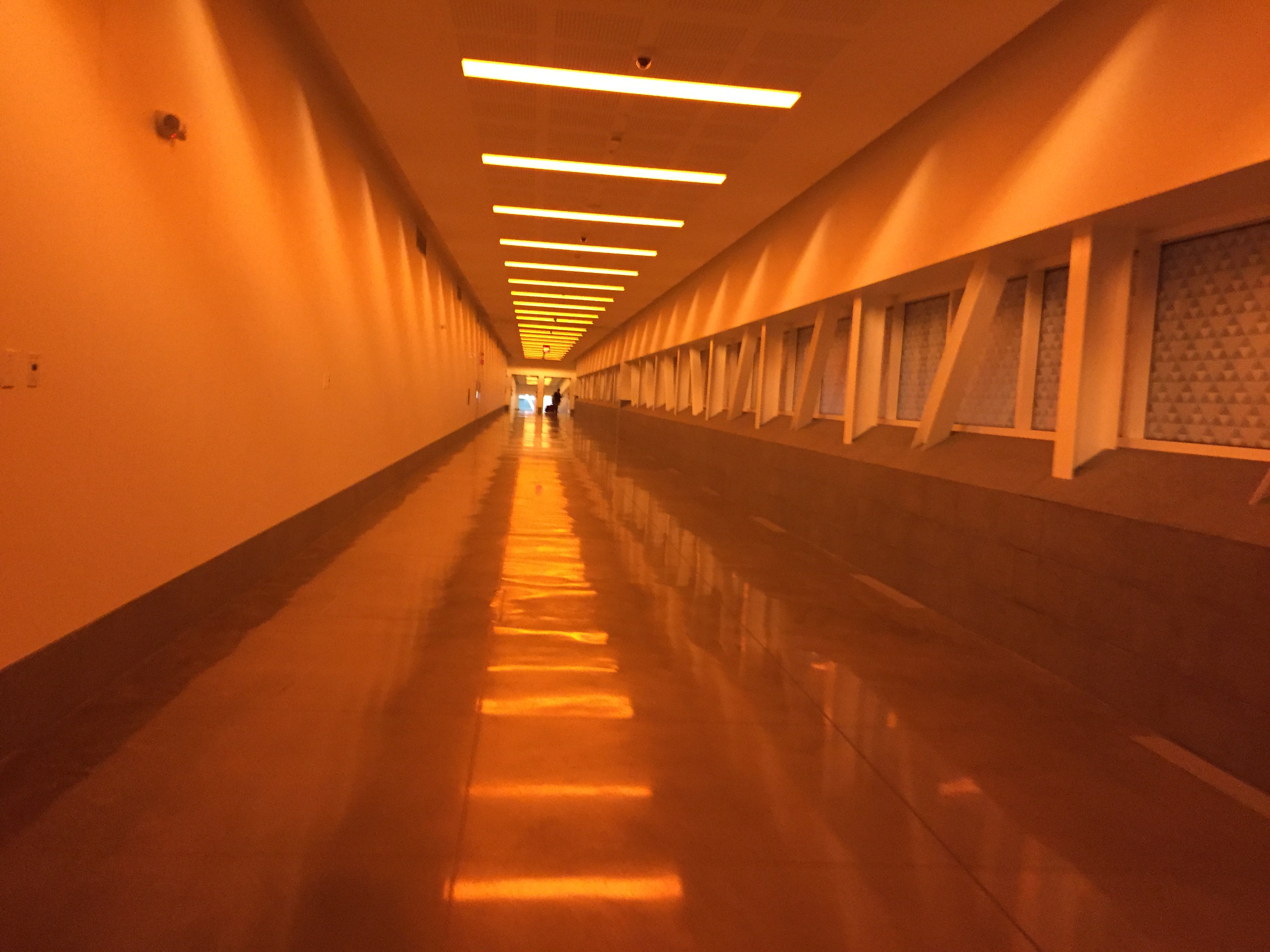
CBX passenger bridge corridor U.S.-Mexico

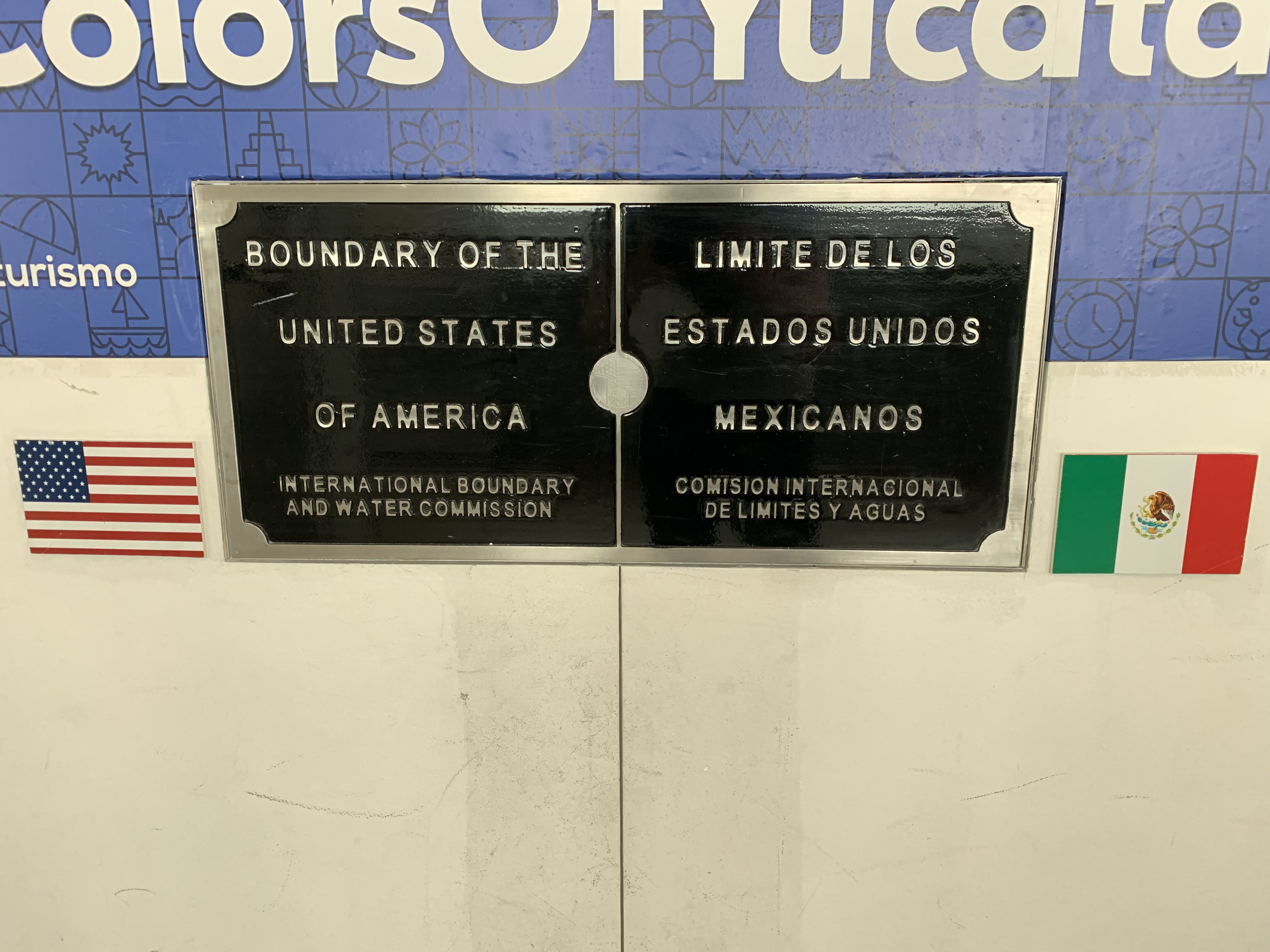
Plaque at the CBX passenger bridge corridor indicating the Mexico–United States border.

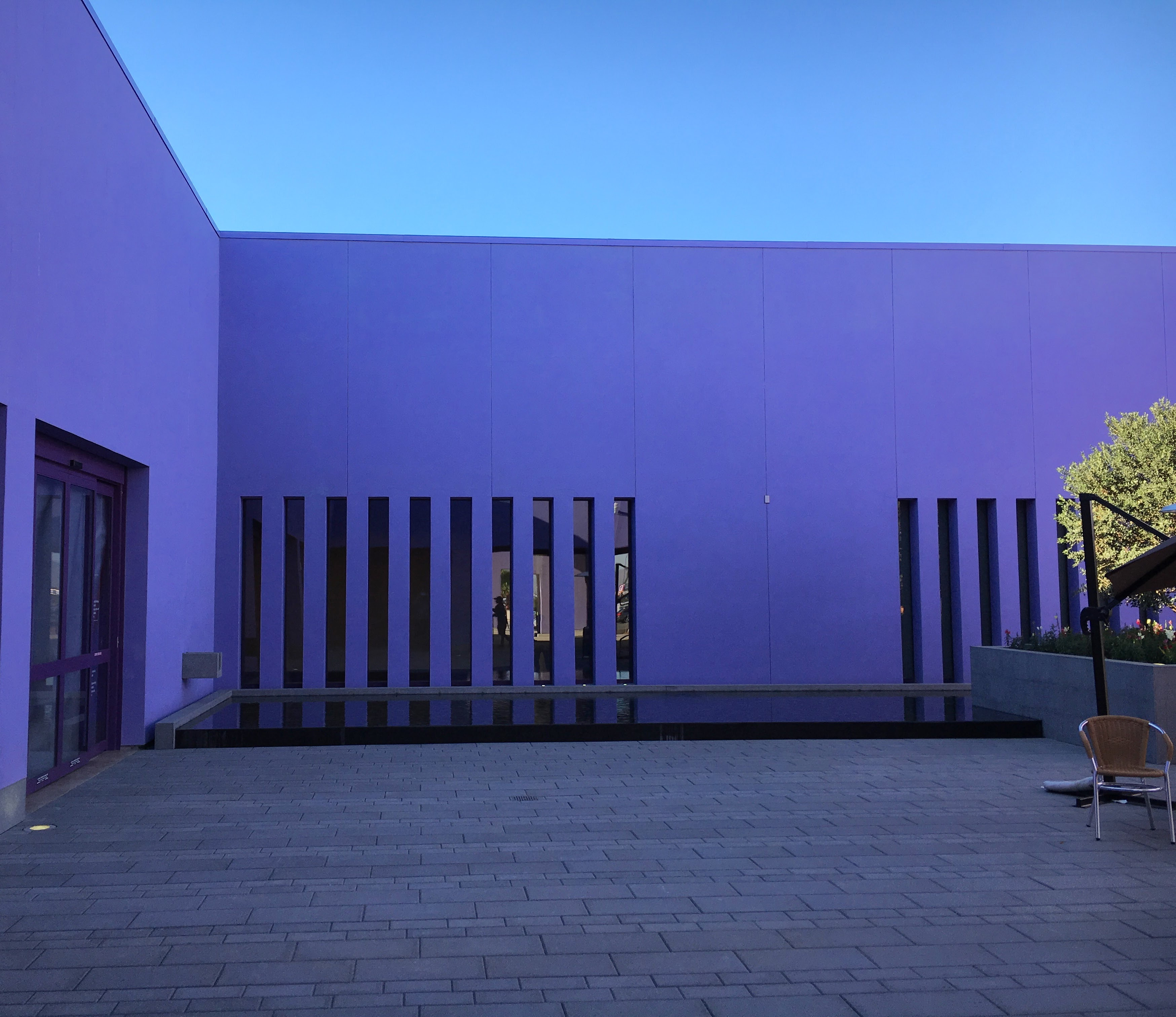
CBX patio

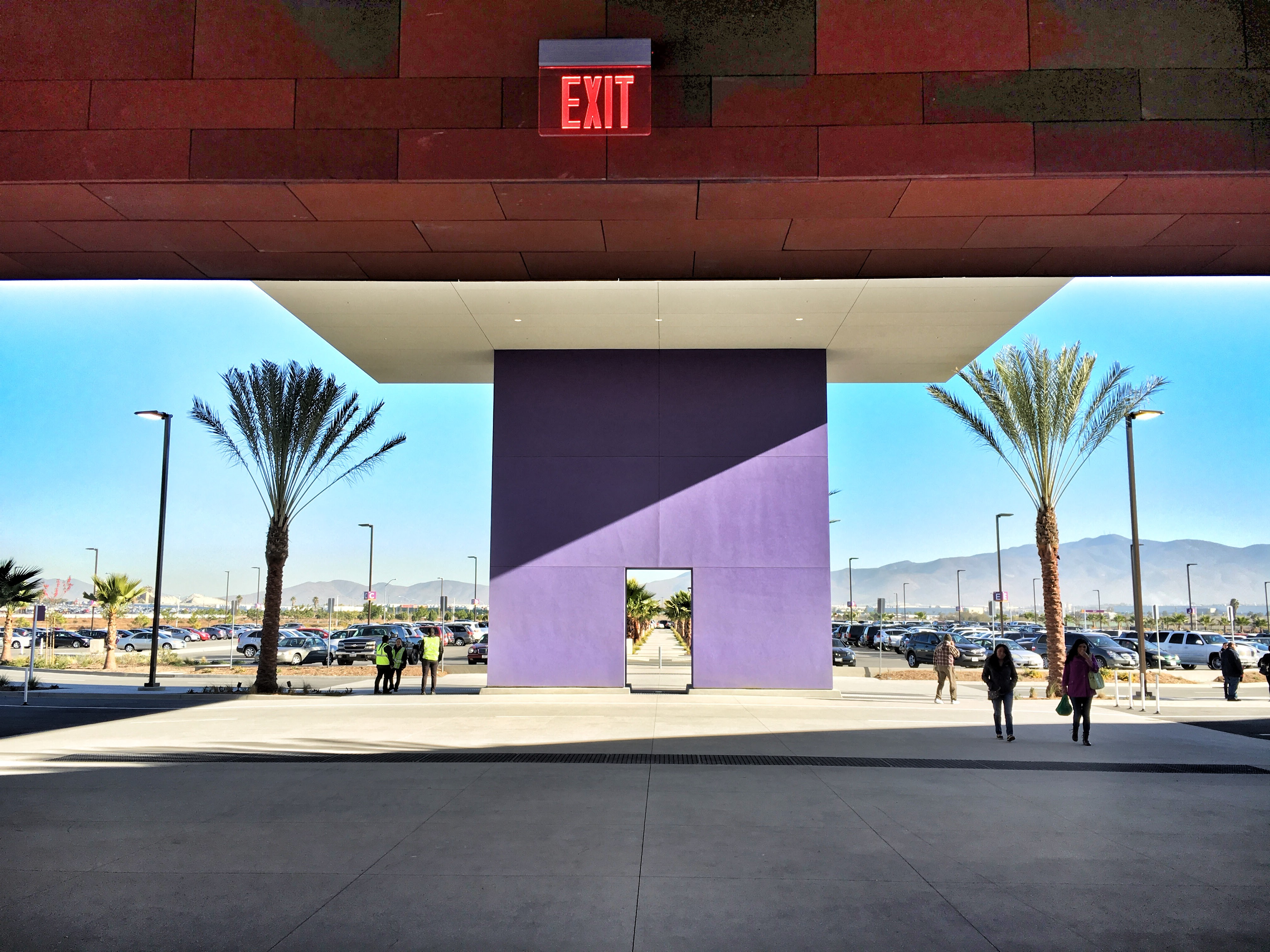
CBX exit from terminal to parking lot

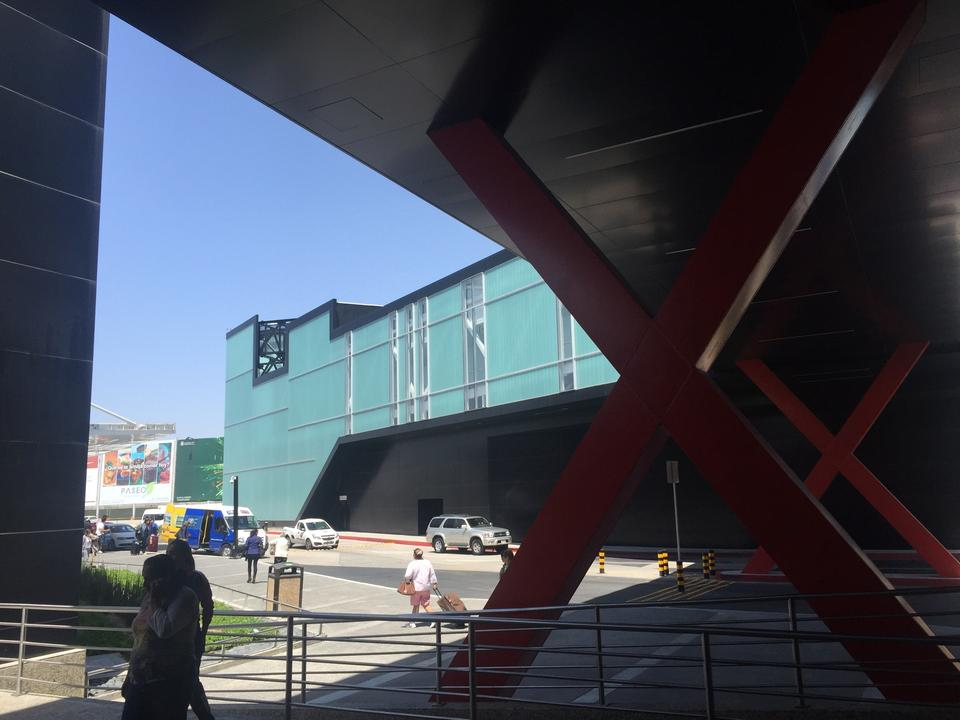
Tijuana airport CBX bridge

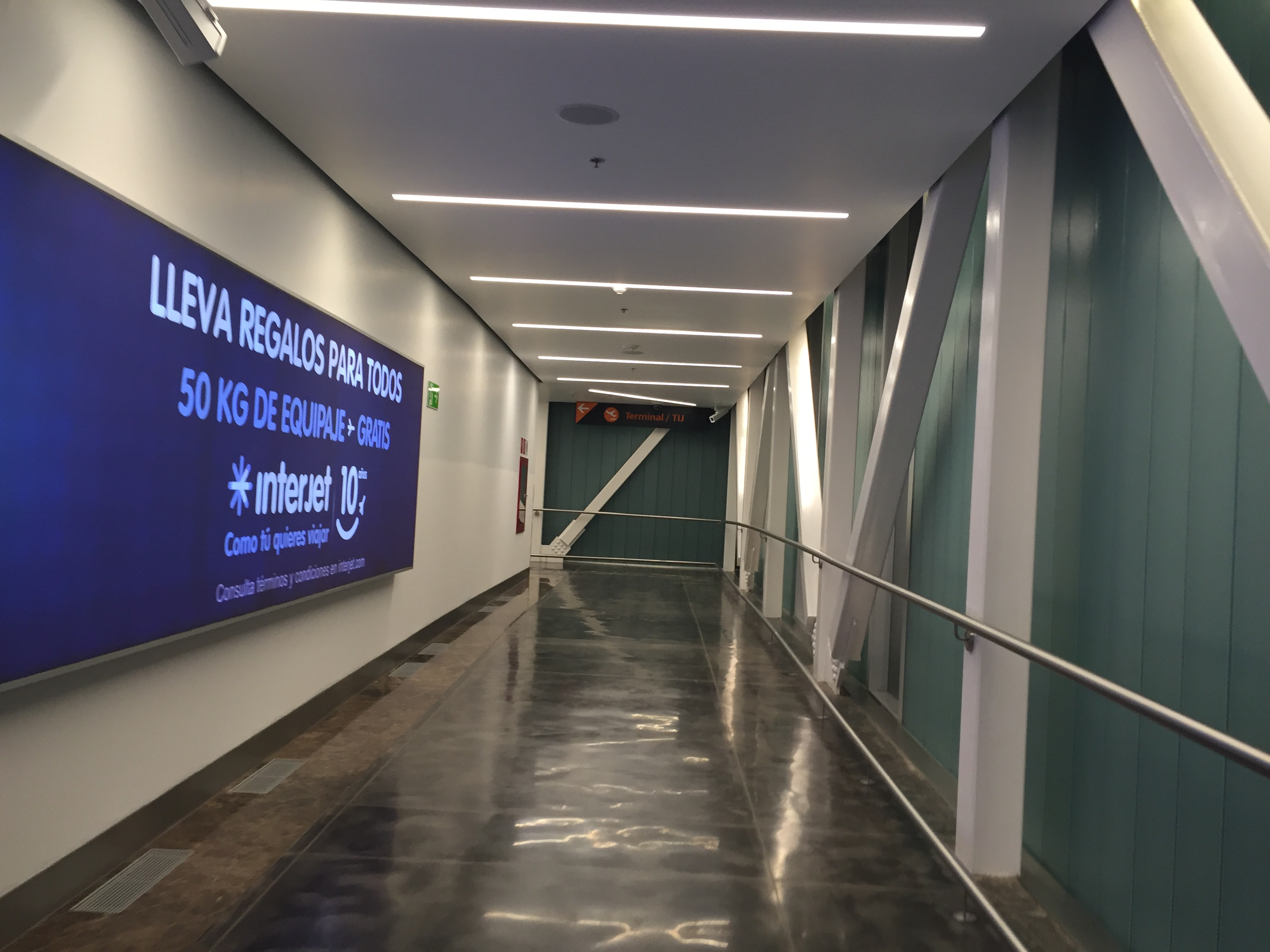
Tijuana airport CBX passenger bridge

== See also ==
- History of the Cross Border Xpress
