= Brown Field Municipal Airport =

- IATA: SDM; ICAO: KSDM; FAA LID: SDM

Summary
- Airport type: Public
- Operator: City of San Diego
- Serves: San Diego, California
- Elevation AMSL: 526 ft (160 m)
- Coordinates: 32°34′20″N 116°58′49″W
- Website: www.sandiego.gov

Map
- FAA airport diagram

Runways
Direction	Length		Surface
Direction	ft	m	Surface
08L/26R	7,972	2,430	Asphalt/concrete
08R/26L	3,180	969	Asphalt

Brown Field Municipal Airport (IATA: SDM, ICAO: KSDM, FAA LID: SDM) is in the Otay Mesa neighborhood of San Diego, California, United States, 13 miles (21 km) southeast of downtown San Diego and named in honor of Commander Melville S. Brown, USN, who was killed in an airplane crash in 1936. Its main runway is 7,972 feet (2,430 m) long. Its FAA/IATA airport code is SDM. Formerly Naval Auxiliary Air Station Brown Field, it is now a civilian reliever airport and a port of entry from Mexico. It is sometimes staffed by U.S. Customs and Border Protection, but only upon request of incoming pilots to the Federal Aviation Administration. The development plans for the SDM airport have been announced on 4th Oct 2022, the development will occur in phases over 20 years. The plans include a new FBO terminal building and individual airplane hangars. There is also talk of adding a million square feet of retail and industrial buildings and possibly a hotel. Brown Field is also home to Chapter 14 of the Experimental Aircraft Association, and regularly hosts free Young Eagles events to introduce children to aviation.

== History ==
Brown Field is 1.5 miles north of the US/Mexico border in the Otay Mesa Community of the City of San Diego. The airport, originally named East Field in honor of Army Major Whitten J. East, opened in 1918 when the U.S. Army established an aerial gunnery and aerobatics school to relieve congestion at North Island. Major East completed flight training at the Army Signal Corps Station, Rockwell Field on North Island before flying over the front lines in France during World War I. He was killed in an auto accident in 1918 while in command of Mitchel Field in New York at the age of 25. From 1918 to 1919, pilots flying the Curtiss JN-4D Jenny trained at East Field. After World War I the military maintained control of East Field for touch and go landings and radio controlled target drone experiments.

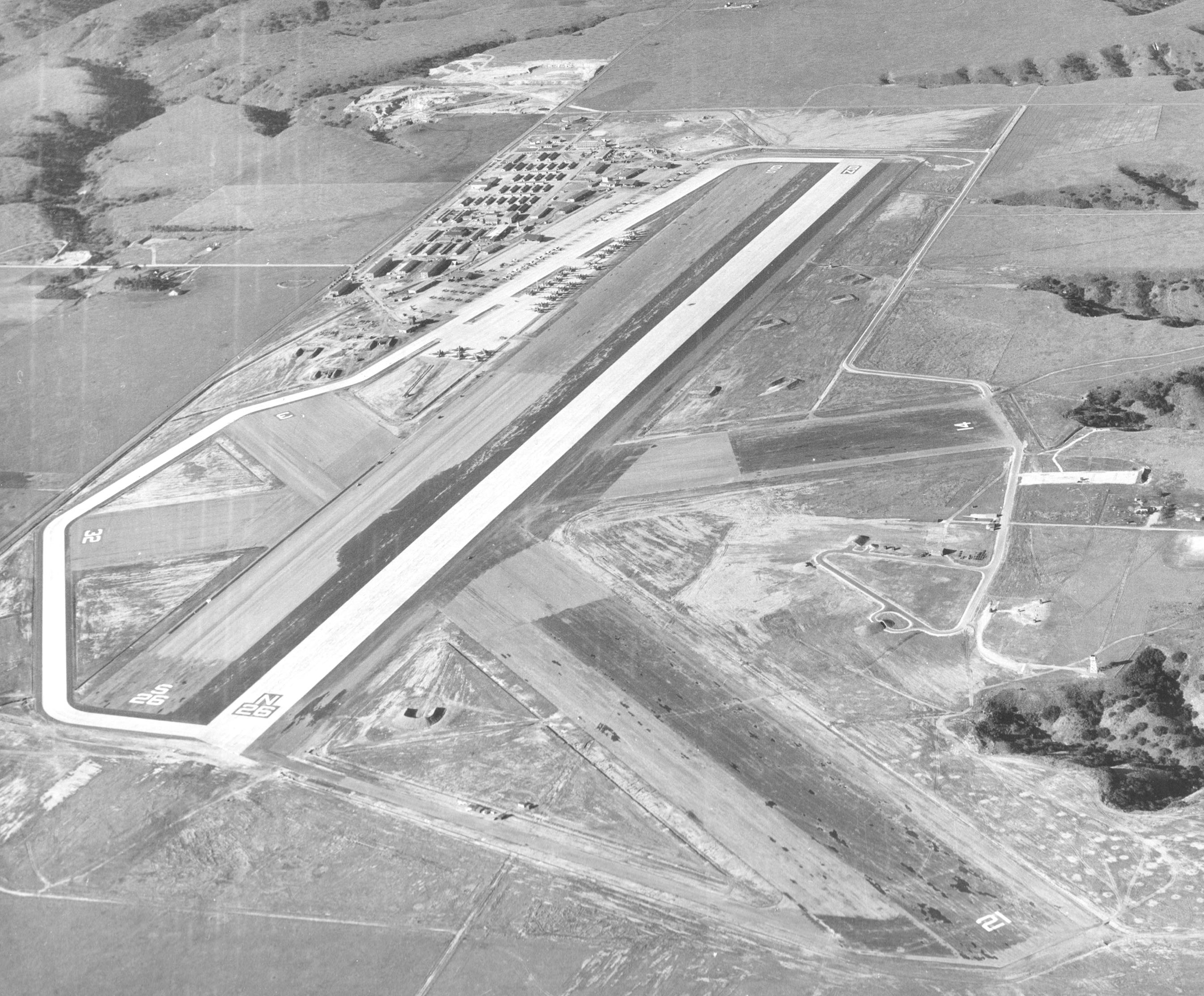
NAAS Brown Field on December 3rd 1944

In 1943, the U.S. Navy took over the airfield and changed the name to NAAS Otay Mesa; later that year the name was changed again to NAAS Brown Field in honor of Commander Melville S. Brown, USN, who was killed in the crash of F2F-1, BuNo 9660 near Descanso, CA on 2 November 1936. CDR Brown was the Commanding Officer of the USS Truxtun (DD-229) when the ship was commissioned in 1921, and was Executive Officer of the aircraft carrier USS Lexington (CV-2) at the time of his death. Between 1943 and 1946, the U.S. Army Air Forces, the U.S. Navy and the U.S. Marine Corps used NAAS Brown Field for training in various aircraft, including the USAAF Lockheed P-38 Lightning, and the USN and USMC Grumman F4F Wildcat/General Motors FM-1 Wildcat, Grumman TBF/TBM Avenger, Grumman F6F Hellcat, and Consolidated PB4Y-2 Privateer.

In 1946, the Navy decommissioned NAAS Brown Field and turned it over to San Diego County. The county ended up renting portions of the former base for use as a chicken farm and Chula Vista High School was established on the airport property in 1946.

In 1951, the Navy reopened the airfield as NALF Brown Field, a naval auxiliary landing field, due to increased military activity stemming from the Korean War and the Cold War. In 1954, Brown Field was again commissioned and redesignated as a Naval Auxiliary Air Station, with facilities to support regular operations of Fleet aircraft, assigned missile programs, and field carrier landing practice. In 1955, NAAS Brown Field was home to one utility squadron (VU), two air antisubmarine warfare squadrons (VS), a fleet aircraft service squadron (FASRON), and a Regulus air missile unit. The following year, the base was home to two utility squadrons, VU-3 and VU-7, the headquarters for Commander, Utility Wing Pacific (COMUTWINGPAC), a FASRON 4 detachment, and a ground control approach unit. Aircraft that operated at NAAS Brown Field included the F6F Hellcat, F9F Cougar, SNB, R4D Skytrain, JD-1 Invader, P2V Neptune, and FJ Fury. On November 2, 1954, the Convair XFY-1 Pogo made a transitional flight from vertical takeoff to horizontal flight, then back to a vertical landing at NAAS Brown Field. In 1957, NAAS Brown Field was selected as a site for one of the Vanguard Earth Satellite Tracking Stations.

On September 1, 1962, the Navy decommissioned NAAS Brown Field again and transferred ownership of Brown Field to the City of San Diego with the condition that it remain a public airport. During the mid to late 1960s, Pacific Southwest Airlines, an airline based in San Diego, trained its pilots at Brown Field using Piper Arrows, Comanches, Aztecs, and Beechcraft Bonanzas. PSA also had a contract to train Lufthansa pilots at Brown Field. In 1970, Lufthansa training moved to Phoenix, Arizona, where it remains today.

Brown field is regularly visited by a Boeing 727 of IFL Group and other large private jets, mainly for customs, along with C-130s and F/A-18s of the USN and USMC, mainly due to the relatively long runway.

=== Scheduled service ===
From 1964 to 1971, Brown Field received weekend-only scheduled service from Burbank by intrastate airline Mercer Airlines.

== Neighboring facilities ==
Tijuana Airport, a commercial airport, is just over 1 mi (1.6 km) to the south across the Mexico–United States border, with a similar length and a slightly different runway orientation (09 / 27).

== Terrain ==
A precision approach is not possible to either runway end due to rising terrain (elevation 3,600 feet) less than six miles (10 km) east of the airport. There have been several crashes due to pilots not maintaining sufficient altitude over these mountains (often flying VFR at night).

== Climate ==
The area around Brown Field Municipal Airport has a warm-summer Mediterranean climate (Csb) with warm summers and cool winters.

Climate data for Brown Field Municipal Airport, California (normals 1981-2010, 1945-2020 extremes)
Month	Jan	Feb	Mar	Apr	May	Jun	Jul	Aug	Sep	Oct	Nov	Dec	Year
Record high °F (°C)	90 (32)	93 (34)	97 (36)	97 (36)	101 (38)	97 (36)	102 (39)	102 (39)	108 (42)	103 (39)	99 (37)	87 (31)	108 (42)
Mean daily maximum °F (°C)	65.9 (18.8)	65.7 (18.7)	67.0 (19.4)	68.9 (20.5)	71.6 (22.0)	73.9 (23.3)	77.8 (25.4)	79.9 (26.6)	79.3 (26.3)	75.5 (24.2)	70.9 (21.6)	66.3 (19.1)	71.9 (22.2)
Daily mean °F (°C)	54.9 (12.7)	55.6 (13.1)	56.7 (13.7)	59.2 (15.1)	62.8 (17.1)	65.4 (18.6)	69.0 (20.6)	70.9 (21.6)	69.7 (20.9)	65.3 (18.5)	58.7 (14.8)	54.8 (12.7)	61.9 (16.6)
Mean daily minimum °F (°C)	43.8 (6.6)	45.6 (7.6)	46.4 (8.0)	49.5 (9.7)	54.0 (12.2)	56.9 (13.8)	60.3 (15.7)	61.9 (16.6)	60.2 (15.7)	55.0 (12.8)	46.5 (8.1)	43.3 (6.3)	51.9 (11.1)
Record low °F (°C)	27 (−3)	30 (−1)	34 (1)	34 (1)	41 (5)	44 (7)	50 (10)	52 (11)	48 (9)	38 (3)	32 (0)	29 (−2)	27 (−3)
Average precipitation inches (mm)	2.48 (63)	2.16 (55)	2.45 (62)	0.94 (24)	0.21 (5.3)	0.15 (3.8)	0.09 (2.3)	0.10 (2.5)	0.23 (5.8)	0.49 (12)	1.15 (29)	1.92 (49)	12.37 (314)
Source: NOAA

== Incidents and accidents ==
On March 16, 1991, seven members of Reba McEntire's band and her road manager were among 10 people who died in the crash of a plane that departed from Brown Field. The aircraft hit Otay Mountain northeast of the airport.

On August 16, 2015, five people were killed when a twin-engine North American Sabreliner jet and a single-engine Cessna 172 Skyhawk collided midair about two miles northeast of Brown Field. The Cessna's pilot was performing touch-and-go-landings when the aircraft clipped wings above Otay Mesa, located just north of the U.S.-Mexico border. Both planes caught fire when they hit the ground and broke apart. Pieces of the fiery wreckage fell about a quarter-mile from each other and sparked fires in the remote, brushy area, east of state Route 125. The Sabreliner was carrying four people and was registered to military contractor BAE Systems, whose employees were aboard the aircraft. The pilot of the Cessna was on a cross-country trip.

== See also ==
- Air/Space America 88
