= Otay Mesa East Port of Entry =

Proposed border crossing between Mexico and the U.S.

Location
- Country: United States
- Location: San Diego, California
- Coordinates: 32.5530°N 116.9058°W

The Otay Mesa East Port of Entry is a planned border crossing between San Diego and Tijuana, approximately two miles east of the existing Otay Mesa Port of Entry. The crossing will connect the Otay Centenario borough of Tijuana with East Otay Mesa in unincorporated San Diego County, an as-yet undeveloped area slotted for future development including a business park. Although the crossing will allow cars and pedestrians, it is mainly designed for trucks and commercial vehicles.

In July 2014, Mexican Undersecretary of Infrastructure of the Secretariat of Communications and Transportation Raúl Murrieta Cummings and the Secretary of the California Department of Transportation (Caltrans), Brian P. Kelly, signed a memorandum of understanding to build and put the new port of entry into operation. It was expected to be ready as early as 2017, and provide 27 northbound lanes from Tijuana to San Diego and 8 southbound lanes. The cost is estimated to be 2 billion Mexican pesos (about 99 million US dollars).

Construction began at the initial ground breaking in August 2022, after long delays. Although earlier estimates suggested the project would be completed by late 2024, more recent estimates suggest construction may not be complete until 2026. As of 2024, it is expected to open in 2028, with tolls to help fund the project.

== See also ==
- List of Mexico–United States border crossings
