= Otay Mesa Port of Entry =

Border crossing between Mexico and the U.S.

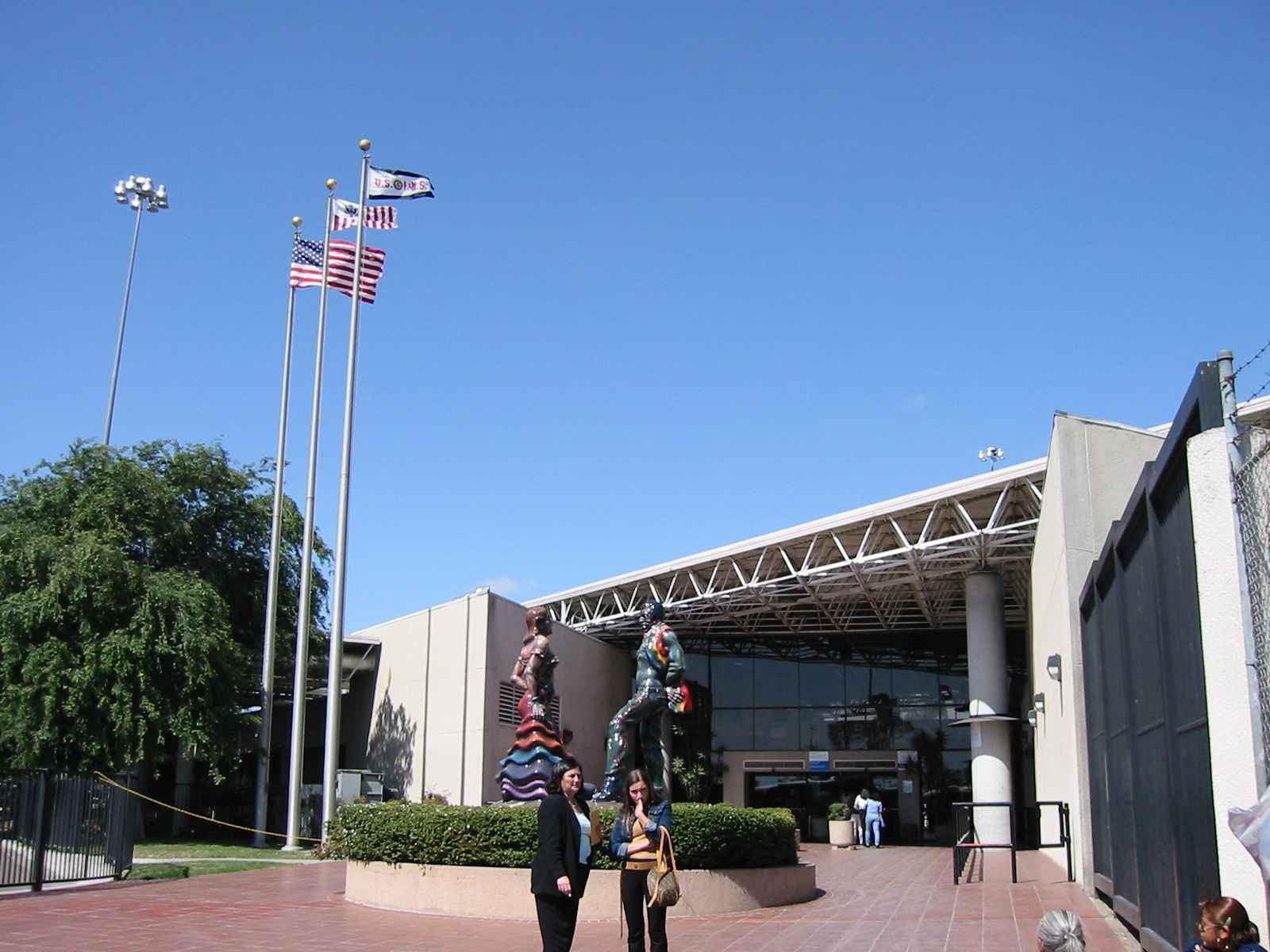
- Otay Mesa Border Inspection Station

Location
- Country: United States
- Location: 9777 Via De La Amistad, San Diego, California 92154 U.S.
- Coordinates: 32.550602°N 116.938187°W

Details
- Opened: 1983

Statistics
- Passenger traffic: 14,950,766
- Individuals (2019): 14,950,766
- Personal Vehicles (2019): 6,584,442
- Pedestrians (2019): 3,567,271

Website
- https://www.bts.gov/browse-statistical-products-and-data/border-crossing-data/border-crossingentry-data

The Otay Mesa Port of Entry (Spanish: Puerto de Entrada Mesa de Otay) is one of three ports of entry (POE) in the San Diego–Tijuana metropolitan region, in the U.S. state of California, connecting Otay Mesa in San Diego with the Otay Centenario borough of Tijuana. The facility was opened in 1983, and was constructed primarily to divert growing commercial truck traffic from the busy San Ysidro Port of Entry, located 5.2 miles (8.4 km) west. Since then, significant passenger vehicle and pedestrian traffic has grown as development in the area around the crossing has grown. Commercial importations through Otay Mesa accounts for billions of dollars' worth of freight.

The Otay Mesa Port of Entry is accessed by California State Route 905 on the northern side. Since commercial traffic cannot use the San Ysidro Port of Entry, for commercial traffic Otay Mesa is the southern terminus of the Interstate 5 corridor.

The port of entry is the third-busiest commercial port of entry on the Mexico–United States border. To reduce wait times a facility built by the Mexican federal government, staffed by United States Customs and Border Protection officers and Mexican customs officers, will be opened on the Mexican side of the border. It will be used to screen produce, which are considered low-risk commodities. A similar facility will be located at the Laredo International Airport, where Mexican customs officers will pre-inspect air shipments into Mexico.

== See also ==
- List of Mexico–United States border crossings
- Pacific Highway Border Crossing, the northern equivalent terminus of I-5 for commercial traffic
