= Hudspeth County Courthouse =

- U.S. National Register of Historic Places
- Texas State Antiquities Landmark
- Recorded Texas Historic Landmark
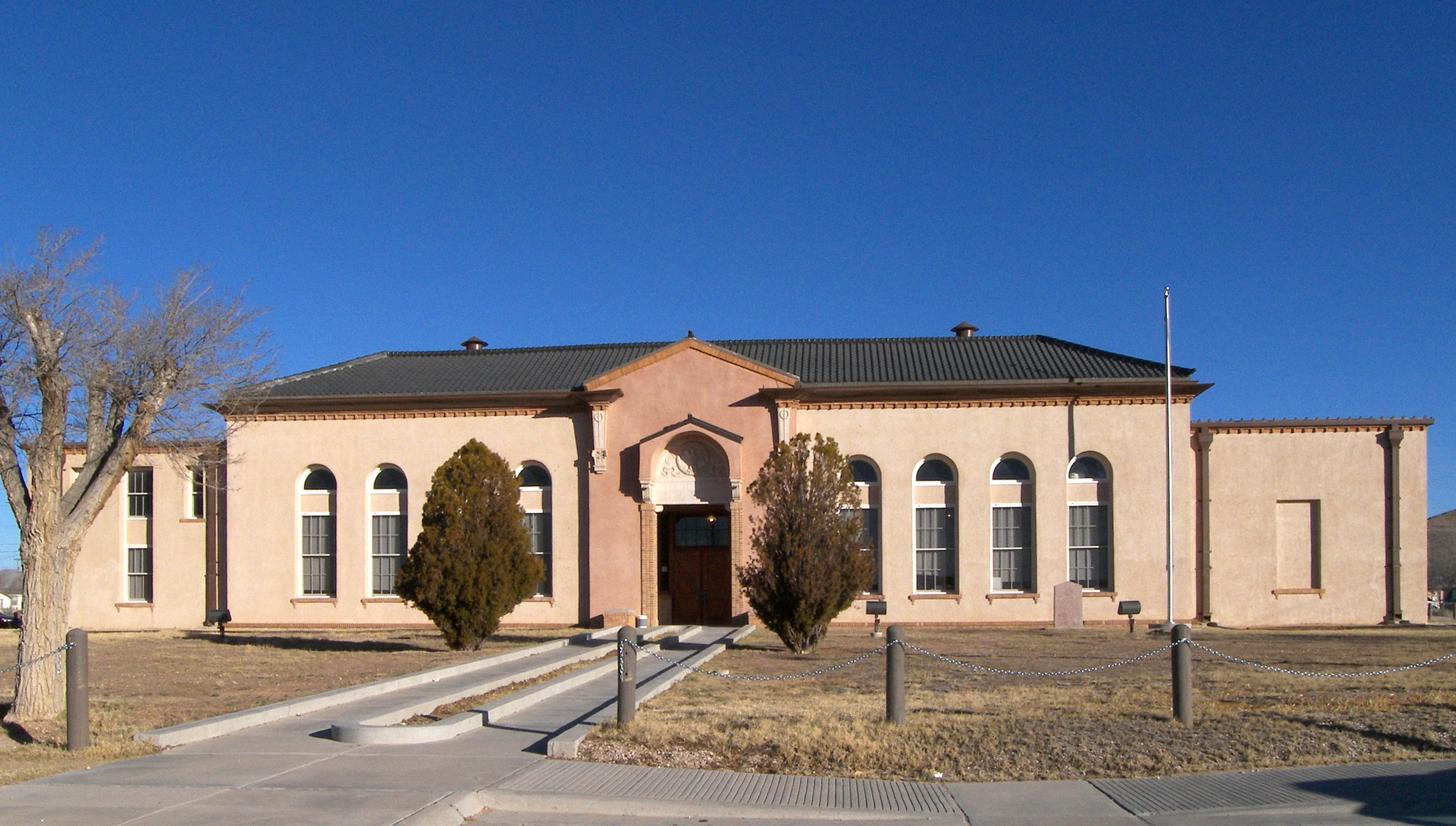
- Hudspeth County Courthouse

- Location within Texas Location within the United States
- Interactive map showing the location of Hudspeth County Courthouse
- Location: 201 W. Millican St., Sierra Blanca, Texas
- Coordinates: 31°10′47″N 105°21′25″W
- Area: 1 acre (0.40 ha)
- Built: 1919
- Architect: Bradford Hardie of Beutell & Hardie, El Paso
- Architectural style: Spanish Eclectic, Mediterranean Classic Revival
- Website: www.hudspethcountytexas.us
- NRHP reference No.: 75001993
- TSAL No.: 8200000373
- RTHL No.: 2591

Significant dates
- Added to NRHP: May 21, 1975
- Designated TSAL: May 28, 1981
- Designated RTHL: August 1962

The Hudspeth County Courthouse is located in the town of Sierra Blanca, the seat of Hudspeth County in the U.S. state of Texas. The courthouse was constructed in 1919 and added to the National Register of Historic Places in 1975. The Texas Historical Commission (THC) has also designated the building as a Recorded Texas Historic Landmark since 1962 and as a State Antiquities Landmark since 1981. The county is named for Claude Benton Hudspeth who served as a U.S. representative from El Paso and previously in both houses of the Texas Legislature where, as a member of the Texas Senate, he was influential in the county's creation.

The courthouse is located in Sierra Blanca's central commercial district and holds the distinction of being the only remaining Texas courthouse of adobe construction. The one-story building features a mixture of Spanish Eclectic and Mediterranean Classic Revival architecture.

The courthouse has received renovations over the years supported by federal and THC funding, and has served as a meeting place for local clubs and organizations.

== Description ==
The courthouse is situated in central Sierra Blanca in the center of a block bounded by West Brown Street to the north, North Archie Avenue (Farm to Market Road 1111) to the east, West Millican Street to the south, and North Williams Avenue to the west. The building's facade and main entrance face southward toward Millican St. The building's official address is 201 West Millican Street. The single-story building is constructed from adobe made from local materials with 18-inch (46 cm) walls and is the only remaining adobe courthouse in the state. The building features Spanish Eclectice and Classic Revival styles with Mediterranean influences including Italian and Spanish Colonial Revival design elements. The exterior holds side and central arcades with arched windows but otherwise is of simple design with minimal decorative ornamentation enhancing the native construction material.

The T-shaped structure holds 14,000 square feet (1,300 m^{2}) of floor space including a small basement. The interior has wooden flooring above the basement but otherwise concrete slab floors resting directly upon the ground. In addition to county offices, the building includes a courtroom and other related court spaces.

The block upon which the courthouse is located is a two-block compound within the town's street grid, although the would-be dividing street terminates to the north. The courthouse square, comprising the courthouse itself, surrounding lawn, and supporting infrastructure, makes up the middle half of the courthouse block minus parking areas on all sides. Two half-block areas, one on each side of the square and each separated from the square by a drive, hold newer buildings containing additional county offices. In addition to the state historical marker commemorating the courthouse's distinction as a Recorded Texas Historic Landmark, the square holds an historical marker recounting the Confederate occupation of Fort Quitman in the southern portion of the county along the Rio Grande during the Civil War.

== History ==
Hudspeth County was created by the Legislature in 1917 from adjacent El Paso County. The legislation appointed a temporary county Commissioners Court charged with organizing the county government including the performance of the tedious and time-consuming requirements to do so such as performing a census estimate, defining election precinct and district boundaries for office holders, conducting elections for county offices, reconciling tax rolls with El Paso County, and settling the new county's pro rata share of debt previously incurred by El Paso County.

Despite these challenges, the county was sufficiently organized to construct the courthouse in 1919 hiring architect Bradford Hardie of the architectural firm Beutell & Hardie from El Paso to design the building. Hardie began living in El Paso in 1906 at the age of six and graduated from El Paso High School before pursuing an architectural degree from Cornell University. His design of the courthouse was influenced by his architectural education and the works of other contemporary El Paso architects including Henry Trost. The building was damaged by an earthquake in 1924 likely becoming the only state courthouse to have ever required earthquake-related repair.

The courthouse was designated a Recorded Texas Historic Landmark in August 1962. The building was added to the National Register of Historic Places on May 21, 1975 and declared a State Antiquities Landmark on May 28, 1981.

The foundation and adobe structure, including new plaster and paint, were repaired in 1983 with funding from a federal grant while the roof was replaced in 1991. Under the benefit of a grant of $1,650,847, a major renovation was conducted between 2002 and 2004 as part of the THC's Texas Historic Courthouse Preservation Program. This renovation included new piers structurally reinforcing the foundation in order to support the building's thick adobe walls, a new metal shingle roof, and the removal and replacement of exterior stucco. Interior enhancements incorporated electrical, mechanical, and plumbing upgrades along with the installation of an elevator and fully accessible restrooms.

== See also ==
- National Register of Historic Places listings in Hudspeth County, Texas
- Recorded Texas Historic Landmarks in Hudspeth County
- List of county courthouses in Texas
