= Hudspeth =

Hudspeth is a former medieval village, now farm, located near Elsdon, Northumberland County, England. Hudspeth was given by Richard de Umfraville to Hugh de Morwick when he married Richard's daughter, Sibilla, in 1221.

== See also ==
- Hudspeth County, Texas, county located in the U.S. state of Texas
- National Register of Historic Places listings in Hudspeth County, Texas
