= Finlay, Texas =

- Ghost town
- Location within Texas
- Coordinates: 31°15′31″N 105°37′48″W
- Country: United States
- State: Texas
- County: Hudspeth
- Elevation: 3,947 ft (1,203 m)
- Time zone: UTC-6 (Central (CST))
  - Summer (DST): UTC-5 (CDT)
- ZIP codes: 79839
- Area code: 915
- GNIS feature ID: 1379766

Finlay, Texas is a ghost town in Hudspeth County, Texas, United States, 17 miles (27 km) west of Sierra Blanca. The community was named after J.R. Finlay an early settler in the area who also lent his name to the nearby Finlay Mountains. It had two post offices. One was built in 1890, but never opened. The other was established in 1903. Finlay slowly grew in the early 20th century, but the last population figure was one hundred inhabitants in the 1940s.
