= Cornudas, Texas =

- Unincorporated community
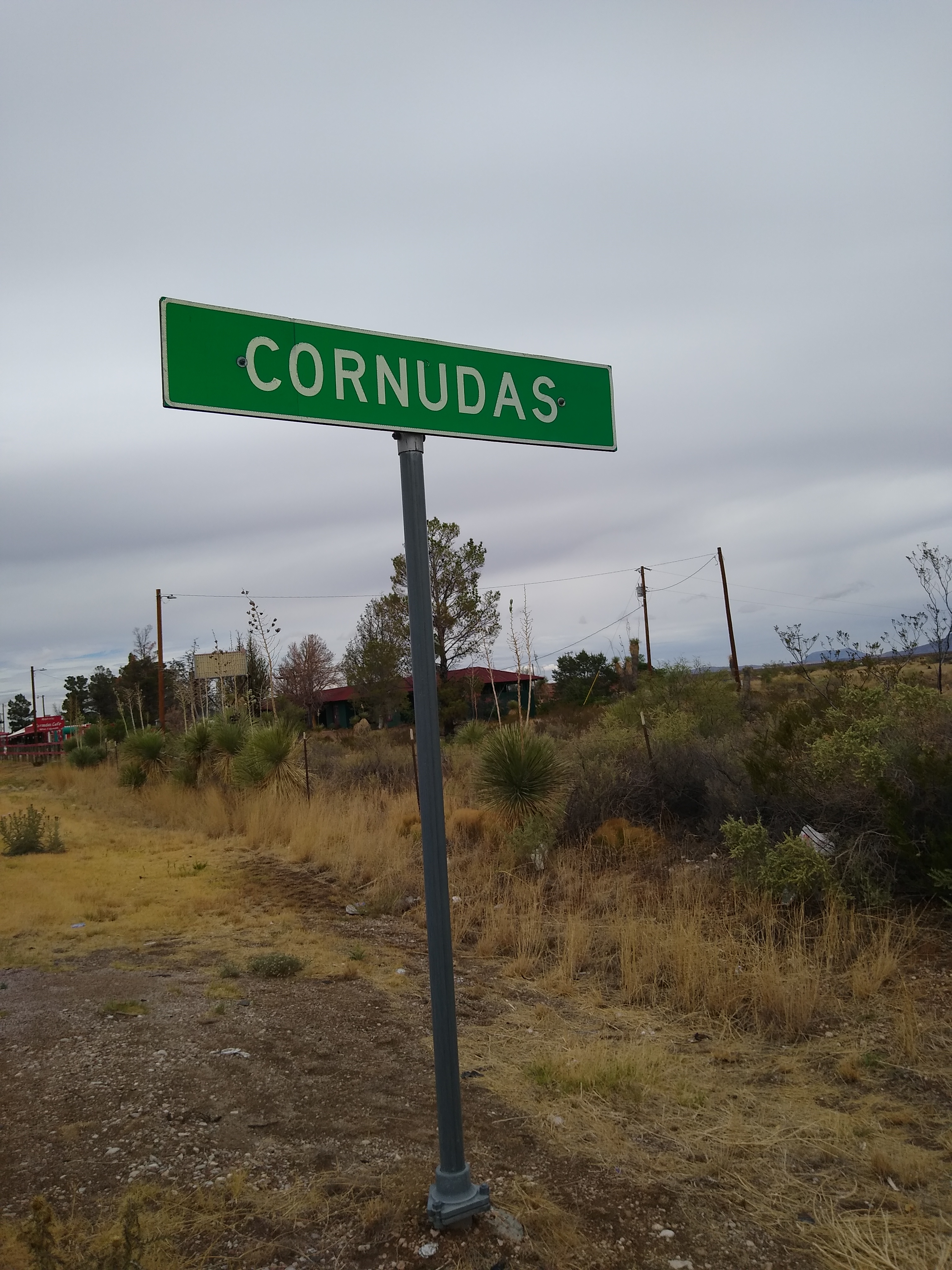

- Location within Texas Location within the United States
- Coordinates: 31°46′47″N 105°28′16″W
- Country: United States
- State: Texas
- County: Hudspeth
- Elevation: 4,308 ft (1,313 m)

Population (2000)
  - Total: 19
- Time zone: UTC-7 (Mountain (MST))
  - Summer (DST): UTC-6 (MDT)
- Area code: 915
- GNIS feature ID: 1379595

Cornudas is an unincorporated community in Hudspeth County, Texas, United States. Cornudas is located near the intersection of Ranch to Market Road 2317 and the concurrent U.S. Highways 62 and 180, 42 miles (68 km) northwest of the county seat, Sierra Blanca. Cornudas was located in 1929 strategically on the most direct route between El Paso (64 miles (103 km) west) and Carlsbad, New Mexico (104 miles (167 km) northeast) as a natural rest and resupply station. It was directly or indirectly named for the Cornudas Mountains that can be seen behind the Cornudas Cafe.

== History ==
There had been a nearly decade long debate in the 1920s in the El Paso economic development committees about the location of a new, more direct route from El Paso to Carlsbad, that would also strategically connect El Paso to the eastern United States. The two options promoted were a northern route, following the historic Butterfield Overland Mail route, hugging the base of the mountains, and the one chosen, a route straight east across the flat desert to connect with the existing Highway 54. Cornudas had an at least aspired to connection with the Cornudas Station (1857-1859) of the Butterfield Overland Mail (actually located 20 miles directly north at the foot of Cornudas de Los Alamos Mountains). It was founded as they finished the highway by Willie Tinnin, as a fuel and food stop, starting in a tent where she cooked pancakes. She previously owned land across the highway, but used squatter's rights to move to the present location and claim 28.8 acres. The road stop soon included a cafe, gas station, and small store.

A post office opened in Cornudas in 1938, though it closed within a year; Willie Tinnin was the only postmistress. At the time, Cornudas primarily served nearby cattle ranches and an El Paso Natural Gas pumping station. The area included a primary school and church. Its population was nineteen in 2000.

Cornudas has always been a single owner town owned by the Tinnin Family (1929-1977), the Derrick Family (1977-1982), "Mayor" May Carson (1982-2018), and now by May's grandson, Jeff Campbell, "City Manager". As of 2003, it sat on 28.8 acres with an additional 100 acres behind purchased by May Carson, and consisted of four residences, five businesses, and a station for the National Weather Service. It included a cafe, gift shop, gas station, hotel with six themed cabin rooms, RV Park, and campground. The town had a water well, electricity, phone lines, large propane tanks, Wifi, 17 street lights, and more than 400 shade trees. A 2005 investor, seeking to build a "resort", transferred historic buildings from El Paso, and arranged them like a historic western town. Campbell has rebranded this section "Historic Cornudas, Tx". May Carson regained ownership and reopened her Cafe in May 2009. Upon her death in 2018, the town was inherited by Campbell. He closed for major structural renovations and maintenance, reopening in October 2020.
