= Etholen, Texas =

- Ghost town
- Location within Texas
- Coordinates: 31°13′32″N 105°25′28″W
- Country: United States
- State: Texas
- County: Hudspeth
- Elevation: 4,646 ft (1,416 m)
- Time zone: UTC-6 (Central (CST))
  - Summer (DST): UTC-5 (CDT)
- ZIP codes: 79839
- Area code: 915
- GNIS feature ID: 1379738

Etholen is a ghost town in Hudspeth County, Texas, United States, allegedly located four miles west of Sierra Blanca. Different sources claim different things about when the town was founded, but particularly it was during the 1880s. Etholen never grew to more than a small railroad station on the Southern Pacific Railroad, as the population was fewer than 25 by the mid-20th century. Etholen was removed from maps in the 1960s.
