= Esperanza, Hudspeth County, Texas =

Esperanza, Texas
- Unincorporated community
- Location within Texas Location within the United States
- Coordinates: 31°09′34″N 105°42′38″W
- Country: United States
- State: Texas
- County: Hudspeth
- Elevation: 3,481 ft (1,061 m)

Population (2000)
  - Total: 75
- Time zone: UTC-7 (Mountain (MST))
  - Summer (DST): UTC-6 (MDT)
- Area code: 915
- GNIS feature ID: 1379734

Esperanza is an unincorporated community in Hudspeth County, Texas, United States. Esperanza is located on Farm to Market Road 192, 21 miles (34 km) west of Sierra Blanca.

== History ==
Esperanza was named for a farm in the area; its name means "hope" in Spanish. In 1935, a post office opened in Esperanza; Bessie Greene McCoy was the first postmaster. Esperanza's population rose from 50 in the 1930s to 100 in the mid-1940s; it remained at 100 until falling to 75 in the 1960s, where it has remained through 2000. As of the late 1980s, the community contained a school and some houses.
