= Acala, Texas =

- Unincorporated community Census designated place
- Location within Texas
- Coordinates: 31°20′04″N 105°54′10″W
- Country: United States
- State: Texas
- County: Hudspeth
- Elevation: 3,576 ft (1,090 m)

Population (2020)
  - Total: 11
- Time zone: UTC-7 (Mountain (MST))
  - Summer (DST): UTC-6 (MDT)
- ZIP code: 79839
- Area code: 915
- FIPS code: 48-01084
- GNIS feature ID: 2805795

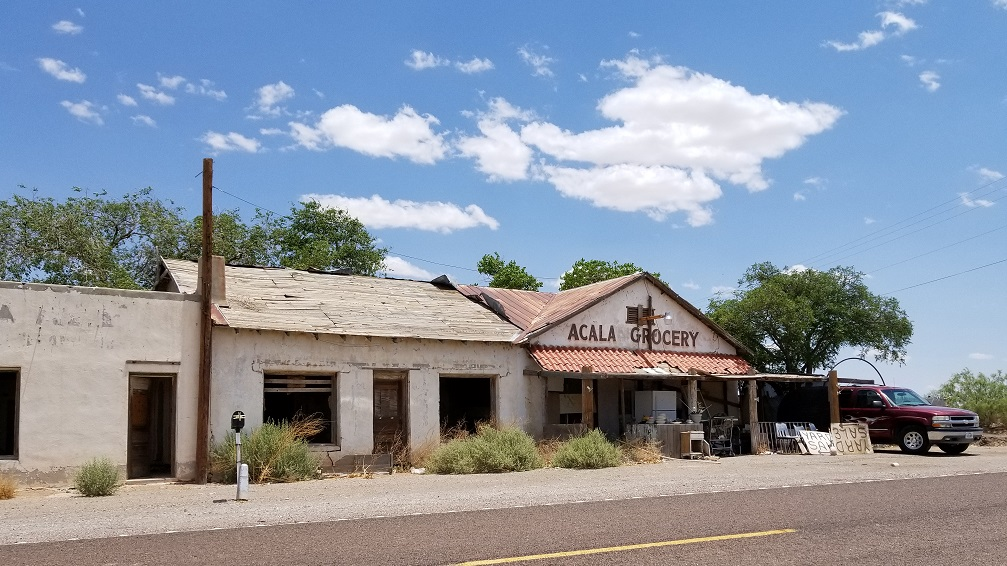
Acala Grocery

Acala is an unincorporated community and census designated place (CDP) in Hudspeth County, Texas, United States. The community is located on Highway 20 34 miles (55 km) northwest of Sierra Blanca and 54 miles (87 km) southeast of El Paso. The community has a population in 2020 of 11. Acala was named for acala cotton, a type of cotton produced in Mexico.

== History ==
The area was settled in the early 20th century and a post office was established in 1925. In 1929, the population had doubled to 100 from its 50 residents just a few years before. It peaked again in the late 1950s at 100 but began to decline again. Only 25 people called Acala home by the 1970s.

== Education ==
It is in the Fort Hancock Independent School District. Fort Hancock High School is the district's comprehensive high school.

== Demographics ==
Historical population
Census	Pop.	Note	%±
1920	50		—
1930	100		100.0%
1940	95		−5.0%
1950	100		5.3%
1960	82		−18.0%
1970	25		−69.5%
1980	9		−64.0%
1990	27		200.0%
2000	18		−33.3%
2010	7		−61.1%
2020	11		57.1%
2024 (est.)	11	Steady	0.0%
U.S. Decennial Census; 1850–1900 1910; 1920 1930 1940; 1950 1960 1970; 1980 1990 2000; 2010 2020

Acala first appeared as a census designated place in the 2020 U.S. census.

=== 2020 census ===
Acala, Texas – Racial and ethnic composition Note: the US Census treats Hispanic/Latino as an ethnic category. This table excludes Latinos from the racial categories and assigns them to a separate category. Hispanics/Latinos may be of any race.
Race / Ethnicity (NH = Non-Hispanic)	Pop 2020	% 2020
White alone (NH)	0	0.00%
Black or African American alone (NH)	0	0.00%
Native American or Alaska Native alone (NH)	0	0.00%
Asian alone (NH)	0	0.00%
Native Hawaiian or Pacific Islander alone (NH)	0	0.00%
Other race alone (NH)	0	0.00%
Mixed race or Multiracial (NH)	0	0.00%
Hispanic or Latino (any race)	11	100.00%
Total	11	100.00%
