= Fort Hancock High School =

Location
- 100 School Drive; Fort Hancock, Texas 79839-0098; United States; 31.289235°N 105.849311°W

Information
- School type: Public High School
- School district: Fort Hancock Independent School District
- Principal: Lorena Molinar
- Teaching staff: 14.43 (FTE)
- Grades: 9-12
- Enrollment: 178 (2023–2024)
- Student to teacher ratio: 12.34
- Colors: Black & White
- Athletics conference: UIL Class AA
- Mascot: Mustang
- Website: Fort Hancock High School

Fort Hancock High School is a public high school located in Fort Hancock, Texas (USA) and it is classified as a 2A school by the UIL. It is part of the Fort Hancock Independent School District located in southern Hudspeth County. In 2011, the school was rated "Academically Acceptable" by the Texas Education Agency.

Its district includes the communities of Fort Hancock and Acala.

== Athletics ==
The Fort Hancock Mustangs compete in the following sports:

- Baseball
- Basketball
- 6-Man Football
- Tennis
- Track and Field
- Volleyball

=== State Titles ===
- Football
  - 1986(6M), 1988(6M), 1989(6M), 1990(6M), 1991(6M)

In 1986 and the years 1988 to 1991, Fort Hancock won a total of 5 state championships in six-Man football, including 4 in a row and set a state record for consecutive wins, which was also the second longest in the nation (70 straight wins).

The team's performance declined in the 2000s, and the population of Fort Hancock itself declined. According to Jordan Ramp of Texas Monthly, "inconsistency of their performance" failed to attract sufficient newcomers, despite that "They had a few good seasons in the 2010s—and a particularly strong run from 2010–2012". As of September 2025, the last win of any game was October 2021, and the team was trying to win again. Ramp wrote that this was "one of the longest losing streaks in the state".
