= National Register of Historic Places listings in Hudspeth County, Texas =

Map with Hudspeth County highlighted in red

This is a list of the National Register of Historic Places in Hudspeth County, Texas

This is intended to be a complete list of properties and districts listed on the National Register of Historic Places in Hudspeth County, Texas. There are three districts and 85 individual properties listed on the National Register in the county.

This National Park Service list is complete through NPS recent listings posted May 30, 2025.

== Current listings ==
The publicly disclosed locations of National Register properties and districts may be seen in a mapping service provided.

	Name on the Register	Image	Date listed	Location	City or town	Description
1	Alamo Canyon-Wilkey Ranch Discontiguous Archeological District		October 28, 1988 (#88002151)	Address restricted	Fort Hancock	
2	Archeological Site No. 41 HZ 1		January 11, 1991 (#90002015)	Address restricted	Sierra Blanca	Indian Hot Springs MPS
3	Archeological Site No. 41 HZ 7		January 11, 1991 (#90002016)	Address restricted	Sierra Blanca	Indian Hot Springs MPS
4	Archeological Site No. 41 HZ 181		January 11, 1991 (#90002017)	Address restricted	Sierra Blanca	Indian Hot Springs MPS
5	Archeological Site No. 41 HZ 182		January 11, 1991 (#90002018)	Address restricted	Sierra Blanca	Indian Hot Springs MPS
6	Archeological Site No. 41 HZ 183		January 11, 1991 (#90002019)	Address restricted	Sierra Blanca	Indian Hot Springs MPS
7	Archeological Site No. 41 HZ 184		January 11, 1991 (#90002020)	Address restricted	Sierra Blanca	Indian Hot Springs MPS
8	Archeological Site No. 41 HZ 190		January 11, 1991 (#90002021)	Address restricted	Sierra Blanca	Indian Hot Springs MPS
9	Archeological Site No. 41 HZ 200		January 11, 1991 (#90002022)	Address restricted	Sierra Blanca	Indian Hot Springs MPS
10	Archeological Site No. 41 HZ 220		January 11, 1991 (#90002023)	Address restricted	Sierra Blanca	Candelilla wax camp; Indian Hot Springs MPS
11	Archeological Site No. 41 HZ 227	Archeological Site No. 41 HZ 227	January 11, 1991 (#90002024)	Address restricted	Sierra Blanca	Likely a location of a 10th Cavalry camp site near Indian Hot Springs that was ambushed on October 28, 1880; Indian Hot Springs MPS
12	Archeological Site No. 41 HZ 228	Archeological Site No. 41 HZ 228	January 11, 1991 (#90002025)	Address restricted	Sierra Blanca	Gravesite near Indian Hot Springs of seven 10th Cavalry members who were killed in an ambush on October 28, 1880; Indian Hot Springs MPS
13	Archeological Site No. 41 HZ 283		January 11, 1991 (#90002026)	Address restricted	Sierra Blanca	Indian Hot Springs MPS
14	Archeological Site No. 41 HZ 284		January 11, 1991 (#90002027)	Address restricted	Sierra Blanca	Indian Hot Springs MPS
15	Archeological Site No. 41 HZ 285		January 11, 1991 (#90002028)	Address restricted	Sierra Blanca	Indian Hot Springs MPS
16	Archeological Site No. 41 HZ 286		January 11, 1991 (#90002029)	Address restricted	Sierra Blanca	Indian Hot Springs MPS
17	Archeological Site No. 41 HZ 287		January 11, 1991 (#90002030)	Address restricted	Sierra Blanca	Indian Hot Springs MPS
18	Archeological Site No. 41 HZ 288		January 11, 1991 (#90002031)	Address restricted	Sierra Blanca	Indian Hot Springs MPS
19	Archeological Site No. 41 HZ 289		January 11, 1991 (#90002032)	Address restricted	Sierra Blanca	Indian Hot Springs MPS
20	Archeological Site No. 41 HZ 290		January 11, 1991 (#90002033)	Address restricted	Sierra Blanca	Indian Hot Springs MPS
21	Archeological Site No. 41 HZ 291		January 11, 1991 (#90002034)	Address restricted	Sierra Blanca	Indian Hot Springs MPS
22	Archeological Site No. 41 HZ 292		January 11, 1991 (#90002035)	Address restricted	Sierra Blanca	Indian Hot Springs MPS
23	Archeological Site No. 41 HZ 293		January 11, 1991 (#90002036)	Address restricted	Sierra Blanca	Indian Hot Springs MPS
24	Archeological Site No. 41 HZ 294		January 11, 1991 (#90002037)	Address restricted	Sierra Blanca	Indian Hot Springs MPS
25	Archeological Site No. 41 HZ 295		January 11, 1991 (#90002038)	Address restricted	Sierra Blanca	Indian Hot Springs MPS
26	Archeological Site No. 41 HZ 296		January 11, 1991 (#90002039)	Address restricted	Sierra Blanca	Indian Hot Springs MPS
27	Archeological Site No. 41 HZ 297		January 11, 1991 (#90002040)	Address restricted	Sierra Blanca	Indian Hot Springs MPS
28	Archeological Site No. 41 HZ 298		January 11, 1991 (#90002041)	Address restricted	Sierra Blanca	Indian Hot Springs MPS
29	Archeological Site No. 41 HZ 299		January 11, 1991 (#90002042)	Address restricted	Sierra Blanca	Indian Hot Springs MPS
30	Archeological Site No. 41 HZ 300		January 11, 1991 (#90002043)	Address restricted	Sierra Blanca	Indian Hot Springs MPS
31	Archeological Site No. 41 HZ 301		January 11, 1991 (#90002044)	Address restricted	Sierra Blanca	Indian Hot Springs MPS
32	Archeological Site No. 41 HZ 302		January 11, 1991 (#90002045)	Address restricted	Sierra Blanca	Indian Hot Springs MPS
33	Archeological Site No. 41 HZ 303		January 11, 1991 (#90002046)	Address restricted	Sierra Blanca	Indian Hot Springs MPS
34	Archeological Site No. 41 HZ 304-305		January 11, 1991 (#90002047)	Address restricted	Sierra Blanca	Indian Hot Springs MPS
35	Archeological Site No. 41 HZ 306		January 11, 1991 (#90002048)	Address restricted	Sierra Blanca	Indian Hot Springs MPS
36	Archeological Site No. 41 HZ 307		January 11, 1991 (#90002049)	Address restricted	Sierra Blanca	Indian Hot Springs MPS
37	Archeological Site No. 41 HZ 308		January 11, 1991 (#90002050)	Address restricted	Sierra Blanca	Indian Hot Springs MPS
38	Archeological Site No. 41 HZ 309		January 11, 1991 (#90002051)	Address restricted	Sierra Blanca	Indian Hot Springs MPS
39	Archeological Site No. 41 HZ 311	Archeological Site No. 41 HZ 311	January 11, 1991 (#90002052)	Address restricted	Sierra Blanca	Indian Hot Springs MPS
40	Archeological Site No. 41 HZ 312	Archeological Site No. 41 HZ 312	January 11, 1991 (#90002053)	Address restricted	Sierra Blanca	Indian Hot Springs MPS
41	Archeological Site No. 41 HZ 313		January 11, 1991 (#90002054)	Address restricted	Sierra Blanca	Indian Hot Springs MPS
42	Archeological Site No. 41 HZ 339		January 11, 1991 (#90002055)	Address restricted	Sierra Blanca	Indian Hot Springs MPS
43	Archeological Site No. 41 HZ 340		January 11, 1991 (#90002056)	Address restricted	Sierra Blanca	Indian Hot Springs MPS
44	Archeological Site No. 41 HZ 409		January 11, 1991 (#90002057)	Address restricted	Sierra Blanca	Indian Hot Springs MPS
45	Archeological Site No. 41 HZ 410		January 11, 1991 (#90002058)	Address restricted	Sierra Blanca	Indian Hot Springs MPS
46	Archeological Site No. 41 HZ 411		January 11, 1991 (#90002059)	Address restricted	Sierra Blanca	Indian Hot Springs MPS
47	Archeological Site No. 41 HZ 412		January 11, 1991 (#90002060)	Address restricted	Sierra Blanca	Indian Hot Springs MPS
48	Archeological Site No. 41 HZ 413		January 11, 1991 (#90002061)	Address restricted	Sierra Blanca	Indian Hot Springs MPS
49	Archeological Site No. 41 HZ 414		January 11, 1991 (#90002062)	Address restricted	Sierra Blanca	Indian Hot Springs MPS
50	Archeological Site No. 41 HZ 415		January 11, 1991 (#90002063)	Address restricted	Sierra Blanca	Candelilla-wax camp; Indian Hot Springs MPS
51	Archeological Site No. 41 HZ 416		January 11, 1991 (#90002064)	Address restricted	Sierra Blanca	Indian Hot Springs MPS
52	Archeological Site No. 41 HZ 417		January 11, 1991 (#90002065)	Address restricted	Sierra Blanca	Indian Hot Springs MPS
53	Archeological Site No. 41 HZ 418		January 11, 1991 (#90002066)	Address restricted	Sierra Blanca	Indian Hot Springs MPS
54	Archeological Site No. 41 HZ 419		January 11, 1991 (#90002067)	Address restricted	Sierra Blanca	Indian Hot Springs MPS
55	Archeological Site No. 41 HZ 420		January 11, 1991 (#90002068)	Address restricted	Sierra Blanca	Indian Hot Springs MPS
56	Archeological Site No. 41 HZ 421		January 11, 1991 (#90002069)	Address restricted	Sierra Blanca	Indian Hot Springs MPS
57	Archeological Site No. 41 HZ 422		January 11, 1991 (#90002070)	Address restricted	Sierra Blanca	Indian Hot Springs MPS
58	Archeological Site No. 41 HZ 423		January 11, 1991 (#90002071)	Address restricted	Sierra Blanca	Candelilla-wax camp; Indian Hot Springs MPS
59	Archeological Site No. 41 HZ 424		January 11, 1991 (#90002072)	Address restricted	Sierra Blanca	Indian Hot Springs MPS
60	Archeological Site No. 41 HZ 425	Archeological Site No. 41 HZ 425	January 11, 1991 (#90002073)	Address restricted	Sierra Blanca	Indian Hot Springs MPS
61	Archeological Site No. 41 HZ 426		January 11, 1991 (#90002074)	Address restricted	Sierra Blanca	Indian Hot Springs MPS
62	Archeological Site No. 41 HZ 427		January 11, 1991 (#90002075)	Address restricted	Sierra Blanca	Indian Hot Springs MPS
63	Archeological Site No. 41 HZ 428		January 11, 1991 (#90002076)	Address restricted	Sierra Blanca	Indian Hot Springs MPS
64	Archeological Site No. 41 HZ 429		January 11, 1991 (#90002077)	Address restricted	Sierra Blanca	Indian Hot Springs MPS
65	Archeological Site No. 41 HZ 430		January 11, 1991 (#90002078)	Address restricted	Sierra Blanca	Indian Hot Springs MPS
66	Archeological Site No. 41 HZ 431		January 11, 1991 (#90002079)	Address restricted	Sierra Blanca	Indian Hot Springs MPS
67	Archeological Site No. 41 HZ 432		January 11, 1991 (#90002080)	Address restricted	Sierra Blanca	Indian Hot Springs MPS
68	Archeological Site No. 41 HZ 433		January 11, 1991 (#90002081)	Address restricted	Sierra Blanca	Indian Hot Springs MPS
69	Archeological Site No. 41 HZ 434		January 11, 1991 (#90002082)	Address restricted	Sierra Blanca	Indian Hot Springs MPS
70	Archeological Site No. 41 HZ 435		January 11, 1991 (#90002083)	Address restricted	Sierra Blanca	Indian Hot Springs MPS
71	Archeological Site No. 41 HZ 436		January 11, 1991 (#90002084)	Address restricted	Sierra Blanca	Indian Hot Springs MPS
72	Archeological Site No. 41 HZ 437		January 11, 1991 (#90002085)	Address restricted	Sierra Blanca	Indian Hot Springs MPS
73	Archeological Site No. 41 HZ 438	Archeological Site No. 41 HZ 438	January 11, 1991 (#90002086)	Address restricted	Sierra Blanca	Indian Hot Springs MPS
74	Archeological Site No. 41 HZ 439		January 11, 1991 (#90002087)	Address restricted	Sierra Blanca	Tenth Cavalry campsite; Indian Hot Springs MPS
75	Archeological Site No. 41 HZ 440		January 11, 1991 (#90002088)	Address restricted	Sierra Blanca	Indian Hot Springs MPS
76	Archeological Site No. 41 HZ 441		January 11, 1991 (#90002089)	Address restricted	Sierra Blanca	Indian Hot Springs MPS
77	Archeological Site No. 41 HZ 442		January 11, 1991 (#90002090)	Address restricted	Sierra Blanca	Indian Hot Springs MPS
78	Archeological Site No. 41 HZ 443		January 11, 1991 (#90002091)	Address restricted	Sierra Blanca	Indian Hot Springs MPS
79	Archeological Site No. 41 HZ 445	Archeological Site No. 41 HZ 445	January 11, 1991 (#90002093)	Address restricted	Sierra Blanca	Indian Hot Springs MPS
80	Archeological Site No. 41 HZ 448		January 11, 1991 (#90002094)	Address restricted	Sierra Blanca	Indian Hot Springs MPS
81	Archeological Site No. 41 HZ 464		January 11, 1991 (#90002095)	Address restricted	Sierra Blanca	Indian Hot Springs MPS
82	Archeological Site No. 41 HZ 465		January 11, 1991 (#90002096)	Address restricted	Sierra Blanca	Indian Hot Springs MPS
83	Butterfield Overland Mail Corridor	Butterfield Overland Mail Corridor	August 27, 2014 (#14000524)	400 Pine Canyon Road. (Guadalupe Mountains National Park); 31°53′36″N 104°48′57″W	Salt Flat vicinity	Extends into Culberson County.
84	Hudspeth County Courthouse	Hudspeth County Courthouse	May 21, 1975 (#75001993)	Millican St. 31°10′47″N 105°21′25″W	Sierra Blanca	State Antiquities Landmark; Recorded Texas Historic Landmark
85	Indian Hot Springs Health Resort Historic District	Indian Hot Springs Health Resort Historic District	January 11, 1991 (#90002092)	Along the Rio Grande south of Sierra Blanca; 30°49′31″N 105°19′32″W	Sierra Blanca	Indian Hot Springs MPS
86	Rod Johnson Site		November 1, 1979 (#79002979)	Address restricted	Sierra Blanca	
87	Red Rock Archeological Complex	Red Rock Archeological Complex	May 2, 1977 (#77001454)	Address restricted	Allamore	
88	Tinaja de las Palmas Battle Site		November 7, 1979 (#79002980)	Address restricted	Sierra Blanca	

== See also ==
- National Register of Historic Places listings in Guadalupe Mountains National Park
- National Register of Historic Places listings in Texas
- Recorded Texas Historic Landmarks in Hudspeth County
