= Desert Haven, Texas =

Desert Haven
- Unincorporated area
- Location within the state of Texas
- Coordinates: 31°50′10″N 105°57′43″W
- Country: United States
- State: Texas
- County: Hudspeth
- Time zone: UTC-6 (Central (CST))
  - Summer (DST): UTC-5 (CDT)

Desert Haven is an unincorporated community in Hudspeth County, Texas, United States. It lies along US Highway 62–180 in the northwestern part of the county, just east of the El Paso County line, approximately 28 miles east of El Paso, and is synonymous with Loma Linda Estates Colonia.

== Government and infrastructure ==
The local fire department is the Desert Haven Fire Department.
