= Fort Hancock, Texas =

- Census-designated place
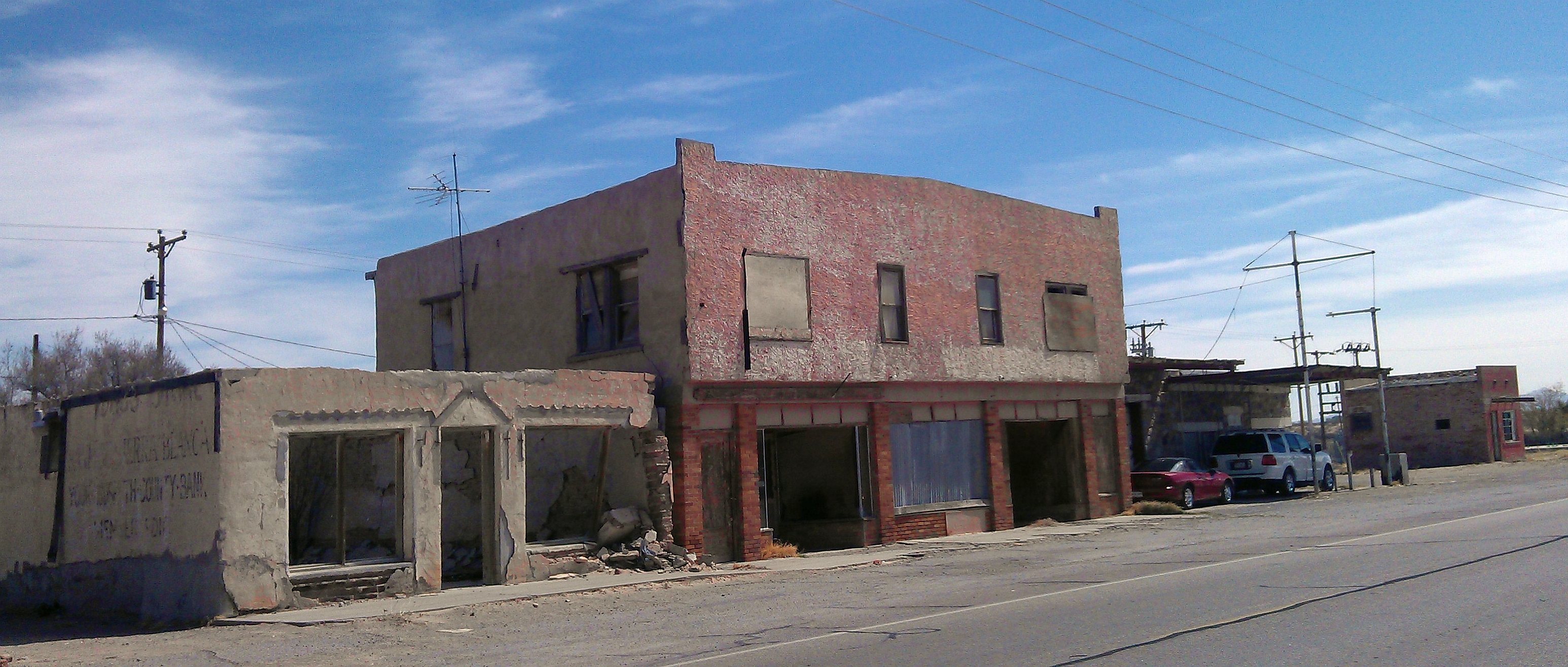
- Abandoned buildings along State Highway 20 in Fort Hancock

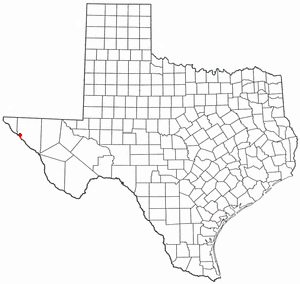
- Location of Fort Hancock, Texas

- Coordinates: 31°17′30″N 105°50′40″W
- Country: United States
- State: Texas
- County: Hudspeth

Area
  - Total: 19.2 sq mi (49.7 km^{2})
  - Land: 18.9 sq mi (49.0 km^{2})
  - Water: 0.27 sq mi (0.7 km^{2})
- Elevation: 3,524 ft (1,074 m)

Population (2020)
  - Total: 1,052
  - Density: 55.52/sq mi (21.44/km^{2})
- Time zone: UTC-7 (Mountain (MST))
  - Summer (DST): UTC-6 (MDT)
- ZIP code: 79839
- Area code: 915
- FIPS code: 48-26724
- GNIS feature ID: 2408240

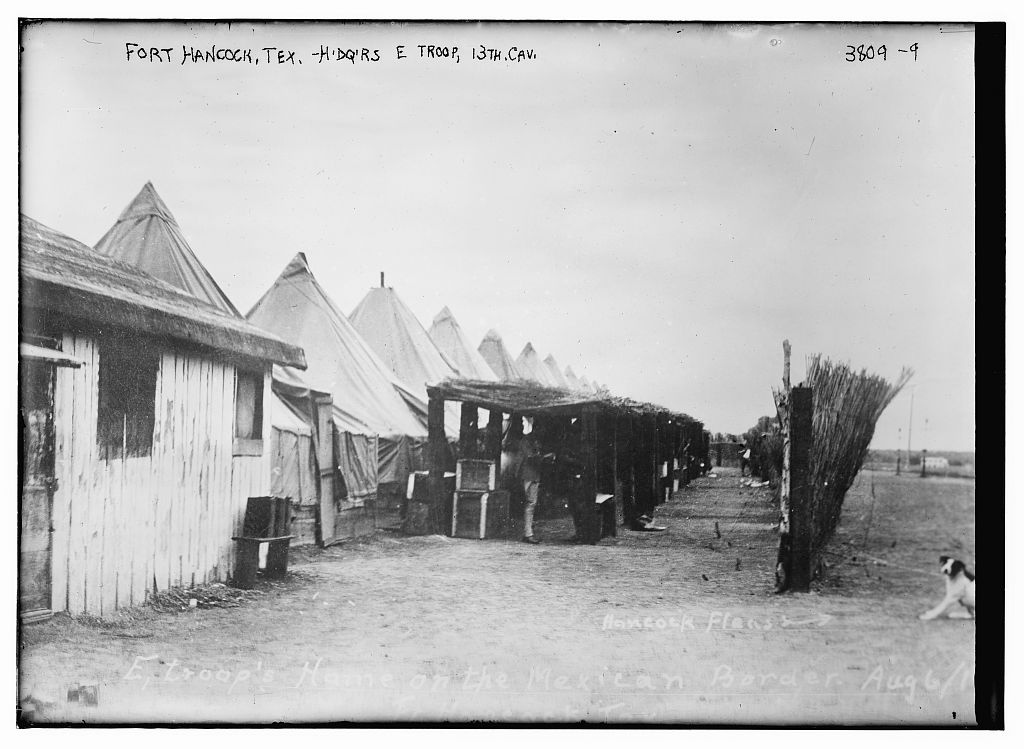
Fort Hancock in 1916

Fort Hancock is an unincorporated community and census-designated place (CDP) in Hudspeth County, Texas, United States. Its population was 1,052 at the 2020 census.

Fort Hancock is situated on the Mexico–United States border, across from El Porvenir, Chihuahua. The Fort Hancock–El Porvenir International Bridge connects the two communities, and the Fort Hancock Port of Entry is located on the Texas side.

Texas State Highway 20 and the Union Pacific Railroad run through the town.

== History ==
=== Camp Rice and Fort Hancock ===
Fort Hancock began as a military establishment named Camp Rice in 1882, along the San Antonio-El Paso Road. Camp Rice had formerly been located at Fort Quitman, and had been established by troops of the 10th U.S. Cavalry "buffalo soldiers". Camp Rice did not grow after moving to this community, and rarely hosted more than 60 men. It was renamed Fort Hancock in 1886 after the death of General Winfield Scott Hancock, a hero of the Battle of Gettysburg. The fort was damaged in a flood that year, but rebuilt. It was damaged again by fires in 1889, then abandoned in 1895. The remains of the old fort are located in a cotton field about 1.5 miles (2.4 km) west of present-day Fort Hancock.

=== Town of Fort Hancock ===
A post office was established in 1886, with Albert Warren as postmaster. In 1887, a new railroad depot was built at Fort Hancock, and by 1890, a town had grown up around it and had a population of 200, a general store, a hotel, and a meat market.

By 1914, the population of the town had dropped to 50, though by 1940, it had increased to 500.

Federal troops were sent to Fort Hancock in 1918 to contain Mexican "bandits and outlaws" operating along the border. The bandits were suspected of being directed by German agents.

In 1995, a 13-year-old Ricardo Soto "trying to get toys for Christmas" fired three rifle shots at a semitrailer traveling along nearby Interstate 10, hoping to blow out a tire so the truck would spill its load. He instead hit the driver of a pickup truck, Alberto Tarango, fatally wounding him. The man succumbed to his injuries two days later.

Officials in Fort Hancock raised the speed limit to 80 miles per hour (130 km/h) in 2006 along their portion of Interstate 10, making it the highest speed limit in the country.

In 2006, CNN did a feature story about Fort Hancock, highlighting the close relationship between families living on the US and Mexican sides of the border. In the introduction, it described how "illegal immigrants risk their lives to cross the border, but not in Fort Hancock, Texas. A casual stroll across the foot bridge gets you in there." In an interview with Hudspeth County Deputy Sheriff Mike Doyal, he described the border as "just an open footway traffic for people coming across", and showed one of the four unguarded foot bridges that connect Fort Hancock to Mexico. Doyal spoke fondly of his Mexican neighbors, saying "those are not the people that we have a problem with, because I'm going to make it real clear that some of those people on the other side are some of the nicest people you would ever want to meet in your life." CNN described Fort Hancock as "a timeless place", adding, "for people who live here, the border barely exists. We found these Mexican cattle ranchers moving their herd along the river. A few times the cows [sic] would move into the U.S., the buckaroos rode across the dried-out river and collected their animals."

The quiescent community described by CNN in 2006 had changed significantly by 2010 when residents became increasingly concerned that violence associated with the Mexican drug trade would spill across the border. In one instance, Deputy Sheriff Doyal announced to townspeople: "We just got word that the cartel has threatened to kill children in schools across the border unless parents paid 5000 pesos." The county's sheriff, Arvin West, cautioned farmers to arm themselves.

The newly erected Mexico–United States barrier is not a continuous wall, but rather a segmented one, at places no more than a fence. This has led many unauthorized migrants to traverse the barrier on the Mexican side in search of a break; breaks are often in remote desert areas like Fort Hancock. This "funnel effect" has contributed to the deaths of thousands of unauthorized migrants, who are frequently found dead in the hot Texas sun. Journalist Joseph J. Kolb interviewed local rancher Lupe Dempsey, who described how "on her doorstep was a 25-year-old man named Juan who, thirsty and disoriented, told how he'd become lost after illegally crossing the border and had wandered the desert in 110-degree heat." Kolb added, "His story was not unique to Dempsey and others in this West Texas town, where the 18-foot-high U.S. border fence ends abruptly, giving way to a few strands of barbed wire."

== Geography ==
The Fort Hancock CDP is in southwestern Hudspeth County, bordered to the southwest by the Rio Grande and to the northeast by Interstate 10, with access from exits 68, 72, and 78. I-10 leads northwest 52 miles (84 km) to El Paso and east 67 miles (108 km) to Van Horn. According to the United States Census Bureau, the CDP has a total area of 19.2 square miles (49.7 km^{2}), of which 19.0 square miles (49.1 km^{2}) are land and 0.3 sq mi (0.7 km^{2}), or 1.33%, are covered by water.

== Climate ==
According to the Köppen Climate Classification system, Fort Hancock has a cold desert climate, abbreviated "BWk" on climate maps. The hottest temperature recorded in Fort Hancock was 113 °F (45.0 °C) on June 27, 1994, while the coldest temperature recorded was −4 °F (−20.0 °C) on February 4, 2011.

Climate data for Fort Hancock, Texas, 1991–2020 normals, extremes 1966–present
Month	Jan	Feb	Mar	Apr	May	Jun	Jul	Aug	Sep	Oct	Nov	Dec	Year
Record high °F (°C)	83 (28)	89 (32)	98 (37)	98 (37)	107 (42)	113 (45)	111 (44)	111 (44)	105 (41)	100 (38)	89 (32)	81 (27)	113 (45)
Mean maximum °F (°C)	75.5 (24.2)	80.9 (27.2)	88.2 (31.2)	93.3 (34.1)	101.0 (38.3)	105.9 (41.1)	105.1 (40.6)	101.7 (38.7)	98.4 (36.9)	92.9 (33.8)	83.4 (28.6)	75.7 (24.3)	107.0 (41.7)
Mean daily maximum °F (°C)	61.3 (16.3)	67.4 (19.7)	74.7 (23.7)	82.7 (28.2)	91.3 (32.9)	98.3 (36.8)	96.3 (35.7)	94.4 (34.7)	89.6 (32.0)	82.4 (28.0)	70.5 (21.4)	60.7 (15.9)	80.8 (27.1)
Daily mean °F (°C)	44.1 (6.7)	49.5 (9.7)	56.5 (13.6)	64.2 (17.9)	72.7 (22.6)	81.5 (27.5)	82.8 (28.2)	81.1 (27.3)	75.3 (24.1)	65.3 (18.5)	53.1 (11.7)	44.1 (6.7)	64.2 (17.9)
Mean daily minimum °F (°C)	26.8 (−2.9)	31.7 (−0.2)	38.2 (3.4)	45.6 (7.6)	54.2 (12.3)	64.8 (18.2)	69.3 (20.7)	67.9 (19.9)	61.0 (16.1)	48.2 (9.0)	35.6 (2.0)	27.6 (−2.4)	47.6 (8.6)
Mean minimum °F (°C)	14.9 (−9.5)	17.7 (−7.9)	24.2 (−4.3)	31.7 (−0.2)	40.7 (4.8)	52.0 (11.1)	61.6 (16.4)	59.5 (15.3)	49.9 (9.9)	32.1 (0.1)	22.0 (−5.6)	15.8 (−9.0)	11.7 (−11.3)
Record low °F (°C)	4 (−16)	−4 (−20)	14 (−10)	23 (−5)	26 (−3)	42 (6)	53 (12)	46 (8)	30 (−1)	8 (−13)	5 (−15)	−1 (−18)	−4 (−20)
Average precipitation inches (mm)	0.57 (14)	0.33 (8.4)	0.20 (5.1)	0.21 (5.3)	0.38 (9.7)	0.68 (17)	1.58 (40)	1.36 (35)	1.18 (30)	0.87 (22)	0.38 (9.7)	0.58 (15)	8.32 (211.2)
Average snowfall inches (cm)	0.1 (0.25)	0.0 (0.0)	0.0 (0.0)	0.0 (0.0)	0.0 (0.0)	0.0 (0.0)	0.0 (0.0)	0.0 (0.0)	0.0 (0.0)	0.0 (0.0)	0.0 (0.0)	0.0 (0.0)	0.1 (0.25)
Average precipitation days (≥ 0.01 in)	2.1	1.8	1.4	1.1	1.7	2.9	6.0	5.8	4.0	3.3	1.6	2.2	33.9
Average snowy days (≥ 0.1 in)	0.0	0.0	0.0	0.0	0.0	0.0	0.0	0.0	0.0	0.0	0.0	0.0	0.0
Source 1: NOAA
Source 2: National Weather Service

== Demographics ==
Historical population
Census	Pop.	Note	%±
2000	1,713		—
2010	1,750		2.2%
2020	1,052		−39.9%
U.S. Decennial Census; 1850–1900 1910; 1920 1930 1940; 1950 1960 1970; 1980 1990 2000; 2010

Fort Hancock first appeared as a census designated place in the 2000 U.S. census.

=== 2020 census ===
Fort Hancock CDP, Texas – Racial and ethnic composition Note: the US Census treats Hispanic/Latino as an ethnic category. This table excludes Latinos from the racial categories and assigns them to a separate category. Hispanics/Latinos may be of any race.
Race / Ethnicity (NH = Non-Hispanic)	Pop 2000	Pop 2010	Pop 2020	% 2000	% 2010	% 2020
White alone (NH)	149	63	34	8.70%	3.60%	3.23%
Black or African American alone (NH)	0	0	0	0.00%	0.00%	0.00%
Native American or Alaska Native alone (NH)	3	4	0	0.18%	0.23%	0.00%
Asian alone (NH)	0	5	0	0.00%	0.29%	0.00%
Native Hawaiian or Pacific Islander alone (NH)	0	0	0	0.00%	0.00%	0.00%
Other race alone (NH)	0	0	1	0.00%	0.00%	0.10%
Mixed race or Multiracial (NH)	5	9	1	0.29%	0.51%	0.10%
Hispanic or Latino (any race)	1,556	1,669	1,016	90.83%	95.37%	96.58%
Total	1,713	1,750	1,052	100.00%	100.00%	100.00%

As of the 2020 United States census, there were 1,052 people, 453 households, and 353 families residing in the CDP.

=== 2019 ===
As of the census of 2019, 1,213 people, 487 households, and 445 families resided in the CDP. The population density was 45.5 people/sq mi (17.6/km^{2}). The 579 housing units averaged 15.4/sq mi (5.9/km^{2}). The racial makeup of the CDP was 94.51% White, 0.18% Native American, 4.03% from other races, and 1.28% from two or more races. Hispanics or Latinos of any race were 90.83% of the population.

Of the 486 households, 58.6% had children under 18 living with them, 66.7% were married couples living together, 14.0% had a female householder with no husband present, and 16.5% were not families. About 15.2% of all households were made up of individuals, and 8.2% had someone living alone who was 65 years of age or older. The average household size was 3.52 and the average family size was 3.97.

In the CDP, the population was distributed as 39.3% under 18, 9.3% from 18 to 24, 27.1% from 25 to 44, 16.3% from 45 to 64, and 7.9% who were 65 or older. The median age was 26 years. For every 100 females, there were 105.6 males. For every 100 females age 18 and over, there were 90.3 males.

The median income for a household was $17,525, and for a family was $18,560. Males had a median income of $17,411 versus $13,281 for females. The per capita income for the CDP was $7,037. About 44.6% of families and 46.7% of the population were below the poverty line, including 50.7% of those under age 18 and 57.6% of those age 65 or over.

== Education ==
The community is served by the Fort Hancock Independent School District, and high school students attend Fort Hancock High School. The high school competes in six-man football, and between 1986 and 1992, their team, the Mustangs, competed six times in the state championship, winning five (one streak lasted four years). The coach for the state-championship teams was Mr. Danny Medina, who is currently the principal of Fort Hancock Middle School. Mr. Jose Franco served as the team's assistant coach and is currently Fort Hancock ISD's Superintendent. Mustang Stadium in Fort Hancock has a capacity of 800.

Hudspeth County is in the official service area of El Paso Community College.

== Notable people ==
- Benito Martinez, who was born and raised in Fort Hancock, was posthumously awarded the Medal of Honor for his actions during the Korean War.
