= Benito Martinez (soldier) =

Medal of Honor Recipient

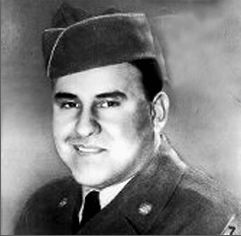
- Martinez in c. 1950
- Born: April 21, 1932; Fort Hancock, Texas, US
- Died: September 6, 1952 (aged 20) near Hwacheon, Korea
- Burial place: Fort Bliss National Cemetery, El Paso, Texas
- Military career
- Allegiance: United States
- Branch: United States Army
- Service years: 1950–1952
- Rank: Corporal
- Units: 1st Battalion, 27th Infantry Regiment, 25th Infantry Division
- Conflicts: Korean War (DOW)
- Awards: Medal of Honor; Purple Heart

Benito Martinez (April 21, 1932 – September 6, 1952) was a United States Army soldier who was posthumously awarded the Medal of Honor — the United States' highest military decoration — for his actions on the near Satae-ri in Korea during the Korean War. Martinez was mortally wounded while solely defending his outpost. His actions enabled his company to take back the terrain which they had lost.

== Early years ==
Martinez was a Mexican-American born to Mr. and Mrs. Francisco Martinez in Fort Hancock, Texas. There, he received his primary and secondary education. He joined the United States Army in 1950 at the recruiting station in his hometown. Martinez completed his basic training and was eventually assigned to Company A (Able Company) of the 27th Infantry Regiment.

== Korean War ==
North Korea invaded the Republic of Korea on June 25, 1950. The 27th Infantry Regiment, part of the 25th Infantry Division, was stationed in Hawaii, and in July was put on alert. By July 18, the entire division was in Pusan in Republic of Korea.

On February 23, 1952, the 25th Division, under the command of Major General Ira P. Swift, was in the front line in the center of the X Corps sector near Mundung-ni northeast of the Hwach'on Reservoir. The division assumed the front line routine of patrols, ambushes, artillery exchanges, and bunker maintenance. The division also secured and defended forward outposts beyond the Jamestown Line, the main line of resistance.

Martinez's unit, the 2nd Platoon of A Company, inherited a position known as Sandbag Castle from Charlie Company. On the night of September 5, 1952, Corporal Martinez was in Outpost Agnes performing forward listening-post duties. Outpost Agnes was a bunker large enough to hold four soldiers. Shortly after midnight, the Korean People's Army (KPA) began shelling Sandbag Castle. During a lull in the shelling, the men of the 27th inside the castle were able to spot crawling KPA soldiers, whose intentions were to cut off the forward bunkers and Outpost Agnes.

Martinez ordered the three men in his bunker to return to the Sandbag Castle. His commanding officer, Lieutenant McLean, called him on the sound power telephone and ordered him to get out. Martinez, knowing the situation better than anyone, replied that he would have to stay on and delay the KPA as long as possible. Martinez, along with Private First Class Paul G. Myatt, remained at his post and with his machine gun inflicted numerous casualties on the attacking troops. When he ran out of ammunition, he retreated to a bunker destroyed by enemy shelling and from there continued his assault with a Browning automatic rifle. Martinez was mortally wounded and Myatt was taken prisoner before their unit was able to counterattack and regain their terrain.

On December 29, 1953, President Harry S. Truman presented the family of Benito Martinez with the Medal of Honor.

== Medal of Honor citation ==
BENITO MARTINEZ
Rank and organization:Corporal, U.S. Army, Company A, 27th Infantry Regiment, 25th Infantry Division.
Place and date:Near Satae-ri Korea, September 6, 1952.
Entered service at:Fort Hancock, Texas
Born: March 21, 1931, Fort Hancock, Texas
G.O. No.: 96, December 29, 1953
Citation:

Cpl. Martinez, a machine gunner with Company A, distinguished himself by conspicuous gallantry and outstanding courage above and beyond the call of duty in action against the enemy. While manning a listening post forward of the main line of resistance, his position was attacked by a hostile force of reinforced company strength. In the bitter fighting which ensued, the enemy infiltrated the defense perimeter, and realizing that encirclement was imminent, Cpl. Martinez elected to remain at his post in an attempt to stem the onslaught. In a daring defense, he raked the attacking troops with crippling fire, inflicting numerous casualties. Although contacted by sound power phone several times, he insisted that no attempt be made to rescue him because of the danger involved. Soon thereafter, the hostile forces rushed the emplacement, forcing him to make a limited withdrawal with only an automatic rifle and pistol to defend himself. After a courageous 6-hour stand and shortly before dawn, he called in for the last time, stating that the enemy was converging on his position. His magnificent stand enabled friendly elements to reorganize, attack, and regain the key terrain. Cpl. Martinez' incredible valor and supreme sacrifice reflect lasting glory upon himself and are in keeping with the honored traditions of the military service.

== Honors ==
Martinez was buried in Fort Hancock Cemetery and exhumed in the 1980s to be buried with full military honors at Fort Bliss National Cemetery in El Paso, Texas. Both cities, El Paso and Fort Hancock, have honored his memory by naming elementary schools after him.

== Awards and Decorations ==
Among Benito Martinez's decorations and medals were:

| Badge | Combat Infantryman Badge | | |
| 1st row | Medal of Honor | | |
| 2nd row | Purple Heart | Army Good Conduct Medal | National Defense Service Medal |
| 3rd row | Korean Service Medal with 2 Campaign stars | United Nations Service Medal Korea | Korean War Service Medal Retroactively Awarded, 2003 |
| Unit awards | Presidential Unit Citation | | Korean Presidential Unit Citation |

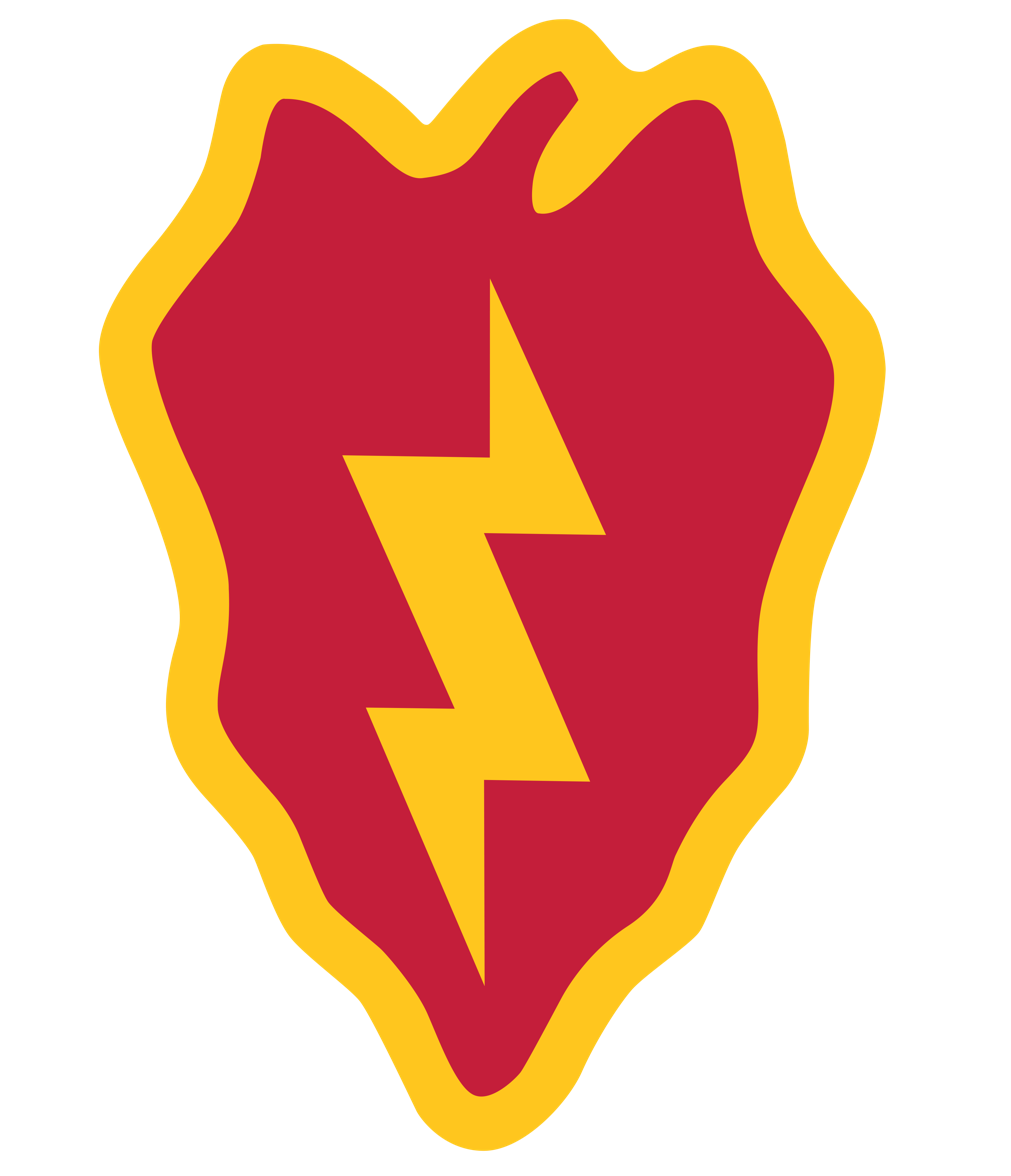

25th Infantry Division Insignia

== See also ==
- List of Korean War Medal of Honor recipients
- Hispanic Medal of Honor recipients
