= Arthur Tracy Lee =

American Civil War officer and artist

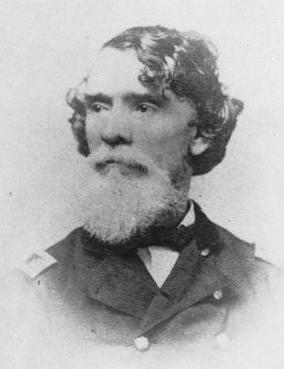
- Colonel Arthur T. Lee
- Born: June 26, 1814; Northumberland, Pennsylvania, US
- Died: December 29, 1879 (aged 65); Rochester, New York, US
- Burial place: Mount Hope Cemetery; Rochester, New York, US
- Military career
- Allegiance: United States of America; Union
- Branch: United States Army; Union Army
- Service years: 1838–65
- Rank: Colonel
- Commands: 2nd Infantry Regiment, Army of the Potomac
- Conflicts: Seminole War Mexican–American War: Battle of Palo Alto; Battle of Resaca de la Palma; Cortina War American Civil War: Battle of Gettysburg

Arthur Tracy Lee (June 26, 1814 – December 29, 1879) served as an officer in the regular army before and during the American Civil War. He was also an author, painter, musician, and architect.

== Early life and career ==
Lee was born in Northumberland, Pennsylvania, to James Lee and Catharine Shriner. As a youth, he studied art in Philadelphia, supposedly under Thomas Sully. On October 3, 1838, he was commissioned as a second lieutenant in the 5th United States Infantry Regiment, mostly through the influence of Simon Cameron. Less than a month later, on November 1, he was transferred to the 8th United States Infantry Regiment. He assisted in the 1840 removal of Winnebago Indians from Wisconsin and later participated in the Seminole War. While in Florida, he met Margaret Wenthworth Spafford, whom he married on July 27, 1844, at St. Augustine. They had five children, only one of whom survived childhood.

== Mexican–American War ==
On March 4, 1845, Lee was promoted to 1st lieutenant. His unit was transferred to Texas in September of that year and placed under General Zachary Taylor. At the battles of Palo Alto and Resaca de la Palma, he commanded a company of the regiment, serving alongside 1st Lieutenant James Longstreet. He wrote a poem about both of these battles.

== Other assignments ==
In September 1846, Lee was dispatched to Rochester, New York, to act as a recruiter. During this time, on January 27, 1848, he was promoted to captain. He finished his recruiting duty that July and in the fall, he helped with the removal of Winnebago Indians in Minnesota. Late that year, he returned to Texas and his command of Company C. In October 1849, Lee, along with his company, moved to Fort Croghan to protect white settlers who were intruding on Indian territory. Four different times, from 1849 to 1851, he served as the commander here. His company, along with four other companies of the 8th US Infantry, established Fort McKavett in 1852, to protect west Texas settlers and to act as a rest-stop for California-bound immigrants. During his command here, he had daily contact with southern Comanches, including Buffalo Hump, Yellow Wolf, Ketumsee, and Sanaco. Lee wrote on May 15, 1852, "I have upon all occasions found them to be friendly & well disposed towards the whites, provided they were supplied with food necessary to sustain life."

Lee and his regiment were also dispatched to other camps, including Fort Martin Scott, Fort Worth, Fort Mason, and Fort Chadbourne.

The 8th US Infantry was ordered in October 1854 to establish a fort in the Davis Mountains, which was further west, entering Apache territory. During his four years at Fort Davis, he spent time sketching and watercoloring. There are 154 known paintings, depicting much of what he saw during his service.

When September 1858 came around, Lee, who was in command of two companies, was ordered 120 miles further west, to establish Fort Quitman. A year later, he was ordered to Fort Brown to help with the Cortina War. He did not arrive until after the skirmishes had ceased, so he did not see any military action. Lee was next assigned to Fort Stockton.

== Civil War ==
While at Fort Stockton, Lee learned of the secession of Texas from the Union. With his company, he began marching towards the coast in an attempt to get his men out of the state. On April 21, 1861, they were captured in San Antonio by Confederate forces. He was arrested and then paroled under the condition that he not take up arms against the Confederate government or give information against Confederate interests unless "regularly engaged."

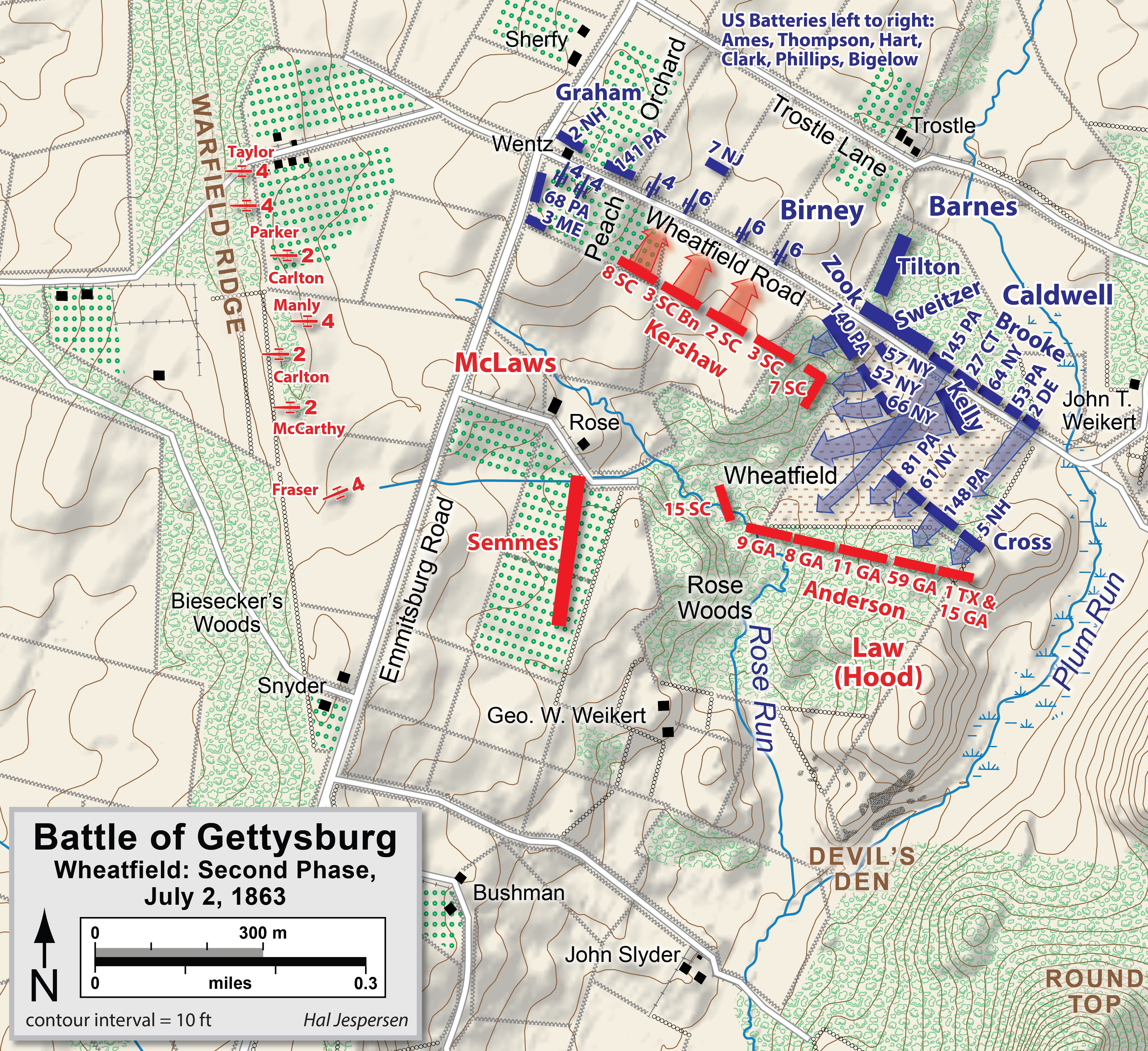
Gettysburg, July 2.

On October 26, 1861, he was appointed as major of the 2nd Infantry Regiment. Complying with his parole terms, he spent much of his time doing various assignments in the North, but when his parole expired, he joined his regiment in time to command them at the Battle of Gettysburg.

=== Gettysburg ===
On July 2, 1863, at 3:30 am, Lee advanced his regiment towards Gettysburg, which was five miles away. When they were about 1½ miles southeast of the town, twenty men were pushed forward as skirmishers to probe enemy pickets, which could be seen beyond a body of woods. After skirmishing for about 2 hours and suffering light casualties, they were withdrawn and marched two miles to the left rear, where they rested.

Around 5:00 pm, Lee was ordered to join the fighting at the Wheatfield, forming the right of Colonel Sidney Burbank's brigade. Traveling through Plum Run to reach their objective, they came upon a marshy area, that at places, was ankle-deep in mud. Confederate sharpshooters from the left, right, and front began firing upon the regiment. After ordering his unit to double-quick, Lee was able to force the sharpshooters back, driving them from the edge of the Rose Woods on Houck's Ridge. He came upon a stone wall at the edge of the Wheatfield and his unit was ordered to halt, taking cover behind the wall.

Due to the attack being made by Colonel Jacob B. Sweitzer's brigade, Colonel Burbank could not advance his brigade, as the attack was being made perpendicular to their current position, with the enemy to the left. When Sweitzer's brigade had retired, Lee was ordered to advance. After having his unit jump over the stone wall, they began to make a left wheel. Halfway into the wheel, Lee noticed the Confederates moving quickly to the right, in hopes of outflanking his regiment. Ordering his regiment to halt, firing was commenced and the enemy returned fire. Lee was subsequently wounded in the right ankle and hip as a result.

After some severe fighting, a fresh column of Confederate infantry appeared on the right and Lee was ordered to withdraw his regiment. As soon as they started withdrawing, three lines of infantry, elevated one line above each other to their right, opened fire. The color-staff was cut in half, causing the colors to fall into the hands of the color-bearer. They retired slowly to the woods, stone wall, and then the marsh, all while under fire from sharpshooters on the left at Devil's Den and from the columns of infantry to the right. Returning to his battle line, Lee transferred command of the regiment to Captain Samuel A. McKee, under advice from the surgeon.

Due to the seriousness of his wounds, Lee did not return to active duty. However, for his actions that day, he was brevetted to lieutenant colonel. On January 20, 1865, he retired from active duty.

== Postbellum ==
Lee received a retroactive promotion to colonel on July 28, 1866, for years of service in the United States Army. From 1867 through 1872, he served as the governor of the Old Soldier's Home in Washington, D.C. In 1871, two of his literary works, Army Ballads, and Other Poems and "Reminiscences of the Regiment," which was featured in the History of the Eighth U.S. Infantry, were published.

In 1872, after giving up his position as governor, he moved to Rochester, New York, with Margaret. He continued painting, spending his summers at Shelter Island.

On December 29, 1879, Lee died at his home and was buried in Mount Hope Cemetery in Rochester.

== Gallery of works ==
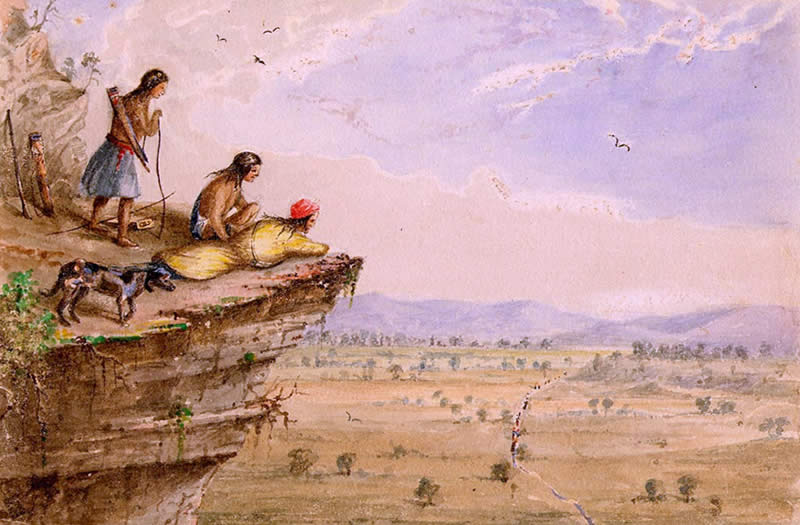
Comanche Lookout, Rochester Historical Society, New York

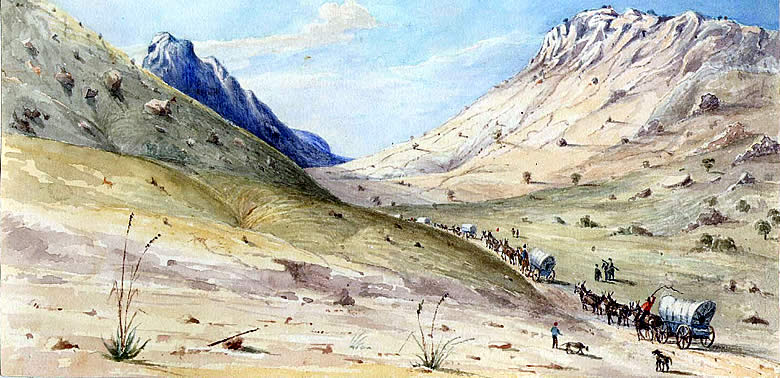
Entrance to Wild Rose Pass, Rochester Historical Society, New York

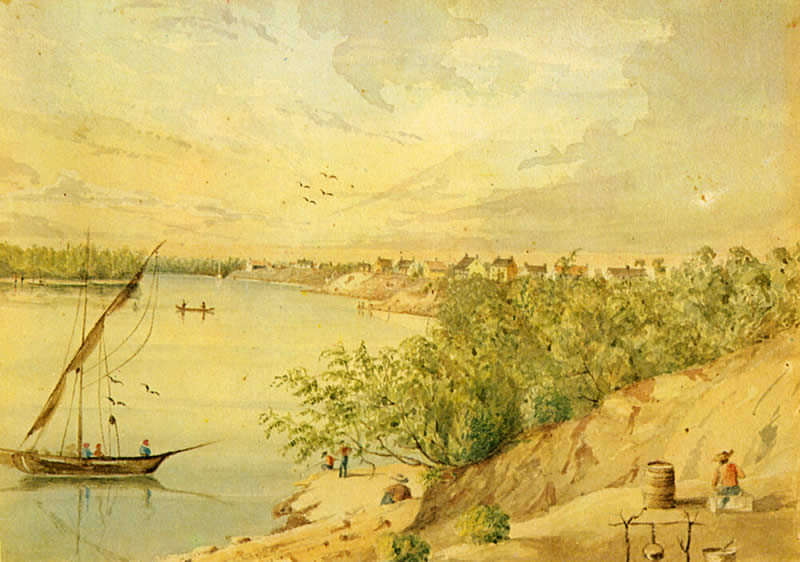
Rio Grande City, Rochester Historical Society, New York

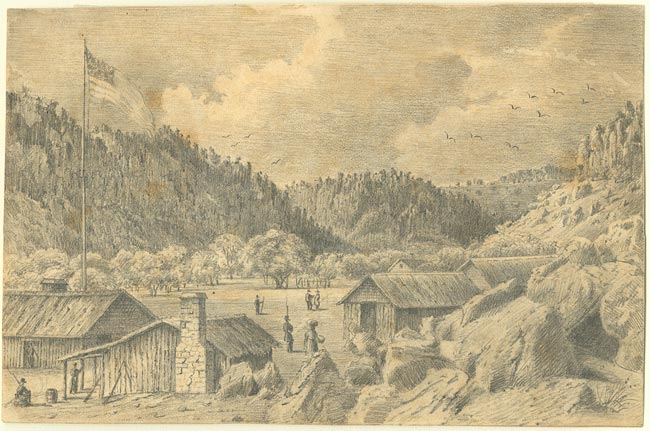
Fort Davis, pencil, Rochester Historical Society, New York

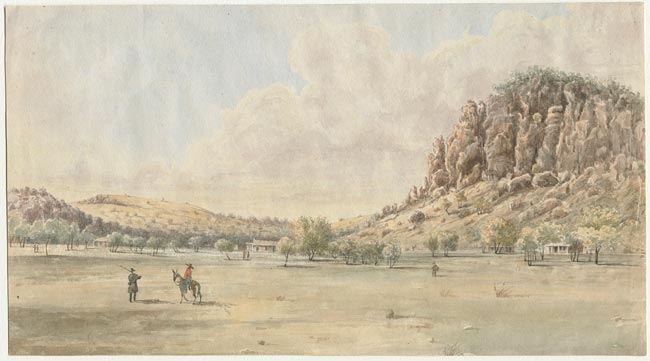
Fort Davis, watercolor, Rochester Historical Society, New York

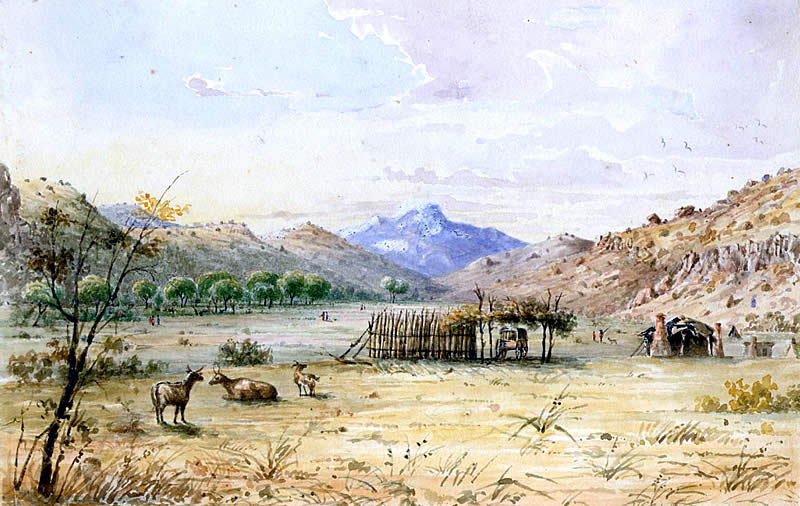
Overland Mail Station, Rochester Historical Society, New York

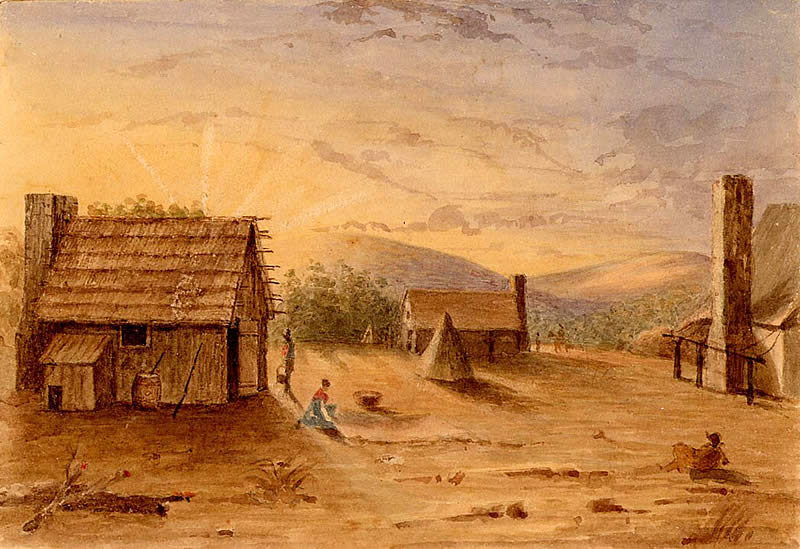
In Maggie's Kitchen, Rochester Historical Society

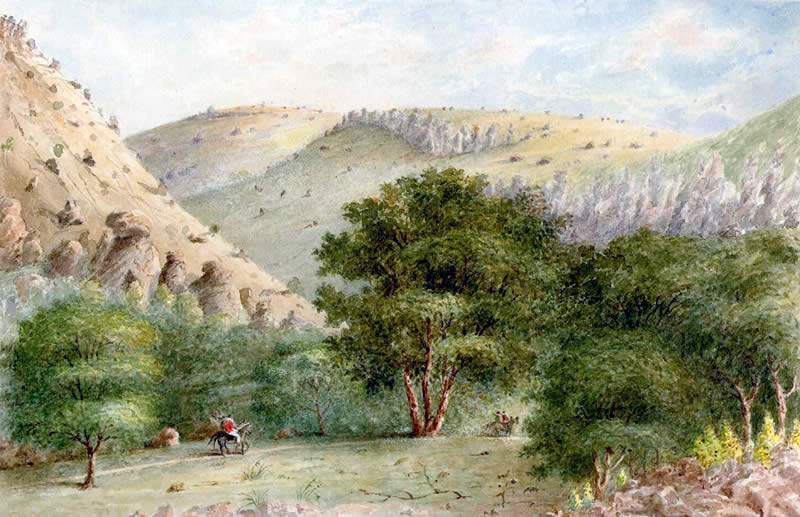
In Wild Rose Pass, Rochester Historical Society
