= Fort Quitman =

- Ghost Town
- Location within Texas Fort Quitman (the United States)
- Coordinates: 31°03′45″N 105°35′02″W
- Country: United States
- State: Texas
- County: Hudspeth
- U.S. Army Fort: September 28, 1858
- Elevation: 3,458 ft (1,054 m)
- Time zone: UTC-7 (Mountain (MST))
  - Summer (DST): UTC-6 (MDT)
- GNIS feature ID: 1379791

Fort Quitman was a United States Army installation on the Rio Grande in Texas, United States, south of present-day Sierra Blanca, 20 miles (32 km) southeast of McNary, in southern Hudspeth County. The fort, now a ghost town, was named for former Mississippi Governor John A. Quitman, who served as a major general under Zachary Taylor during the Mexican–American War.

In 1963, Recorded Historic Texas Landmark number 2007 was placed at the county courthouse, honoring Fort Quitman.

== Establishment ==
Fort Quitman was established on September 28, 1858, by units of the 8th Infantry Regiment. The first troops were under the command of Captain Arthur T. Lee and included 86 officers and men. Their mission was to protect the San Antonio–El Paso Road. It was a station on the route of the mail coaches of the San Antonio–San Diego Mail Line and later the Butterfield Overland Mail.

By 1860 the garrison had been reduced to one officer Second Lieutenant Zenas Bliss (who would retire from the Army in 1897 as a brigadier general) and 20 men. On the outbreak of the American Civil War, Texas joined the Confederacy. Lieutenant Bliss and his men were ordered to march to San Antonio with other troops evacuating West Texas garrisons. They believed they would be put on ships and sent to the North, but instead were captured and held as prisoners of war. Bliss was later exchanged and rose to the rank of colonel of volunteers. His promotion to general grade was probably hindered by his having been a prisoner of war. Confederate Texas troops under Brigadier General Henry Hopkins Sibley passed through the post on their way to the New Mexico Campaign in December 1861. The remnants of his army also passed by the post after their defeat. There is no evidence that Confederate troops ever permanently garrisoned the fort. The fort was inspected by troops from the California Column looking for any evidence of further Confederate activity or stragglers in 1863, but did not see any need to garrison the post.

The Fort was regarrisoned in January 1868 by Buffalo Soldiers of the 9th Cavalry Regiment and 42 Infantry under command of Major Albert Payson Morrow of the 9th Cavalry. Much of the post was in bad condition and was never fully restored. Soldiers would complain about adobe from the walls falling into their bunks as they slept due to the poor condition of the buildings. It has been stated, "No worse site for a military post could ever be conceived." It was all but totally isolated from civilization with mountain ranges running down both sides of the river. Any attempts at cultivating gardens to help with food supplies met with little success.

Expeditions against the Apache in the Sacramento Mountains were mounted from Fort Quitman, but they met with little success. Gradually the garrison was reduced to a single company of infantry. The last unit, Company B of the 25th Infantry Regiment, left in January 1877. The post itself was burned later that year by an angry mob from San Elizario during the San Elizario Salt War. The rioters destroyed it in protest of federal support of a rival faction. It was temporarily reoccupied as a sub-post of Fort Davis by troops from the 10th Cavalry Regiment from 1880 to 1882 during Victorio's War. The building of the Southern Pacific Railroad through the pass in the mountains north-west of the post, effectively by-passing it, eliminated the need for this post.
