= Fort Hancock Independent School District =

School district in Texas

Fort Hancock Independent School District is a public school district based in the community of Fort Hancock, Texas (USA).

It includes the communities of Fort Hancock and Acala.

== Schools ==
The district has three campuses:-

- Fort Hancock High School (Grades 9–12)
- Fort Hancock Middle School (Grades 5–8)
- Benito Martinez Elementary School (Grades K–4)

During the late 1980s and early 1990s Fort Hancock was a powerhouse in six-man football, winning five Texas state championships, including four straight (1986, 1988, 1989, 1990, and 1991) and were also the 1992 state runners-up. The number of titles and consecutive titles are state records in six-man football, and Fort Hancock's 4-peat was the first ever in UIL football history (in any classification) and one of only three instances (Sealy and Celina are the others).

In 2009, the school district was rated "academically acceptable" by the Texas Education Agency.
