= Hudspeth County, Texas =

County in Texas, United States

- County
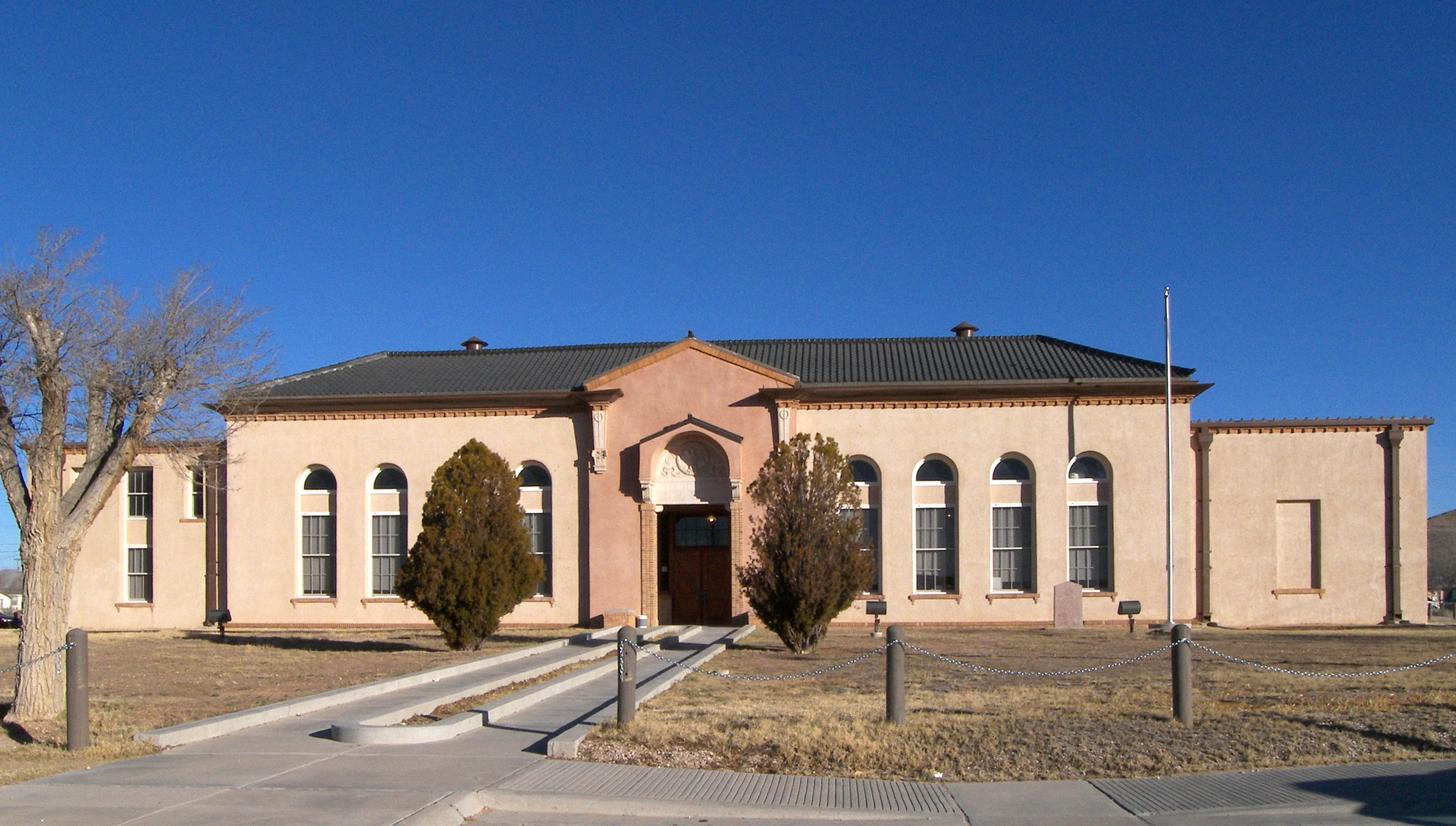
- Hudspeth County Courthouse in Sierra Blanca

- Location within the U.S. state of Texas
- Coordinates: 31°27′N 105°22′W
- Country: United States
- State: Texas
- Founded: 1917
- Named for: Claude B. Hudspeth
- Seat: Sierra Blanca
- Largest community: Fort Hancock

Area
  - Total: 4,572 sq mi (11,840 km^{2})
  - Land: 4,571 sq mi (11,840 km^{2})
  - Water: 0.8 sq mi (2.1 km^{2}) 0.02%

Population (2020)
  - Total: 3,202
  - Estimate (2025): 3,433 ▲
  - Density: 0.7/sq mi (0.27/km^{2})
- Time zone: UTC−7 (Mountain)
  - Summer (DST): UTC−6 (MDT)
- Congressional district: 23rd
- Website: www.co.hudspeth.tx.us

Hudspeth County is a county located in the U.S. state of Texas. As of the 2020 census, the population was 3,202. Its county seat is Sierra Blanca, and the largest community is Fort Hancock. The county is named for Claude Benton Hudspeth, a state senator and United States Representative from El Paso. It is northeast of the Mexico–U.S. border.

Hudspeth County is included in the El Paso metropolitan area. It is one of the nine counties that comprise the Trans-Pecos region of West Texas. Hudspeth County is one of two Texas counties to entirely observe Mountain Time, along with neighboring El Paso County, while Culberson County partly observes it (in the northwestern region, as the rest of the county observes Central Time).

== History ==
Prehistoric Jornada Mogollón peoples were practicing agriculture in the Rio Grande floodplain circa 900–1350 AD. These people left behind artifacts and pictographs as evidence of their presence.

The Rodriguez-Sanchez Expedition of 1581 encountered friendly Native Americans bestowing gifts upon the explorers. Antonio de Espejo's 1582–83 expedition encountered Otomoaco people in the county.

The Mescalero Apache frequented the area to irrigate their crops. In 1849, John Salmon "RIP" Ford explored the area between San Antonio and El Paso noting in his mapped report the productive land upon which the Mescalero Indians farmed. By the mid-17th century, the Mescaleros expanded their territory to the Plains Navajos and Pueblos from the Guadalupes, and El Paso del Norte. Their feared presence deterred white settlers. In January 1870, a group of soldiers attacked a Mescalero Apache village near Delaware Creek in the Guadalupe Mountains. In July 1880, soldiers at Tinaja de las Palmas attacked a group of Mescaleros led by Chief Victorio. In August 1880, buffalo soldiers ambushed Victorio at Rattlesnake Springs. Victorio retreated to Mexico and was killed in October by Mexican soldiers. Two weeks later, Apaches killed seven buffalo soldier, members of the famous black Tenth United States Cavalry.

The demand for new routes from Texas to California caused an uptick in explorations. The San Antonio-to-El Paso leg of the San Antonio-California Trail was surveyed in 1848 under the direction of John Coffee Hays. Hudspeth became known as a place travelers passed through, on their way to somewhere else. Fort Quitman was established in 1858 to provide protection for travelers.

Lt. Francis Theodore Bryan camped at Guadalupe Pass while exploring a route from San Antonio to El Paso via Fredericksburg. Upon reaching El Paso in July 1849, his report recommended sink wells along the route. In July 1848, Secretary of War William L. Marcy wanted a military post established on the north side of the Rio Grande. Major Jefferson Van Horne was sent out in 1849 to establish Marcy's goal.

John Russell Bartlett was commissioned in 1850 to carry out the Treaty of Guadalupe Hidalgo. Bartlett declared the Guadalupe Mountains dark and gloomy, and proposed a transcontinental railroad be built south of the peaks. Three years later, Captain John Pope was sent to scout out a railroad route, and in the succeeding year to search for artesian water supplies. Texas Commissioner Robert Simpson Neighbors was sent by Governor Peter Hansborough Bell in 1850 to organize El Paso.

The Butterfield Overland Mail and the San Antonio-San Diego Mail served the county from 1857 to 1861. These mail coaches provided a means for travelers to reach California in 27 days, if the passenger had the $200 for a one-way fare and was courageous enough to withstand the weather and dangers en route.

Men from San Elizario and the other villages along the Rio Grande near El Paso had become dependent on the salt trade for their livelihoods. After the Civil War, they broke a road from Fort Quitman to the Salt Basin in northeastern Hudspeth County, but Anglo politicians tried to capitalize on this trade by asserting ownership of the salt lakes and levying fees on the traders. The result was the 7-year San Elizario Salt War, which heightened tensions between Mexicans and Americans in the 1870s.

Rival railway companies began competing for rights of way. The Texas and Pacific Railway and the Galveston, Harrisburg and San Antonio Railway eventually reached an agreement to share the tracks, with a number of towns arising along the way

Hudspeth was formed in 1917 from El Paso County, Texas. Sierra Blanca was named the county seat, and has the only adobe courthouse in Texas.

From 1992 to 2002, the county accepted over 200 tons per day of treated, dried sewage from New York City. The waste was spread over a remote site in the county.

In recent times, Hudspeth County has become notorious as a location for frequent drug arrests for individuals traveling east on Interstate 10 from El Paso, due to the presence of a US Border Patrol checkpoint. Several celebrities, including touring musicians Willie Nelson, Snoop Dogg, and Fiona Apple, and actor Armie Hammer have been arrested on drug charges at this location.

== Geography ==
According to the U.S. Census Bureau, the county has a total area of 4,572 square miles (11,840 km^{2}), of which 4,571 square miles (11,840 km^{2}) are land and 0.8 square miles (2.1 km^{2}) (0.02%) is covered by water. It is the third largest county in Texas by land area. Part of Guadalupe Mountains National Park lies in the northeast corner of the county.

=== Major highways ===
- Interstate 10
  - I-10 BL (Sierra Blanca)
- U.S. Highway 62/U.S. Highway 180
- State Highway 20
- Spur 148

=== Adjacent counties and municipalities ===
- Otero County, New Mexico (north)
- Culberson County (east)
- Jeff Davis County (south)
- Presidio County (south)
- El Paso County (west)
- Guadalupe, Chihuahua, Mexico (south)
- Práxedis G. Guerrero, Chihuahua, Mexico (south)

=== Protected areas ===
- Guadalupe Mountains National Park
  - McKittrick Canyon

== Demographics ==
Historical population
Census	Pop.	Note	%±
1920	962		—
1930	3,728		287.5%
1940	3,149		−15.5%
1950	4,298		36.5%
1960	3,343		−22.2%
1970	2,392		−28.4%
1980	2,728		14.0%
1990	2,915		6.9%
2000	3,344		14.7%
2010	3,476		3.9%
2020	3,202		−7.9%
2025 (est.)	3,433	▲	7.2%
U.S. Decennial Census; 1850–2010 2010 2020

=== Racial and ethnic composition ===
Hudspeth County, Texas – Racial and ethnic composition Note: the US Census treats Hispanic/Latino as an ethnic category. This table excludes Latinos from the racial categories and assigns them to a separate category. Hispanics/Latinos may be of any race.
Race / Ethnicity (NH = Non-Hispanic)	Pop 1980	Pop 1990	Pop 2000	Pop 2010	Pop 2020	% 1980	% 1990	% 2000	% 2010	% 2020
White alone (NH)	1,114	956	770	628	1,094	40.84%	32.80%	23.03%	18.07%	34.17%
Black or African American alone (NH)	11	9	7	30	6	0.40%	0.31%	0.21%	0.86%	0.19%
Native American or Alaska Native alone (NH)	12	8	33	11	6	0.44%	0.27%	0.99%	0.32%	0.19%
Asian alone (NH)	2	2	4	13	10	0.07%	0.07%	0.12%	0.37%	0.31%
Native Hawaiian or Pacific Islander alone (NH)	x	x	0	0	0	x	x	0.00%	0.00%	0.00%
Other race alone (NH)	0	5	2	1	7	0.00%	0.17%	0.06%	0.03%	0.22%
Mixed race or Multiracial (NH)	x	x	19	25	43	x	x	0.57%	0.72%	1.34%
Hispanic or Latino (any race)	1,589	1,935	2,509	2,768	2,036	58.25%	66.38%	75.03%	79.63%	63.59%
Total	2,728	2,915	3,344	3,476	3,202	100.00%	100.00%	100.00%	100.00%	100.00%

=== 2020 census ===
As of the 2020 census, the county had a population of 3,202 and a median age of 35.8 years; 16.7% of residents were under the age of 18 and 14.6% were 65 years of age or older. For every 100 females there were 110.9 males, and for every 100 females age 18 and over there were 113.7 males age 18 and over.

The racial makeup of the county was 58.5% White, 0.5% Black or African American, 1.2% American Indian and Alaska Native, 0.3% Asian, <0.1% Native Hawaiian and Pacific Islander, 19.4% from some other race, and 20.0% from two or more races. Hispanic or Latino residents of any race comprised 63.6% of the population.

<0.1% of residents lived in urban areas, while 100.0% lived in rural areas.

There were 833 households in the county, of which 37.5% had children under the age of 18 living in them. Of all households, 52.2% were married-couple households, 19.9% were households with a male householder and no spouse or partner present, and 25.3% were households with a female householder and no spouse or partner present. About 24.6% of all households were made up of individuals and 14.5% had someone living alone who was 65 years of age or older. There were 1,107 housing units, of which 24.8% were vacant. Among occupied housing units, 76.0% were owner-occupied and 24.0% were renter-occupied. The homeowner vacancy rate was 3.7% and the rental vacancy rate was 3.3%.

=== 2010 census ===
As of the 2010 United States census, 3,476 people resided in the county. 78.8% were White, 1.4% Black or African American, 1.1% Native American, 0.5% Asian, 16.1% of some other race, and 2.2% of two or more races; 79.6% were Hispanic or Latino (of any race).

=== 2000 census ===
As of the 2000 census, 3,344 people, 1,092 households, and 841 families resided in the county. The population density was 0.7 people per square mile (0.27 people/km^{2}). The 1,471 housing units averaged 0.3 units per square mile (0.12/km^{2}). The racial makeup of the county was 87.23% White, 0.33% African American 1.41% Native American, 0.18% Asian, 8.76% from other races, and 2.09% from two or more races. About 75.03% of the population was Hispanic or Latino of any race.

Of the 1,092 households, 45.3% had children under the age of 18 living with them, 63% were married couples living together, 11.4% had a female householder with no husband present, and 22.9% were not families. About 21.1% of all households were made up of one person, and 8.3% had someone living alone who was 65 years of age or older. The average household size was 3.03 and the average family size was 3.56.

In the county, the population was distributed as with 34.1% under the age of 18, 8.9% from 18 to 24, 26.7% from 25 to 44, 20.4% from 45 to 64, and 9.9% who were 65 years of age or older. The median age was 30 years. For every 100 females there were 102.9 males. For every 100 females age 18 and over, there were 94.3 males.

The median income for a household in the county was $21,045, and for a family was $22,314. Males had a median income of $22,862 versus $18,594 for females. The per capita income for the county was $9,549. About 32.6% of families and 35.8% of the population were below the poverty line, including 41.3% of those under age 18 and 42.6% of those age 65 or over. The county's per capita income makes it one of the poorest counties in the United States.

== Education ==
Hudspeth County is served by four school districts. The Fort Hancock Independent School District, based in Fort Hancock, covers the western part of the county, along the El Paso County line from the Mexican border to the New Mexico state line. A strip along the Culberson County line in the eastern part of Hudspeth County, which includes Allamoore, is served by the Culberson County-Allamoore Independent School District based in Van Horn. Most of the northern part of the county is served by the Dell City Independent School District, based in Dell City. Most of the southern part of the county is served by the Sierra Blanca Independent School District, based in Sierra Blanca.

The former Allamoore ISD merged into Culberson County ISD in 1995.

According to statistics from January 2009, 52% of Hudspeth County adults were illiterate in English.

All of the county is in the service area of El Paso Community College.

== Communities ==
=== City ===
- Dell City

=== Census-designated places ===
- Acala
- Fort Hancock
- Sierra Blanca (county seat)

=== Unincorporated communities ===
- Allamoore
- Cornudas
- Desert Haven
- Esperanza
- McNary

=== Ghost towns ===
- Acala
- Birchville
- Etholen
- Finlay
- Fort Quitman
- Salt Flat

== Politics ==
Hudspeth County is located within District 74 of the Texas House of Representatives. Hudspeth County is located within District 29 of the Texas Senate.

United States presidential election results for Hudspeth County, Texas
Year	Republican		Democratic		Third party(ies)	
Year	No.	%	No.	%	No.	%
1920	37	27.41%	97	71.85%	1	0.74%
1924	34	23.94%	84	59.15%	24	16.90%
1928	123	51.25%	117	48.75%	0	0.00%
1932	31	8.31%	341	91.42%	1	0.27%
1936	24	6.19%	363	93.56%	1	0.26%
1940	54	11.23%	426	88.57%	1	0.21%
1944	35	8.84%	333	84.09%	28	7.07%
1948	49	9.84%	437	87.75%	12	2.41%
1952	355	57.07%	262	42.12%	5	0.80%
1956	316	45.66%	368	53.18%	8	1.16%
1960	267	38.98%	409	59.71%	9	1.31%
1964	224	33.68%	438	65.86%	3	0.45%
1968	285	40.31%	289	40.88%	133	18.81%
1972	467	64.24%	250	34.39%	10	1.38%
1976	395	44.84%	479	54.37%	7	0.79%
1980	471	53.28%	394	44.57%	19	2.15%
1984	557	60.35%	362	39.22%	4	0.43%
1988	405	49.63%	406	49.75%	5	0.61%
1992	325	37.40%	364	41.89%	180	20.71%
1996	367	40.87%	427	47.55%	104	11.58%
2000	514	55.75%	380	41.21%	28	3.04%
2004	577	65.12%	302	34.09%	7	0.79%
2008	458	51.00%	430	47.88%	10	1.11%
2012	471	54.58%	379	43.92%	13	1.51%
2016	503	57.75%	324	37.20%	44	5.05%
2020	779	66.87%	371	31.85%	15	1.29%
2024	759	73.12%	275	26.49%	4	0.39%

United States Senate election results for Hudspeth County, Texas1
Year	Republican		Democratic		Third party(ies)	
Year	No.	%	No.	%	No.	%
2024	702	68.82%	285	27.94%	33	3.24%

United States Senate election results for Hudspeth County, Texas2
Year	Republican		Democratic		Third party(ies)	
Year	No.	%	No.	%	No.	%
2020	680	61.76%	383	34.79%	38	3.45%

Texas Gubernatorial election results for Hudspeth County
Year	Republican		Democratic		Third party(ies)	
Year	No.	%	No.	%	No.	%
2022	606	66.89%	270	29.80%	30	3.31%

== See also ==
- National Register of Historic Places listings in Hudspeth County, Texas
- Recorded Texas historic landmarks in Hudspeth County
- No Country for Old Men
