= Sierra Blanca, Texas =

- County Seat and Unincorporated community
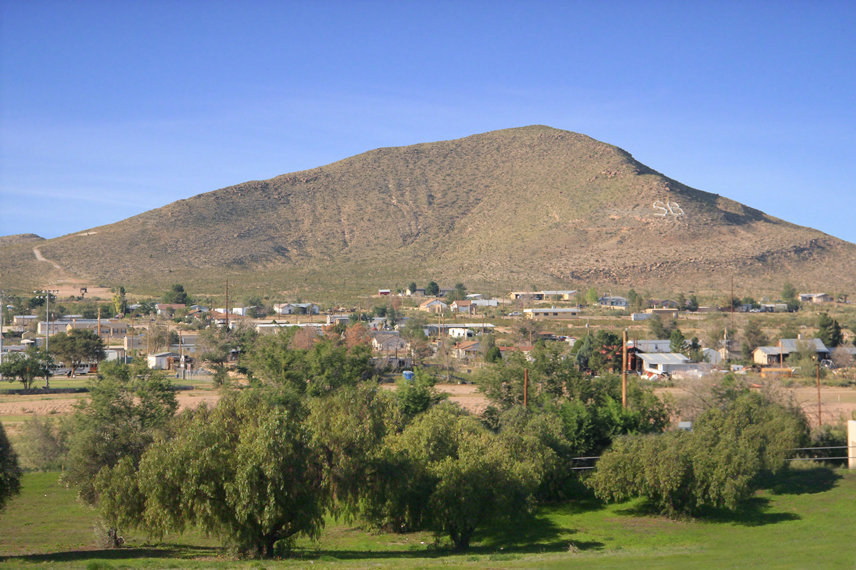
- Sierra Blanca with "SB" on mountain in the background

- Coordinates: 31°11′00″N 105°20′22″W
- Country: United States
- State: Texas
- County: Hudspeth

Area
  - Total: 4.8 sq mi (12.4 km^{2})
  - Land: 4.7 sq mi (12.3 km^{2})
  - Water: 0.039 sq mi (0.1 km^{2})
- Elevation: 4,479 ft (1,365 m)

Population (2020)
  - Total: 315
  - Density: 66.2/sq mi (25.6/km^{2})
- Time zone: UTC-7 (Mountain (MST))
  - Summer (DST): UTC-6 (MDT)
- ZIP code: 79851
- Area code: 915
- FIPS code: 48-67772
- GNIS feature ID: 2408735

Sierra Blanca is a census-designated place (CDP) and the county seat of Hudspeth County, Texas, United States. The town is part of the Trans-Pecos region of far West Texas, is located northeast of the Mexican border and is within the Mountain Time Zone. As of the 2020 census, its population was 315.

The town accommodates travelers between Van Horn and El Paso along Interstate 10, which is the main route that connects Texas from west to southeast. The town was named for the nearby Sierra Blanca Mountain, which was in turn named for the white poppies that grew there (sierra blanca is Spanish for "white mountain"). The letters "SB" can be seen on a nearby mountain from Interstate 10.

== History ==
The town was founded in 1881 at the completion point of a southern transcontinental railway. Sierra Blanca has served as the junction of the Southern Pacific and Texas and Pacific railroads. Hudspeth County was formed in 1917 from El Paso County. Sierra Blanca was named the county seat, and has the only adobe courthouse in Texas.

== Geography ==
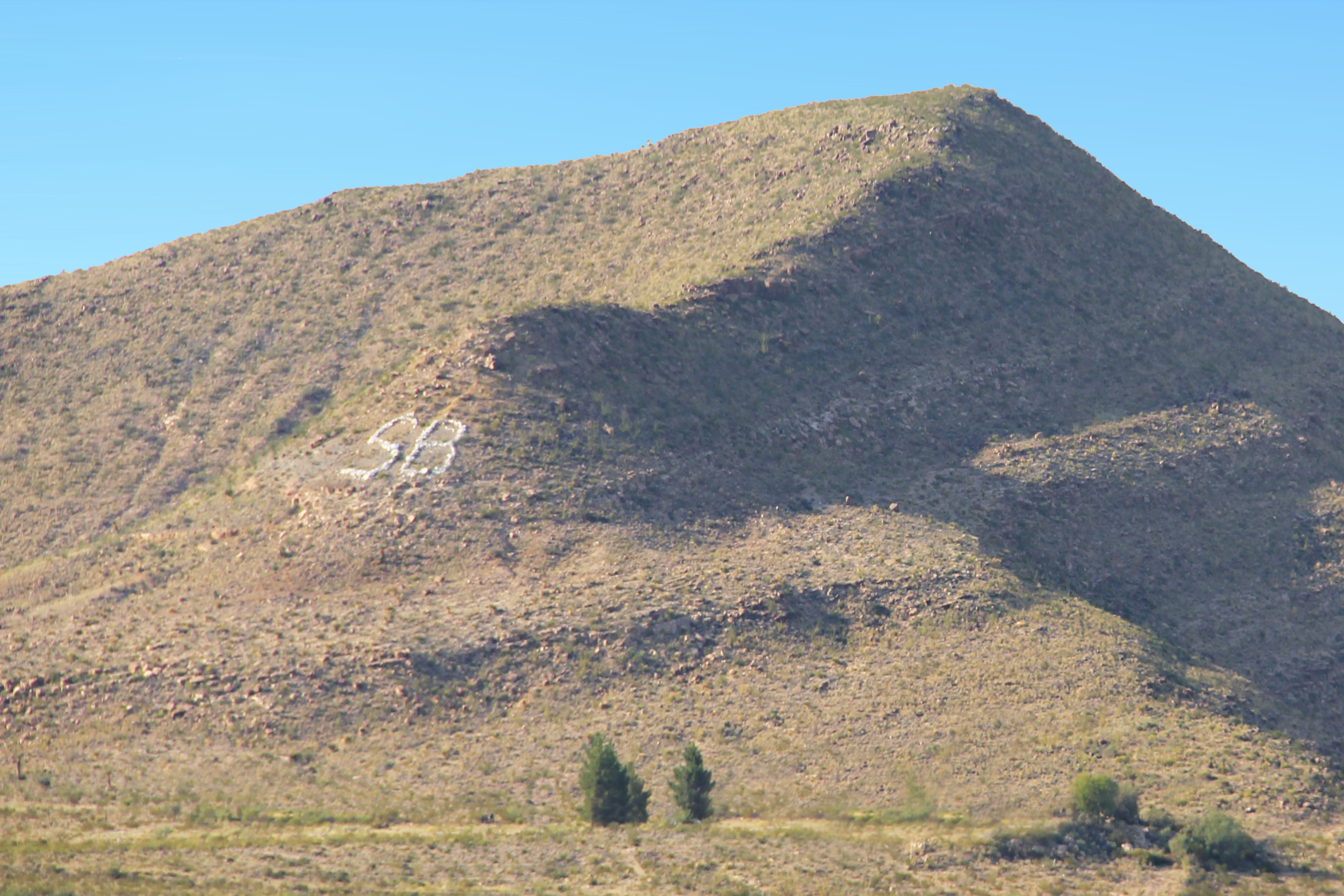
Sierra Blanca (White Mountain)

Sierra Blanca is found in Far West Texas, a subdivision of West Texas, and is 4,520 feet (1,380 m) above sea level. The town is part of the Trans-Pecos region within the most mountainous and arid portion of Texas. The town is located in Hudspeth County, which is large and sparsely populated. Sierra Blanca (White Mountain), at an elevation of 6,892 feet (2,101 m) above sea level, towers over the town to the northwest and is the most prominent mountain peak of the surrounding mountainous terrain.

According to the United States Census Bureau, the CDP has a total area of 4.8 square miles (12.4 km^{2}), of which 4.7 square miles (12.3 km^{2}) are land and 0.04 square miles (0.1 km^{2}), or 0.5%, is covered by water. Soil in the surrounding area is mostly nonarable due to lack of water, so cannot sustain large-scale farming. Due to the high altitude of the town, it has a cooler climate than other areas of the Chihuahuan Desert.

=== Climate ===
Summers are hot with mild nights. The town occasionally experiences high winds and dust storms. July is normally the warmest month, with the highest recorded temperature in town being 109 °F (43 °C) in 1994. During the winter, the jet stream periodically dips far south and brings extremely low temperatures. December is usually the coolest month and the lowest temperature recorded was −10 °F (−23 °C) in 1985.

Normally, the town receives less than 1 inch (25 mm) of snow annually. During the hurricane season, tropical storms can sometimes bring large amounts of precipitation to the arid mountainous region and can cause flash flooding. Precipitation is low; the town and vicinity receive an average of 11.24 inches (285 mm) of precipitation annually, with 45 days having rain.

Climate data for Sierra Blanca 2 E, Texas, 1981-2010 normals, extremes 1893-2002
Month	Jan	Feb	Mar	Apr	May	Jun	Jul	Aug	Sep	Oct	Nov	Dec	Year
Record high °F (°C)	77 (25)	89 (32)	89 (32)	96 (36)	103 (39)	109 (43)	108 (42)	102 (39)	99 (37)	94 (34)	89 (32)	88 (31)	109 (43)
Mean daily maximum °F (°C)	57.9 (14.4)	63.0 (17.2)	69.4 (20.8)	77.9 (25.5)	86.9 (30.5)	94.1 (34.5)	92.5 (33.6)	90.1 (32.3)	86.5 (30.3)	78.3 (25.7)	66.9 (19.4)	57.8 (14.3)	76.8 (24.9)
Mean daily minimum °F (°C)	25.7 (−3.5)	28.8 (−1.8)	35.2 (1.8)	42.6 (5.9)	52.3 (11.3)	60.6 (15.9)	63.5 (17.5)	62.0 (16.7)	55.9 (13.3)	44.1 (6.7)	33.2 (0.7)	25.6 (−3.6)	44.1 (6.7)
Record low °F (°C)	4 (−16)	−10 (−23)	6 (−14)	19 (−7)	26 (−3)	40 (4)	50 (10)	49 (9)	36 (2)	19 (−7)	7 (−14)	1 (−17)	−10 (−23)
Average precipitation inches (mm)	0.40 (10)	0.65 (17)	0.30 (7.6)	0.33 (8.4)	0.52 (13)	1.13 (29)	2.13 (54)	2.15 (55)	1.45 (37)	1.15 (29)	0.41 (10)	0.62 (16)	11.24 (286)
Average precipitation days (≥ 0.01 in)	3.2	2.6	2.0	1.6	2.5	4.5	6.4	7.3	5.1	3.9	2.7	3.3	45.1
Source 1: NOAA (normals)
Source 2: Western Regional Climate Center (extremes)

== Demographics ==
Historical population
Census	Pop.	Note	%±
2000	533		—
2010	553		3.8%
2020	315		−43.0%
U.S. Decennial Census; 1850–1900 1910; 1920 1930 1940; 1950 1960 1970; 1980 1990 2000; 2010

Sierra Blanca first appeared as a census designated place in the 2000 U.S. census.

=== 2020 census ===
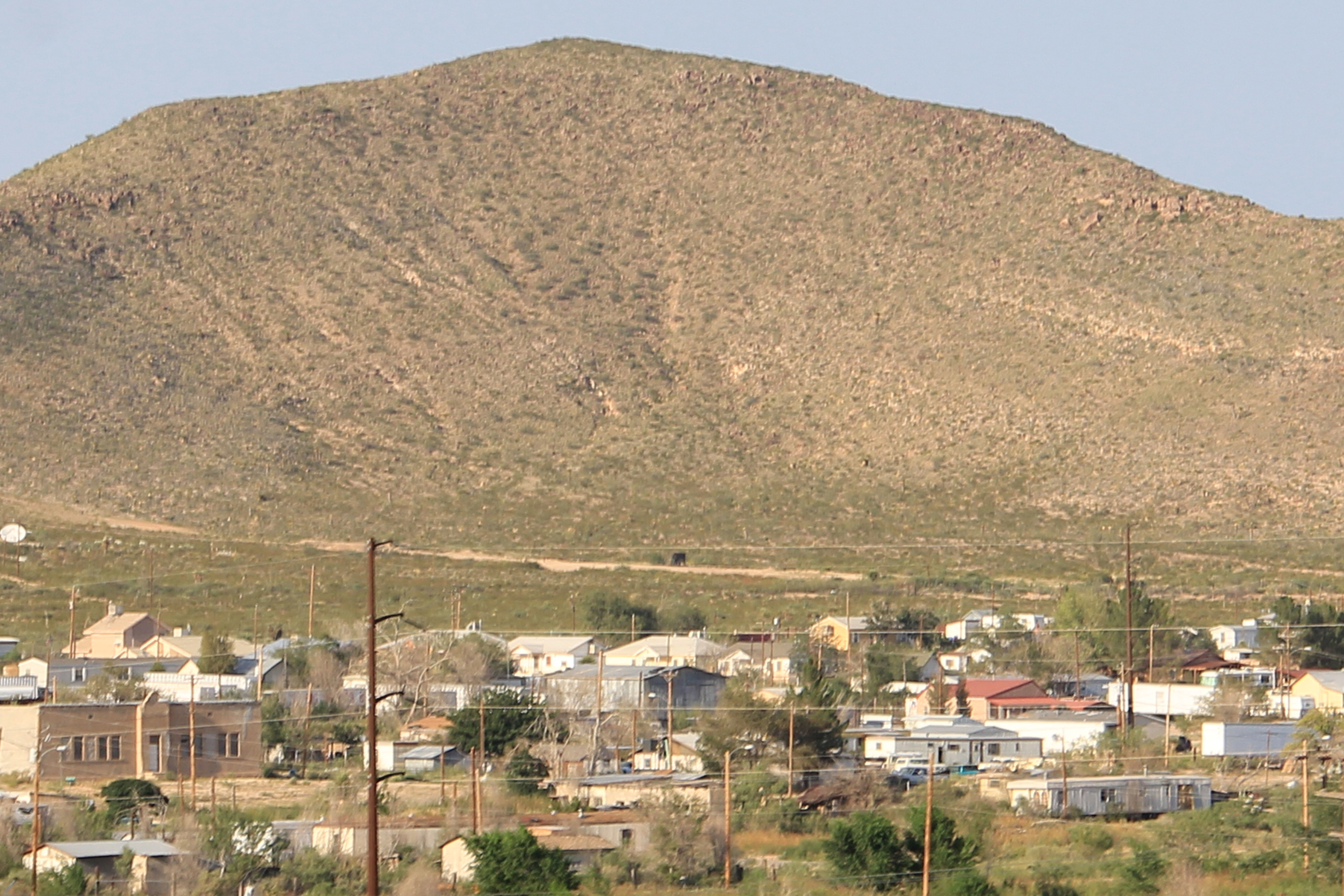
Sierra Blanca Downtown

Sierra Blanca CDP, Texas – Racial and ethnic composition Note: the US Census treats Hispanic/Latino as an ethnic category. This table excludes Latinos from the racial categories and assigns them to a separate category. Hispanics/Latinos may be of any race.
Race / Ethnicity (NH = Non-Hispanic)	Pop 2000	Pop 2010	Pop 2020	% 2000	% 2010	% 2020
White alone (NH)	134	119	92	25.14%	21.52%	29.21%
Black or African American alone (NH)	0	16	1	0.00%	2.89%	0.32%
Native American or Alaska Native alone (NH)	9	3	1	1.69%	0.54%	0.32%
Asian alone (NH)	1	8	7	0.19%	1.45%	2.22%
Native Hawaiian or Pacific Islander alone (NH)	0	0	0	0.00%	0.00%	0.00%
Other race alone (NH)	0	0	0	0.00%	0.00%	0.00%
Mixed race or Multiracial (NH)	2	3	5	0.38%	0.54%	1.59%
Hispanic or Latino (any race)	387	404	209	72.61%	73.06%	66.35%
Total	533	553	315	100.00%	100.00%	100.00%

As of the 2020 United States census, there were 315 people, 114 households, and 84 families residing in the CDP.

=== 2010 census ===
As of the 2010 census, 553 people, 172 households, and 126 families were residing in the CDP. The population density was 116.0 people/sq mi (50.6/km^{2}). The 227 housing units averaged 55.8/sq mi (21.5/km^{2}). The racial makeup of the CDP was 83.91% White, 3.44% Native American, 3.25% Black, 1.45% Asian, 7.96% from other races, and 3.56% from two or more races. Latinos of any race were 72.61% of the population.

Of the 172 households, 40.2% had children under 18 living with them, 45.72% were married couples living together, 13.0% had a female householder with no husband present, and 31.0% were not families. About 28.3% of all households were made up of individuals, and 11.4% had someone living alone who was 65 or older. The average household size was 2.63, and the average family size was 3.31.

In the CDP, theage distribution was 29.8% under 18, 11.8% from 18 to 24, 30.8% from 25 to 44, 18.4% from 45 to 64, and 9.2% who were 65 or older. The median age was 34.3 years. For every 100 females, there were 96.0 males. For every 100 females age 18 and over, there were 101.1 males. The median income for a household in the CDP was $32,464. The per capita income for the CDP was $14,682. About 19.6% of families and 22.5% of the population were below the poverty line, including 28.3% of those under age 18 and 32.6% of those age 65 or over.

== Education ==
Sierra Blanca is served by the Sierra Blanca Independent School District; it spends an annual average of $6,343 per student. On average, the schools have 10.9 students per teacher. For the demographic group older than 25 years, 68.6% have a high school degree, 3.2% have a bachelor's degree, and 2.6% have a graduate degree.

Hudspeth County is in the official service area of El Paso Community College.

== Transportation ==
Sierra Blanca is located on Interstate 10, 33 miles (53 km) west of Van Horn, and 87 miles (140 km) east of El Paso.

Amtrak’s Sunset Limited passes through the town on Union Pacific tracks, but makes no stop. The nearest stop is located in El Paso.

== Economy ==
The cost of living in Sierra Blanca is about 20% less than the US average. The CDP has a home ownership rate of 49.5%. The median home is valued at $54,600 with a 1.94% annual appreciation.

Starting in 1992, a few miles from Sierra Blanca was the location of a sludge dump that received 250 tons of treated sewage each day by train from New York City. The practice was discontinued in 2001, after local complaints about odor and negative impact on health.

In the late 1990s, the Texas Low-Level Radioactive Waste Disposal Authority proposed a nuclear waste site near Sierra Blanca. The proposal was met with push back. The waste site was thought to bring an economic boost to the town. This proposal was eventually declined, citing concerns about the site being in the most seismically active region of Texas.

Press reports indicated that in 2013, the town supported three restaurants and a motel. No grocery store is in the community.

== Law enforcement ==
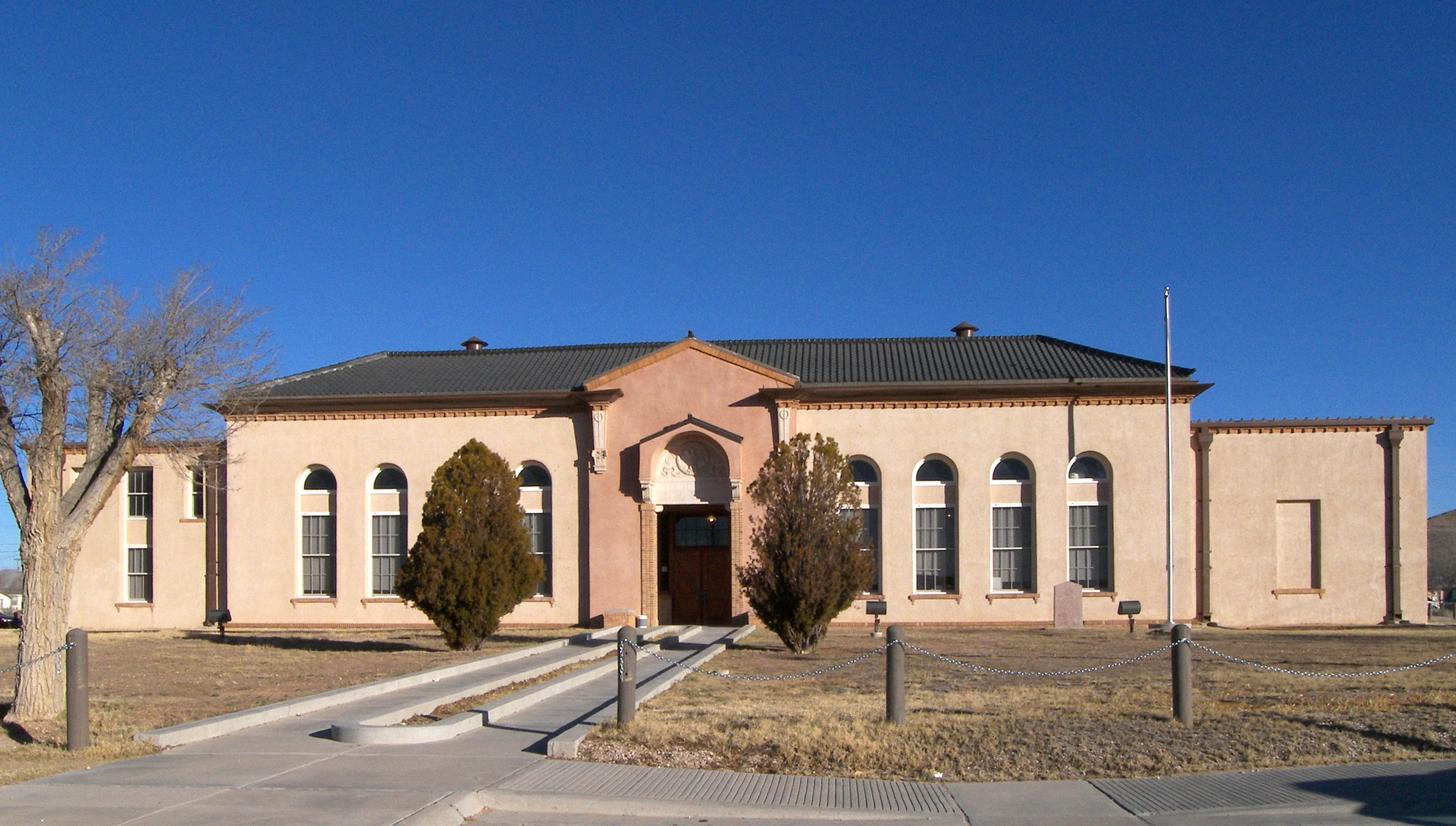
Hudspeth County Courthouse

In September 2012, singer Fiona Apple was arrested at a checkpoint for possession of small amounts of marijuana and hashish, and spent the night in jail there. A few weeks later, a Nelly tour bus was stopped at the same checkpoint, and 10 lb of marijuana were found on the bus along with heroin and a loaded gun. The singer was not arrested, but a member of his entourage was. Previously, rapper Snoop Dogg, musician Willie Nelson, and actor Armie Hammer had all been arrested separately for drug possession in Sierra Blanca. The United States Border Patrol checkpoint at Sierra Blanca sends the county thousands of drug cases a year and inspects 15,000 to 20,000 vehicles every day. The county is unable to prosecute the vast majority of these cases, as the federal government no longer funds such activities.
