= Horn (surname) =

Horn is a surname. Notable people with the surname include:

== Entertainment ==
=== Acting ===
- Cody Horn (born 1988), American actress and model
- Dimitris Horn (1921–1998), Greek actor
- Kaniehtiio Horn (born 1986), Canadian actress
- Kate Horn (1826–1896), Canadian stage actress and director
- Michelle Horn (born 1987), American actress

=== Music ===
- Charles Edward Horn (1786–1849), English composer
- Guildo Horn (born 1963), German singer
- Jana Horn, American folk musician
- Jim Horn (born 1940), American musician
- Karl Friedrich Horn (1762–1830), English composer
- Lawrence Horn (died 2017), American record producer
- Michael "J" Horn (born 1979), American musician and musical director
- Paul Horn (musician) (1930–2014), American jazz flautist and saxophonist
- Shirley Horn (1934–2005), American jazz singer and musician
- Trevor Horn (born 1949), British musician

=== Writing ===
- Frederik Winkel Horn (1845–1898), Danish writer and translator
- Frederik Winkel-Horn (1756–1837), Danish writer
- Marion Horn (born 1965), German journalist
- Shifra Horn (born 1951), Israeli author

=== Other ===
- Alan F. Horn (born 1943), American entertainment industry executive
- Andrew Horn (filmmaker) (1952–2019), American film producer, director and writer
- Bob Horn (broadcaster) (1916–1966), American radio and television personality
- Dara Horn (born 1977), American novelist, essayist, and professor of literature
- Greg Horn, American comic book artist
- Milton Horn (1906–1995), Russian-American sculptor
- Rebecca Horn (1944–2024), German visual artist
- Roni Horn (born 1955), American visual artist and writer
- Roy Horn (1944–2020), German-American entertainer

== Military ==
- Carl von Horn (1847–1923), Bavarian general and War Minister
- Carl von Horn (1903–1989), Swedish general
- Evert Horn (1585–1615), Swedish field marshal
- Gustav Horn, Count of Pori (1592–1657), Swedish soldier and politician
- Spencer B. Horn (1895–1969), British soldier and World War I flying ace

== Politics ==
- Andrew Horn (c. 1275–1328), English fishmonger, lawyer and legal scholar who served as Chamberlain of London (1320–1328)
- Count Arvid Horn (1664–1742), Swedish general, diplomat and politician
- Erwin Horn (1929-2006), German politician
- Frederick W. Horn (1815–1893), Prussian-born American lawyer and politician in Wisconsin
- Gyula Horn (1932–2013), Prime Minister of Hungary from 1994 to 1998
- Joan Kelly Horn (born 1936), American politician from Missouri
- Kendra Horn, (born 1976), American lawyer and politician in Oklahoma
- Peter Horn (1891–1967), German politician
- Steve Horn (1931–2011), American politician in California and university president
- Werner D. Horn, German-born American politician in New Hampshire

== Science and education ==
- Alfred Horn (1918–2001), American mathematician
- Anton Ludwig Ernst Horn (1774–1848), German physician
- David Bayne Horn (1901–1969), British historian
- Gabriel Horn (1927–2012), British biologist
- George Henry Horn (1840–1897), American entomologist
- Joseph M. Horn (born 1940), American psychologist
- Laurence R. Horn (born 1945), American linguist
- Michiel Horn (born 1939), Canadian historian
- Paul Horn (computer scientist) (born 1946), American computer scientist and solid state physicist
- Sally P. Horn (born 1958), American geographer
- Siegfried Horn (1908–1993), American archaeologist and Bible scholar
- Wade Horn (born 1976), American psychologist
- Walter Horn (1908–1995), German-born American academic
- Walther Hermann Richard Horn (1871–1939), German entomologist

== Sports ==
=== American football (gridiron) ===
- Don Horn (born 1945), American football player
- Jaycee Horn (born 1999), American football player
- Jimmy Horn Jr. (born 2002), American football player
- Joe Horn (born 1972), American football player
- Joe Horn Jr. (born 1994), American football player, son of Joe Horn
- Sam Horn (American football) (born 2003), American football and baseball player

=== Association football (soccer) ===
- Timo Horn (born 1993), German footballer
- Tor Egil Horn (born 1976), Norwegian footballer

=== Baseball ===
- Bailey Horn (born 1998), American baseball player
- Sam Horn (born 1963), American baseball player

=== Combat sports ===
- Harvey Horn (born 1995), British boxer
- Jeff Horn (born 1988), Australian boxer
- Jeremy Horn (born 1975), American mixed martial artist

=== Other ===
- Blair Horn (born 1961), Canadian rower
- Marie-Louise Horn (1912–1991), German tennis player
- Oliver Horn (1901–1960), American water polo player
- Philipp Horn (born 1994), German biathlete
- Rudolf Horn (born 1954), Austrian biathlete and cross-country skier
- Stefanie Horn (born 1991), Italian slalom canoeist
- Siegbert Horn (1950–2016), East German slalom canoeist
- Ted Horn (1919–1948), American race car driver

== Other ==
- Alfred Aloysius "Trader" Horn (1861–1931), trader in Africa during the "Scramble for Africa"
- Brita Horn (1745–1791), Swedish courtier and letter writer
- Bruce Horn (born 1960), American programmer
- Hassa Horn Jr. (1873–1968), Norwegian engineer and industrialist
- Julian Horn-Smith (born 1948), British businessman
- Mike Horn (born 1966), Swiss explorer and adventurer
- Rosa Horn (1880–1976), American preacher and church leader
- Tom Horn (1860–1903), American scout and Old West figure
- William Horn (1841–1922), Australian mining magnate and philanthropist

== Families ==
- Horn family, Swedish nobility since the 14th century
- House of Hornes, European noble family in Spain and Austria (extinct 1826)

== Fictional characters ==
- Corran Horn, character in Star Wars Legends and narrator of I, Jedi

== See also ==
- Hoorn (disambiguation)
- Horn (disambiguation)
- Horne (surname)
- Van Horn (disambiguation)
