= Horne =

Horne may refer to:

== Places ==
- Horn, Netherlands, the village of Horn or Horne in the Netherlands
- Horne, Faaborg-Midtfyn, a village in Faaborg-Midtfyn Municipality on the island of Funen, Denmark
- Horne, Hjørring Municipality, a village in Hjørring Municipality, Denmark
  - Horne railway station
- County of Horne, historic county from the Holy Roman Empire, located in what today is Netherlands and Belgium
- Horne, Surrey, England, United Kingdom

== Other uses ==
- Horne (surname)
- Horne, a Moogle from Final Fantasy XII

== See also ==
- Joseph Horne Company, a chain of Pittsburgh, Pennsylvania, United States-based department stores
- Horn (disambiguation)
- Van Horne (disambiguation)
