= Van Horn =

Van Horn may refer to:

== People ==
- Arthur W. Van Horn (1860–1931), American architect
- Bruce Van Horn, American poker player
- Buddy Van Horn (1929–2021), American stuntman and film director
- Burt Van Horn (1823–1896), U.S. Representative from New York
- Carl Van Horn, American auto racer
- Christian Van Horn (born 1978), American opera singer and Richard Tucker Award winner
- Darrin Van Horn (born 1968), American boxer
- Dave van Horn (born 1960), American baseball coach
- Doug Van Horn (born 1944), American football player who was an offensive lineman in the National Football League
- George Van Horn (1850–1904), U.S. Representative from New York
- Keith Van Horn (born 1975), American basketball player
- Lucretia Van Horn (1882–1970), American artist
- Nicholas van Hoorn, Dutch pirate
- Noel Van Horn (born 1968), American comics artist and writer for Disney comics, son of William Van Horn
- Patrick Van Horn (born 1969), American actor
- Richard L. Van Horn (born 1932), American academic
- Robert T. Van Horn (1824–1916), American newspaper publisher, politician
- Russell van Horn (1885–1970), American boxer
- Welby Van Horn (1920–2014), American tennis player and coach
- William Van Horn (born 1939), American comics artist and writer for Disney comics, father of Noel Van Horn

== Fictional places ==
- Van Horn, a town in Red Dead Redemption 2

== Places in the United States ==
- Van Horn, Texas
- Van Horn, Washington
- Van Horn High School (Missouri)
- Van Horn High School (Texas)
- South Van Horn, Alaska, a census-designated place
  - Van Horn Road

== See also ==
- Van Hoorn (surname)
- Van Horne (disambiguation)
- Van der Hoorn, a surname
- Van Horn House (disambiguation), historic houses
