= Horns =

Horns or The Horns may refer to:

- Plural of Horn (anatomy)
- Plural of Horn (instrument), a group of musical instruments all with a horn-shaped bells
- The Horns (Colorado), a summit on Cheyenne Mountain
- Horns (novel), a dark fantasy novel written in 2010 by Joe Hill
  - Horns (film), a 2013 film adaptation of Hill's novel
- "The Horns" (song), a 2015 song by DJ Katch
- "Horns" (song), by Gossip from the 2012 album A Joyful Noise
- "Horns" (Northern Exposure), a 1995 television episode
- The Horns, Bull's Green, a pub in Hertfordshire, England
- Texas Longhorns, the sports teams of the University of Texas in Austin; sometimes shortened to "Horns"
- Steve Took's Horns, an English rock band of the 1970s

== See also ==
- Horn (disambiguation)
- Sign of the horns, a vulgar hand gesture
