= Van Hoorn =

Van Hoorn is a Dutch toponymic surname. The place of origin often is the city of Hoorn in North Holland, but may be any of four other Dutch settlements named Hoorn, three named Den Hoorn, or Horn/the county of Horne in Dutch Limburg. Notable people with the surname include:

- Andries van Hoorn (1600–aft.1660), Dutch mayor of Haarlem portrayed by Frans Hals
- Arnold II van Hoorn, misspelling of Arnold van Horne (1339–1389), Dutch bishop
- Hugoline van Hoorn (born 1970), Dutch squash player
- Jan Janszoon van Hoorn (fl. 1630s), Dutch privateer
- Joan van Hoorn (1653–1711), Dutch Governor-General of the Dutch East Indie 1704–09
- Netty van Hoorn (born 1951), Dutch film director
- Nicholas van Hoorn (1635–1683), Dutch pirate
- Nicolaas van Hoorn (1904–1946), Dutch olympic fencer
- Graaf van Hoorn may refer to Philip de Montmorency, Count of Horn
- Marielle Blanchier (born 1968), née van Hoorn, Franco-Dutch writer

== See also ==
- 't Wapen van Hoorn, a 17th-century Dutch East India Company sailing ship
- Van Horne (disambiguation)
- Van Horn (disambiguation)
- Van der Hoorn, Dutch surname
