= Allamoore, Texas =

- Unincorporated community
- Location within Texas Location within the United States
- Coordinates: 31°04′40″N 105°00′08″W
- Country: United States
- State: Texas
- County: Hudspeth
- Elevation: 4,551 ft (1,387 m)
- Time zone: UTC-7 (Mountain (MST))
  - Summer (DST): UTC-6 (MDT)
- GNIS feature ID: 1380817

Allamoore (sometimes spelled Allamore) is a small unincorporated community in Hudspeth County, Texas, United States. It is located just north of Interstate 10, approximately 22 miles (35 km) southeast of Sierra Blanca and 11 miles (18 km) west of Van Horn.

== History ==
First settled in the 1880s, a post office was established in the area under the name Acme in 1884. It was closed two years later. A new post office opened in 1888 under the name Allamoore after the first postmistress, Alla R. Moore. It closed in 1895 only to open two years later under the same name.

Throughout its history, Allamoore has remained a sparsely populated ranching community. The population stood at 10 in 1914 and rose to 25 by the mid-1920s. Just prior to the Great Depression, that figure grew to 75. In the mid-1930s, the population was estimated at 25. Seventy pupils from the surrounding ranches attended Allamoore School. Allamoore experienced another increase in the mid-1940s, which lasted for around 20 years before the community went into permanent decline.

As of 2000, approximately 25 people reside in the Allamoore area. It is also one of the few cities in Texas that is in the Mountain Time Zone along with El Paso.

== Education ==
By the 1988–89 school year, the 2,100-square-mile (5,400 km^{2}) Allamoore Consolidated Independent School District (renamed the Allamoore Independent School District in 1992) had a total enrollment of eight students – the smallest enrollment in Texas. On July 1, 1995, Allamoore ISD consolidated with the Culberson County Independent School District based in nearby Van Horn to form the Culberson County-Allamoore Independent School District.

All of the county is in the service area of El Paso Community College.
