= Horn =

Horn may refer to:

== Common uses ==
- Horn (acoustic), a tapered sound guide
  - Horn antenna
  - Horn loudspeaker
  - Vehicle horn
  - Train horn
- Horn (anatomy), a pointed, bony projection on the head of various animals
- Horn (instrument), a family of musical instruments
  - French horn, often simply called a horn

== Arts and entertainment ==
- Horn (album), by Apink, 2022
- Horn, a 2011 album by Pharaoh Overlord
- "The Horn", a song by Super Furry Animals from the 2005 album Love Kraft
- "The Horn", a comedy track from the 1978 album Derek and Clive Ad Nauseam
- Horn (video game), 2012

== Places ==
- Horn of Africa
- Horn District, Austria
  - Horn, Austria
- Horn (am Bodensee), Baden-Württemberg, Germany
- Horn, Hamburg, Germany
- Horn Island (Mississippi), United States
- Horn, Nebraska, United States
- Horn, Netherlands
- Horn Island, Queensland, Australia
- Horn, a ferry docking point on Randsfjorden, Norway
- Horn, Rhineland-Palatinate, Germany
- Horn River, Northwest Territories, Canada
- Horn, Rutland, England
- Horn (Schwarzbach), a river in eastern France and southwestern Germany
- Horn, Sweden
- Horn, Switzerland
- The Horn (Antarctica), a hill on Eagle Island, Graham Land, Antarctica
- The Horn (Mount Buffalo), a peak in Victoria, Australia
- The Horn (New Hampshire), a peak in the United States
- The Horns, Bull's Green, a pub in Hertfordshire, England

== Other uses ==
- Horn Cable Television, a television channel in Somalia
- Horn (Chinese constellation), part of the European constellation Virgo
- Horn (diacritic), in the Vietnamese alphabet
- Horn (heraldry), common features in crests in Scandinavian and German heraldry
- Horn family, Swedish noble family from Finland
- Horn (surname), including a list of people with the name
- Horn, part of a saddle
- Hörn, or Freyja, a Norse goddess
- Pyramidal peak, sometimes called a glacial horn
- The horn, a slang term for telephone

== See also ==
- Cape Horn (disambiguation)
- Horn House (disambiguation)
- Horns (disambiguation)
- Horne (disambiguation)
- Hoorn (disambiguation)
- Horned God, a Wiccan deity
