= Van Horn High School =

Van Horn High School may refer to:

- Van Horn High School (Missouri), a public high school in Independence, Missouri, United States (Kansas City area)
- Van Horn High School (Texas), a public high school in Van Horn, Texas, United States
