= Horn House (disambiguation) =

Horn House is a Hakka bar-style house located at Mei County, Xiyang, Fuliang village, Guangdong, China.

Horn House may also refer to:

- Horn House (Decorah, Iowa), a historic residence located northwest of Decorah, Iowa, U.S.
- Horn family, a Swedish noble family from Finland, recognized by the Swedish House of Nobility
- Louis Horn House, Stafford–Olive Historic District, Washington, Franklin County, Missouri, U.S.
- Horn House, Rehoboth, Massachusetts, U.S., by Ira Rakatansky (1919–2014), modernist architect

== See also ==
- Leroy Mayfield House, or Mayfield-Horn House, a historic home in Richland Township, Monroe County, Indiana, U.S.
- Thistledome, or Horn-McAuley House or Chalmers/Horn House, a historic house in Byhalia, Mississippi, U.S.
- House of Horn, album by Paul Horn
- Horn, Germany
- Hornhausen, a village in the Börde district in Saxony-Anhalt, Germany
- Souvan House, or Hohn House, Ljubljana, Slovenia
- Van Horn House (disambiguation), historic houses
