= Allamoore Independent School District =

School district in Texas

District information
- Established: 1910
- Closed: 1995 (replaced by Culberson County-Allamoore Independent School District)

Students and staff
- Students: 3 (1995)

The Allamoore Independent School District was a public school district based in the community of Allamoore, Texas, United States. The approximately 2,100-square-mile (5,400 km^{2}) district was known as the Allamoore Consolidated Independent District prior to 1992.

== History ==
The one-room schoolhouse was built circa 1910. In previous eras, the school had two teachers. In later eras, there was only one teacher who also did all administrative functions. Enrollment was determined by the fluctuating number of employees on ranches in the area. In portions of the 1950s and 1960s, the district hired a teacher to be at the school, but there were no students to teach. In 1988, Allamoore's total enrollment was eight students, which made it one of the smallest school districts in the state of Texas. In 1990, that figure was down to three, cousins of one another, with one of the students being the daughter of the teacher. By 1995, the student population was still three.

On July 1, 1995, Allamoore ISD consolidated with the Culberson County Independent School District based in nearby Van Horn to form the Culberson County-Allamoore Independent School District.

== Operations ==
In 1990, the teacher/administrator reported that lesson planning took a lot of work as the students were not of the same age.

== District enrollment (1988-1995) ==
- 1988-89 – 3 students
- 1989-90 – 3 students
- 1990-91 – 2 students
- 1991-92 – 2 students
- 1992-93 – 8 students
- 1993-94 – 3 students
- 1994-95 – 3 students

== See also ==
- Divide Independent School District - Commonly described as a one room schoolhouse
- Juno Common School District - Former one room schoolhouse
