= VHN =

VHN may refer to:

- Vickers hardness number, one kilogram-force per square millimeter
- Culberson County Airport, the IATA code VHN
