= Van der Hoorn =

Van der Hoorn is a Dutch surname. Notable people with the surname include:

- Fred van der Hoorn (born 1963), Dutch football defender and manager
- Lenie van der Hoorn (born 1948), Dutch speed skater
- Mike van der Hoorn (born 1992), Dutch football defender
- Taco van der Hoorn (born 1993), Dutch racing cyclist

== See also ==
- Van Hoorn (surname)
- Van Horne (disambiguation)
- Van Horn (disambiguation)
- Den Hoorn (disambiguation)
