= Herne railway station (disambiguation) =

Herne railway station may refer to:

- Herne station, in Germany
- Herne railway station (Belgium), in Belgium

== See also ==
- Herne Hill railway station, in the London Borough of Lambeth, South London
- Herne Bay railway station, on the Chatham Main Line in Kent, England
- Heren railway station, Taiwan
- Horne railway station in North Jutland, Denmark
