= Coat of arms of Hoorn =

Coat of arms of the town and municipality of Hoorn

The coat of arms of Hoorn is a coat of arms that has been in use since the Middle Ages. Although over time it underwent some changes, there has been no change to the coat of arms since it was acknowledged in use by the High Council of Nobility in 1816. At present, in the original form, it is the coat of arms of the municipality of Hoorn. The current municipality was formed in 1979 by merging the city of Hoorn with the villages Zwaag and Westerblokker; it was decided to use the old coat of arms as coat of arms of the new municipality.

== Origin ==
The actual coat of arms, the shield, shows a horn held by a blue ribbon. According to a myth this is a horn of a bull, which fled from Monnickendam and lost its horn while pounding the city gate of Hoorn. Upon seeing the horn the sheriff decided that the horn would become part of the coat of arms of the city, as the city didn’t have a coat of arms yet.

== Development ==
The horn has always been part of the coat of arms, but during times there have been several supporters, during the 15th century both Mary, with baby Jesus, and John the Baptist (patron saint of the city), have been supporters of several official coats of arms. More normal pieces had Mary seated on a Gothic throne on top of the coat of arms. The seal of secrets of the city showed John the Baptist with the coat of arms at his feet

In 1538 the coat of arms of the city was shown for the first time with two unicorns instead of Mary. This was the actual coat of arms of the bishop Jan van Egmond, bishop of the Archdiocese of Utrecht. Following the Reformation Mary was also replaced in the city seals by a unicorn, this time a single unicorn. Because of the Christian symbolism this was seen as an appropriate substitute.

During the French domination the coat of arms was changed to the French standard. An eagle replaced the unicorn. As soon as the Batavian Republic was there the coat of arms from before French rule was reinstalled; this time it was also requested at the High Council of Nobility (Dutch: Hoge Raad van Adel), so it became official. The coat of arms was acknowledged at June 26, 1816

== Blazon ==
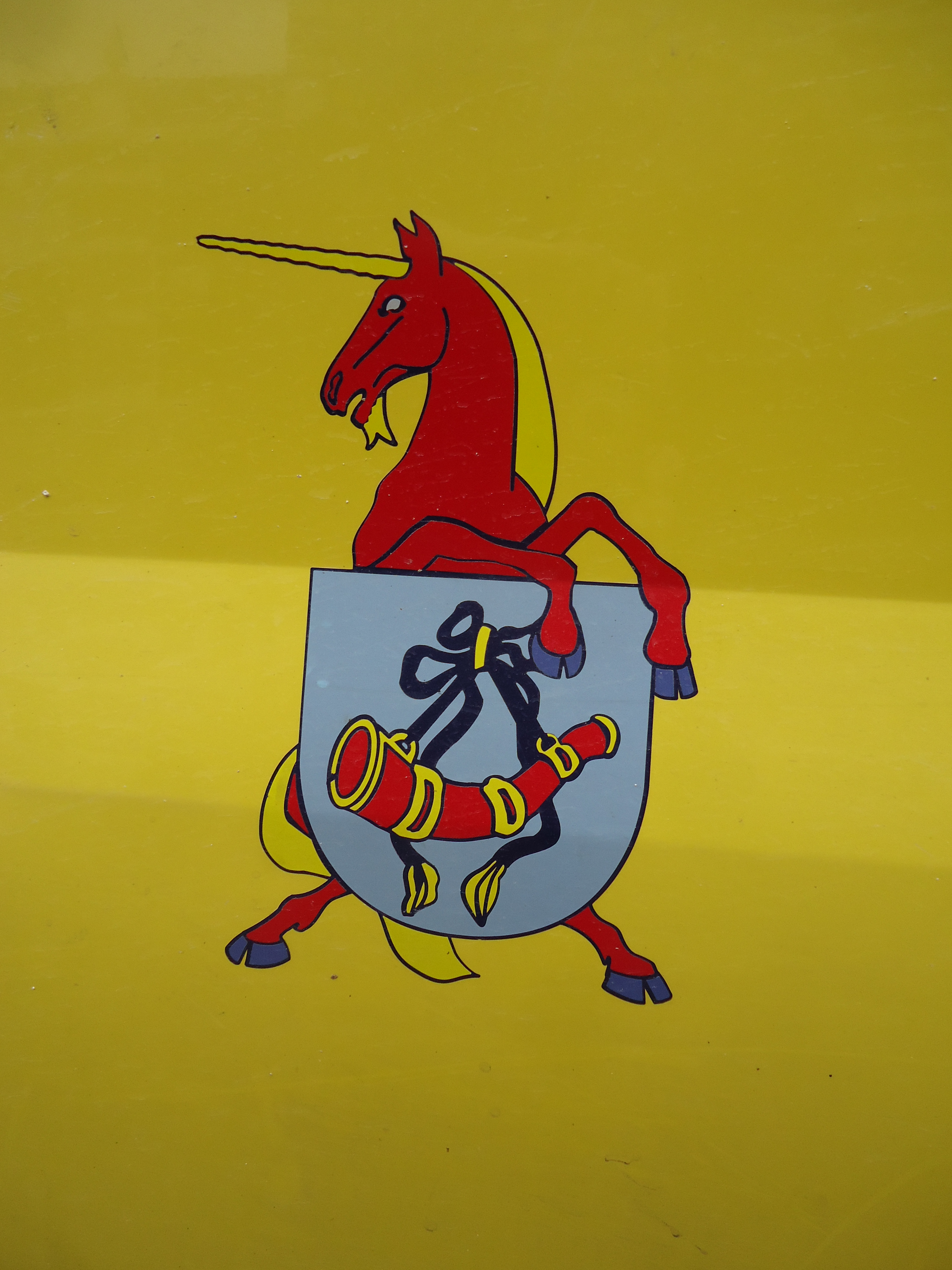
Coat of arms on a vehicle of the municipality of Hoorn

The description or the blazon of the coat of arms of Hoorn is as follows:

Van zilver, beladen met een hoorn van keel (rood), geringd met goud, geband met lazuur (blauw), met gouden kwasten, het schild van achteren vastgehouden door een zittende Eenhoorn van keel (rood), gehoornd, gemaand, gebaard, gevlokt en gestaart van goud.

— Gemeentegids 2012, Cijfers en wetenswaardigheden over Hoorn, pag. 20, Wapen van Hoorn

In English: "Of silver, charged with a horn gules (red), ringed with gold, banded with azure (blue), with gold tassels, the shield held from behind by a sitting Unicorn gules (red), horned, maned, bearded, and flaked tailed of gold." This blazon makes this coat of arms an example of canting arms.

== Other usage ==
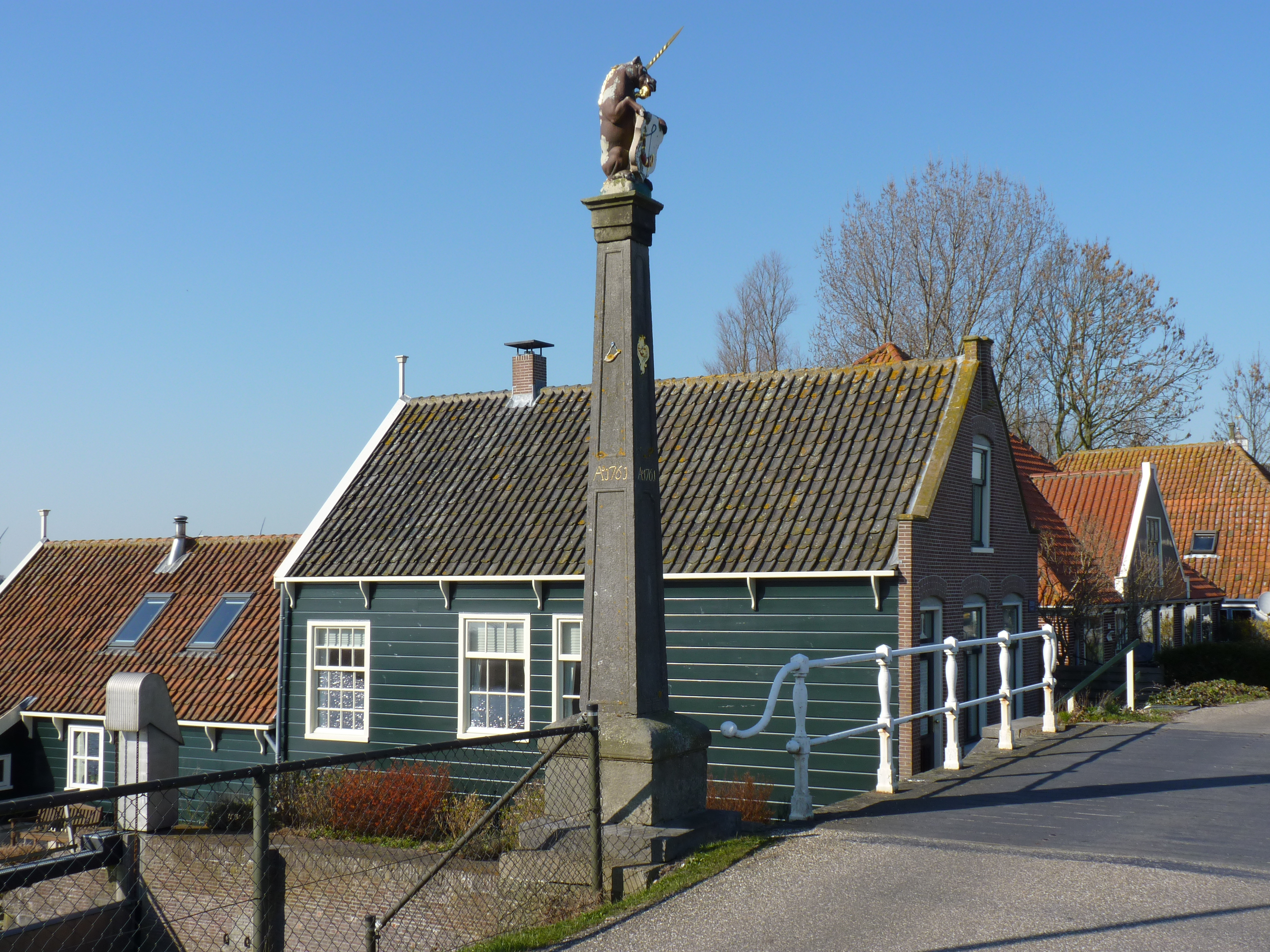
Banishing pole at Schardam.

The unicorn with shield and horn are not only to be seen in the city and municipality of Hoorn. In the region West-Friesland are several banishing poles (a pole telling a banned person not to pass it, or this person will enter the judicial area and can be judged) with this unicorn on top of it. The horn points towards the city of Hoorn. One of these poles still stands in the village of Schardam, this pole dates from 1761. In 2007 big unicorns were painted by several artists to celebrate 650 years of town privileges. These unicorns later went on to auction.

== Other versions ==
Coat of arms as can be seen on the Weigh house

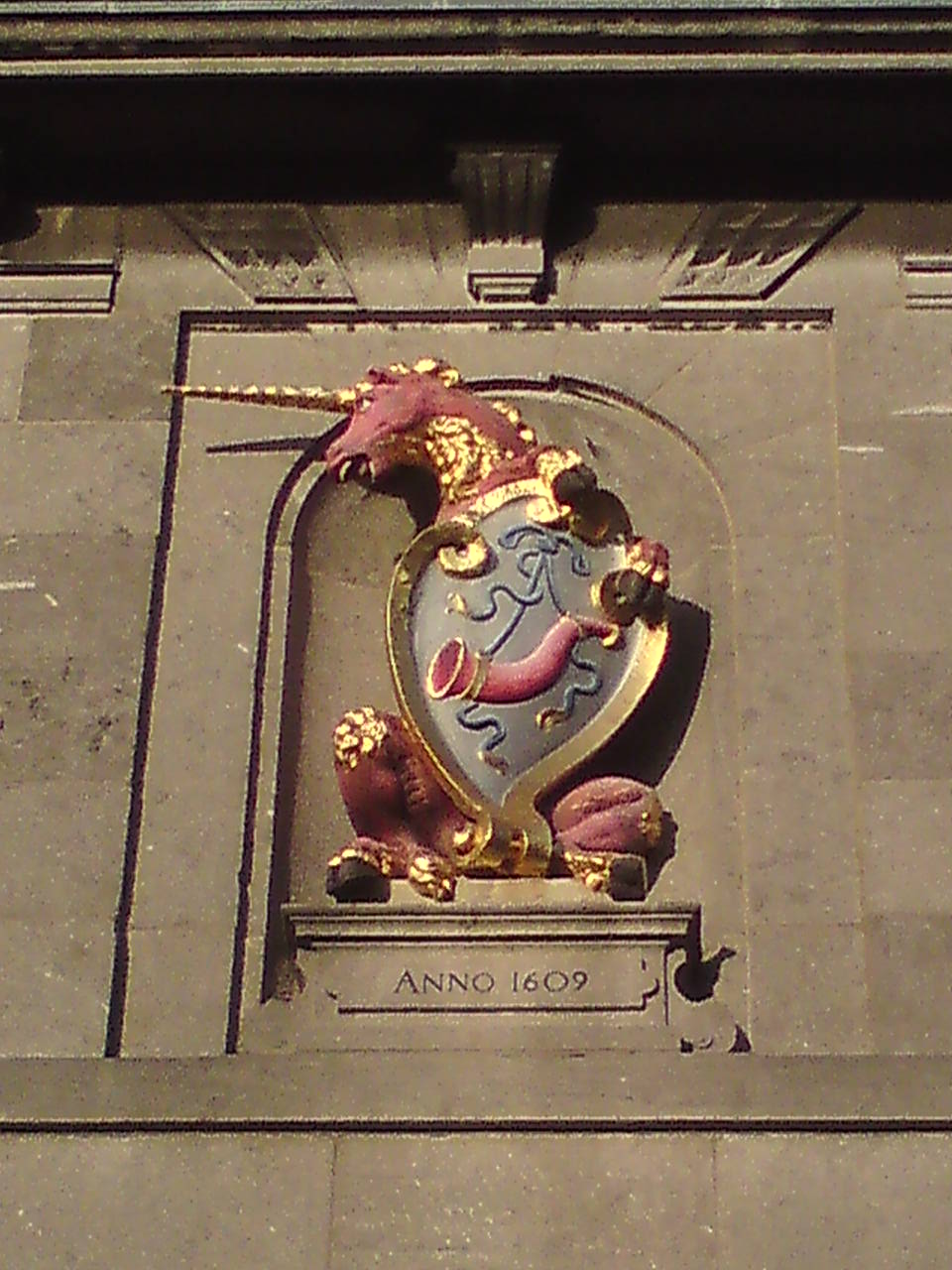
Coat of arms at the Weigh house

== See also ==
- 't Wapen van Hoorn, ships named after the coat of arms
