= Battle of Abrolhos =

1631 naval conflict

Coordinates: 18.0333°S 38.6667°W

- Part of the Dutch invasions of Brazil
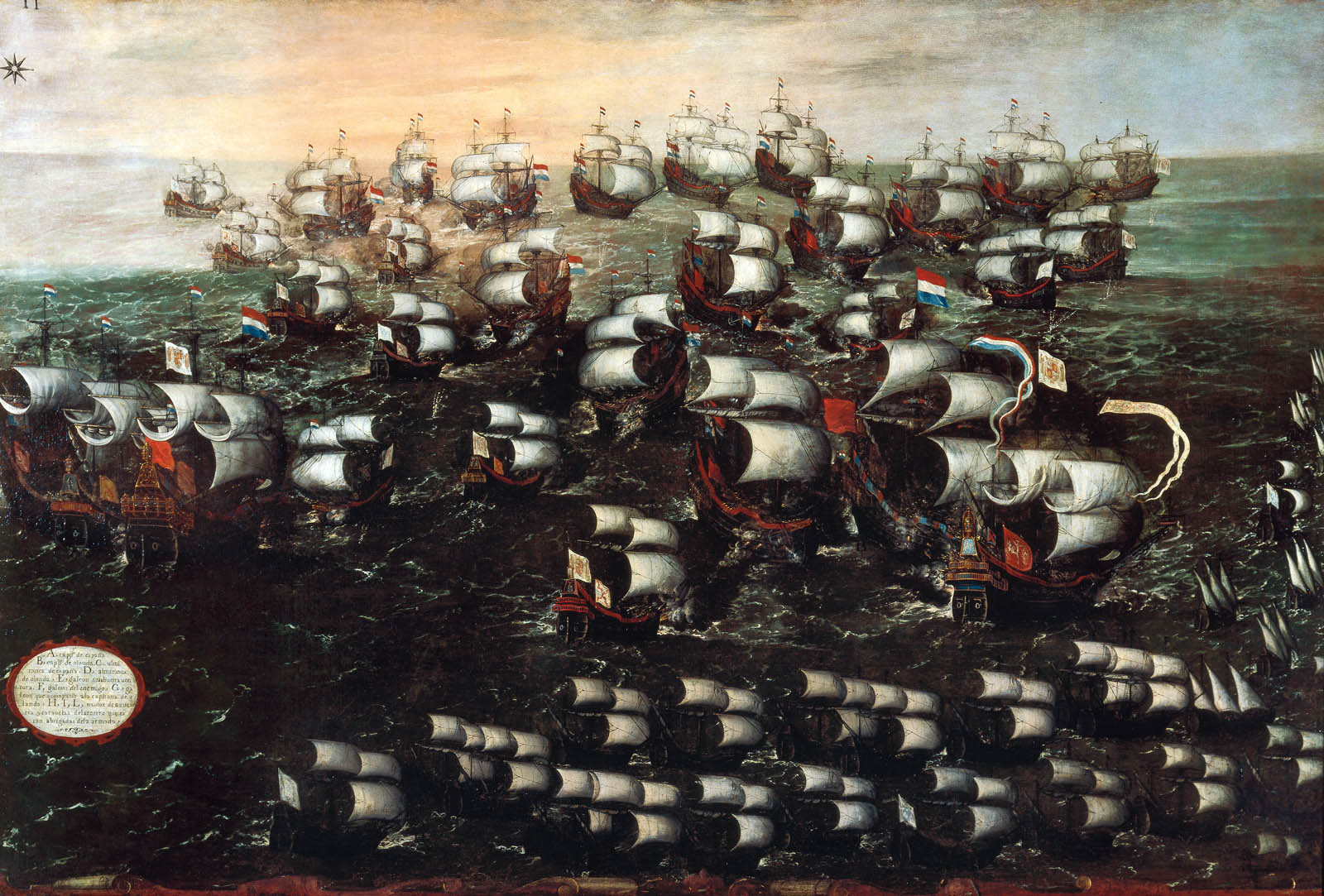
- The Battle of Abrolhos c. 1632, by Juan de la Corte. Oil on canvas. Naval Museum of Madrid.
Date	12 September 1631
Location	Off Pernambuco (present-day Brazil)
Result	See aftermath

Belligerents
Spain; Portugal	Dutch Republic; WIC

Commanders and leaders
Antonio de Oquendo	Adrian Jansz Pater †; Maerten Thijssen

Strength
20 warships (5 unarmed)	16 warships

Casualties and losses
1 galleon sunk 1 galleon captured 500 dead and 100 wounded	Flagship Prins Willem sunk 1 or 2 other ships sunk From 350 dead and 80 wounded to about 2,000 casualties

The naval Battle of the Abrolhos took place on 12 September 1631 off the coast of Pernambuco, Brazil, during the Eighty Years' War. A joint Spanish-Portuguese fleet under admiral Antonio de Oquendo defeated the Dutch after a six-hour naval battle.

== Background ==
On 5 May 1631 Spanish admiral Antonio de Oquendo left Lisbon with a fleet of about 20 men-of-war. Oquendo carried reinforcements to Paraíba, Pernambuco, and Bahia. On his way back to Portugal, he was to convoy ships loaded with sugar. So as to allow the Dutch extra time to get ready, he headed first for Bahia. Once the Dutch learned of his coming, their fleet in Pernambuco, led by admiral Adrian Pater, sailed to intercept the Spanish convoy. Despite having 33 ships at Pernambuco, Pater left 17 in port as he considered only 8 of Oquendo's to be battleworthy. Finally, on September 12, the two fleets met around the cays.

== Ships involved ==
Oquendo exited Baía de Todos os Santos with his 44-gun, 900-ton flagship Santiago de Oliste and 28-gun, 700-ton vice-flagship San Antonio; 30-gun Nuestra Señora de la Concepción; 28-gun Nuestra Señora del Buen Suceso; 26-gun Nuestra Señora de la Anunciada; 24-gun San Carlos; 22-gun San Buenaventura; 20-gun San Blas, San Francisco and San Pedro; 18-gun San Bartolomé, and San Martín; plus the requisitioned French pinnaces Lion Doré of 10 guns (renamed San Antonio), and Saint Pierre of 8 guns (renamed San Pedro). These Spanish men-of-war were accompanied by the 28-gun Portuguese warship São Jorge; 20-gun Santiago; 19-gun São João Baptista; 18-gun Nossa Senhora dos Prazeres (Maior), and Nossa Senhora dos Prazeres (Menor); plus the unarmed Nossa Senhora da Boa Nova, Nossa Senhora do Rozário, Santo António, Santa Cruz, and São Jerónimo.

This force was protecting ten unarmed Brazilian caravels bearing 1,200 troops under the Neapolitan-born cmdr. Giovanni Vincenzo de San Felice, Conde de Bagnuoli, intended to reinforce the town of Paraíba in addition to 20 Lisbon-bound sugar merchantmen. Standing away from the coast, the entire formation was driven southeast by contrary winds and currents into the vicinity of the Abrolhos (rocks 300 kilometres or 200 miles off Brazil at about 18 degrees south latitude, their name deriving from the Portuguese phrase "abre olhos-eyes open-intended" as a warning of the half-submerged dangers). On the evening of 11 September the Iberian fleet was sighted by admiral Pater, who prepared for action overnight.

During Pater's voyage two of his ships became separated, leaving the Dutch admiral with his 46-gun, 1,000-ton flagship of the Dutch fleet Prins Willem and 50-gun, 800-ton Vice-flagship Geunieerde Provintien; 38-gun Provincie Ultrecht; 34-gun Walcheren; 32-gun Griffoen and Groeningen; 30-gun Hollandia and Oliphant; 28-gun Amersfoort and Goeree; 26-gun Mercurius; 24-gun Dordrecht; 22-gun Medemblik; 20-gun Fortuijn and Wapen van Hoorn; plus 14-gun Niew Nederlandt.

== Battle ==
At first light the admiral summoned his captains for final instructions, then drank a toast of Brunswick beer to the day's success. The Dutch admiral Pater had formed his fleet in two lines. Pater bore down in faint east-northeasterly breezes upon Oquendo, who was 10 km (6 mi) distant, having ordered his 17 Spanish and Portuguese galleons to interpose in a half-moon crescent between the enemy and the convoy. Five ships were out of sight to the rear because they had not received the orders of admiral Oquendo: Anunciada, Buenaventura, San Carlos, San Bartolomé, and the flagship of admiral Massibradi, of the Castilian naval Squadron. The Dutch did not see them and instead maneuvered to engage the rest of the Spanish fleet.

Fighting began around mid-morning, when Vice Admiral de Vallecilla's San Antonio opened fire on Thijssen's advancing Geunieerde Provintien, which closed into board along with Provincie Ultrecht. About 15 minutes later de Oquendo and four other galleons opened fire on Pater's flagship, which steered directly toward Santiago de Oliste with Walcheren. The Dutch held their opening broadsides until point-blank range, then fired and grappled. A murderous engagement erupted around each flagship and vice-flag, both sides firing repeatedly into their opponents and yet unable to board. The smallest Portuguese galleon, Nossa Senhora dos Prazeres of Capt. Cosme do Couto Barbosa attempted to support Santiago de Oliste, only to drift helplessly beneath the combined guns of Prins Willem and Walcheren and be sunk. Its place was taken by the much larger Concepción of Capt. Juan de Prado. Around this time, Admiral Massibradi arrived with his five ships, tipping the balance towards the Spaniards, but the fight was still fierce.

About 4 pm, a shot from de Oquendo's flagship started a blaze aboard Prins Willem, which the Spanish admiral cleverly directed his musketeers to fire at, so as to hamper Dutch fire-fighting efforts. The flames gained hold and finally drove Pater into the water, along with a few survivors, where he drowned. About this same time, de Vallecilla's vice-flag, San Antonio, broke up and went down by its stern, taking most of the complement, while its Dutch foe Provincie Ultrecht sheered off in flames and was later sunk.

Thijsen's Geunieerde Provintien was battered but in possession of a single prize – Buenaventura of Capt. Alonso de Alarcón y Molina, who had sailed to San Antonio's side during the fighting, only to lose his life and ship. The remaining Dutch vessels were content to fire from long range – Hollandia, Amersfoort, and Fortuijn being the only others to become closely engaged-while the Spaniards responded in kind.

== Aftermath ==
The day ended without a clear victor, although depending on the sources Spanish losses may have been somewhat greater. According to David Marley, a Vice-flagship and galleon were sunk and another was taken, with 585 dead and missing (240 of these aboard the captured Buenaventura) plus 201 wounded. The Dutch flagship and another man-of-war disappeared beneath the waves, leaving 350 dead and missing plus more than 80 seriously wounded. According to Miguel Esquerdo Galiana, the Dutch fleet lost 2,000 men and three galleons.

However, strategically the battle was more favourably to the Iberians. Thijssen showed no inclination to renew action the next day, preferring to limp back to Recife with his mauled fleet on 21–22 September. Oquendo meanwhile deposited his reinforcements at Barra Grande of Porto Calvo – only 700 of them actually reached Fort Arrail do Bom Jesus – before continuing toward Europe with his sugar convoy. The Dutch garrison at Pernambuco subsequently evacuated Olinda in November in order to concentrate its strength around Recife.
