= Hoorn (disambiguation) =

Hoorn is a city in North Holland, the Netherlands.

Hoorn may also refer to:

== Places ==
- Hoorn, Heerde, Gelderland, Netherlands
- Hoorn, Friesland, Netherlands
- County of Horne, or Hoorn, a county of the Holy Roman Empire in present-day Netherlands and Belgium
- Hoorn Islands, South Pacific islands named after the city of Hoorn

== People with the surname ==
- Jordanus Hoorn (1753–1833), Dutch painter
- Carol Hoorn Fraser (1930–1991), American figurative artist active in Canada

== See also ==
- Horn (disambiguation)
- Den Hoorn (disambiguation)
- Van Hoorn, a surname
