= Van Horne =

Van Horne may refer to:

== People ==
- Van Horne (surname), including a list of people with the name

== Buildings ==
- Van Horne House, listed on the National Register of Historic Places in Somerset County, New Jersey
- Van Horne Mansion, house in Montreal, Quebec
- Walrath-Van Horne House, listed on the National Register of Historic Places in Montgomery County, New York

== Places ==
- Van Horne, Iowa, United States

== See also ==
- Van Hoorn (surname)
- Van Horn (disambiguation)
- Van der Hoorn, surname
