= Stafford–Olive Historic District =

Historic district in Missouri, United States

- U.S. National Register of Historic Places
- U.S. Historic district
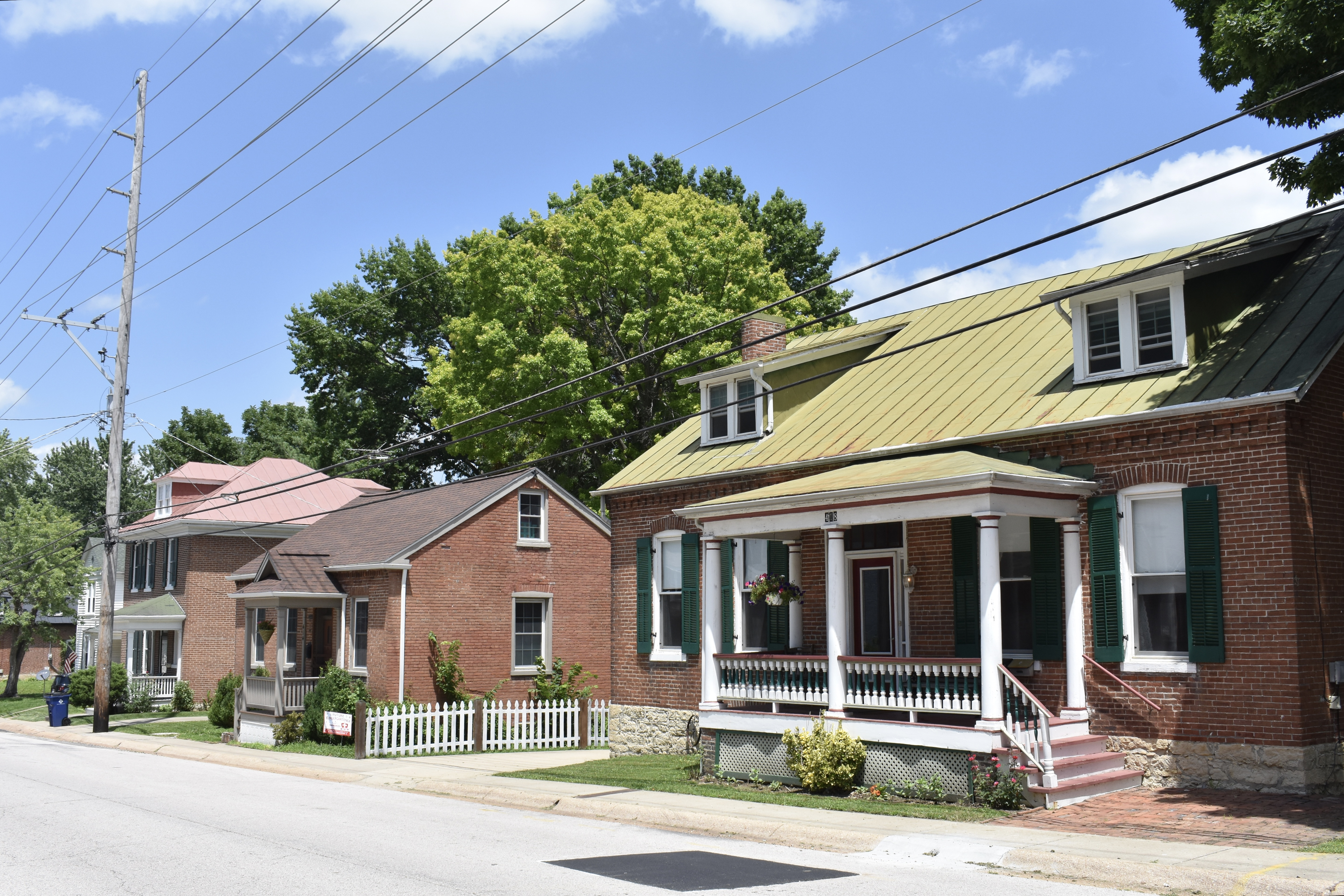
- Stafford–Olive Historic District, July 2026

- Location within Missouri Location within the United States
- Location: Roughly bounded by Stafford, Olive, W. 5th, and W. 2nd Sts., Washington, Missouri
- Coordinates: 38°33′32″N 91°0′57″W
- Area: 30 acres (12 ha)
- Architect: Willenbrink, Rudy; Waldrum, George
- Architectural style: Queen Anne, Second Empire, Missouri German
- MPS: Washington, Missouri MPS
- NRHP reference No.: 00001114
- Added to NRHP: September 14, 2000

Stafford–Olive Historic District is a national historic district located at Washington, Franklin County, Missouri. The district encompasses 140 contributing buildings in a predominantly residential section of Washington. The district developed between about 1858 and 1949, and includes representative examples of Queen Anne, Second Empire, Tudor Revival, Colonial Revival, and Bungalow / American Craftsman style residential architecture. Notable buildings include the Jos. Rumme House (c. 1865), Chas Haupt House (c. 1875), Louis Horn House (c. 1858), F. R. Pelster House (c. 1865), Hydecker House (c. 1858), Stephen Filla House (c. 1909), Chas. Kopp House (c. 1930), Hy. Thias Honse (c. 1855), and William Pace House (1929).

It was listed on the National Register of Historic Places in 2000.
