= Hoorn, Friesland =

Hoorn Hoarn
- Village
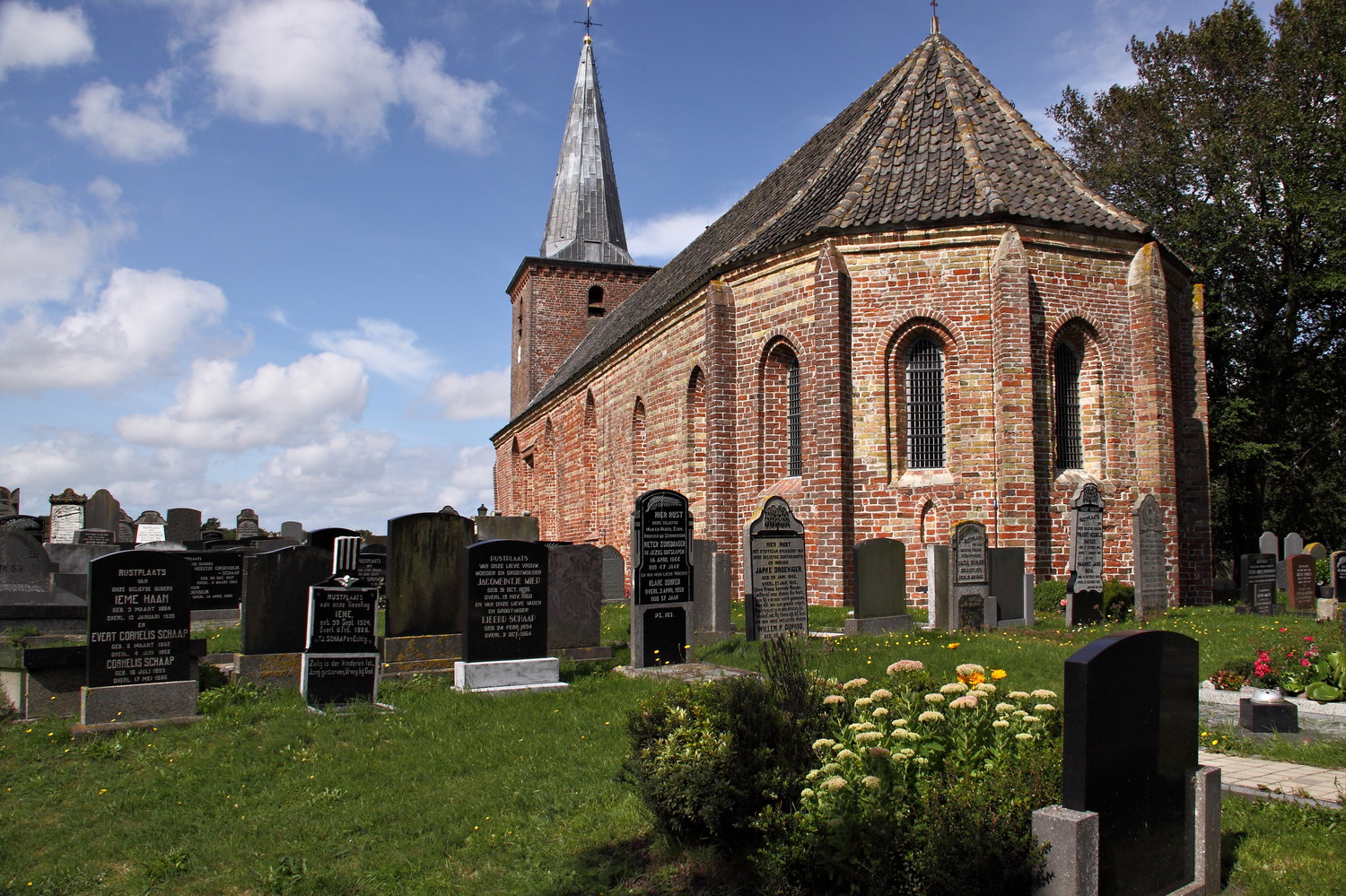
- St John's Church

- Location of Hoorn on Terschelling

- Location in the Netherlands
- Country: Netherlands
- Province: Friesland
- Municipality: Terschelling

Population (1 January 2017)
  - Total: 465
- Time zone: UTC+1 (CET)
  - Summer (DST): UTC+2 (CEST)
- Postal code: 8896
- Dialing code: 0562

Hoorn (West Frisian: Hoarn) is a village in the north of the Netherlands, on the Wadden Sea island of Terschelling, Friesland. It had a population of around 465 in January 2017.

== Sources ==
- Municipality guide Terschelling 2005-2006
