= Horn (am Bodensee) =

- Village of Gaienhofen
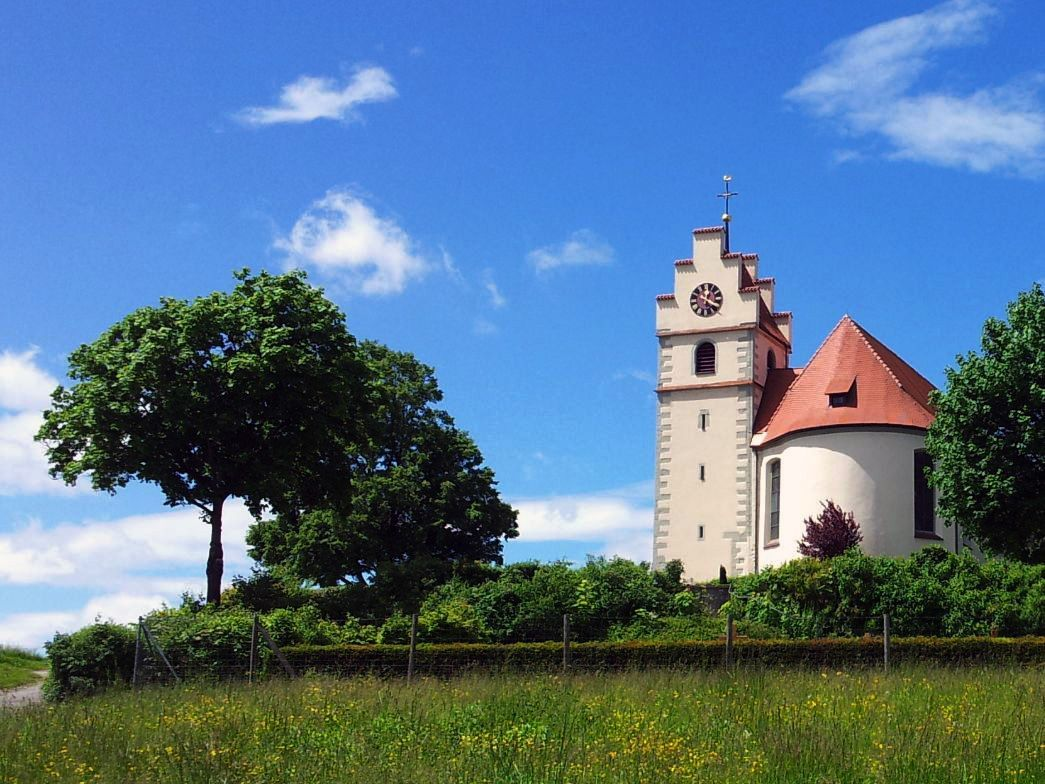
- Church of Saint John the Baptist and Saint Vitus

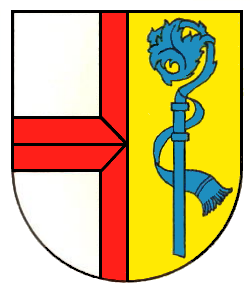
- Coat of arms
- Interactive map of Horn
- Location within Germany Location within Baden-Württemberg
- Coordinates: 47°41′46″N 8°59′45″E
- Country: Germany
- State: Baden-Württemberg
- District: Konstanz (district)
- Town: Gaienhofen
- Time zone: UTC+01:00 (CET)
  - Summer (DST): UTC+02:00 (CEST)
- Dialling codes: 07735

Horn (am Bodensee) is a village in Baden-Württemberg, Germany. It is administratively part of the town of Gaienhofen in the Konstanz district.
