= Culberson County-Allamoore Independent School District =

School district in Texas

Culberson County-Allamoore Independent School District is a public school district based in Van Horn, Texas (USA). The district serves all of Culberson County, and eastern portions of Hudspeth County. As of the 2021-2022 school year, the district had 360 students.

The district was created on July 1, 1995 by the consolidation of the Culberson County and Allamore independent school districts.

In 2009, the school district was rated "academically acceptable" by the Texas Education Agency.

== Schools ==
- Van Horn High School (Grades 9-12)
- Van Horn Junior High School (Grades 6-8)
- Eagle Elementary School (Grades PK-5)
