= Rosa Horn =

American preacher and church leader (1880–1976)

- Born: December 2, 1880; Sumter, South Carolina, United States
- Died: May 11, 1976 (aged 95); Baltimore, Maryland, United States
- Occupations: Pentecostal church leader, preacher and radio host
- Years active: 1913-1969
- Employer: WHN radio
- Children: 2

Rosa Artimus Horn (December 2, 1880 – May 11, 1976), also known as Mother Horn and the Pray for me Priestess, was an African-American Pentecostal church leader, preacher and radio host. She founded the "Pentecostal Faith Church for All Nations" in Harlem, New York City.

== Biography ==
Horn was born on December 2, 1880, in Sumter, South Carolina. Her grandparents had been enslaved, and her grandmother, Ellen Hamilton, had purchased her freedom and the freedom of her husband before Emancipation.

Horn was one of ten children and her mother Sarah Baker insisted that she attend a private school in Sumter. Horn worked as a seamstress in Augusta, Georgia, after leaving education.

Horn married musician William Artimus and they had two children together. Her husband discovered that he had terminal tuberculosis and Horn later claimed in Negro Digest magazine that he had then tried to kill her, but "the Lord wrought a miracle and lifted me bodily from one chair to another just as my love-crazed husband fired a bullet at my back." After her husband died, Horn had a spiritual vision and moved to Evanston, Illinois, with her daughter Jessie.

Horn had been a member of the Methodist Church, but was ordained by the American faith healer, Evangelist and revivalist Maria Woodworth Etter in Indiana in 1913. She preached in Evanston in the early 1920s.

After remarrying in 1926, Horn settled in Brooklyn, New York to expand her ministry. Frustrated by the refusal of some local Protestant denominations to ordain women, in 1930 Horn founded the "Pentecostal Faith Church for All Nations" in Harlem, New York City. The Church was also known as "Mount Calvary" and Horn was known in the church as Mother Horn. Frank Rasky of the Negro Digest visited Horn's church and reported that she preached that she would "punch the devil in the eye." She had established churches in five cities along the East Coast by 1934.

As her ministry gained popularity, Horn was invited to broadcast the program You Pray for Me Church of the Air nationally on WHN radio, from 1933. WHN launched an advertising campaign which promoted a rivalry between her and the Church of Christ (Holiness) preacher Lightfoot Solomon Michaux. On air, Horn crusaded against "dens of iniquity," such as cabarets, dance halls and pool rooms. She became known as the "Pray for me Priestess" by her radio listeners.

Over the next three decades, thousands of members joined Horn's church, with poor black migrants from the American South attracted to her prayer ministry. Members included a teenage James Baldwin. His stage play The Amen Corner explores the role of a church in an African-American family and his character Pastor Margaret was influenced by Horn's life and ministry.

In 1960, plainclothes police officers raided the barber shop located in Horn's Church loft. She ceased preaching in 1969.

Horn moved to Baltimore, Maryland, and died there on May 11, 1976, aged 95. She was buried in the Ferncliff Cemetery and Mausoleum in New York.
