= Den Hoorn =

Den Hoorn can refer to:

- Den Hoorn, South Holland, a town in the municipality Midden-Delfland in the province South Holland in the Netherlands.
- Den Hoorn, North Holland, a town on the island Texel in the province North Holland in the Netherlands.
- Wehe-den Hoorn, a merger of the village Wehe and Den Hoorn.
- Den Hoorn or Sint-Rita, a village in Damme municipality, Belgium.
- a former village in South Holland; now part of Zoetermeer.

== See also ==
- Horn (disambiguation)
- Hoorn (disambiguation)
