= Van Horne (surname) =

Van Horne is a Dutch surname occurring mainly in the United States and Canada.

== List of people with the surname ==
- Archibald Van Horne (c. 1758–1817), American politician
- Charles Van Horne (1921–2003), Canadian politician
- Dave Van Horne, American baseball announcer
- Espy Van Horne (1795–1829), U.S. Representative from Pennsylvania
- Harriet Van Horne (1920–1998), American newspaper columnist and film/television critic
- Heidi Van Horne, American actress and model
- Herman van Horne (died 1156), Dutch bishop
- Isaac Van Horne (1754–1834), U.S. Representative from Pennsylvania
- James Van Horne (1935–2025), American economist and finance academic
- Jim Van Horne (born 1950), Canadian sports anchor
- Johannes Van Horne, physician and anatomist
- Keith Van Horne (born 1957), American football player in the National Football League
- Mahlon Van Horne (1840–1910), American minister, state legislator, and diplomat
- Randy Van Horne (1924–2007), American singer and Flintstones theme song creator
- Robert Van Horne (born 1948), American composer and concert pianist
- Robert Van Horne (American football), American football coach
- Ron Van Horne (1932–2017), Canadian politician
- Terry Van Horne (1946–2012), American politician
- William Cornelius Van Horne (1843–1915), Canadian railway executive

== Fictional characters ==
- Melvin Van Horne, the real name of Sideshow Mel in The Simpsons
- Daryl Van Horne, the main antagonist of the 1987 fantasy-comedy The Witches of Eastwick (film). Played by Jack Nicholson.
