= Horne, Hjørring Municipality =

Village in Vendsyssel, Denmark

Horne
- Village
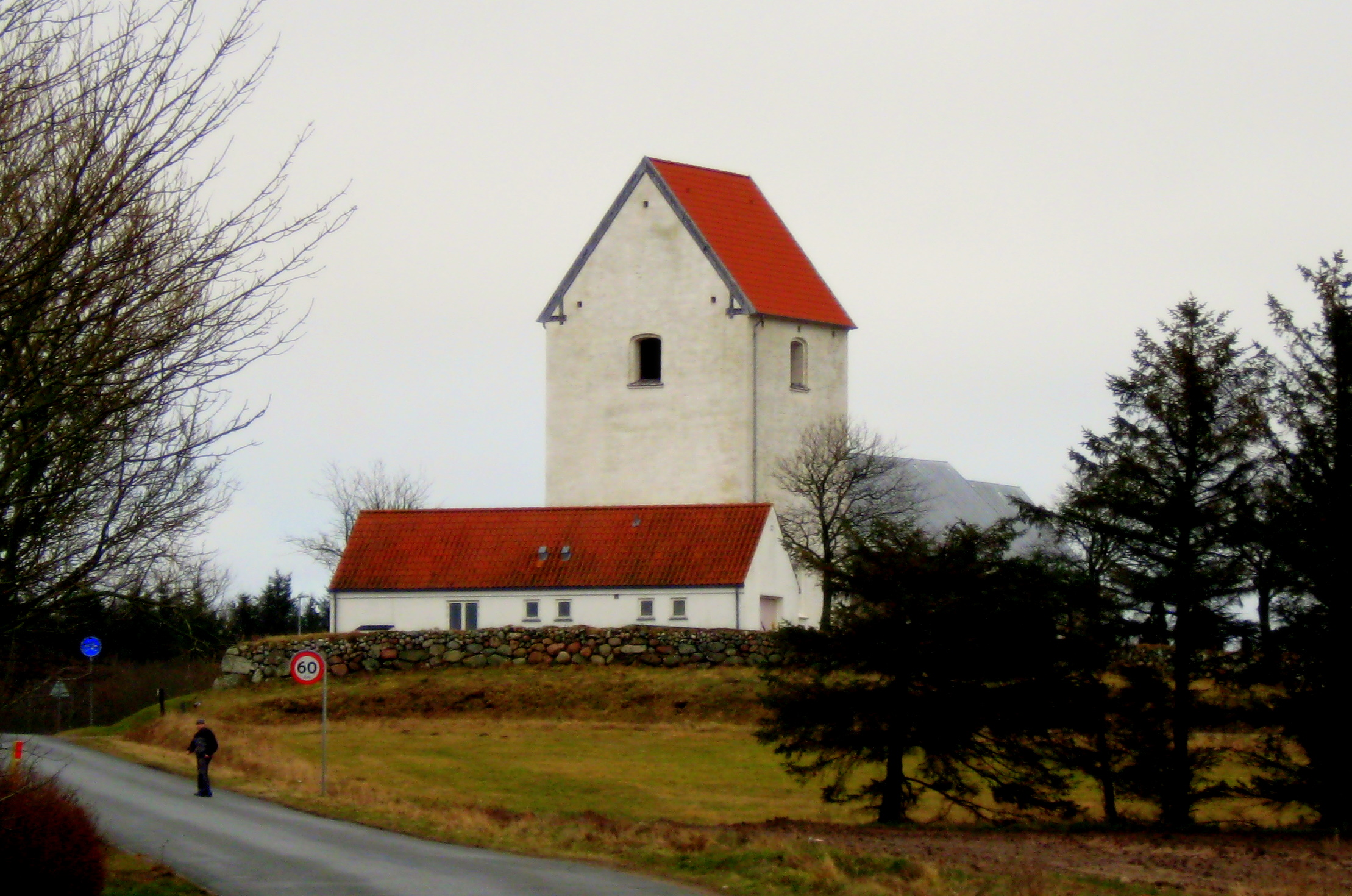
- Horne Church

- Location in North Jutland Region Horne (Denmark)
- Coordinates: 57°33′34″N 9°59′27″E
- Country: Denmark
- Region: North Jutland Region
- Municipality: Hjørring Municipality

Population (2026)
  - Urban: 672
- Time zone: UTC+1 (CET)
  - Summer (DST): UTC+2 (CEST)
- Postal code: DK-9850 Hirtshals

Horne is a village in Hjørring Municipality in North Jutland Region, Denmark. As of 1 January 2026, it has the population of 672. It is located in the north-western part of the Vendsyssel district about 5 km (3.1 mi) south of the town of Hirtshals.

Horne Church is located just west of the village.

The village is served by Horne railway station, located about 1 km (0.62 mi) west of the village on the railway line between Hirtshals and Hjørring.

== Notable people ==
- Mogens Krogh (born 1963), a Danish former professional football player and manager.
- Niels Hausgaard (born 1944), a Danish singer, songwriter and comedian.

== Gallery ==
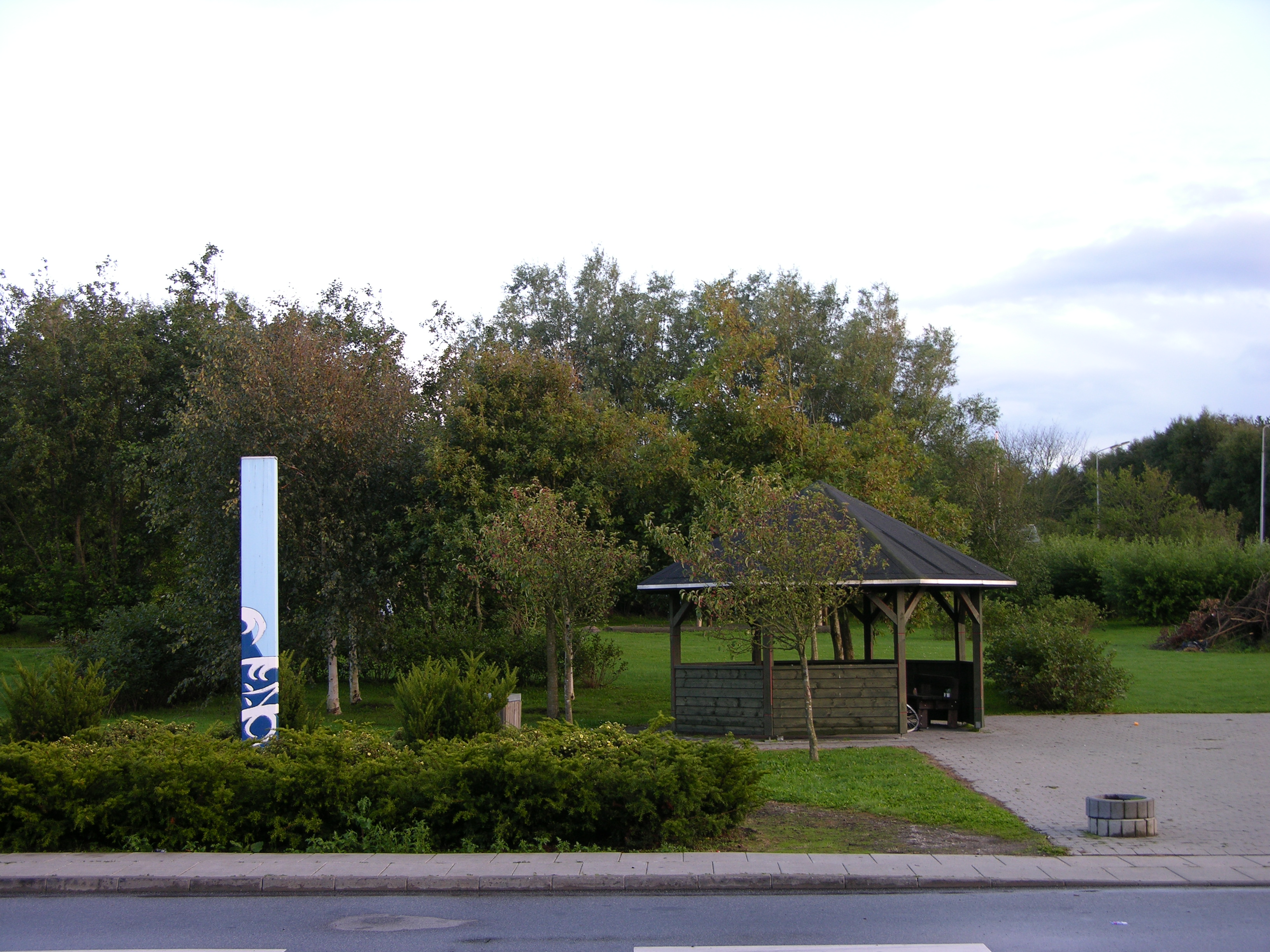
Horne village

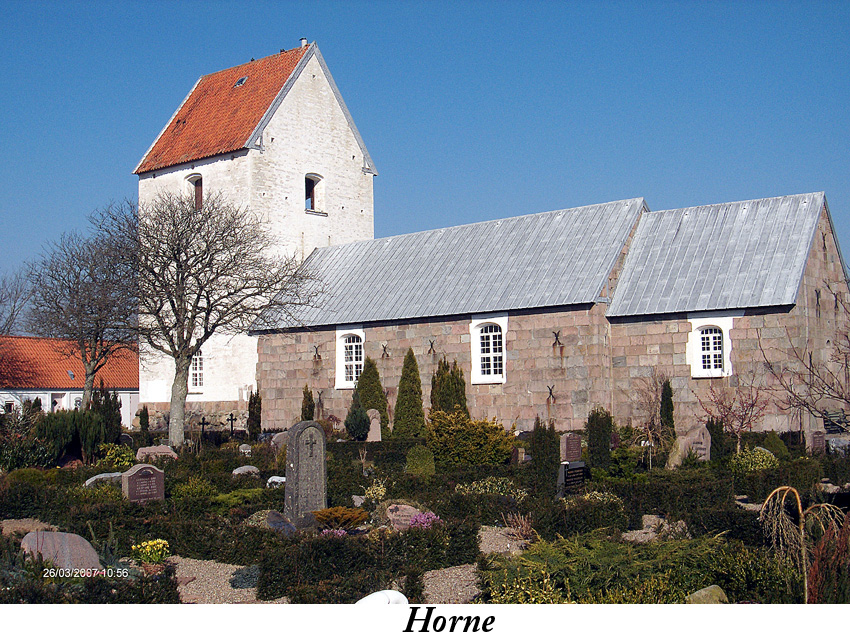
Horne Church

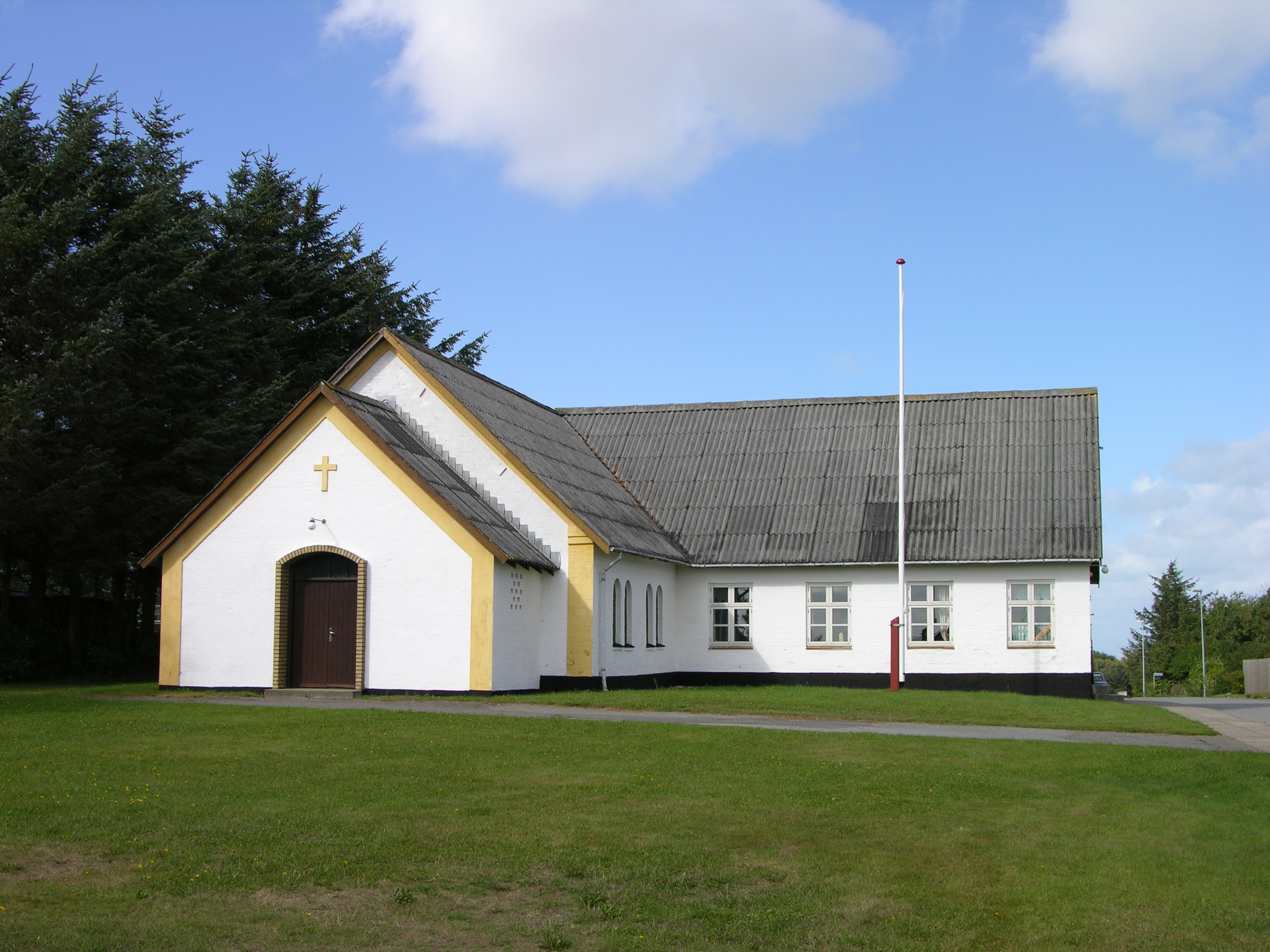
Horne Mission House

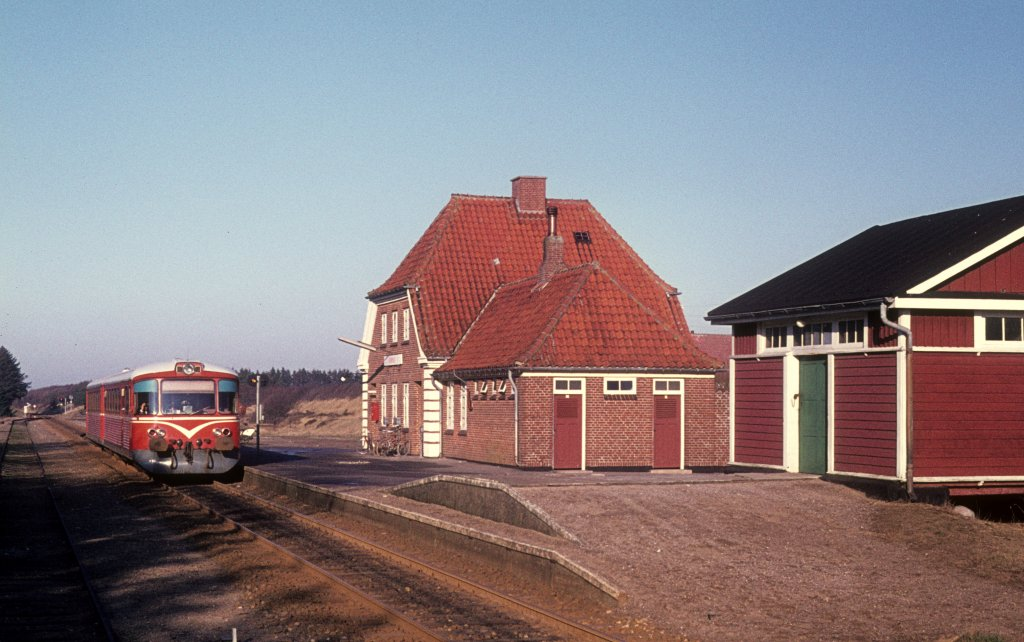
Horne railway station

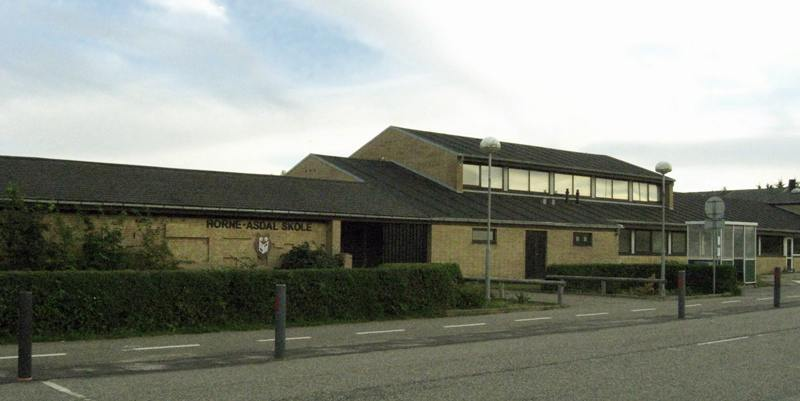
Asdal Horne School
