= Culberson County Airport =

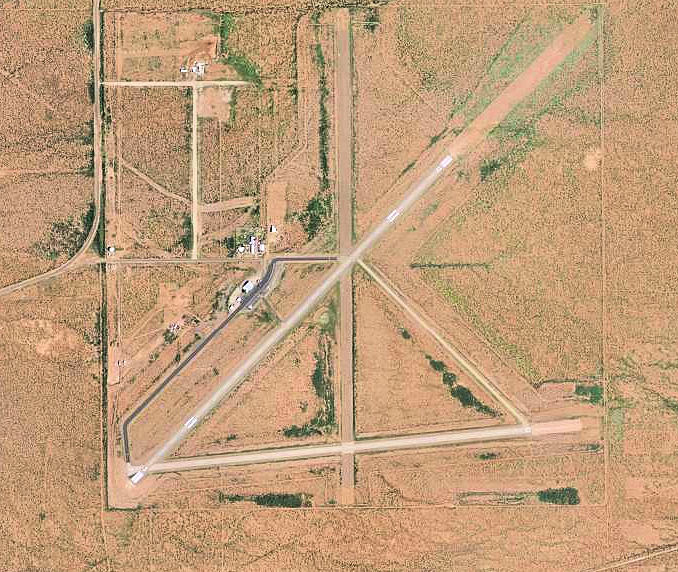
- 2006 USGS Airphoto
- IATA: VHN; ICAO: KVHN; FAA LID: VHN

Summary
- Airport type: Public
- Owner: Culberson County
- Location: Culberson County, near Van Horn, Texas
- Elevation AMSL: 3,957 ft (1,206 m)
- Coordinates: 31°03′28″N 104°47′02″W

Map
- Location of Culberson County Airport

Runways
Direction	Length		Surface
Direction	ft	m	Surface
3/21	6,005	1,830	Asphalt
7/25	5,353	1,632	Asphalt

Statistics (2024)
- Aircraft operations (year ending 3/11/2024): 3,480
- Source: Federal Aviation Administration

Culberson County Airport (IATA: VHN, ICAO: KVHN, FAA LID: VHN) is a county-owned public-use airport located three miles (5 km) northeast of the central business district of Van Horn, a town in Culberson County, Texas, United States.

== Facilities and aircraft ==
Culberson County Airport covers an area of 1,000 acres (405 ha) which contains two asphalt paved runways: 3/21 measuring 6,005 x 76 ft. (1,830 x 23 m) and 7/25 measuring 5,353 x 75 ft. (1,632 x 23 m).

For the 12-month period ending March 11, 2024, the airport had 3,480 aircraft operations, average 67 per week; 89% general aviation and 10% military.

== History ==
During World War II the airfield was used by the United States Army Air Forces

== See also ==
- Texas World War II Army Airfields
- List of airports in Texas
