= Van Horn House =

Van Horn House may refer to:

- David and Cornelius Van Horn House, Closter, New Jersey, listed on the NRHP in Bergen County
- Van Horn–Newcomb House, Englewood, New Jersey, listed on the NRHP in Bergen County
- Hopper–Van Horn House, Mahway, New Jersey, listed on the NRHP in Bergen County
- Van Horn–Ackerman House, Wyckoff, New Jersey, listed on the NRHP in Bergen County

== See also ==
- Van Horn Mansion, Newfane, New York, listed on the NRHP in Niagara County
- Van Horn Building, Carrollton, Ohio, listed on the NRHP in Carroll County
- Horn House (disambiguation)
