= 't Wapen van Hoorn =

Dutch East India Company fluyt

History

Dutch Republic
- Owner: Dutch East India Company
- Launched: 1619

General characteristics
- Type: Fluyt
- Tons burthen: ~500 tons

't Wapen van Hoorn (Dutch for "The Arms of Hoorn") was a 17th-century Dutch East India Company fluyt with a tonnage between 400 and 600, built in the Dutch Republic in 1619. During its second voyage it grounded on the west coast of Australia, making it about the tenth ship to make landfall on Australian soil, and following Tryall just a few weeks earlier only the second ship to be shipwrecked in Australian waters, albeit temporarily.

== Voyages ==
't Wapen van Hoorn departed Texel for Batavia, capital of the Dutch East Indies, on 27 December 1619, under the command of Roelof Pietersz. It arrived at the Cape of Good Hope on 5 July 1620, and reached Batavia on 8 December 1620. It then returned to Texel, leaving Batavia on 7 January 1621, and arriving on 17 July 1621.

She departed on her second voyage to Batavia on 26 December 1621. In June 1622 "at night in a hard wind", the ship ran aground near Shark Bay in what is now Western Australia. It was eventually refloated, and arrived in Batavia on 22 July 1622. It departed Batavia under Captain Pieter Gerritsz. Bierenbroodspot on 25 December 1625. It stayed at the Cape of Good Hope from 21 January to 9 February 1626, reaching Texel on 9 July.

Her final departure to Batavia was on 19 February 1627, under the command of David Pieterszoon de Vries. It stayed at the Cape of Good Hope from 16 July to 7 August. In September it made landfall at Shark Bay, noting corrections to Dirk Hartog's chart of the location. It arrived at Batavia on 13 October. It appears to have remained mostly in the Indies from then on, but is named as one of the ships that participated in the Battle of Abrolhos on 12 September 1631 off Pernambuco (present-day Brazil).

== Sources ==
- Bruijn, J. R; et al. (1979). Dutch–Asiatic shipping in the 17th and 18th centuries. Nijhoff. ISBN 9789024722709.
- Henderson, G. (2007). Unfinished Voyages: Western Australian shipwrecks, 1622–1850. UWA Press. ISBN 9781920694883.
