= Frederik Winkel-Horn =

Danish writer (1756–1837)

Frederik Winkel-Horn, born Frederik Horn (12 November 1756 in Copenhagen – 19 May 1837), Danish writer.

From 1812, he called himself Winkel-Horn.

== Works ==
- Adams og Evas Morgensang, 1787
- Verdensalt, 1834
- Min aandige Skjerv, 1837
