= The Horns (song) =

Single by DJ Katch featuring Greg Nice, Deborah Lee and DJ Kool
- Released: November 27, 2015
- Recorded: 2015
- Genre: Dancehall; hip hop
- Length: 3:32 (Radio remix)
- Label: WePLAY Music and Management
- Songwriter(s): Christoph Bauss; John Bowman; Fridolin Walcher; Katch 22

"The Horns" is a 2015 song by DJ Katch. The remix version of the song features Greg Nice, DJ Kool and Deborah Lee.

== Music video ==
The music video was uploaded on November 17, 2015 by WePLAY Music and Management.

== Track listing ==
Digital download
No.	Title	Length
1.	"The Horns [Radio Remix]" (feat. Greg Nice, DJ Kool & Deborah Lee)	3:32
2.	"The Horns [Remix]" (feat. Greg Nice & DJ Kool)	3:33
3.	"The Horns"	3:14

== Charts ==
Chart (2015)	Peak position
Austria (Ö3 Austria Top 40)	68
Germany (GfK)	60
Italy (FIMI)	17
