= Horn House (Decorah, Iowa) =

Historic house in Iowa, United States

- U.S. National Register of Historic Places
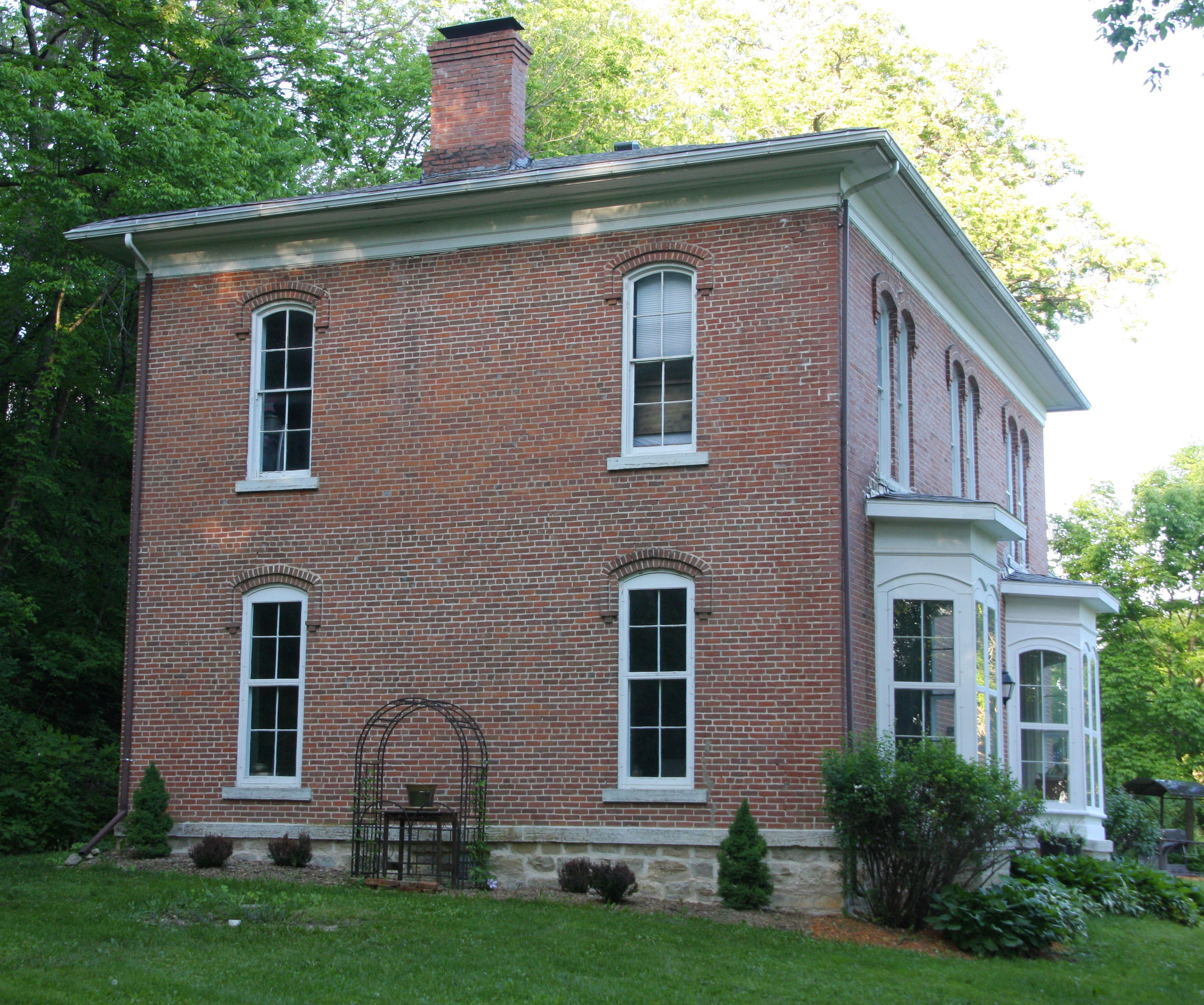
- The Horn House in 2017

- Location within Iowa Location within the United States
- Location: Northwest of Decorah
- Coordinates: 43°20′39″N 91°49′30″W
- Built: 1869
- Built by: Robinson & Arboe
- Architectural style: Italianate
- NRHP reference No.: 77000568
- Added to NRHP: March 25, 1977

The Horn House is a historic residence located northwest of Decorah, Iowa, United States. The significance of this house is the unique architectural combination of the Italianate and Georgian styles found in Iowa. The latter style is found in the symmetrical composition of the attached service wing. The two-story brick main block features a low-hipped roof, wide eaves and a plain wood cornice.

The house was built by Henry Harcourt Horn, a native of Hertfordshire who was part of the English Colony in the Decorah area. The colony was established in the early 1860s, principally by well-to-do Englishmen who tried to become gentleman farmers. Most of them, including Horn, failed. Horn moved into Decorah and tried his hand in a variety of businesses. He had to file for bankruptcy and lost his house in a sheriff's sale. He relocated to St. Paul, Minnesota where he took up a law career.

The house was listed on the National Register of Historic Places in 1977.
