= Horne railway station =

Railway station in North Jutland, Denmark

Horne
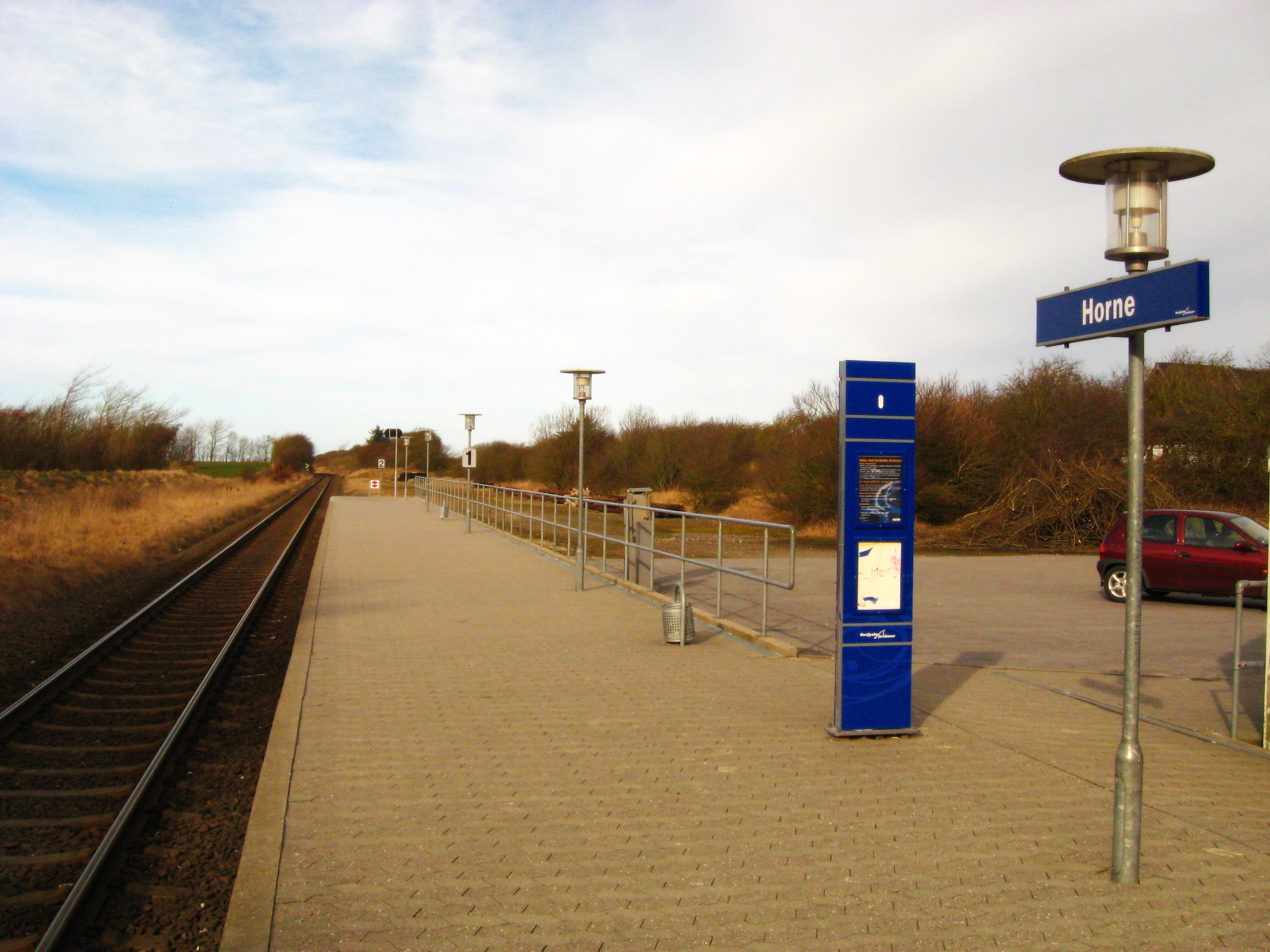
- Horne station in 2009

General information
- Location: Nøragervej 5 Horne, 9850 Hirtshals; Hjørring Municipality; Denmark
- Coordinates: 57°33′34″N 9°58′21″E
- Elevation: 38.8 metres (127 ft)
- System: railway station
- Owner: Nordjyske Jernbaner
- Line: Hirtshals Line
- Platforms: 1
- Tracks: 1
- Train operators: Nordjyske Jernbaner

Construction
- Architect: Sylvius Knutzen

Services
Preceding station	Nordjyske Jernbaner	Following station
Tornby towards Hjørring	Hjørring – Hirtshals Local train	Emmersbæk towards Hirtshals
Tornby towards Skørping	Skørping – Hirtshals Regional train Peak hours	Emmersbæk towards Hirtshals
Location
- Location within Denmark Location within North Jutland Region

Horne railway station is a railway station located about 1 km (0.62 mi) west of the village of Horne between Hirtshals and Hjørring in Vendsyssel, Denmark.

The station is located on the Hirtshals Line between Hirtshals and Hjørring. It opened in 1925. The train services are currently operated by Nordjyske Jernbaner which run frequent local train services between Hirtshals and Hjørring with onward connections from Hjørring to the rest of Denmark.

== History ==
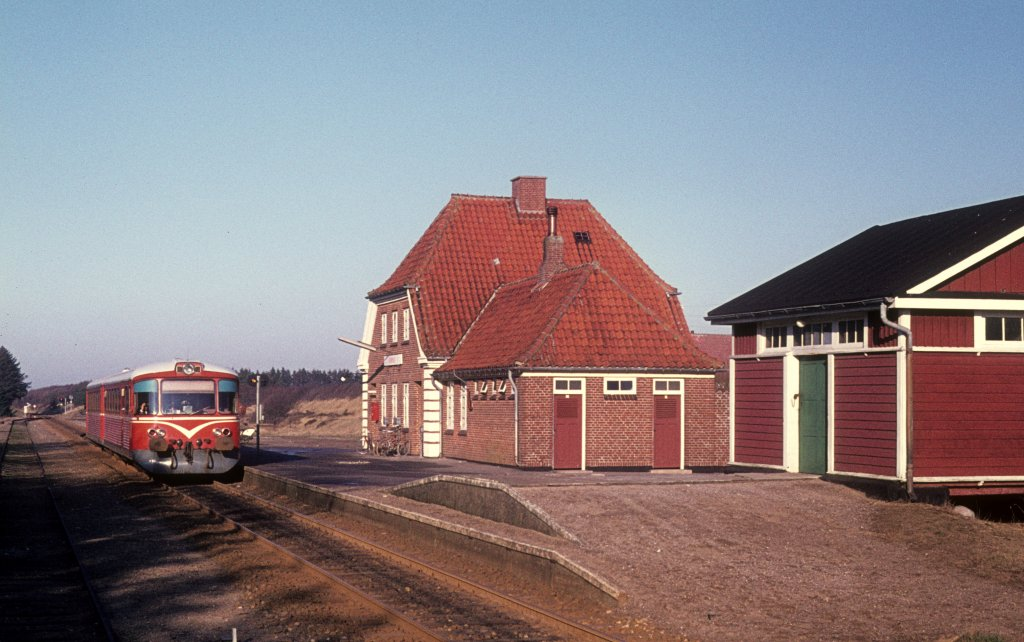
Horne station in 1975

The station opened in 1925. The station was closed in 1970 but continued as a halt.

== Architecture ==
The station building from 1925 was designed by the Danish architect Sylvius Knutzen.

== Operations ==
The train services are currently operated by Nordjyske Jernbaner which run frequent local train services between Hirtshals and Hjørring with onward connections from Hjørring to the rest of Denmark.

== See also ==
- List of railway stations in Denmark
- Rail transport in Denmark
