= Van Horn High School (Texas) =

Location
- 200 West 7th Street; Van Horn, Texas 79855-0899; United States; 31.047528°N 104.834262°W

Information
- School type: Public high school
- School district: Culberson County-Allamoore Independent School District
- Grades: K-12
- Enrollment: 393 (2023-2024)
- Colors: Red & Grey
- Athletics conference: UIL Class A
- Mascot: Eagles/Lady Eagles
- Website: Van Horn High School

Van Horn High School is a public high school located in Van Horn, Texas (USA) and classified as a 1A school by the UIL. It is part of the Culberson County-Allamoore Independent School District located in southwest Culberson County and serves students countywide. In 2015, the school was rated "Met Standard" by the Texas Education Agency.

== Athletics ==
The Van Horn Eagles compete in the following sports:

- Baseball
- Basketball
- Cross Country
- Six-man football
- Golf
- Softball
- Tennis
- Track and Field
- Volleyball

=== Eagle Field ===
In 2014, Van Horn High School replaced their old grass football field with a new stadium that included a Matrix Synthetic Turf system and an Epic Tracks V300 400 meter track. The construction also included a new field house complete with weight room. The cost of the project, according to various sources, was somewhere between $4.2 and $6 million.

=== State Titles ===
- Baseball
  - 1991(2A)
- Boys Basketball
  - 1971(1A)
- One Act Play
  - 1983(2A)
- Girls Track & Field
  - 2014(1A Div 1)
- UIL Calculator Applications
  - 1989-90 (2A)-Keith Taylor
  - 1990-91 (2A)-Keith Taylor
