= The Horns, Bull's Green =

Pub in Datchworth, Hertfordshire, England

Coordinates: 51°50′27″N 0°09′23″W

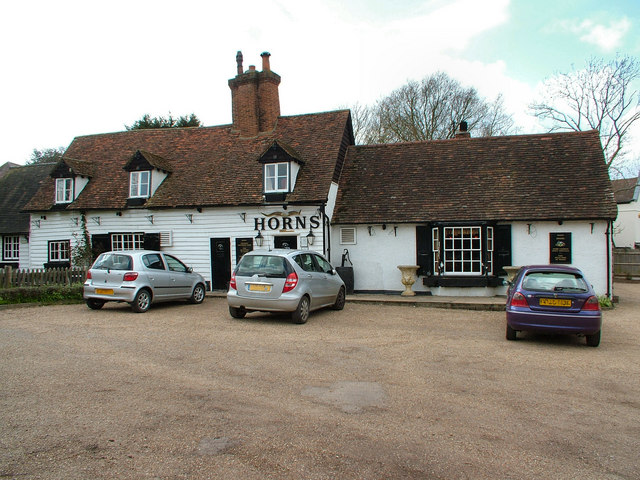
The Horns

The Horns is a pub in Bull's Green, in the civil parish of Datchworth, in the East Hertfordshire district, in the county of Hertfordshire, England. It is situated on Bramfield Road.

== Architecture ==
The building has a timber frame on a brick base. It is Grade II listed and dates from the early sixteenth century.
