= Van Horn, Texas =

- Town
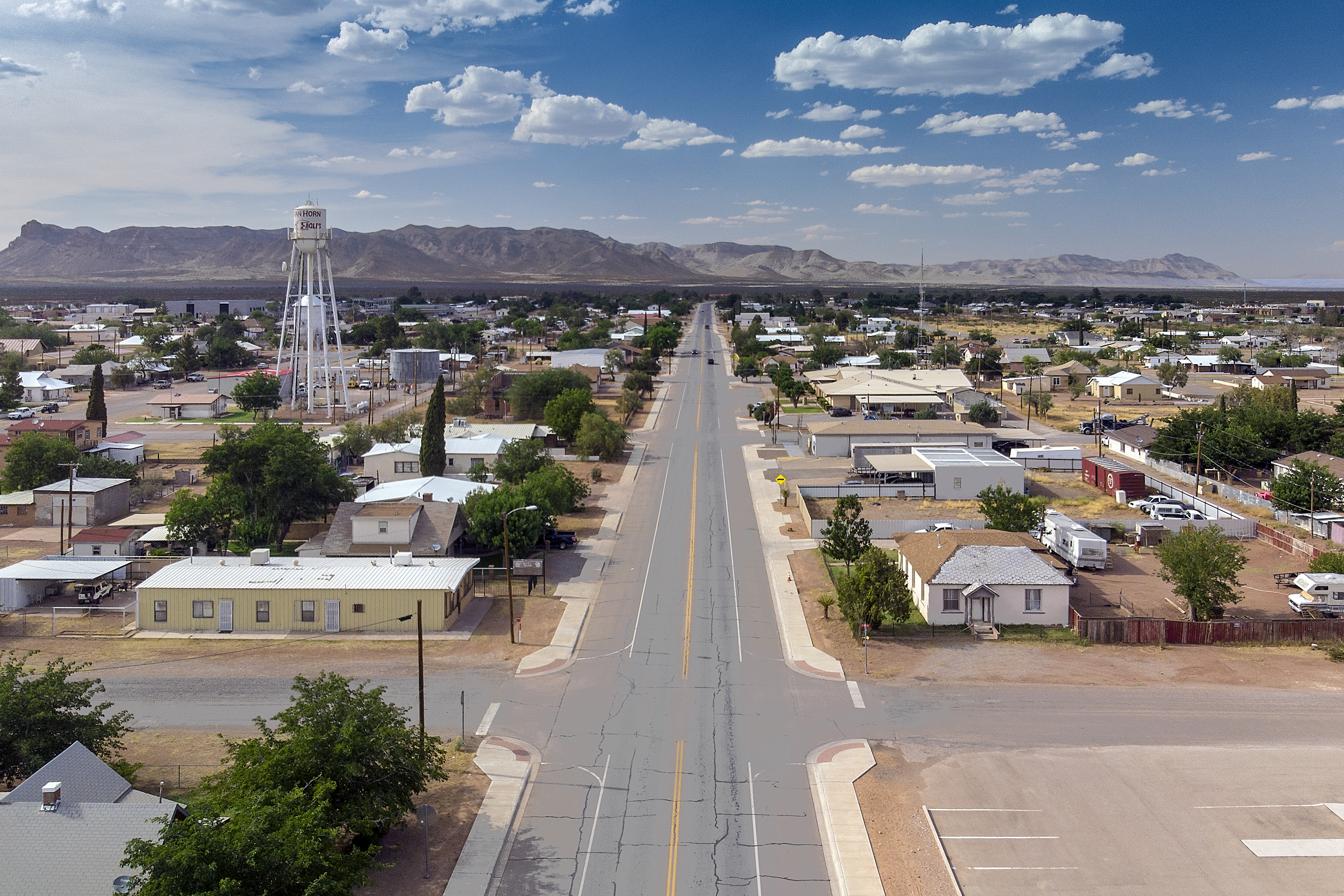
- Van Horn in 2018

- Location of Van Horn in Texas and the US Van Horn (the United States)
- Coordinates: 31°2′33″N 104°49′59″W
- Country: United States
- State: Texas
- County: Culberson

Area
  - Total: 2.84 sq mi (7.35 km^{2})
  - Land: 2.84 sq mi (7.35 km^{2})
  - Water: 0 sq mi (0.00 km^{2})
- Elevation: 4,042 ft (1,232 m)

Population (2020)
  - Total: 1,941
  - Density: 684.0/sq mi (264.08/km^{2})
- Time zone: UTC−6 (Central (CST))
  - Summer (DST): UTC−5 (CDT)
- ZIP Code: 79855
- Area code: 432
- FIPS code: 48-75032
- GNIS feature ID: 1370571
- Website: www.vanhorntexas.org

Van Horn is a town in and the county seat of Culberson County, Texas, United States. According to the 2020 census, Van Horn had a population of 1,941, down from 2,063 in the 2010 census and 2,435 at the 2000 census. Van Horn's official newspaper is The Van Horn Advocate. The town is the westernmost incorporated community in the United States that uses the Central Time Zone, located at the same longitude as Cheyenne, Wyoming, and Colorado Springs, Colorado. Its earliest sunset in the beginning of December is the latest among incorporated towns in the United States, occurring no earlier than 5:56 pm.

== History ==
Anglo-Texan settlement began in the late 1850s and early 1860s supportive of the San Antonio-El Paso Overland Mail route. Although U.S. Army Major Jefferson Van Horne is believed to have passed near the area in 1849 on his way to take command of what would later become Fort Bliss, the town is instead named for Lieutenant James Judson Van Horn, who commanded an army garrison at the Van Horn Wells beginning in 1859. Lieutenant Van Horn's command was relatively short-lived, as the post was seized by Confederate forces in 1861 and Lieutenant Van Horn was taken prisoner. Settlement was further stimulated by the construction of the Texas and Pacific Railway in 1881. The town has several buildings on the National Register of Historic Places, including the First Presbyterian Church (now Primera Iglesia Bautista), built in 1901.

== Geography ==
Van Horn is located in southwestern Culberson County at 31°2′33″N 104°49′59″W (31.042489, –104.832928). Interstate 10 passes through the town, leading east 120 miles (190 km) to Fort Stockton and northwest 118 miles (190 km) to El Paso. Van Horn is the western terminus of U.S. Route 90; from Van Horn, it leads southeast 73 miles (117 km) to Marfa. Texas State Highway 54 leads north from Van Horn 65 miles (105 km) to Pine Springs and the Guadalupe Mountains.

According to the United States Census Bureau, the town has a total area of 2.8 square miles (7.3 km^{2}), all land. Threemile Peak, elevation 4,868 feet (1,484 m), rises to the northwest overlooking the town.

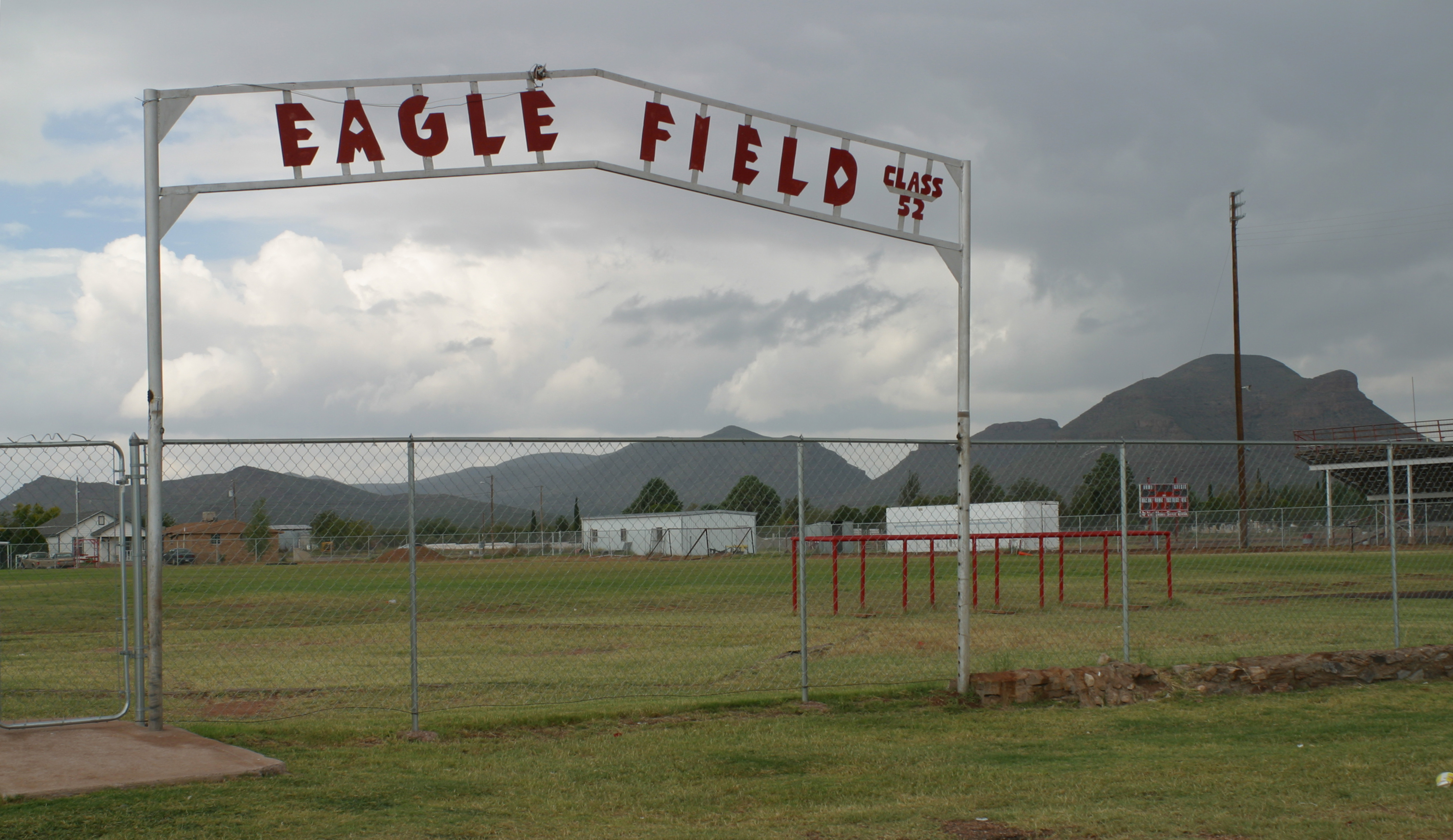
The old Eagle Field, before the 2014 construction of the new stadium, with Threemile Peak in the background

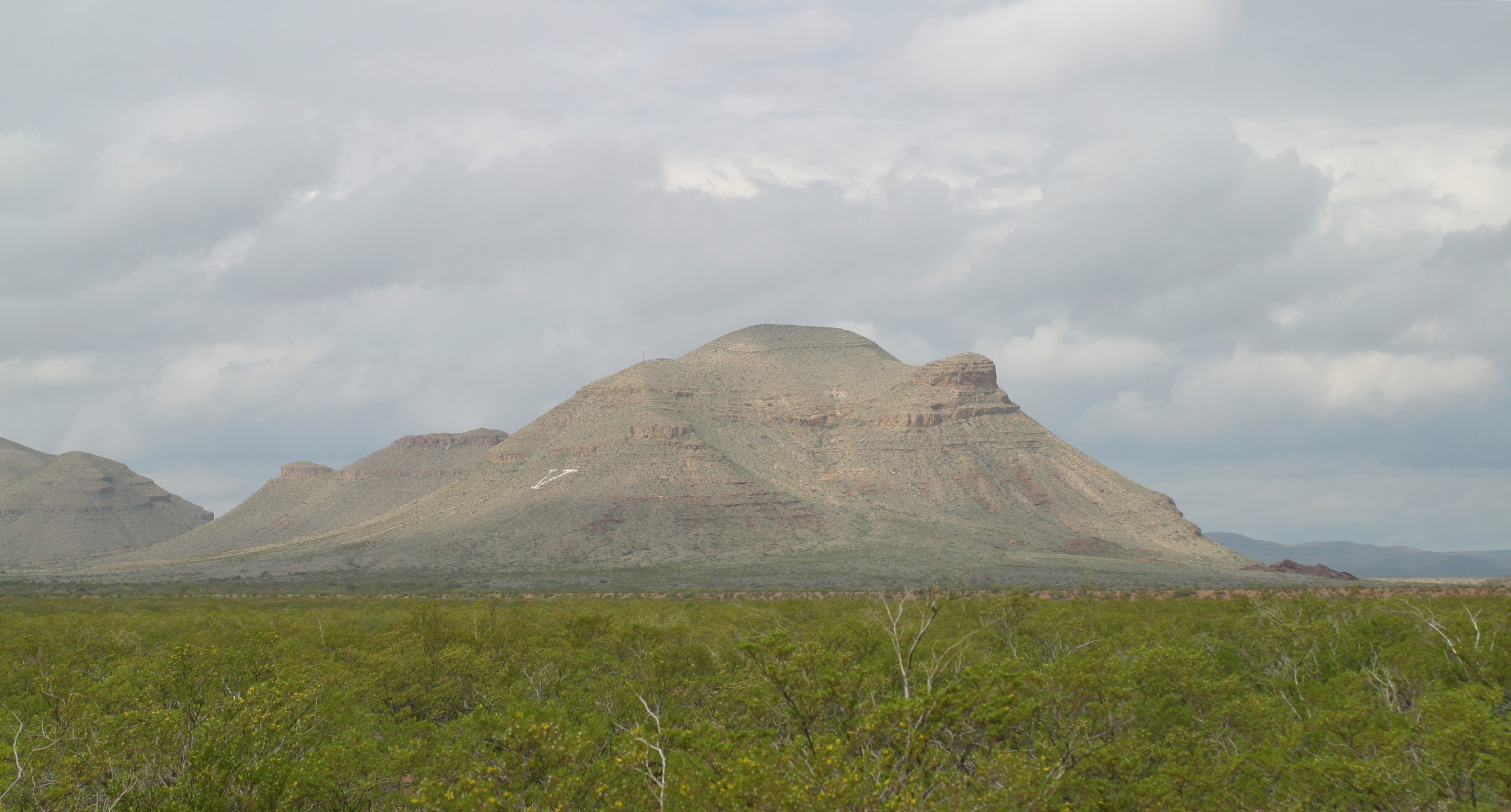
Threemile Peak, with a white "V" for Van Horn on it

=== Climate ===
Climate data for Van Horn, Texas (1991–2020 normals, extremes 1942–present)
Month	Jan	Feb	Mar	Apr	May	Jun	Jul	Aug	Sep	Oct	Nov	Dec	Year
Record high °F (°C)	80 (27)	88 (31)	94 (34)	100 (38)	105 (41)	112 (44)	108 (42)	108 (42)	104 (40)	98 (37)	87 (31)	82 (28)	112 (44)
Mean daily maximum °F (°C)	59.1 (15.1)	64.2 (17.9)	71.6 (22.0)	78.8 (26.0)	86.6 (30.3)	94.5 (34.7)	92.9 (33.8)	91.9 (33.3)	85.9 (29.9)	78.7 (25.9)	68.1 (20.1)	59.2 (15.1)	77.6 (25.3)
Daily mean °F (°C)	44.6 (7.0)	49.0 (9.4)	56.1 (13.4)	63.4 (17.4)	71.9 (22.2)	80.4 (26.9)	80.6 (27.0)	79.5 (26.4)	73.3 (22.9)	64.3 (17.9)	53.2 (11.8)	45.1 (7.3)	63.4 (17.4)
Mean daily minimum °F (°C)	30.0 (−1.1)	33.8 (1.0)	40.6 (4.8)	47.9 (8.8)	57.3 (14.1)	66.4 (19.1)	68.3 (20.2)	67.1 (19.5)	60.6 (15.9)	49.8 (9.9)	38.3 (3.5)	30.9 (−0.6)	49.2 (9.6)
Record low °F (°C)	−7 (−22)	−3 (−19)	9 (−13)	24 (−4)	31 (−1)	45 (7)	53 (12)	48 (9)	33 (1)	19 (−7)	10 (−12)	0 (−18)	−7 (−22)
Average precipitation inches (mm)	0.47 (12)	0.44 (11)	0.25 (6.4)	0.22 (5.6)	0.49 (12)	1.10 (28)	2.05 (52)	1.95 (50)	1.50 (38)	0.94 (24)	0.42 (11)	0.49 (12)	10.32 (262)
Average snowfall inches (cm)	0.7 (1.8)	0.6 (1.5)	0.2 (0.51)	0.0 (0.0)	0.0 (0.0)	0.0 (0.0)	0.0 (0.0)	0.0 (0.0)	0.0 (0.0)	0.1 (0.25)	0.5 (1.3)	1.2 (3.0)	3.3 (8.4)
Average precipitation days (≥ 0.01 in)	2.8	2.7	1.9	1.6	3.1	4.4	7.5	7.8	5.7	4.1	2.5	2.8	46.9
Average snowy days (≥ 0.1 in)	0.4	0.2	0.1	0.0	0.0	0.0	0.0	0.0	0.0	0.0	0.2	0.5	1.4
Source: NOAA

== Demographics ==
Historical population
Census	Pop.	Note	%±
1890	450		—
1900	30		−93.3%
1910	500		1,566.7%
1920	800		60.0%
1930	1,600		100.0%
1940	2,070		29.4%
1950	1,161		−43.9%
1960	1,953		68.2%
1970	2,889		47.9%
1980	2,772		−4.0%
1990	2,930		5.7%
2000	2,435		−16.9%
2010	2,063		−15.3%
2020	1,941		−5.9%
U.S. Decennial Census

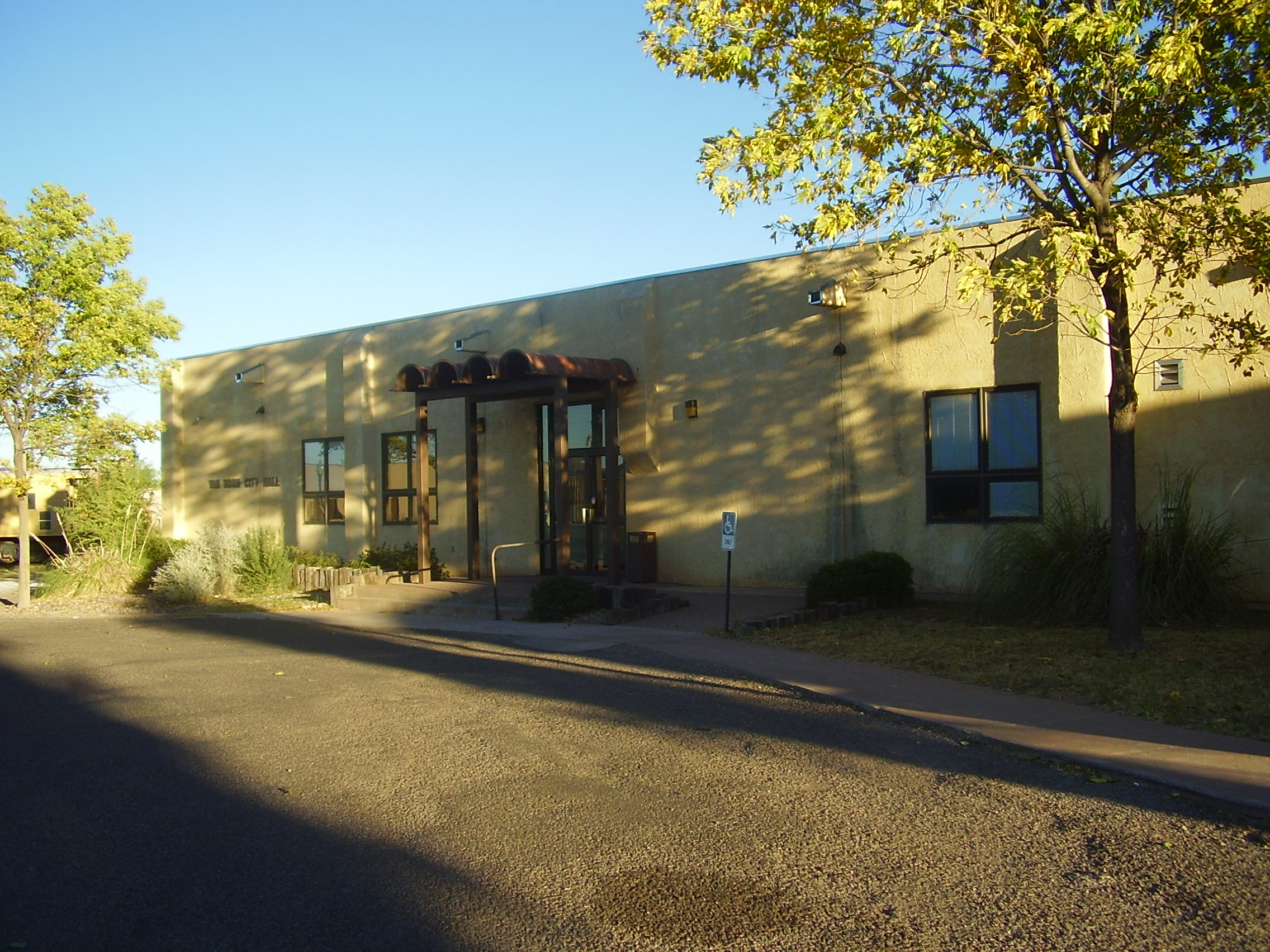
Van Horn City Hall

=== 2020 census ===
Van Horn racial composition (NH = Non-Hispanic) (Note: Note: the US Census treats Hispanic/Latino as an ethnic category. This table excludes Latinos from the racial categories and assigns them to a separate category. Hispanics/Latinos can be of any race.)
Race	Number	Percentage
White (NH)	347	17.88%
Black or African American (NH)	14	0.72%
Native American or Alaska Native (NH)	11	0.57%
Asian (NH)	25	1.29%
Some other race (NH)	3	0.15%
Multiracial (NH)	33	1.7%
Hispanic or Latino	1,508	77.69%
Total	1,941	

As of the 2020 United States census, 1,941 people, 607 households, and 339 families were residing in the town.

=== 2000 census ===
As of the 2000 census, 2,435 people, 834 households, and 652 families lived in the town. The population density was 846.9 inhabitants per square mile (327.0/km^{2}). The 976 housing units averaged 339.5 per square mile (130.8/km^{2}). The racial makeup of the town was 64.6% White, 0.7% African American, 0.6% Native American, 0.6% Asian, 31.5% from other races, and 2.1% from two or more races. Hispanics or Latinos of any race were 78.6% of the population.

== Government ==
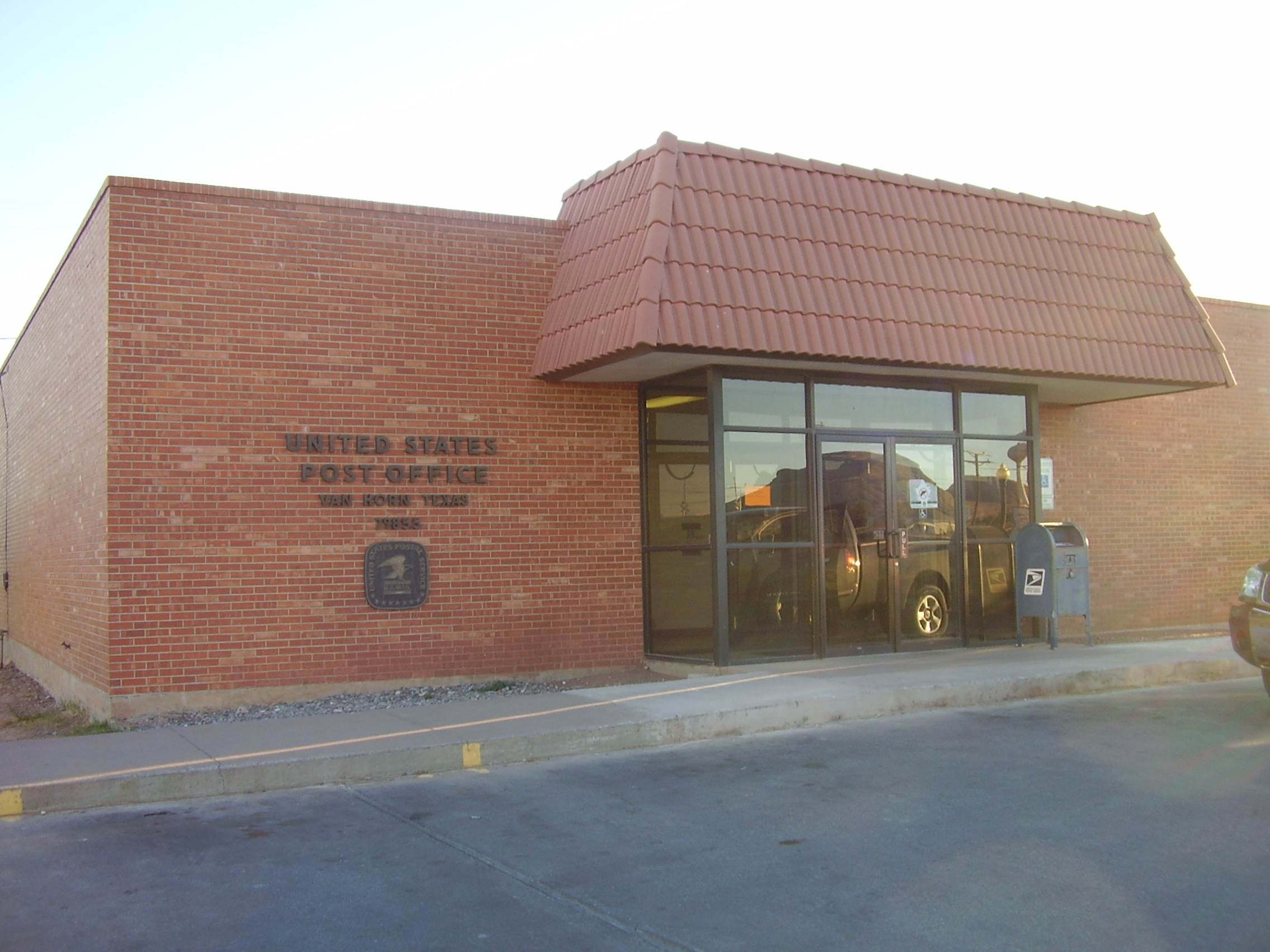
Van Horn Post Office

The United States Postal Service operates the Van Horn Post Office.

== Education ==
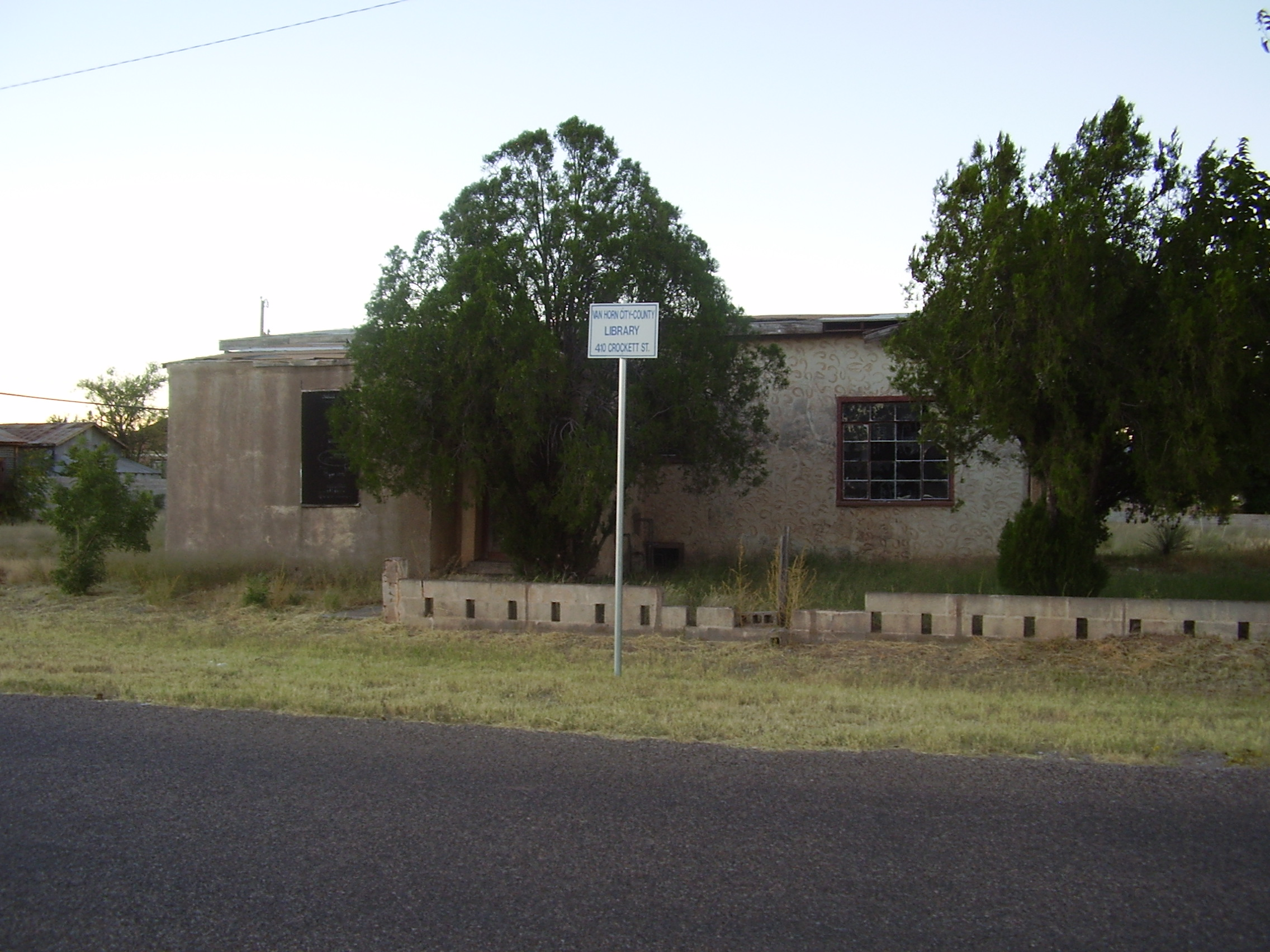
Van Horn City-County Library

Van Horn is served by the Culberson County-Allamoore Independent School District and is home to the Van Horn High School Eagles.

== Transportation ==
=== Major highways ===
- I-10: Interstate Highway 10 runs along the south side of town, leading west 117 miles (188 km) to El Paso and east 430 miles (692 km) to San Antonio. The western terminus of I-20 can also be accessed 47 miles (76 km) to the east.
- SH 54: Texas State Highway 54 runs north from town, initially following La Caverna Street, leading 55 miles (89 km) north to intersect with U.S. Route 62 and access to Guadalupe Mountains National Park.
- US 90: U.S. Route 90 has its western terminus at West Broadway Street. (signed Bus. I-10-D/former US 80). It initially follows Van Horn Drive south out of town, leading southeast 74 miles (119 km) to Marfa and ultimately meeting back up with I-10 455 miles (732 km) away in San Antonio.

=== Rail ===
- Union Pacific Railroad

=== Bus ===
- Greyhound Lines stops at a Super 8 at the west end of Bus. I-10-D.

=== Airports ===
- El Paso International Airport is the airport with the closest commercial airline service, 116 miles (187 km) to the northwest.
- Culberson County Airport is a county-owned, public-use airport 3 miles (5 km) to the northeast.

== Space tourism ==
In late 2006, The Wall Street Journal reported that Jeff Bezos, founder and CEO of Amazon, had acquired 290,000 acres (1,200 km^{2}) of land 25 miles (40 km) north of Van Horn, including the Figure 2 Ranch Airport, to house his fledgling space tourism company, Blue Origin. A 2006 article on Space.com reported that Blue Origin was expected to start commercial operations as early as 2010, aiming for 52 launches per year from the Van Horn facility. This spaceport is named Corn Ranch.

In early 2010, NASA awarded Blue Origin US$3.7 million to work on an advanced technology, which detaches a crew cabin from its launcher if the shuttle malfunctions.

An August 2016 update reported Blue Origin was still conducting test flights with plans to begin flying piloted tests in 2017 and paying customers in 2018. Blue Origin's actual first human launch from, and return to, Van Horn occurred on the morning of July 20, 2021, with a crew of four people.

== 10,000-year clock ==
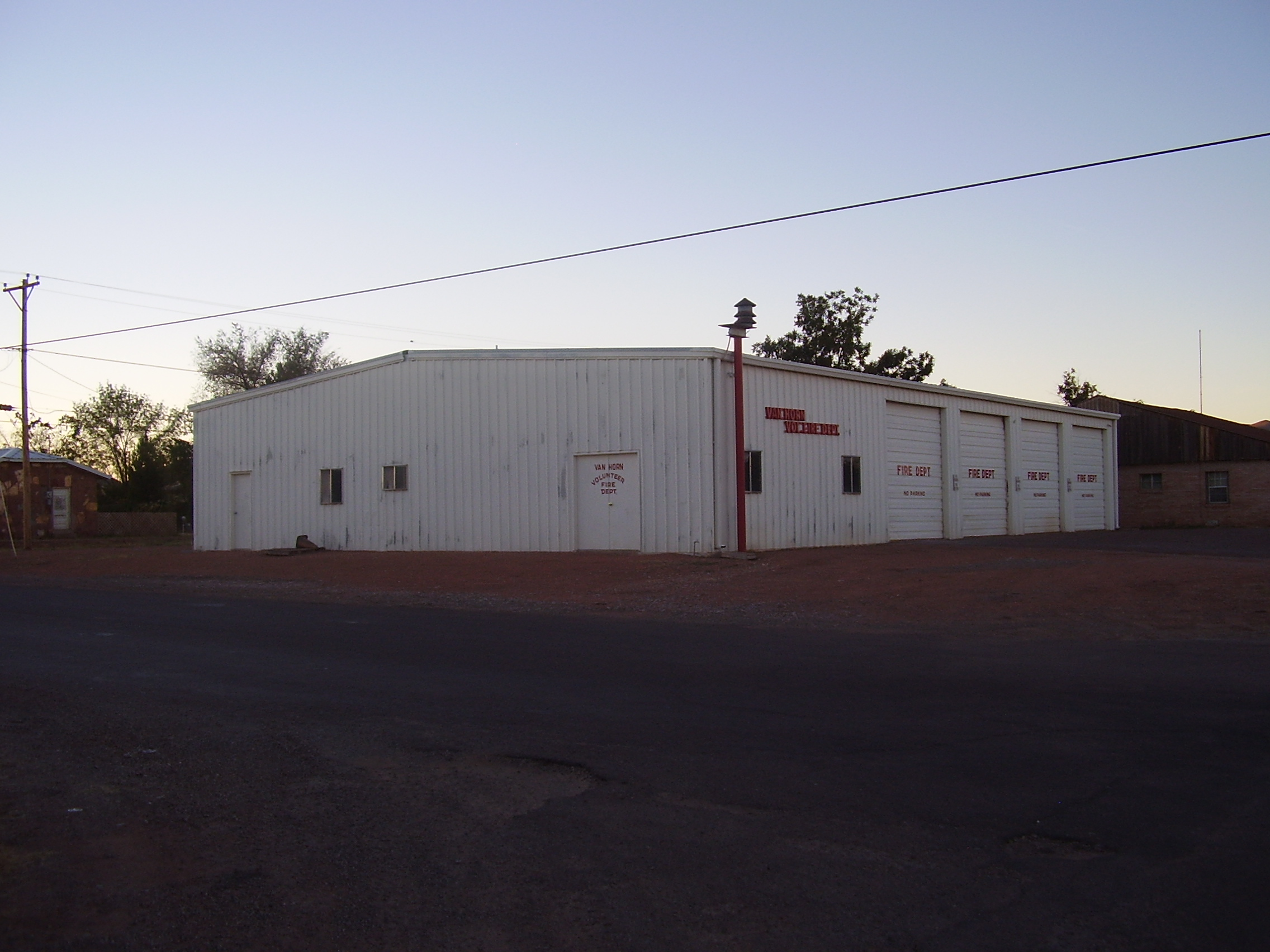
Van Horn Volunteer Fire Department

In 2009, the Van Horn Advocate announced that the Long Now Foundation was starting geologic testing for an underground space to house a 10,000-year Clock of the Long Now, on the Bezos ranch, north of Van Horn.

== Popular culture ==
Van Horn provided the inspiration for the 2019 song "Van Horn" by alternative-rock band Saint Motel, which was featured on their EP The Original Motion Picture Soundtrack: Part 1 after the band spent a night there on tour.

Famed football coach John Madden put Chuy's Restaurant on the national map after a 1987 stop with his Madden Cruiser bus.

== Gallery ==
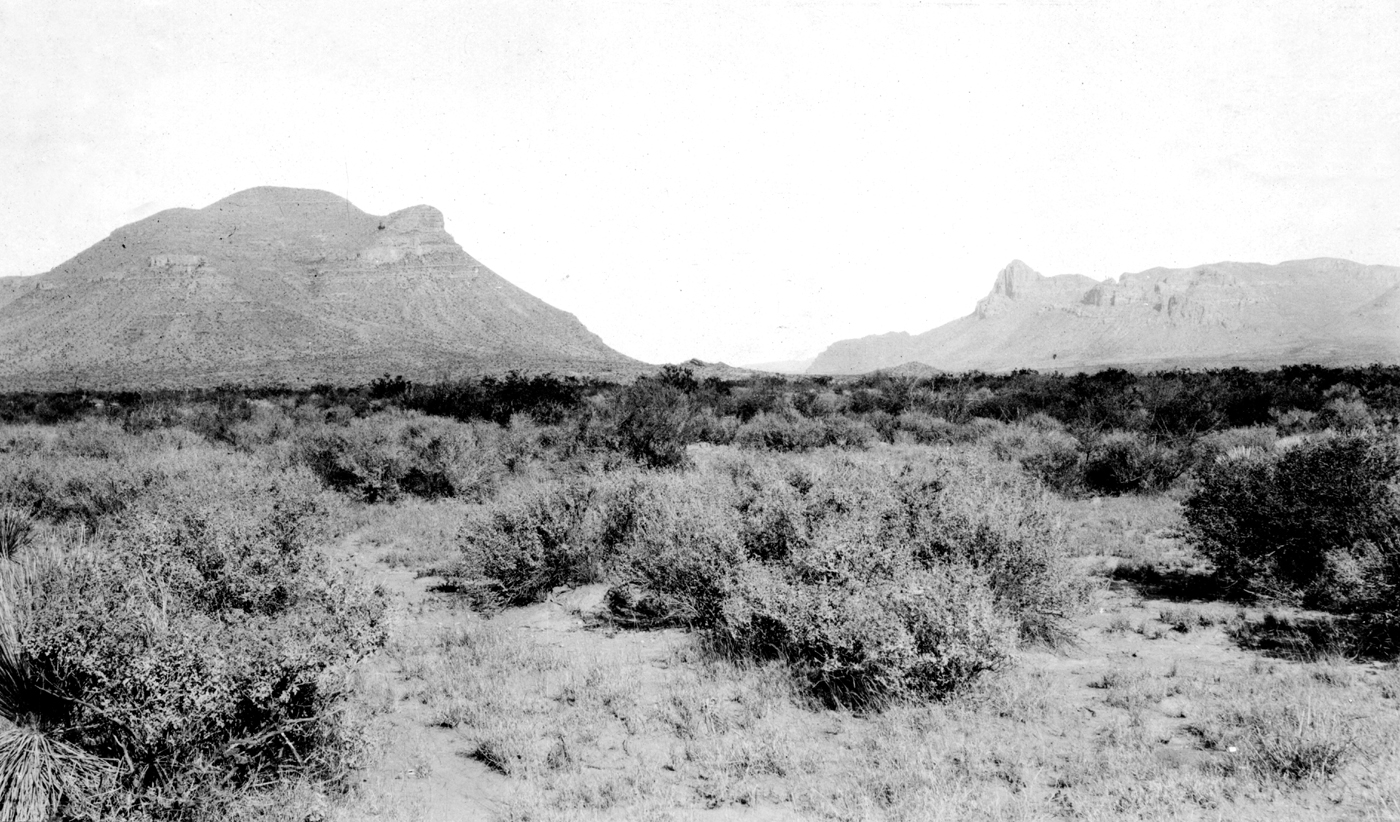
Threemile Mountain (on the left), looking northwest (USGS photo by George B. Richardson, 1913)

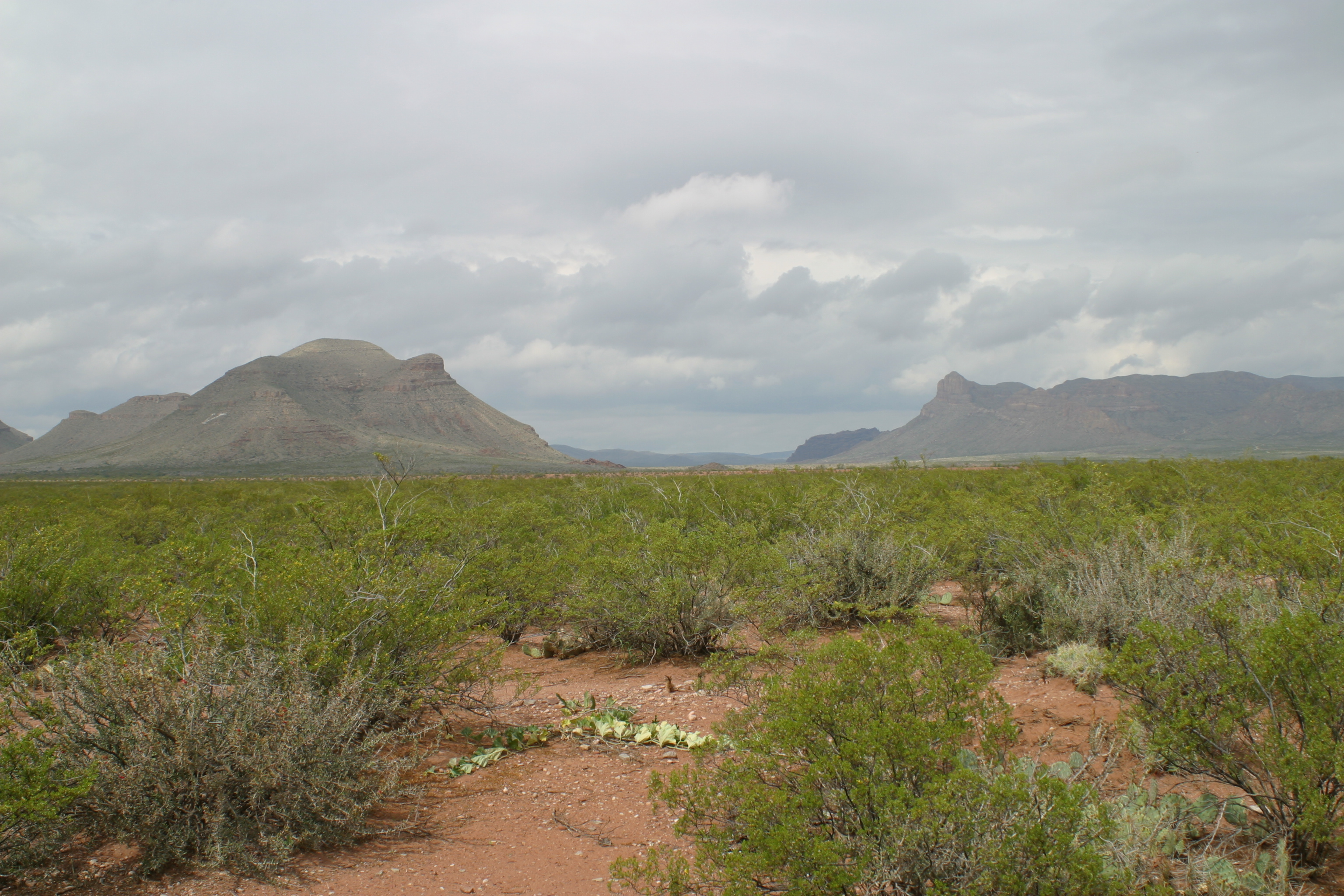
Similar view of Threemile Mountain (left) and Beach Mountains (right) in 2008

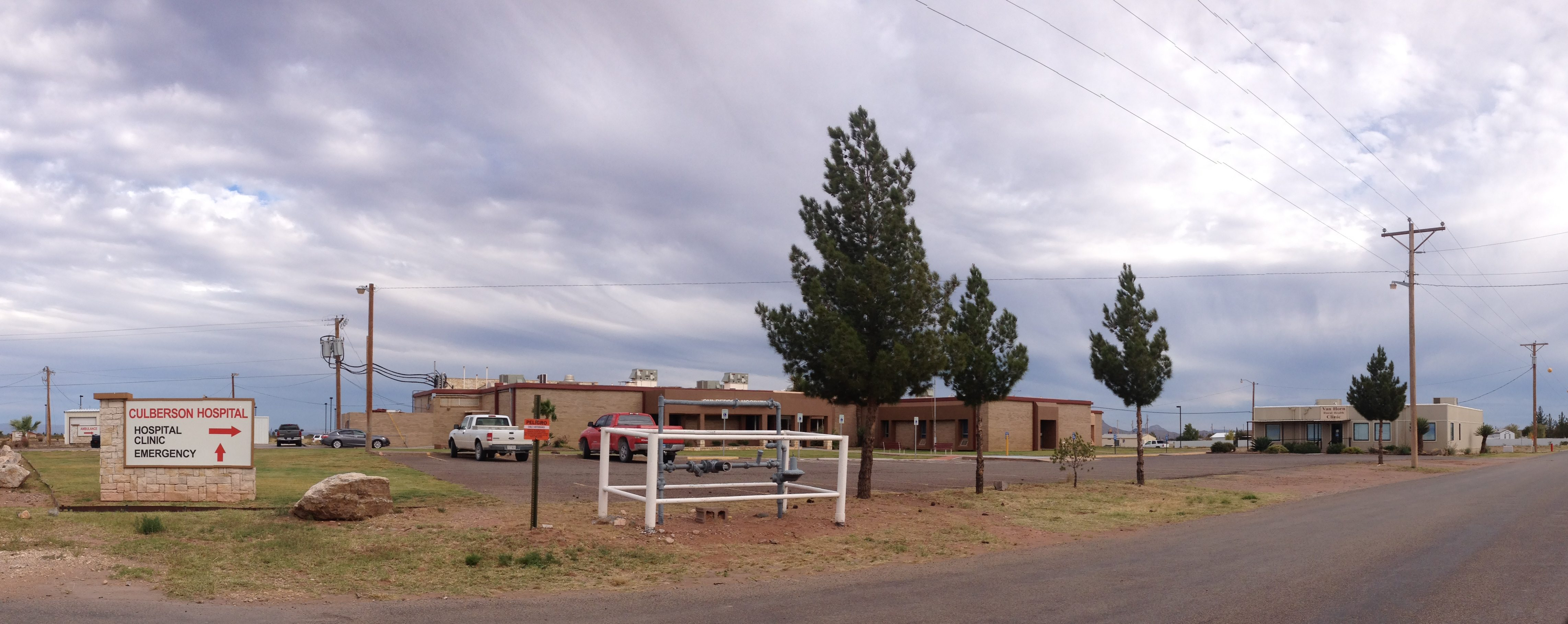
Culberson County Hospital and Van Horn Rural Health Clinic (2013)

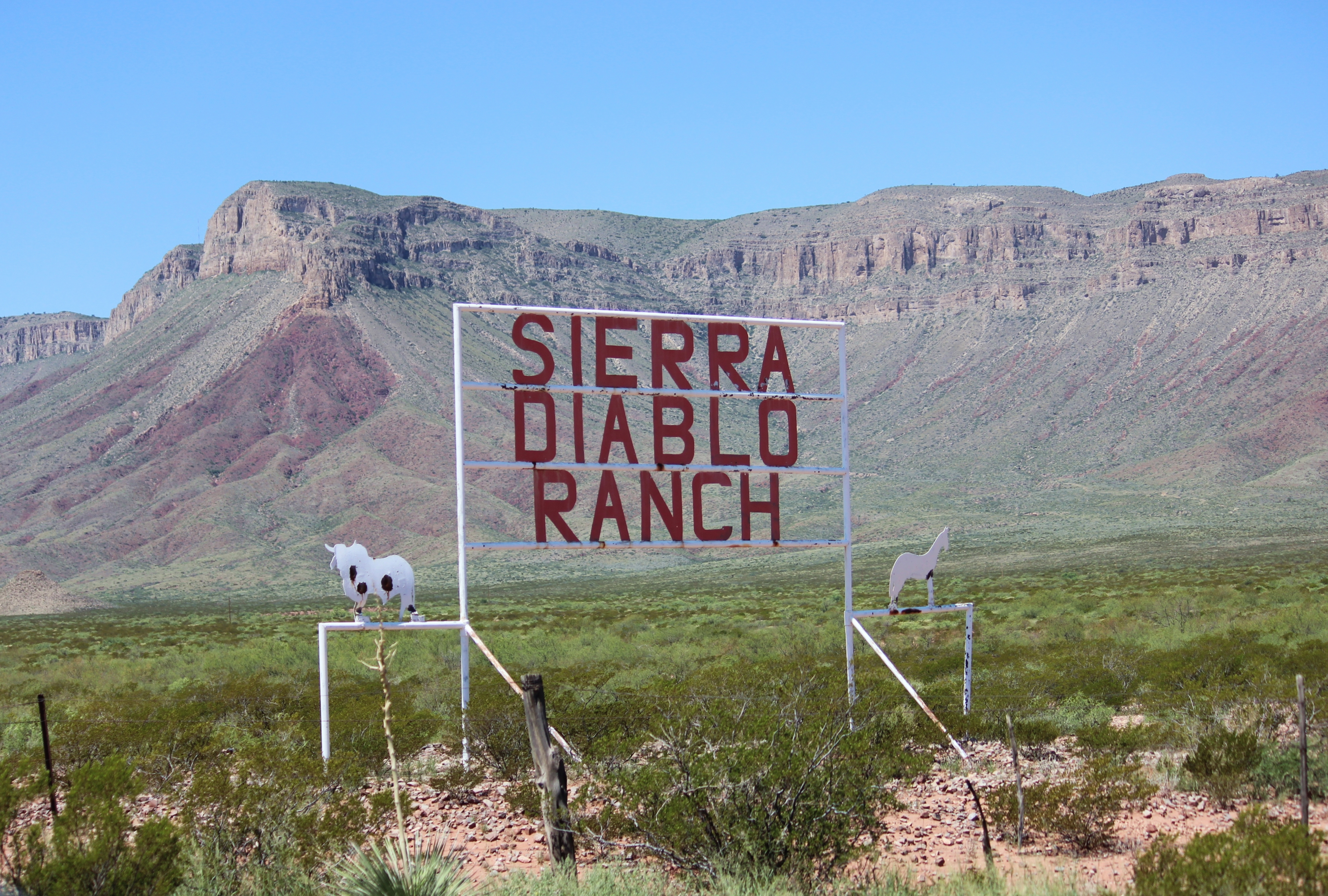
12,800 acre Sierra Diablo Ranch north of Van Horn

== See also ==
- Guadalupe Mountains National Park
- Guadalupe Mountains
- Kent, Texas
- McKittrick Canyon
- Sierra Blanca, Texas
- West Texas
- Beach Mountains
