= Pratt House =

Pratt House may refer to:

in Canada

- Pratt House, West Vancouver, British Columbia, designed by Charles Edward Pratt

in the United States

(by state then city)

- Charles H. Pratt House, Phoenix, Arizona, listed on the National Register of Historic Places (NRHP) in Mariposa County
- Charles M. Pratt House, Ojai, California, listed on the NRHP in Ventura County
- Dr. Ambrose Pratt House, Chester, Connecticut, listed on the NRHP in Middlesex County
- Pratt House (Essex, Connecticut), listed on the NRHP in Middlesex County
- James Pratt Funeral Service, Hartford, Connecticut, listed on the NRHP in Hartford County
- Clark-Pratt House, Kenton, Delaware, listed on the NRHP in Kent County
- Pratt House, Milford, Delaware, National Register of Historic Places listings in Sussex County, Delaware
- A.W. Pratt House, Iowa City, Iowa, listed on the NRHP in Johnson County
- Cottonwood Ranch, Studley, Kansas, listed on the NRHP as the John Fenton Pratt Ranch in Sheridan County
- Dexter Pratt House, Cambridge, Massachusetts, |listed on the NRHP in Middlesex County
- Pratt Historic Building, Cohasset, Massachusetts, listed on the NRHP in Norfolk County
- Miles Pratt House, Watertown, Massachusetts, listed on the NRHP in Middlesex County
- Capt. Josiah Pratt House, Foxboro, Massachusetts, listed on the NRHP in Norfolk County
- Pratt-Faxon House, Quincy, Massachusetts, listed on the NRHP in Norfolk County
- Pratt House (Reading, Massachusetts), listed on the NRHP in Middlesex County
- Stillman Pratt House, Reading, Massachusetts, listed on the NRHP in Middlesex County
- Lanphere-Pratt House, Coldwater, Michigan, listed on the NRHP in Branch County
- Pratt-Tabor House, Red Wing, Minnesota, listed on the NRHP in Goodhue County
- Spratt-Allen-Aull House, Lexington, Missouri, listed on the NRHP in Lafayette County
- Erwin Library and Pratt House, Boonville, New York, listed on the NRHP in Oneida County
- Caroline Ladd Pratt House, Brooklyn, New York
- Pratt House (Elmira, New York), listed on the NRHP in Chemung County
- John Wells Pratt House, Fulton, New York, listed on the NRHP in Oswego County
- Zadock Pratt House, Prattsville, New York, listed on the NRHP in Greene County
- Cabe-Pratt-Harris House, Hillsborough, North Carolina, listed on the NRHP in Orange County
- Wallace E. Pratt House, Salt Flat, Texas, listed on the NRHP in Culberson County
- Wallace Pratt Lodge, Gaudalupe Mountain National Park, Texas, listed on the NRHP in Culberson County
- Orson Pratt House, St. George, Utah, listed on the NRHP in Washington County
- Pratt-McDaniels-LaFlamme House, Bennington, Vermont, listed on the NRHP in Bennington County
- John A. Pratt House, Menomonee Falls, Wisconsin, listed on the NRHP in Waukesha County
- Hannah Pratt House, Waukesha, Wisconsin, listed on the NRHP in Waukesha County
