= National Register of Historic Places listings in Culberson County, Texas =

Location of Culberson County in Texas

This is a list of the National Register of Historic Places listings in Culberson County, Texas.

This is intended to be a complete list of properties and districts listed on the National Register of Historic Places in Culberson County, Texas. There are two districts and eight individual properties listed on the National Register in the county.

This National Park Service list is complete through NPS recent listings posted March 21, 2025.

== Current listings ==
The publicly disclosed locations of National Register properties and districts may be seen in a mapping service provided.

	Name on the Register	Image	Date listed	Location	City or town	Description
1	Butterfield Overland Mail Corridor	Butterfield Overland Mail Corridor	August 27, 2014 (#14000524)	400 Pine Canyon Road. (Guadalupe Mountains National Park); 31°53′36″N 104°48′57″W	Salt Flat vicinity	Extends into Hudspeth County.
2	Clark Hotel	Clark Hotel	July 19, 1979 (#79002929)	112 Broadway St. 31°02′24″N 104°49′55″W	Van Horn	Recorded Texas Historic Landmark
3	First Presbyterian Church	First Presbyterian Church	December 1, 1978 (#78002912)	Fannin and 3rd Sts. 31°02′33″N 104°50′05″W	Van Horn	Recorded Texas Historic Landmark
4	Granado Cave	Granado Cave	March 25, 1977 (#77001436)	Address restricted	Toyah	
5	Guadalupe Ranch	Guadalupe Ranch	November 21, 1978 (#78000259)	Northeast of Salt Flat in Guadalupe Mountains National Park; 31°54′27″N 104°48′00″W	Salt Flat	Frijole Ranch, also known as Guadalupe Ranch, Spring Hill Ranch and the Rader-Smith Ranch.
6	Lobo Valley Petroglyph Site	Lobo Valley Petroglyph Site	October 25, 1988 (#88002012)	Address restricted	Lobo	
7	McKittrick Canyon Archeological District, Guadalupe Mountains National Park	McKittrick Canyon Archeological District, Guadalupe Mountains National Park	September 26, 1991 (#91001381)	Guadalupe Mountains National Park; 31°58′45″N 104°45′17″W	Salt Flat	
8	Pinery Station	Pinery Station	October 9, 1974 (#74000281)	Off US 62 / US 180; 31°53′38″N 104°49′01″W	Guadalupe Mountains National Park	
9	Wallace E. Pratt House	Wallace E. Pratt House	December 15, 2011 (#11000927)	Pratt Dr. at McKittrick Rd. 31°57′29″N 104°45′32″W	Salt Flat vicinity	
10	Wallace Pratt Lodge	Wallace Pratt Lodge	March 26, 1975 (#75000154)	At junction of north and south branch of McKittrick Canyon; 31°59′01″N 104°46′50″W	Guadalupe Mountains National Park	

== See also ==
- National Register of Historic Places listings in Guadalupe Mountains National Park
- National Register of Historic Places listings in Texas
- Recorded Texas Historic Landmarks in Culberson County
