= Wallace Pratt =

American geologist (1885–1981)

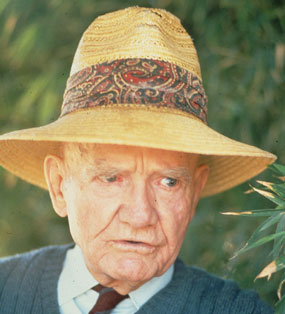

Wallace Everette Pratt (1885–1981) was a pioneer American petroleum geologist. When he started his position at Standard Oil in 1937, the company named one of their tankers after him, the SS Wallace E Pratt. He is also notable for helping establish Guadalupe Mountains National Park of West Texas and Eddy County, New Mexico through his donation of McKittrick Canyon in Salt Flat, Texas. He is also notable for his marriage to suffragist Iris Calderhead. In Guadalupe Mountains National Park, they had constructed the Wallace E. Pratt House, the Ship on the Desert, which resembled an oil tanker.

== Biography ==
Born in Phillipsburg, Kansas, March 15, 1885, Pratt began his career in geology as an assistant with the Kansas Geological Survey shortly after he graduated from the University of Kansas in 1907 with a bachelor's degree.

=== Humble Oil ===
From 1909 to 1914, he worked in Philippines, becoming chief of the Division of Mines there in 1912. He returned to the U.S. in 1916, and in 1918 joined Humble Oil & Refining Co. as the company's first geologist. Prior to that time the company had treated the search for oil as largely a hit or miss operation without scientific exploration. But Pratt, joined by 10 more geologists during 1918–19, proved that geology was an important factor in finding oil. Among the most notable early contributions made by Pratt and his staff were geological studies that led to the correct interpretation of the structure of the huge Mexia Field, discovered in October 1920 in East Texas. On the basis of these studies, Humble bought leases on the structure and developed substantial reserves and production. This work and leasing of large amounts of land that proved productive in Powell, Texas, in 1923 firmly established Humble as an oil producer.

By 1920, the exploitation of Goose Creek Oil Field by Humble Oil led to the subsidence of the land over the oil field. Pratt was tasked with the investigation of this novel phenomenon and produced a report in which the subsidence was definitively attributed to the extraction of petroleum. In 1926, together with D. W. Johnson, he published these findings in a scientific paper. By this year, after about ten years of active pumping, most of the productive area of the field had subsided three feet, and the submerging of the facilities had already become obvious to field operators.

Pratt also played a prominent role in the scientific progress of his profession. As early as 1922, others were using geophysical instruments experimentally on the Texas Gulf Coast as a new method for finding salt domes. After studying results from this work, Pratt concluded that Humble should use geophysical instruments and methods. In line with these recommendations, in 1924, Humble set up a geophysics group and established a shop in Houston for geophysics research and development, and the manufacture of a refraction seismograph recording in the field. Pratt served as Humble's chief geologist and later director, and vice president. In 1937, he joined Standard Oil Co. (Humble's parent firm in New Jersey), once again rising to director, executive committee member, and finally, vice president, a position he held until he retired from the company in 1945. In the same year that he had joined Standard Oil, the company named one of their tankers after him, the SS Wallace E Pratt.

=== Petroleum geologist ===
After retirement, Pratt served on the National Security Resources Board for two years and began a long career as a consultant geologist. Pratt wrote more than 100 geological papers during his lifetime, including Oil in the Earth, one of the most widely read books in his profession. An often repeated quote from this book is, "Gold is where you find it, according to an old adage, but judging from the record of our experience, oil must be sought first of all in our minds." There was a limited amount to find, though: at the University of Kansas, Pratt gave a lecture "Oil in the Earth", where he speculated that the total amount of oil in the United States was 100 billion barrels.

Publications
Title	Year	Author(s)
Distribution of Petroleum in the Earth's Crust	1944	Wallace Pratt
The Earth's Petroleum Resources	1944	Wallace E. Pratt
Toward a Philosophy of Oil-Finding	1952	Wallace E. Pratt

=== Legacy and honors ===
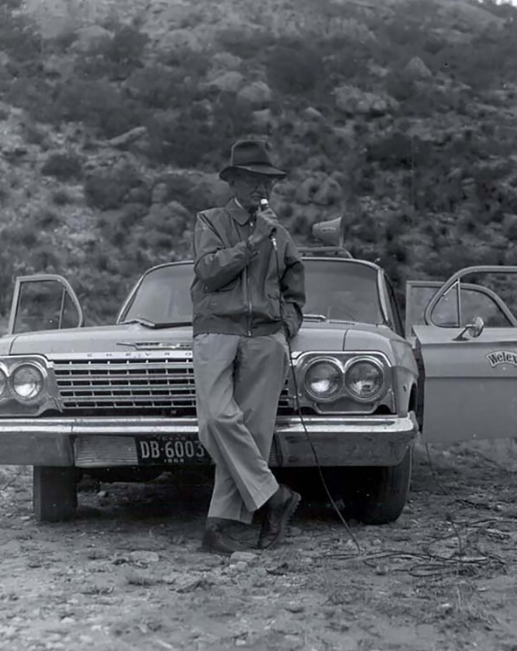
Pratt speaking at the Roswell Geological Society field trip in 1964.

- One of the founders of the American Association of Petroleum Geologists, Pratt was elected fourth president of the association in 1920.
- He was the first recipient of the AAPG's Sidney Powers Memorial Award, awarded in 1945.
- In 1972, he received the AAPG's Human Needs Award.
- He also received the American Institute of Mining and Metallurgical Engineers' Anthony F. Lucas Medal in 1948.
- The American Petroleum Institute's Gold Medal for Distinguished Achievement in 1954. He was director of API for many years.
- Pratt was inducted into the Permian Basin Petroleum Museum's Hall of Fame in 1969.
- He was named Grand Old Man of Exploration in 1976 by directors of the International Petroleum Exposition.
- Since 1982, the AAPG has given the Wallace E. Pratt Memorial Award to the best AAPG Bulletin article published each calendar year.

=== Guadalupe Mountains National Park ===
Wallace E. Pratt donated 5,632 acres (22.79 km^{2}), which included McKittrick Canyon, to the National Park Service, forming the core of the Guadalupe Mountains National Park. This land includes his former homes:

- Pratt Cabin, open to the public.
- Ship On The Desert, a home built to resemble an oil tanker, now used as a ranger station.
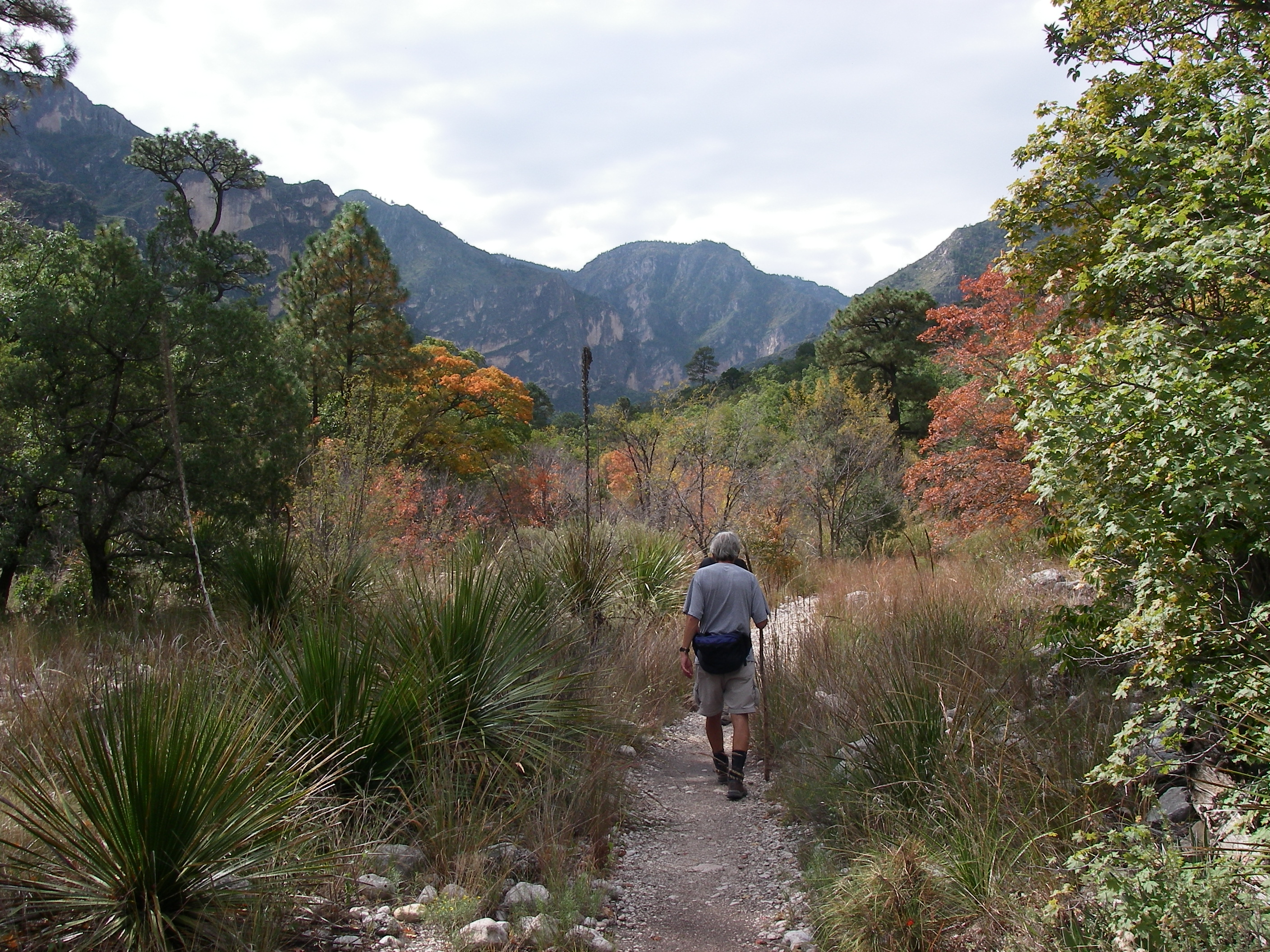
McKittrick Canyon Trail

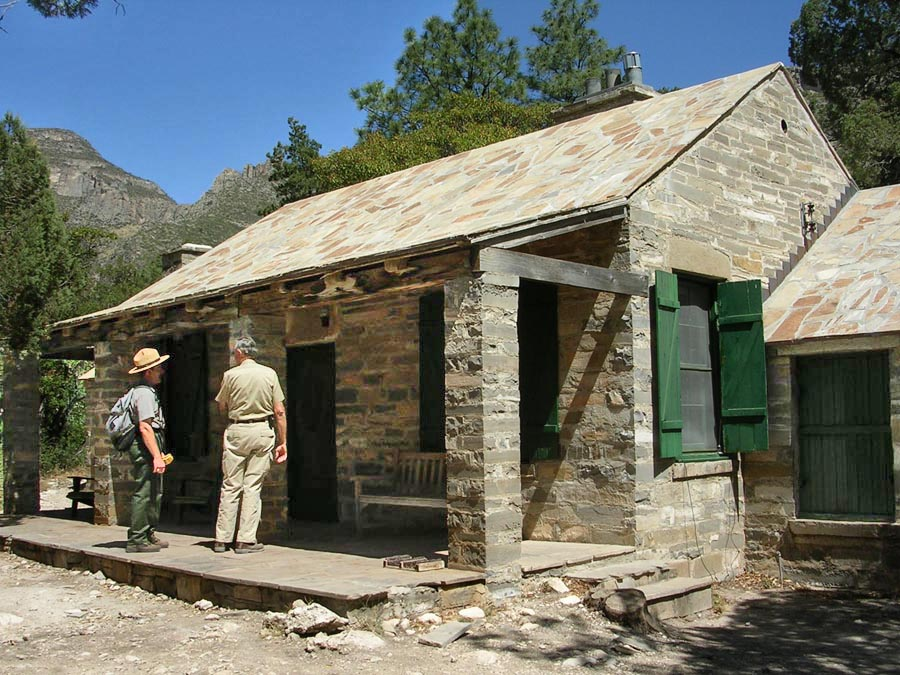
Wallace Pratt Lodge in McKittrick Canyon

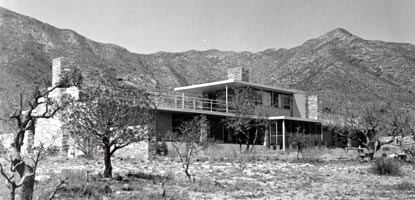
Ship on the Desert. The Wallace Pratt home with landscape.

Pratt died December 25, 1981, in his Tucson, Arizona, home. He was 96.
