= Iris Calderhead =

American suffragist (1889–1966)

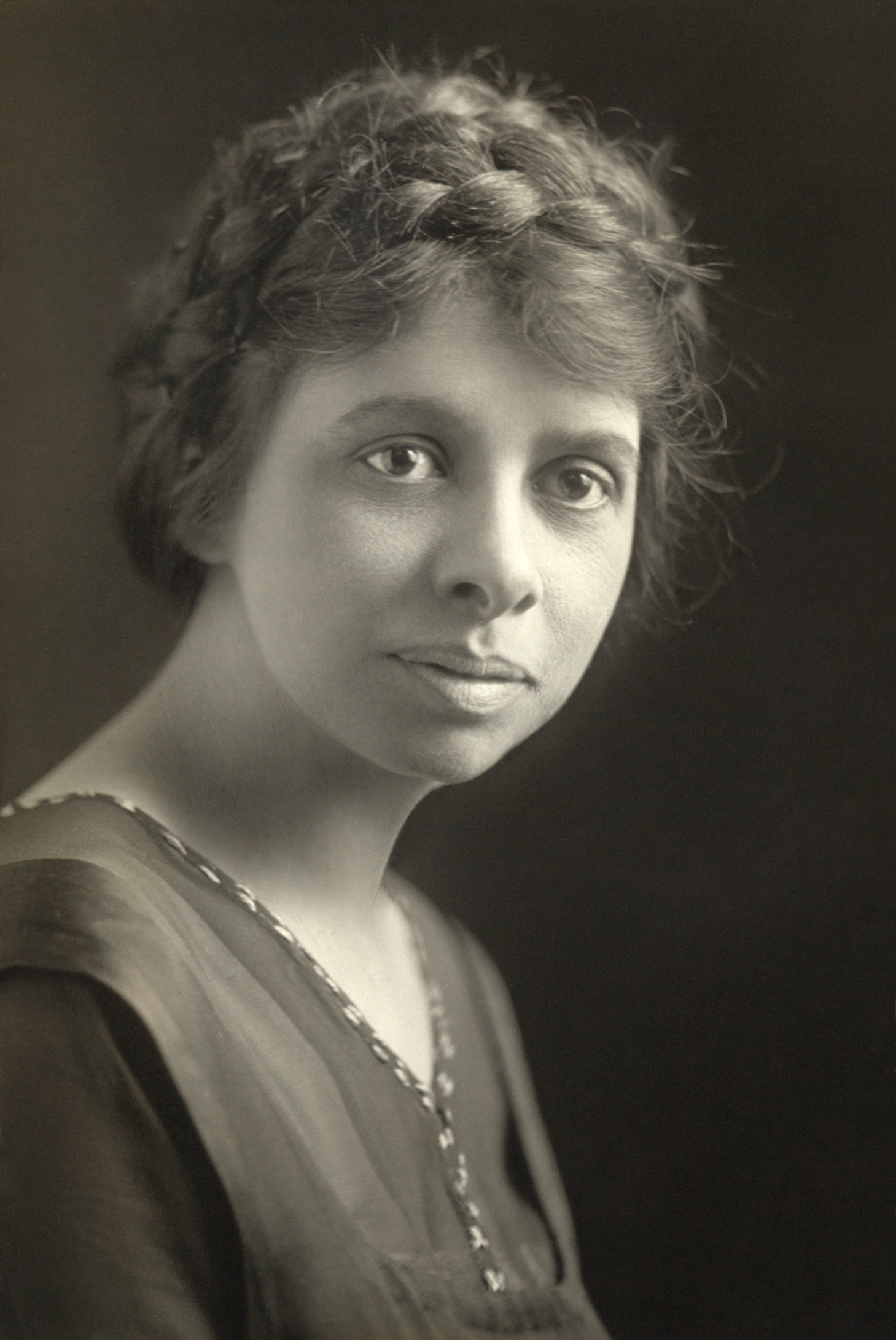
- Portrait photograph, c. 1917
- Born: January 3, 1889; Marysville, Kansas, U.S.
- Died: March 6, 1966 (aged 77); Tucson, Arizona, U.S.
- Other name: Iris Calderhead Pratt
- Education: Bryn Mawr College, University of Kansas
- Occupation: Suffragist
- Spouses: John Brisben Walker (m. 1918; died 1931) Wallace Pratt (m. 1941)

Iris Calderhead (January 3, 1889 – March 6, 1966) was an American suffragist and organizer in the National Woman's Party. She earned an A.B. in English from the University of Kansas in 1910 and completed a graduate degree at Bryn Mawr College in 1913. She was the daughter of William A. Calderhead, the congressional representative for Kansas' 5th District from 1895 to 1911.

== Education and academic work ==
Calderhead attended the University of Kansas from 1906 to 1910, graduating with an A.B. in English. During her time at the university, she was a member of Pi Beta Phi, a fraternity dedicated to the educational advancement of women. In 1910, she published an article in the journal Modern Language Notes and began graduate studies at Bryn Mawr, having won a fellowship there.

From 1910 to 1911, she was a Graduate Scholar in English, and from 1912 to 1913 was a resident fellow in English. She spent the summer of 1913 at the University of Chicago and returned to Marysville to teach English and science. In 1916, her work on Middle English appeared in Modern Philology, publishing for the first time several fragments of early morality plays.

== Activism ==
Calderhead became involved in the women's suffrage movement after meeting Doris Stevens and Lucy Burns, leaders of the Congressional Union, in New York City. Her first assignment in 1915 was to help organize the Union's exhibit at the Panama–Pacific International Exposition and the Women's Voter Convention. Calderhead was willing to travel extensively to advocate for suffrage. "I came a long way to work for the union because national suffrage seems to me the biggest political issue before the country," she explained. "I think I ought to be able to convince others of this."

In 1916 Calderhead, in her role as secretary of the Congressional Union of Kansas, sent a letter to the House Committee on the Judiciary, informing them that on March 15, the fourth Kansas district Republican Convention had adopted a resolution favoring women's suffrage. In August that same year, the NWP dispatched teams to states that had already granted suffrage to mobilize support for a federal amendment for women's suffrage. Calderhead was sent to Arizona, which had granted women the right to vote in 1912, along with Vivian Pierce, Ella Thompson, Helen Todd, and Rose Winslow. The group met resistance from the Democratic Party, which opposed women's suffrage, and Calderhead reported that members of the party tried to ban the suffragists' meetings. She also traveled to Oklahoma to recruit supporters, telling a reporter for the Tulsa World that "We women of the [enfranchised] West must try to put ourselves in the places of the women of the great industrial centers of the East. These are the women for whom we are making this fight for freedom. It is literally that – a fight for liberation."

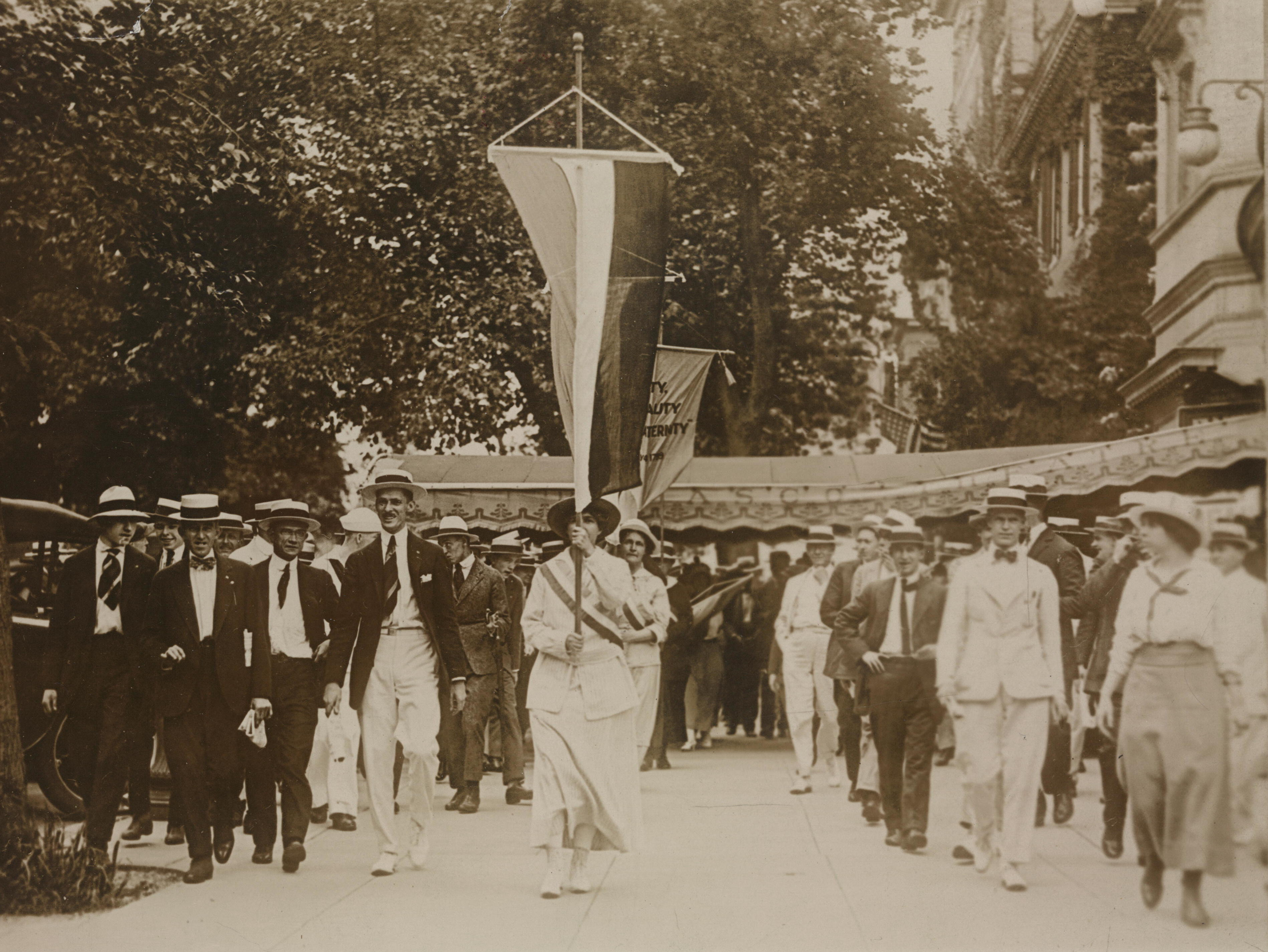
Iris Calderhead (far right) and other suffragists in a march in Washington, D.C., on July 14, 1917

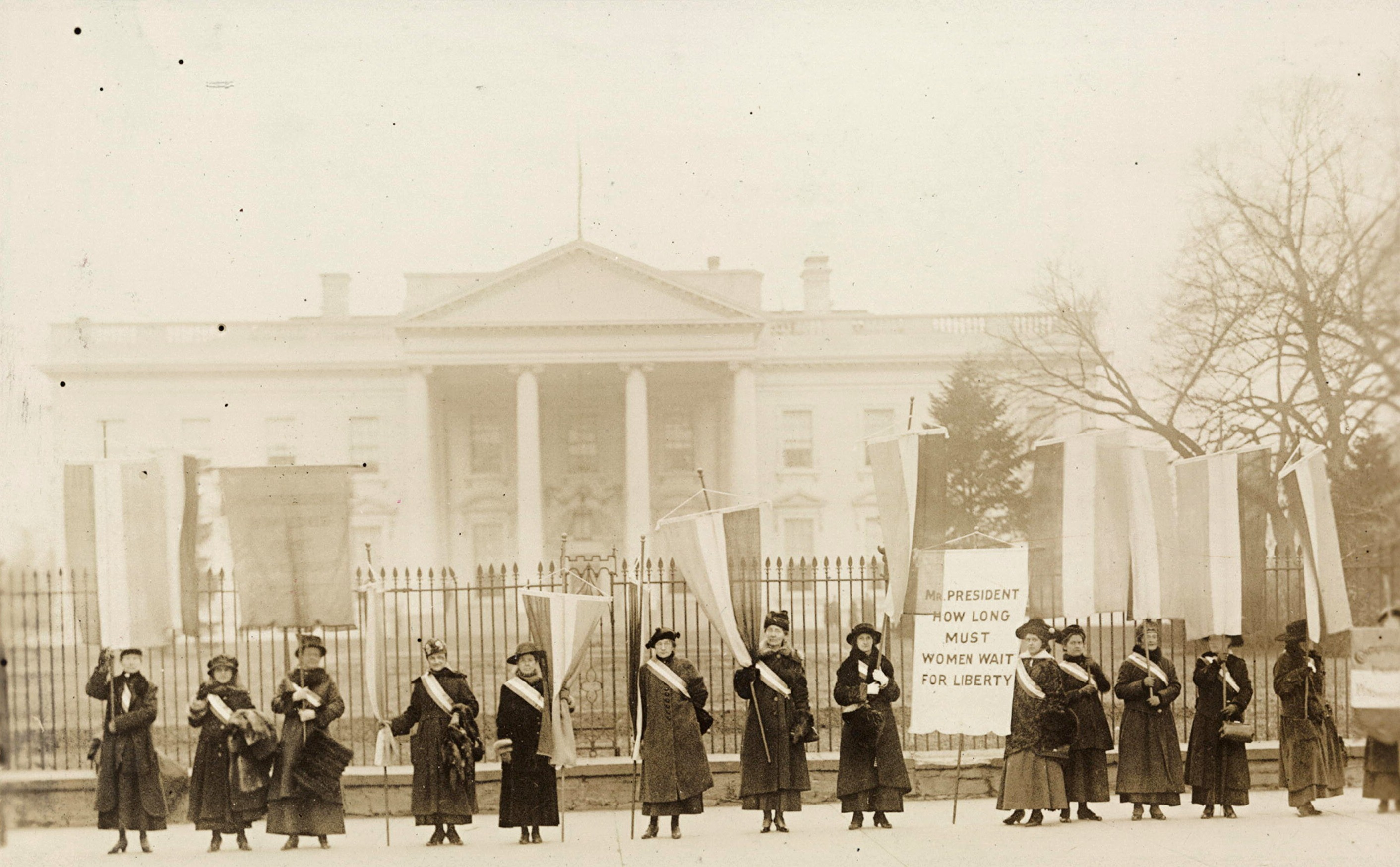
National Women's Party members picketing the White House in 1917

In June 1917, Calderhead was arrested at the Smithsonian Institution, where she and fellow organizer Elizabeth Stuyvesant planned to display a banner during a visit by President Woodrow Wilson. On July 14, 1917, Calderhead was arrested again for picketing the White House during the Silent Sentinels demonstrations and served three days in the Occoquan Workhouse.

From January to June 1918, Calderhead conducted a speaking tour through Colorado, Massachusetts, Ohio, and Pennsylvania; she was sent on the tour by Alice Paull to promote the National American Woman Suffrage Association.

The Nineteenth Amendment to the United States Constitution guaranteed women's right to vote in the United States in 1919, but Calderhead's activism did not stop then. Neither did her marriage in 1918 (even though it was uncommon at the time for women to remain politically active after marrying.) By the 1930s, she was working out of what is now Belmont–Paul Women's Equality National Monument as the Director of the National Woman’s Party campaign to force the newly created World Court to protect the rights of women around the world. In 1932, she spoke on the issue before the United States House Committee on Foreign Affairs. During the Great Depression, she was an official at the Consumers' Counsel Division of the Agricultural Adjustment Administration and authored the 1936 report "Consumer Services of Government Agencies".

== Personal life ==
Iris Calderhead was born January 3, 1889, in Marysville, Kansas, to Alice Gallant Calderhead and William A. Calderhead, a Civil War veteran and a multi-term U.S. Representative; before his political career, he was a teacher, a lawyer, and served as the prosecuting attorney of Marshall County.

While in Colorado during her 1918 speaking tour, the 25-year-old Calderhead met and married the 71-year-old local "Renaissance man," John Brisben Walker, and moved to his residence in Morrison, Colorado. (She married Walker despite widespread criticisms of suffragists getting married.) In 1919, newspapers reported that Calderhead and her husband were launching a socialist newspaper. She was at Walker's side when he died in 1931.

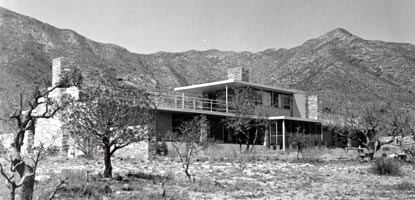
Ship on the Desert, home of Wallace Pratt and Iris Calderhead Pratt in McKittrick Canyon

In 1941, she married her college classmate, Wallace Pratt, a petroleum geologist who by that time had become vice-president of Standard Oil. The two moved to Pratt's home in McKittrick Canyon in far West Texas and built a new house there. The house was designed to look like an oil tanker at sea (a tribute to Pratt's long career in the oil industry), with the entrance door painted a bold purple, the color of the women's suffrage movement and National Woman's Party. The Pratts moved to Arizona in 1963, so that Calderhead could receive treatment for arthritis.

Calderhead died March 6, 1966, in Tucson, Arizona. In accordance with her wishes, she was cremated, and her ashes were scattered by her husband in McKittrick Canyon, a place she loved.

Even though she was married to a highly prominent oil executive and had been out of the public eye for decades, the New York Times chose to lead her obituary with describing her legacy and not her husband's:

"Mrs. Iris Calderhead Pratt, once jailed briefly for picketing the White House as a suffragette when Woodrow Wilson was President, died yesterday."

== See also ==
- List of suffragists and suffragettes
