= Frijole Ranch =

- Guadalupe Ranch
- U.S. National Register of Historic Places
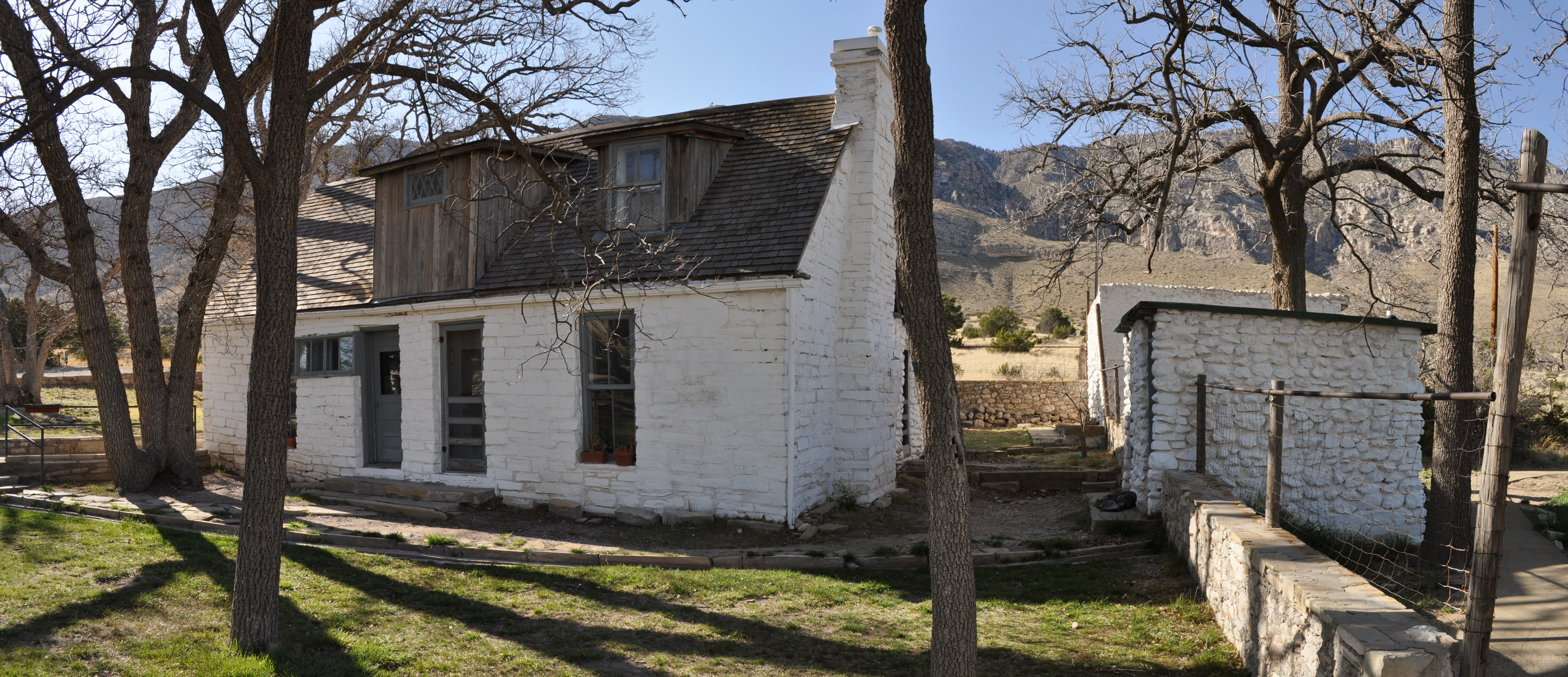
- Guadalupe Ranch house

- Location within Texas Location within the United States
- Nearest city: Salt Flat, Texas
- Coordinates: 31°54′27″N 104°48′0″W
- Area: 9 acres (3.6 ha)
- Built: 1876
- NRHP reference No.: 78000259
- Added to NRHP: November 21, 1978

The Frijole Ranch, also known as Guadalupe Ranch, Spring Hill Ranch and the Rader-Smith Ranch, is located in Guadalupe Mountains National Park in extreme west Texas. It was listed on the National Register of Historic Places on November 21, 1978, and represents a significant period in the settlement and ranching of the Guadalupe Mountains.

== History ==
The ranch was built about 1876 by the Rader Brothers in the Guadalupe Mountains next to Frijole Spring and comprises seven buildings: the ranch house, a bunkhouse, a barn, a double outhouse, a springhouse, a shed, and a school house. With the exception of the barn and school house, the buildings are constructed of local stone rubble, and all buildings are surrounded by a stone rubble wall. The complex represents the most complete early ranching operation in the Guadalupe Mountains. The ranch was built in close proximity to several other springs, whose surrounding area was inhabited by Native Americans from prehistory.

The Rader brothers, the first settlers on the southeast side of the mountains, left the area in the late 1880s. The Herring family of North Carolina occupied the ranch for a time between the late 1880s and 1895, with Herring daughter Ida marrying George W. Wolcott in 1888. The Wolcotts moved to Midland, Texas in 1895. The Smith family occupied the previously vacant ranch from 1906, calling it "Spring Hill Ranch." The Smiths expanded the ranch and operated a truck farm, expanding the farm house and building the bunkhouse and school house. They invested in a hydraulic ram to pump water and installed a carbide lamp system in the house, later changing to electric lights operated by a wind generator. The Smiths operated a post office at the site from 1916 to 1942.

John Smith sold the ranch to Judge Jesse Coleman Hunter of Van Horn, Texas for $55,000 in 1942 and moved to Hawley, Texas. Hunter assembled the "Guadalupe Mountains Ranch" of 43,000 acres (17,000 ha), producing, among other things, mohair wool. The ranch house was the home of ranch foreman Noel Kincaid from 1942 to 1969. Hunter began to advocate the region for a national park in 1925. Hunter's son, J.C. Junior, inherited the ranch in 1945 and continued his father's work, expanding the ranch to 67,213 acres (27,200 ha), eventually selling the land to the National Park Service in 1966 for $1.5 million.

== National Park ==
The ranch buildings were used by the National Park Service as employee residence and utility buildings from 1969 to 1980. From 1983 to 1991 the house was a Park Service operations center. The house was restored in 1992 and is an interpretive center and museum, known as the Frijole Ranch Cultural Museum.

== See also ==
- National Register of Historic Places listings in Culberson County, Texas
