= Delaware Mountains =

Mountain range in Texas, United States

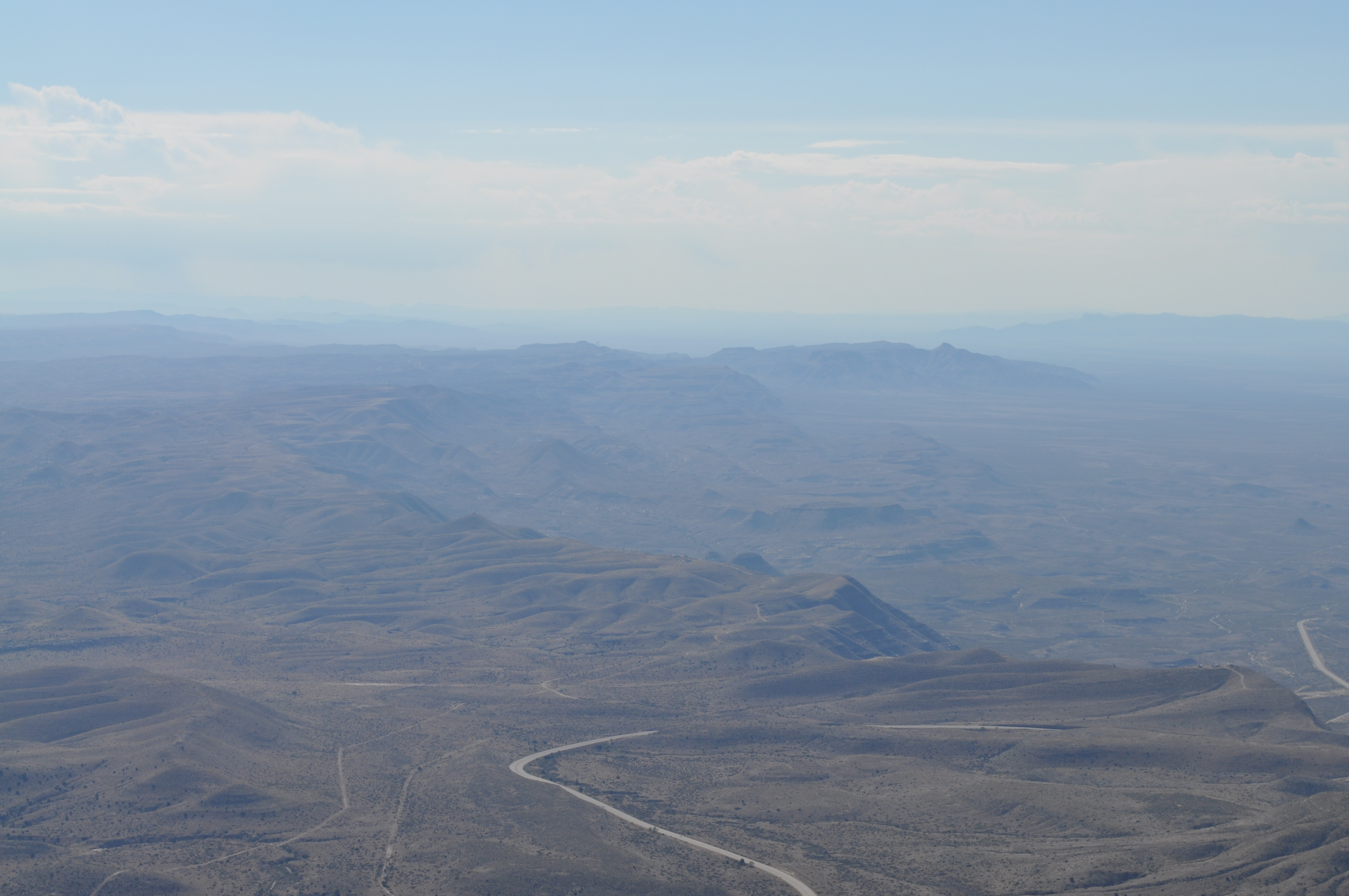

Highest point
- Peak: Delaware Benchmark
- Elevation: 5,888 ft (1,795 m)
- Coordinates: 31°29′10″N 104°37′28″W

Dimensions
- Length: 83 mi (134 km) N/S
- Width: 106 mi (171 km) E/W
- Area: 4,761 mi^{2} (12,330 km^{2})

Geography
- Country: United States
- State: Texas

The Delaware Mountains are a mountain range in the U.S. state of Texas, spanning part of Culberson County. The highest point in the range is the Delaware Benchmark at an elevation of 5,888 feet (1,795 m) above sea level. The range extends south-southeast from Guadalupe Pass at the southern extent of the Guadalupe Mountains and Guadalupe Mountains National Park. The range is formed by horizontal layers of limestone, sandstone, and shale that were deposited 250 million years ago during the Permian that now encompass the Delaware Mountain Formation. The range is named for the Lenape, who are also known as the Delaware Indians. The Delaware Mountain Wind Energy Center is a 28.5 megawatt wind farm that was constructed on the northern portion of the range in 1999 and is operated by NextEra Energy Resources.

== See also ==
- Beach Mountains
- Delaware Basin
- Delaware River
- El Capitan (Texas)
- Guadalupe Peak
- McKittrick Canyon
- Trans-Pecos
- Van Horn, Texas
