= Wallace E. Pratt House =

Historic house in Texas, United States

- U.S. National Register of Historic Places
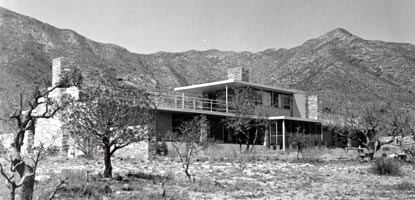
- Wallace E. Pratt House

- Location within Texas Location within the United States
- Location: Pratt Dr. at McKittrick Rd., Guadalupe Mountains National Park
- Nearest city: Salt Flat, Texas
- Coordinates: 31°57′29.2″N 104°45′32.4″W
- Area: 20 acres (8.1 ha)
- Built: 1941–1943
- Built by: Edward Birdsall
- Architect: Elizabeth Hopkins Bevin and Newton P. Bevin, Milliken & Bevin
- Architectural style: International Style
- NRHP reference No.: 11000927
- Added to NRHP: December 15, 2011

The Wallace E. Pratt House, also known as Ship on the Desert (sometimes hyphenated), was the residence of Wallace Pratt in what is now Guadalupe Mountains National Park in far western Texas. Pratt, a petroleum geologist for the Humble Oil & Refining Company, had previously built the Wallace Pratt Lodge in McKittrick Canyon a couple of miles to the north in the Guadalupe Mountains. Finding the cabin site to be remote and prone to being cut off by flooding, Pratt and his second wife, prominent former suffragist Iris Calderhead Pratt, started construction of a new, modern residence on the east slope of the mountains. Work on the residence started in 1941. The house was designed by Long Island architect Newton Bevin, who lived for a time at the site with his wife, and built by contractor Ed Birdsall. Work was stopped by World War II, but resumed in 1945 and was completed the same year.

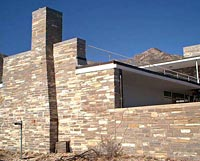
Exterior walls captured in a National Park Service photograph

In contrast to Pratt's rustic canyon cabin, the house, which the Pratts named the Ship On The Desert, is an International Style house with horizontal lines and extensive glazing. Only 16 feet (4.9 m) wide and 110 feet (34 m) long, the house provides broad views to the east over the plains and the west to the mountains. The majority of the house is on a single level, with a "captain's bridge" over the dining room giving access to a rooftop terrace. A detached garage contained a guest bedroom. Apart from glass, the predominant material was local limestone in several shades. The house was designed to look like an oil tanker at sea (a tribute to Pratt's long career in the oil industry), with the entrance door painted a bold purple, the color of the women's suffrage movement, of which Iris had been a prominent participant in her youth.

Pratt and Iris lived at the Ship On The Desert until 1963, when Iris's health dictated a move to Tucson, Arizona. The house was donated to the new park along with 5,632 acres (2,279 ha) of lands in the northern part of the proposed park by the Pratts between 1959 and 1961. It was used as a residence for National Park Service employees. The house is occasionally open for tours sponsored by the National Park Service.

The house was featured on the National Trust for Historic Preservation's 2018 list of most-endangered historic locations. It was listed on the National Register of Historic Places on December 15, 2011.

== See also ==
- National Register of Historic Places listings in Culberson County, Texas
- National Register of Historic Places listings in Guadalupe Mountains National Park
