= Newton P. Bevin =

American architect

Newton Philo Bevin (October 4, 1895 – October 9, 1976), sometimes referred to as Newton Philo Bevin II, was an American architect, specializing in residential design.

== Early life and education ==
Bevin was the son of Samuel Mills Bevin and Julia Huntington Williams Bevin. He prepared at Poly Prep in Brooklyn, and graduated from Princeton University in 1917, and served in World War I. He received his architecture degree from the University of Pennsylvania in 1922.

== Career ==
From 1927 to 1944, with Henry O. Milliken, he formed the firm Milliken & Bevin, and from 1944 to his death, he practiced as his own firm.

The Milliken-Bevin Trellis (1931) is included in a National Register listing for Roslyn Harbor, New York.

In 1938, Helen Clay Frick Selected Milliken & Bevin to make alterations to Eagle Rock, a Frick family summer residence in Prides Crossing, Massachusetts.

Milliken & Bevin designed the gymnasium at the Iron Rail Vacation Home in Wenham, MA in 1939. This structure was built by contractor Stephen D. Edwards and dedicated in 1941. The property was developed by Helen Clay Frick, daughter of Henry Clay Frick.

With his wife, Elizabeth Hopkins Bevin, he designed and supervised construction of the Wallace E. Pratt House in the Guadalupe Mountains National Park in Texas.

Bevin designed alterations for housekeeping apartments at 9 E. 68th Street for Susan Dwight Bliss in 1944-46.

He designed a Connecticut country home addition for Evelyn and Henry C. Spencer in 1954.

He was involved in the restoration of Washington Depot part of Washington, Connecticut after 1955 Connecticut Floods. He was awarded the Ward Melville Certificate for Community Improvement in 1960.

In 1961, Bevin was the architect for the new Our Lady of Fatima Church in Bridgeport, Connecticut.

In 1964, Bevin wrote prepared the Historic Structures Report Part II for Hamilton Grange.

In 1965, Bevin conducted a study of Grant's Tomb for the National Park Service and his recommendations for alterations were included in later reports.

== Personal life ==
Bevin retired and lived with his wife Elizabeth Hopkins Bevin at their house on Judd Road in Southbury, Connecticut. He died in 1976, aged 81.
