= Billingsley-Hills House =

Historic house in Iowa, United States

- U.S. National Register of Historic Places
- U.S. Historic district – Contributing property
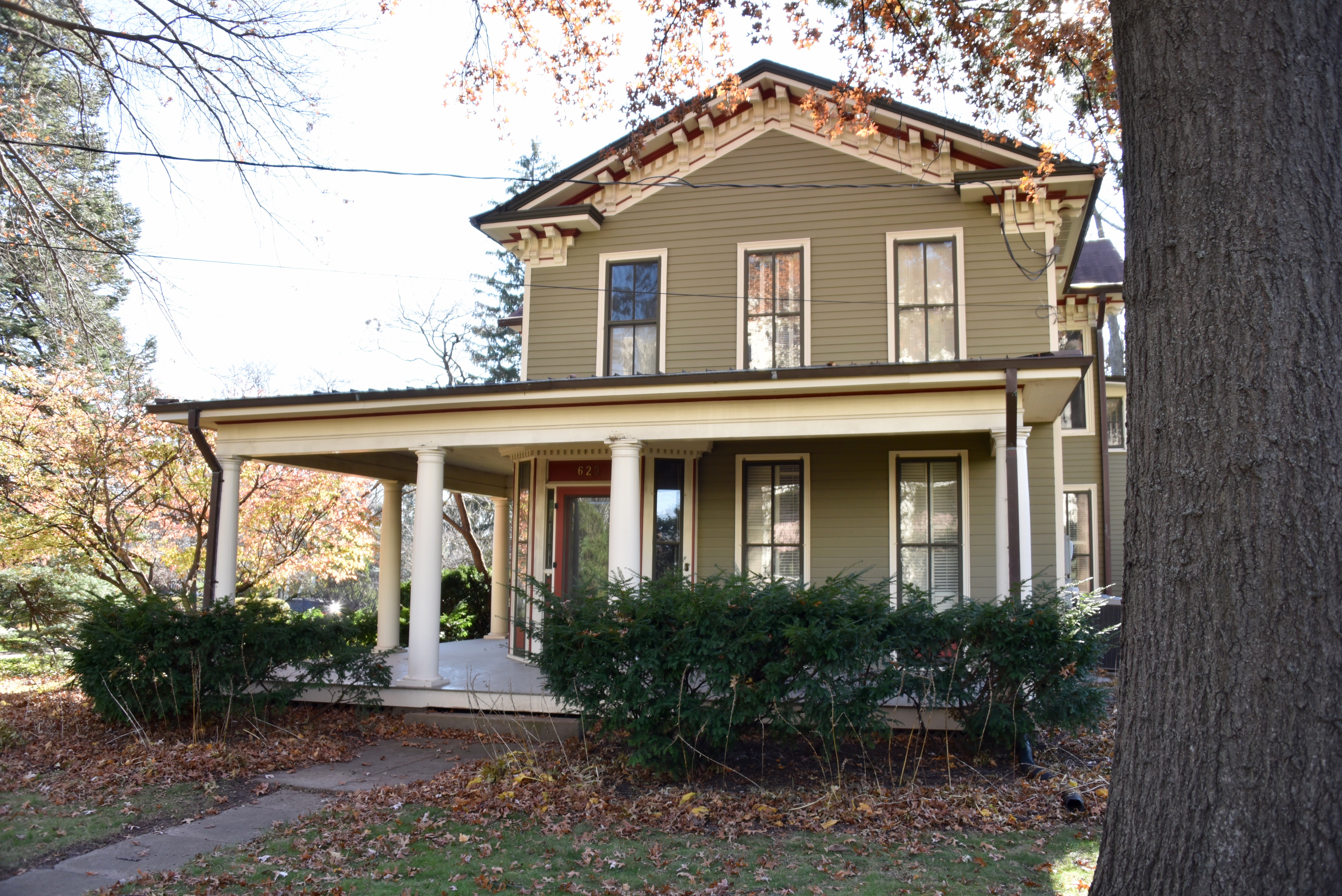

- Location within Iowa Location within the United States
- Location: 629 Melrose Ave. Iowa City, Iowa
- Coordinates: 41°39′23.5″N 91°32′53.7″W
- Area: less than one acre
- Built: 1870
- Architectural style: Late Victorian
- Part of: Melrose Historic District (ID04001321)
- NRHP reference No.: 83000376
- Added to NRHP: January 21, 1983

The Billingsley-Hills House, also known as the Veatch Residence, is a historic building located in Iowa City, Iowa, United States. This is one of several transitional Greek Revival to Italianate houses built in this area in the years before and after the American Civil War making it a very popular style here. Over the years, however, most of them have either been torn down or altered beyond recognition leaving this house as one of few left with its integrity intact. When this house was built in 1870 it was situated on a 38-acre (15 ha) estate, but by the turn of the 20th century the lot was reduced to its present size. Situated in a residential area with the University of Iowa Hospitals and Clinics across the street, the two-story frame house features a low pitched gable roof, bracketed eaves, an entablature with dentils and returns, and a wrap-around front porch.

The house was individually listed on the National Register of Historic Places on January 21, 1983. In 2004 it was included as a contributing property in the Melrose Historic District.
