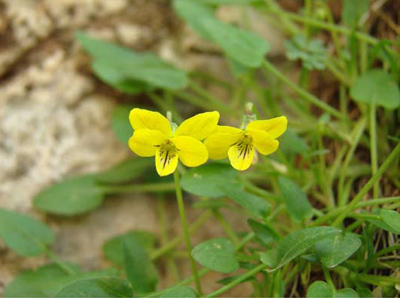

Scientific classification
- Kingdom: Plantae
- Clade: Tracheophytes
- Clade: Angiosperms
- Clade: Eudicots
- Clade: Rosids
- Order: Malpighiales
- Family: Violaceae
- Genus: Viola
- Species: V. guadalupensis

Binomial name
- Viola guadalupensis A.M.Powell & Wauer

= Viola guadalupensis =

Species of plant

Viola guadalupensis, the Guadalupe Mountains violet, is a perennial yellow-flowered violet, and is an extremely rare endemic plant of the Guadalupe Mountains. The violet is known only from Guadalupe Mountains National Park, where it grows at high elevations on vertical limestone faces.

The Guadalupe Mountains violet was first described in 1990 when it was found at one location along the East Rim of Frijole Ridge. A second, isolated population was found in 2006 in a steep, slot-canyon drainage about 2 km from the first colony, and two additional populations of the violet were found in the park in 2009. The Guadalupe Mountains violet is currently considered a National Park Service Species of Concern. The species is thought to have highly specific habitat requirements. It is the only yellow-flowered violet in the region.

== Status and trends ==
At the plant’s type locality (the location where the plant was first found and described), the Guadalupe Mountains violet grows in mats of up to 20 individuals that are rooted in small openings of the rock face. The dolomitized, limestone rock on which the plants occur is northwest-facing and at approximately 2,600 m elevation. Two large Douglas firs (Pseudotsuga menziesii) shade the plants, which grow in association with species including rock spiraea (Petrophytum caespitosum), Guadalupe valerian (Valeriana texana), small rocklettuce (Pinaropappus parvus), and Guadalupe leastdaisy (Chaetopappa hersheyi). Inventories at the type locality were conducted in 2001, 2002, 2004, and 2006. In 2001, the colony had 75 plants (clustered within an area 2.5 m by 3 m in size); the colony had grown to about 95 plants in 2006. The second population contained about 25 individuals in 2006, which grew mainly as individual plants rather than in mats. The populations discovered in 2009 contained about 100 and 500 individual plants in that year.

Baseline data recorded at the plant's type locality include temperature, relative humidity, and daytime light intensity during the growing season, but as of 2008, no intensive investigations have been conducted due to concerns for damaging the population. Microclimate and substrate type may be critical for this species, but this is not yet confirmed.

A geographical information system (GIS)-based habitat model, generated from the elevation, aspect, and slope at the type locality, was developed in 2006 and produced a map that predicted suitable habitat for the violet throughout the park. The model produced 14 locations, nine of which were ground-truthed. Of the nine sites, one was the type locality, one led to the discovery of a new population of the plant (i.e., the population containing about 25 plants), three were determined to be suitable for introduction of the plant, and four were considered unsuitable for introduction. Overall, the model had 56% accuracy for predicting suitable or existing habitat.

== Conservation ==
Concern exists for the Guadalupe Mountains violet due to the lack of significant information on its habitat requirements. The plant is thought to be threatened by genetic isolation and to be susceptible to catastrophic fire, disease, and herbivory. To preserve the viability of the species, the park began efforts to introduce laboratory-germinated plants or seeds to suitable locations within the park. To date, park personnel collected seeds from the field and NPS cooperators produced plants from the seeds. Once appropriate transplant techniques are determined, seeds or plants will be transplanted in suitable sites and their success monitored. Also, continued monitoring of existing violet sites will lead to better understanding the plant’s specific requirements and needs for its management.
