= Wallace Pratt Lodge =

Historic house in Texas, United States

- U.S. National Register of Historic Places
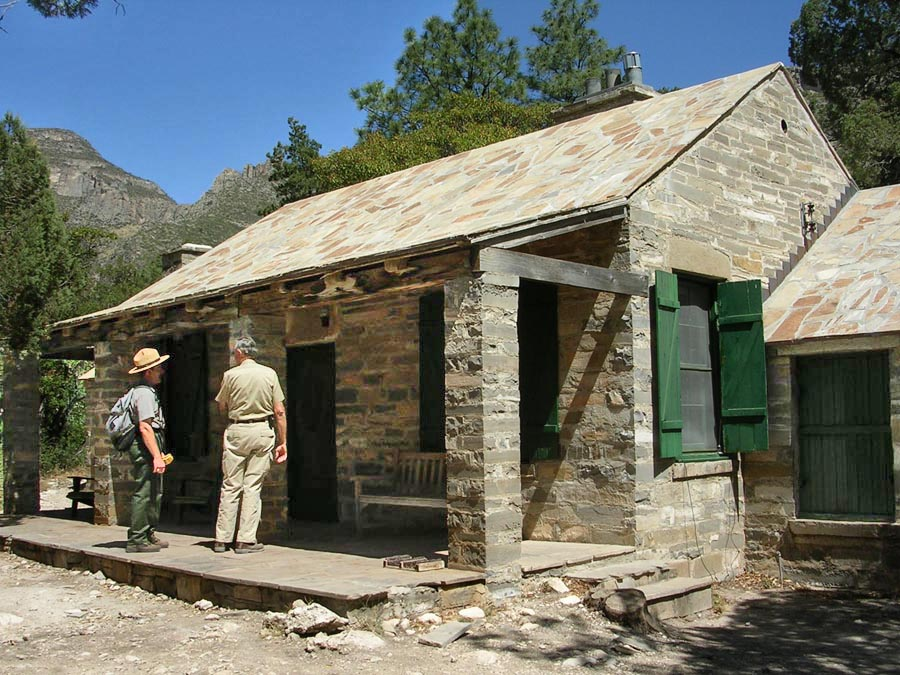
- Wallace Pratt Lodge

- Location within Texas Location within the United States
- Location: At jct. of N and S branch of McKittrick Canyon, Guadalupe Mountains National Park, Texas
- Coordinates: 31°59′1″N 104°46′50″W
- Area: 4 acres (1.6 ha)
- Built: 1930
- NRHP reference No.: 75000154
- Added to NRHP: March 26, 1975

The Wallace Pratt Lodge was the summer residence of Wallace Pratt, the principal donor of the lands that would become Guadalupe Mountains National Park. Pratt was a petroleum geologist employed by the Humble Oil Company, scouting for oilfield leases in west Texas. Pratt visited the Guadalupe Mountains in 1921, and taking a liking to the place, he bought a quarter share of the McCombs Ranch. In 1929 Pratt bought out his partners, ending up owning a large portion of the canyon, which featured waterfalls flowing over travertine dams, a lush, quiet place in the high desert.

In the winter of 1931-1932 Pratt started construction of a house in the canyon, designed by noted Houston architect John F. Staub, who also designed the Pratt's Houston residence. In charge of construction was Vance Phenix, Staub's former employee and residential architect. Vance's brother Dean, a carpenter, and stonemason Adolph May were key craftsmen on the project. The cabin was built of local limestone and heart pine.

The Pratt family spent summers at the cabin, which they called the Stone Cabin, and briefly lived there during Wallace Pratt's early retirement. An earlier experience being trapped at the Stone Cabin during a flood caused Pratt to reconsider its use as a full-time residence, so a second home, the Ship On The Desert, was constructed outside of the canyon. At some time during construction, probably in 1945, The Stone Cabin was used as a residence by the Ship On the Desert's New York architect, Newton Bevin, and his wife Elizabeth.

After moving to Tucson, Arizona, Pratt donated the Stone Cabin, the Ship On the Desert, and surrounding lands of more than 5,000 acres (2,000 ha) to the National Park Service, forming the nucleus of Guadalupe Mountains National Park.

The cabin was listed on the National Register of Historic Places on March 26, 1975.

== See also ==
- McKittrick Canyon
- Guadalupe Mountains National Park
- Ship On The Desert
- National Register of Historic Places listings in Culberson County, Texas
