= Melrose Historic District (Iowa City, Iowa) =

Historic district in Iowa, United States

- U.S. National Register of Historic Places
- U.S. Historic district
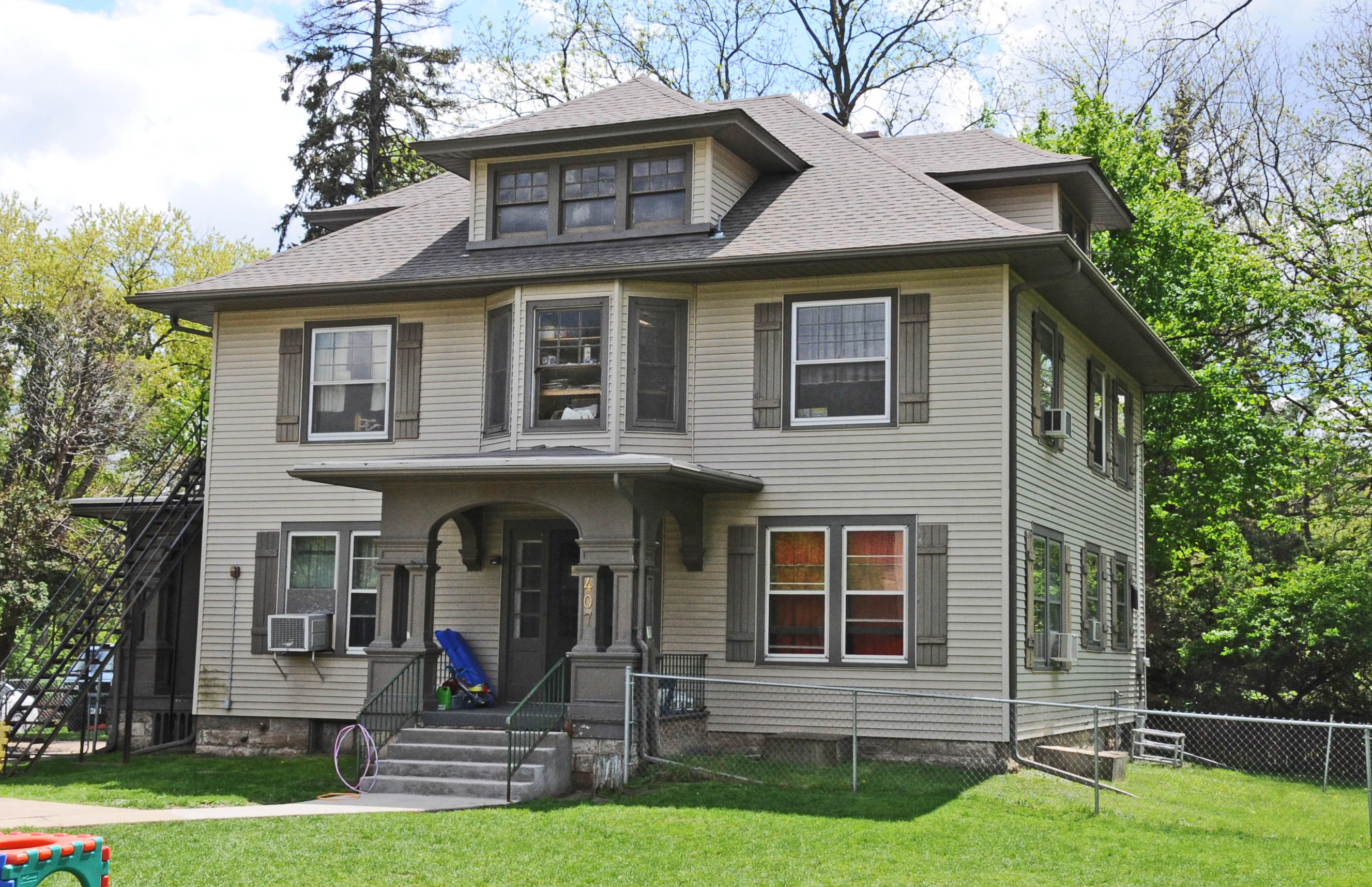

- Location within Iowa Location within the United States
- Location: Portions of Melrose Ave., Melrose Ct., Melrose Circle, Brookland Park Dr., Brookland Place, and Myrtle Ave., Iowa City, Iowa
- Coordinates: 41°39′16″N 91°30′59″W
- Area: 34 acres (14 ha)
- Architect: Frank X. Freyder; B.A. Wickham
- Architectural style: Italianate; Colonial Revival
- MPS: Iowa City MPS
- NRHP reference No.: 04001321
- Added to NRHP: December 6, 2004

The Melrose Historic District is a nationally recognized historic district located in Iowa City, Iowa, United States. It was listed on the National Register of Historic Places in 2004. At the time of its nomination it consisted of 134 resources, which included 112 contributing buildings, one contributing site, 20 non-contributing buildings, and one non-contributing structure. This neighborhood first developed as a sparsely populated rural area, and between World War I and World War II developed into an automobile suburb. It grew along with the University of Iowa when it expanded to the west side of the Iowa River, and it borders the large University of Iowa Hospitals and Clinics complex. Among the prominent people who lived here was Howard Jones who coached the Iowa football team from 1916 to 1923. Other prominent residents included professors and local professionals and politicians.

The houses in the neighborhood vary in size from large multi-story, ornamented structures to those that are more modest in scale. They also reflect the styles that were popular in the city at the time it was transformed from a largely rural area to a suburban area. The street patterns vary from curvilinear, to cul-de-sac, to grid patterns and a major town and country highway. The district also includes Brookland Park. The Billingsley-Hills House (1870) and the A.W. Pratt House (1885) were individually listed on the National Register of Historic Places.
