= First Presbyterian Church (Van Horn, Texas) =

Historic church in Texas, United States

- U.S. National Register of Historic Places
- Recorded Texas Historic Landmark
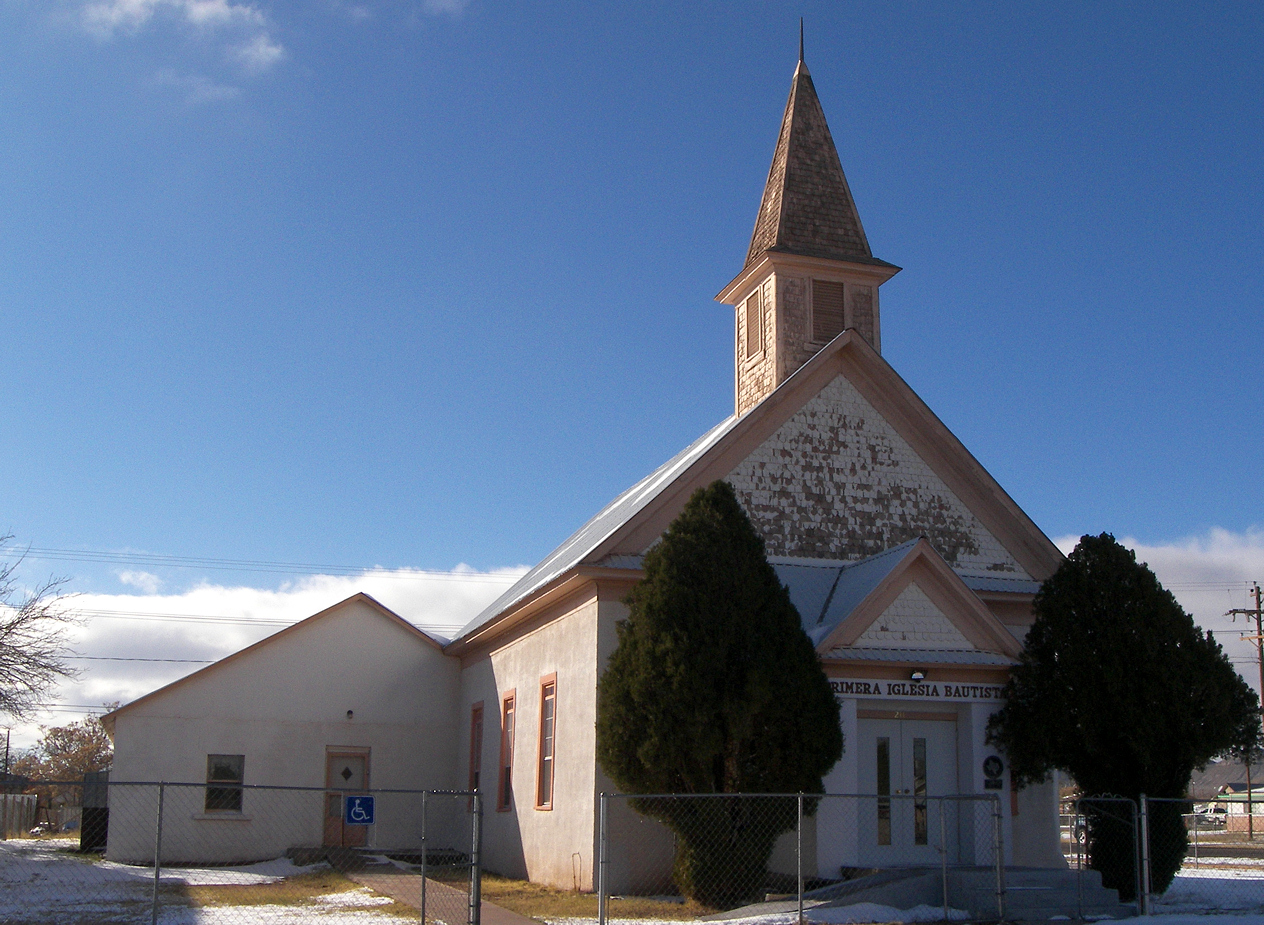
- Church as seen from the northwest

- Location within Texas Location within the United States
- Location: Fannin and 3rd Sts., Van Horn, Texas
- Coordinates: 31°2′33″N 104°50′4″W
- Area: less than one acre
- Built: 1901
- Architectural style: Carpenter Gothic
- NRHP reference No.: 78002912
- RTHL No.: 7928

Significant dates
- Added to NRHP: December 1, 1978
- Designated RTHL: 1964

First Presbyterian Church, now known as Primera Iglesia Bautista (First Baptist Church), is a historic Christian church building on Fannin and 3rd Streets in Van Horn, Texas.

The Carpenter Gothic-style church building was constructed in 1901. It was added to the National Register of Historic Places in 1978. As of 2013, the church is known as Primera Iglesia Bautista (First Baptist Church). The congregation offers Sunday services in Spanish at 11 am and Wednesday evening prayer meetings at 7 pm.

== See also ==
- National Register of Historic Places listings in Culberson County, Texas
