= Delaware Mountain Wind Farm =

Wind farm in Texas, United States

- Country: United States
- Location: near Van Horn, Texas
- Coordinates: 31°44′03″N 104°45′52″W
- Status: Decommissioned
- Commission date: 1999
- Decommission date: August 2014
- Owner: NextEra Energy Resources

Wind farm
- Type: Onshore

Power generation
- Units operational: 38
- Nameplate capacity: 28.5 MW

External links
- Website: https://web.archive.org/web/20110717082348/http://www.infinitepower.org/projects.htm

Delaware Mountain Wind Farm is a wind farm in the Delaware Mountains of Culberson County, Texas. The farm comprises thirty-eight EWC Zond Z-48 750 kilowatt wind turbines that produce up to 28.5 megawatts of electricity. The Lower Colorado River Authority purchases all electricity produced by the project. The project was completed in 1999 by Orion Energy LLC and National Wind Power. NextEra Energy Resources now owns and operates the wind farm. As a result of damage to the wind farm and transmission infrastructure by an ice storm in November 2013, the Delaware Mountain Wind Farm and the adjacent Wind Power Partners 94 wind farm have been offline. NextEra has informed the ERCOT, Electric Reliability Council of Texas, that it is dismantling the farms and "... they will be decommissioned and retired on 7 August 2014."
