= A. W. Pratt House =

Historic house in Iowa, United States

- U.S. National Register of Historic Places
- U.S. Historic district – Contributing property
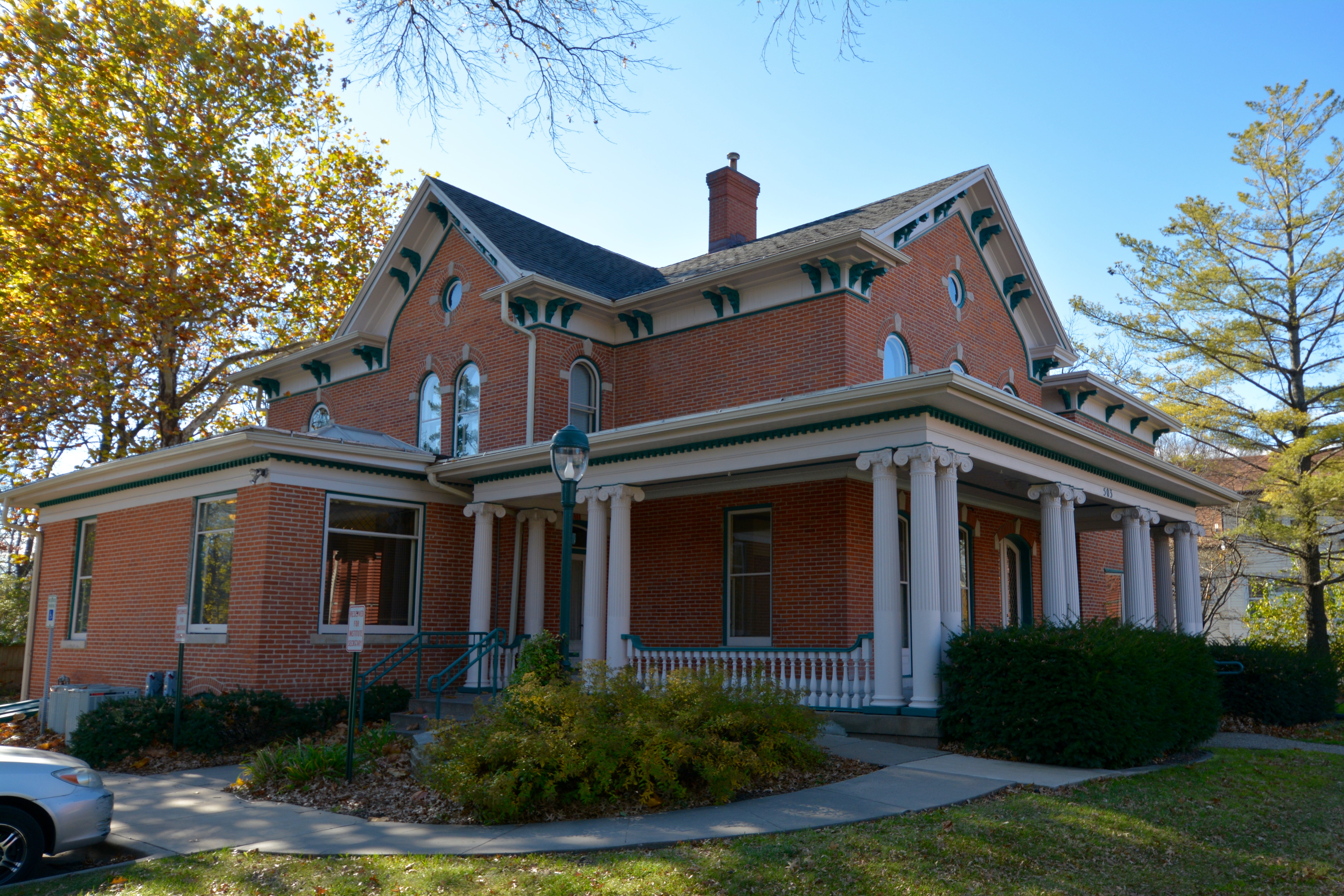

- Location within Iowa Location within the United States
- Location: 503 Melrose Ave. Iowa City, Iowa
- Coordinates: 41°39′23.5″N 91°32′45.4″W
- Area: less than one acre
- Built: 1885
- Architectural style: Italianate
- Part of: Melrose Historic District (ID04001321)
- NRHP reference No.: 83000378
- Added to NRHP: February 3, 1983

The A. W. Pratt House, also known as the Pratt-Soper House, is a historic building located in Iowa City, Iowa, United States. The A. W. and Fanny Pratt family was among the first settlers in Johnson County. Albert W. Pratt, who had this house built in 1885, was one of their seven children. At the time it was built, this area was outside of the city limits. The two-story brick structure features round arch windows with keystones, double brackets under the eaves, and a broad cornice. The wrap-around porch is believed to have been built around the turn of the 20th century, replacing the original. Walter I. Pratt built an addition onto the house for his Kimball pipe organ. That space was converted into bedrooms and a bath around 1966. The house was individually listed on the National Register of Historic Places in 1983. In 2004 it was included as a contributing property in the Melrose Historic District.
