= James Pratt Funeral Service =

Historic house in Connecticut, United States

- U.S. National Register of Historic Places
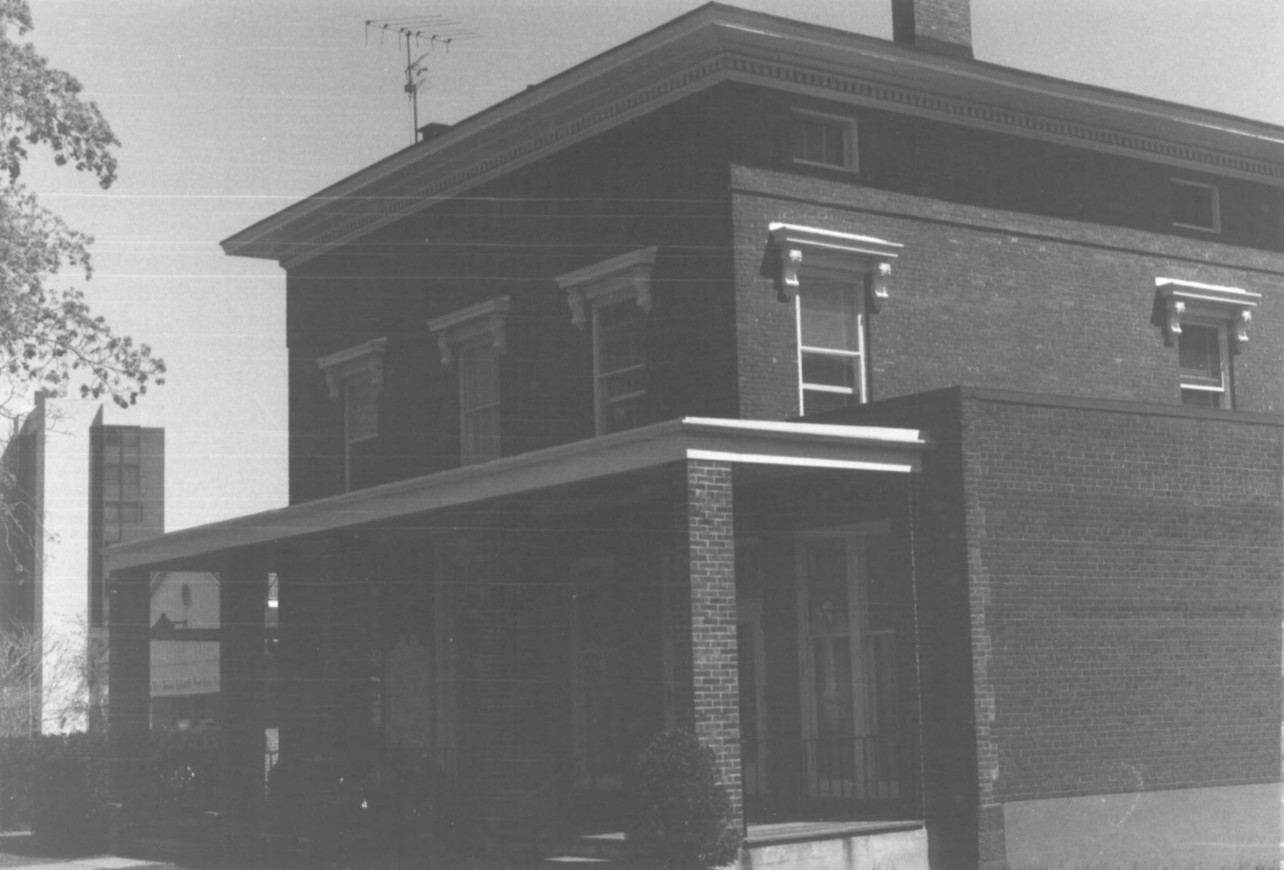
- 1978 photo

- Location within Connecticut Location within the United States
- Location: 69 Farmington Avenue, Hartford, Connecticut
- Coordinates: 41°45′59″N 72°41′29″W
- Area: less than one acre
- Built: 1860
- Architectural style: Italianate
- MPS: Asylum Hill MRA
- NRHP reference No.: 79002677
- Added to NRHP: November 29, 1979

The James Pratt Funeral Service was a historic house at 69 Farmington Avenue in Hartford, Connecticut. Built in 1860, it was one of the few surviving mid-19th-century houses on a once-residential stretch of that street. The house was listed on the National Register of Historic Places in 1979. It was subsequently demolished, and the property is now part of the Aetna campus.

== Description and history ==
69 Farmington Avenue was located on the south side of Farmington Avenue, between Flower Street and the main building of Aetna's corporate campus, an area now occupied by parking lots that are part of that campus. The house was two stories in height, built of brick and covered by a flat roof with an extended eave in the Italianate style. Second-floor windows were framed by Italianate hoods with drip moulding brackets supporting gabled pediments, an echo of decorations that probably also originally adorned other windows. A modern single-story porch extended across the front facade, sheltering ground-floor windows that were elongated in the Greek Revival style.

The house was built about 1860, and was at the time of its listing on the National Register one of only two houses to survive from that period on Farmington Avenue, which was at one time lined by many such houses. The building was converted to non-residential uses as the area became increasingly commercial. It was subsequently demolished as part of an expansion of the Aetna campus.

== See also ==
- National Register of Historic Places listings in Hartford, Connecticut
