= Pratt-Faxon House =

Historic house in Massachusetts, United States

- U.S. National Register of Historic Places
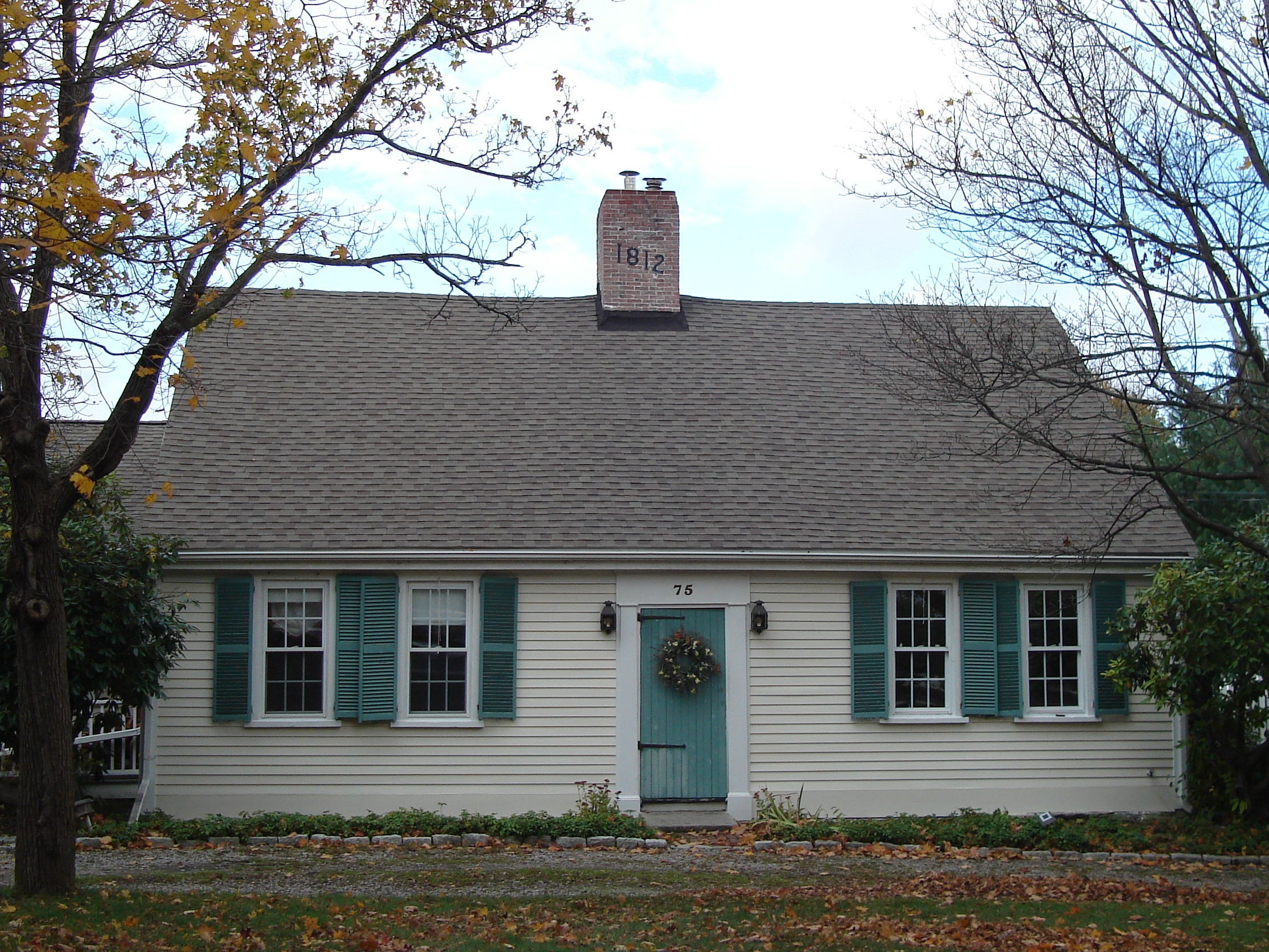

- Location within Massachusetts Location within the United States
- Location: 75 Faxon Lane, Quincy, Massachusetts
- Coordinates: 42°14′30″N 70°59′51″W
- Built: c. 1806
- Architectural style: Federal
- MPS: Quincy MRA
- NRHP reference No.: 89001331
- Added to NRHP: September 20, 1989

The Pratt-Faxon House is a historic house located at 75 Faxon Lane in Quincy, Massachusetts.

== Description and history ==
The 1 1/2-story Cape style house was built around 1806 by Thomas Pratt, and is one of only two surviving Federal period Cape houses in the city. It was acquired in 1812 by Job Faxon, whose family farmed the land until it was subdivided later in the 19th century. The house is five bays wide, with a side gable roof, central chimney, and clapboard siding. Its front entrance has simple pilasters framing a vertical board door.

The house was listed on the National Register of Historic Places on September 20, 1989.

== See also ==
- National Register of Historic Places listings in Quincy, Massachusetts
