= McKittrick Canyon =

Canyon in New Mexico and Texas, USA

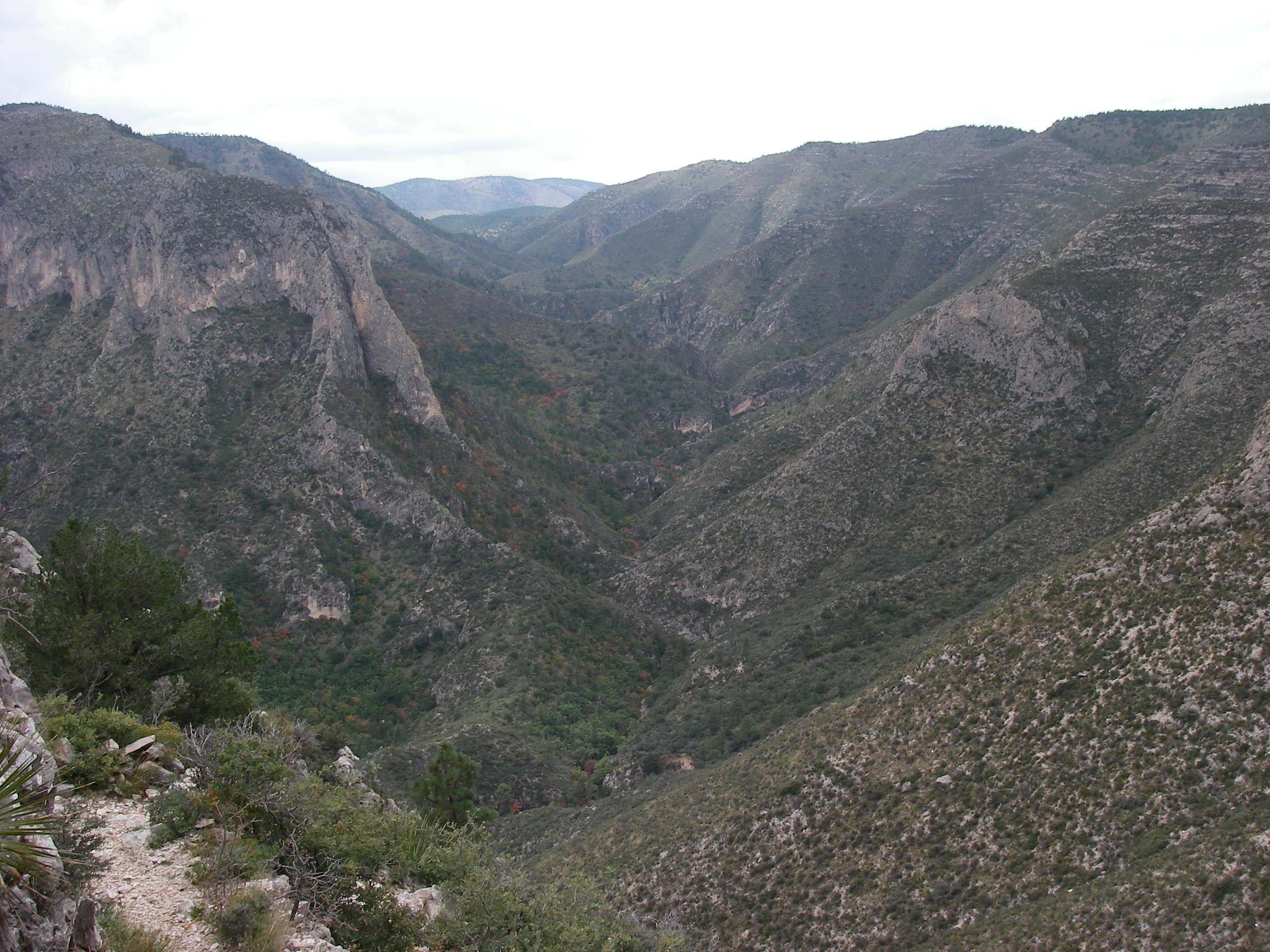
- South McKittrick Canyon from the Notch

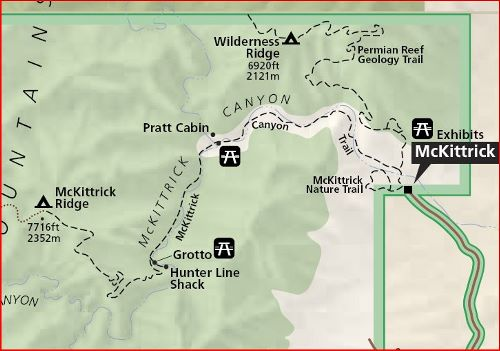
- Map of McKittrick Canyon and hiking trails
- Floor elevation: 4,997 feet (1,523 m)
- Long-axis direction: East-West
- Area: 5,632 acres (2,279 ha)
- Depth: 3,200 feet (980 m)

Geology
- Age: 12 million years

Geography
- Location: Culberson County, Texas, and Eddy County, New Mexico, United States
- Coordinates: 31°58′45″N 104°45′17″W
- Topo map: USGS Guadalupe Peak, El Paso Gap
- Traversed by: McKittrick Canyon Trail
- Rivers
- McKittrick Canyon Archeological District, Guadalupe Mountains National Park
- U.S. National Register of Historic Places
- U.S. Historic district
- Location: Address restricted
- Nearest city: Salt Flat, Texas
- Area: 411 acres (166 ha)
- NRHP reference No.: 91001381
- Added to NRHP: September 26, 1991

McKittrick Canyon is a scenic canyon within the Guadalupe Mountains of West Texas and Eddy County, New Mexico. The steep, towering walls of McKittrick Canyon protect a rich riparian oasis in the midst of the Chihuahuan Desert.

The majority of McKittrick Canyon is part of Guadalupe Mountains National Park, but is separated from the main park area and managed as a day-use only area with limited visitation hours. A large part of North McKittrick Canyon, though, is located in the Guadalupe Ranger District of Lincoln National Forest in New Mexico. Access to McKittrick Canyon is by a 4.2-mile (6.8 km) gated side road that leads to the mouth of McKittrick Canyon from U.S. Route 62/180. Here, the National Park Service maintains a parking area, restroom facilities, and visitor center, which is staffed most of the year by volunteers.

== McKittrick Canyon Trail ==
McKittrick Canyon Trail begins at the visitor center and initially follows a dry stream, crossing the stream bed several times as it works its way up the canyon. At first, the vegetation is more typical of the Chihuahuan Desert with various species of yucca, agave, and cacti, such as Spanish dagger (Yucca faxoniana), sotol (Dasylirion leiophyllum), ocotillo (Fouquieria splendens), lechuguilla (Agave lechuguilla), century plants (Agave americana), prickly pear (Opuntia spp.), and claret cup cacti (Echinocereus triglochidiatus). Scattered among these desert plants are a few hardy pines, junipers, and the occasional Texas madrone (Arbutus xalapensis), an unusual tree with red-colored bark that tends to curl up and peel off each year.

As one ascends into the relatively cool and more sheltered environment farther up the canyon, a flowing stream of clear water appears and riparian vegetation becomes more abundant, including deciduous trees such as oak, ash, and bigtooth maple (Acer grandidentatum). During the fall, McKittrick Canyon comes alive with color from the turning foliage of maple and hardwood trees. The bright colors stand in stark contrast to the surrounding Chihuahuan Desert.

After a distance of 2.4 miles (3.9 km), the path reaches the Wallace Pratt Lodge that was built by Wallace Everette Pratt (1885–1981), a petroleum geologist who once owned most of McKittrick Canyon. In 1959, Pratt donated 4,988 acres (2,019 ha) of his ranch to the National Park Service, and seven years later, on 15 October 1966, President Lyndon B. Johnson signed the act establishing Guadalupe Mountains National Park. On 30 September 1972, Guadalupe Mountains National Park was dedicated and formally opened to the public.

Farther up the canyon, the path becomes quite steep as it begins to follow a series of switchbacks, climbing nearly 2,000 feet (610 m) over the next two miles (3.2 km), eventually reaching "the Notch" at an altitude around 7,200 feet (2,200 m). From this high point, one can view McKittrick Canyon and the distant desert to the east and South McKittrick Canyon to the west.

A portion of the canyon was listed on the National Register of Historic Places for its archeological importance on 26 September 1991.

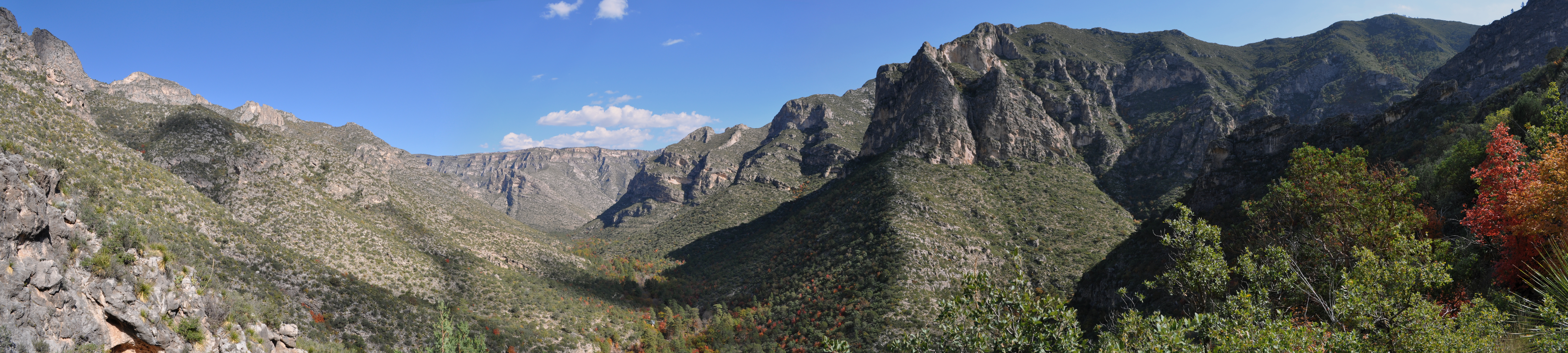
McKittrick Canyon Trail

== See also ==
- Carlsbad Caverns National Park
- Delaware Basin
- El Capitan (Texas)
- Guadalupe Peak
- Pecos River
- Trans-Pecos
- Van Horn, Texas
