= Guadalupe Mountains National Park =

National park in Texas, United States

- IUCN category II (national park)
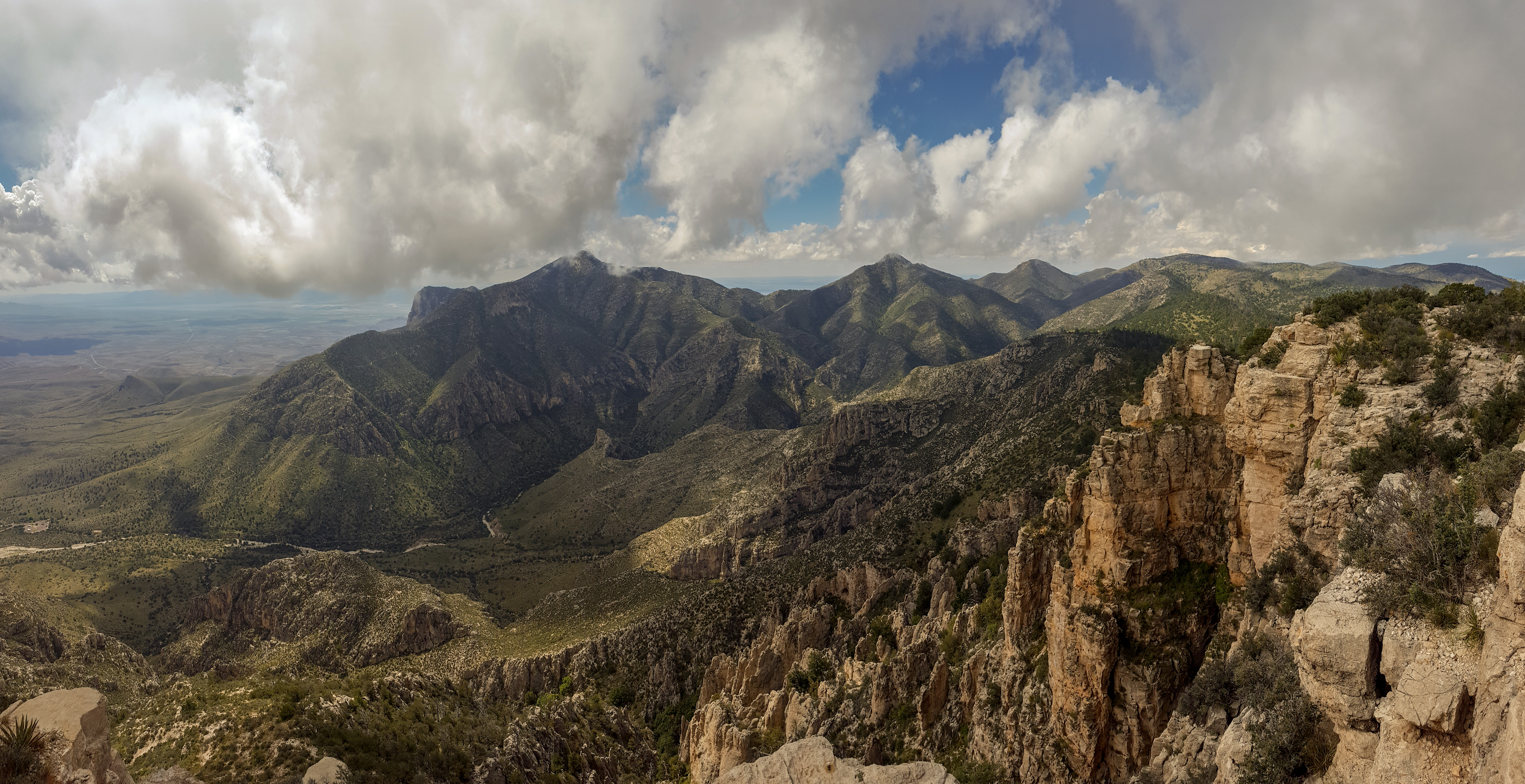
- Guadalupe Peak, the highest point in Texas, as seen from Hunter Peak
- Interactive map of Guadalupe Mountains National Park
- Location: Culberson County and Hudspeth County, Texas, US
- Nearest city: Dell City, Texas
- Coordinates: 31°55′N 104°52′W
- Area: 86,367 acres (349.51 km^{2})
- Established: September 30, 1972; 54 years ago
- Visitors: 206,423 (in 2025)
- Governing body: National Park Service
- Website: nps.gov/gumo

Guadalupe Mountains National Park is a national park of the United States in the Guadalupe Mountains, east of El Paso, Texas. The mountain range includes Guadalupe Peak, the highest point in Texas at 8,751 feet (2,667 m), and El Capitan used as a landmark by travelers on the route later followed by the Butterfield Overland Mail stagecoach line. The ruins of a stagecoach station stand near the Pine Springs visitor center. The restored Frijole Ranch contains a small museum of local history and is the trailhead for Smith Spring. The park covers 86,367 acres (134.9 sq mi; 349.5 km^{2}) in the same mountain range as Carlsbad Caverns National Park, about 25 miles (40 km) to the north in New Mexico. The Guadalupe Peak Trail winds through pinyon pine and Douglas-fir forests as it ascends over 3,000 feet (910 m) to the summit of Guadalupe Peak, with views of El Capitan and the Chihuahuan Desert. It was formally established as a national park on September 30, 1972.

The McKittrick Canyon trail leads to a stone cabin built in the early 1930s as the vacation home of Wallace Pratt, a petroleum geologist who donated the land. Dog Canyon, on the northern park boundary at the Texas-New Mexico State line, is accessed via Carlsbad, New Mexico or Dell City, Texas. Camping is available at the Pine Springs campground and at Dog Canyon. A public corral for livestock is available by reservation.

The Gypsum sand dunes lie on the west side of the park near Dell City. A rough four-wheel drive road leads to the Williams Ranch.

== History ==
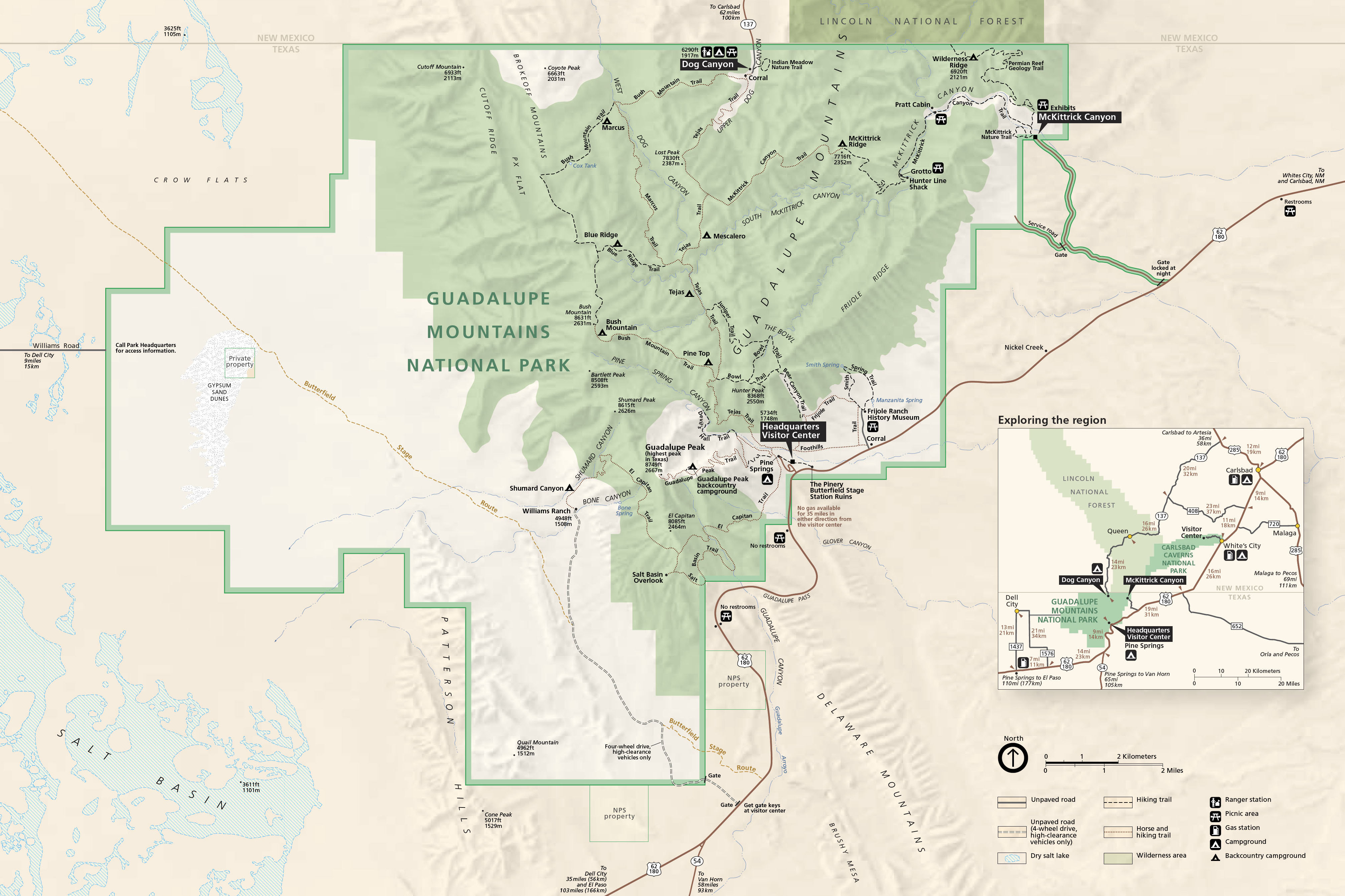
Park map (click map to enlarge)

The Guadalupe Mountains give their name to the Guadalupian series in the Permian period. The International Commission on Stratigraphy estimates the mountain range's age at 272–260 Mya. The mountains have had a tumultuous history for thousands of years. Archaeological evidence shows that people have lived there for over 10,000 years in and among the many caves and alcoves. Hunter-gatherers followed large game and collected edible vegetation, as evidenced by the discovery of projectile points, baskets, pottery and rock art.

The first Europeans to arrive in the area were the Spanish in the 16th century, but they did not make serious attempts to settle in the area. The Spanish introduced horses; nomadic indigenous tribes like the Apaches soon found them an asset for hunting and migrating. Mescalero Apaches followed game and harvested the agave (or mescal) for food and fiber (Mescalero is Spanish for mescal-maker). Agave roasting pits and other artifacts of Mescalero culture can be found in the park.

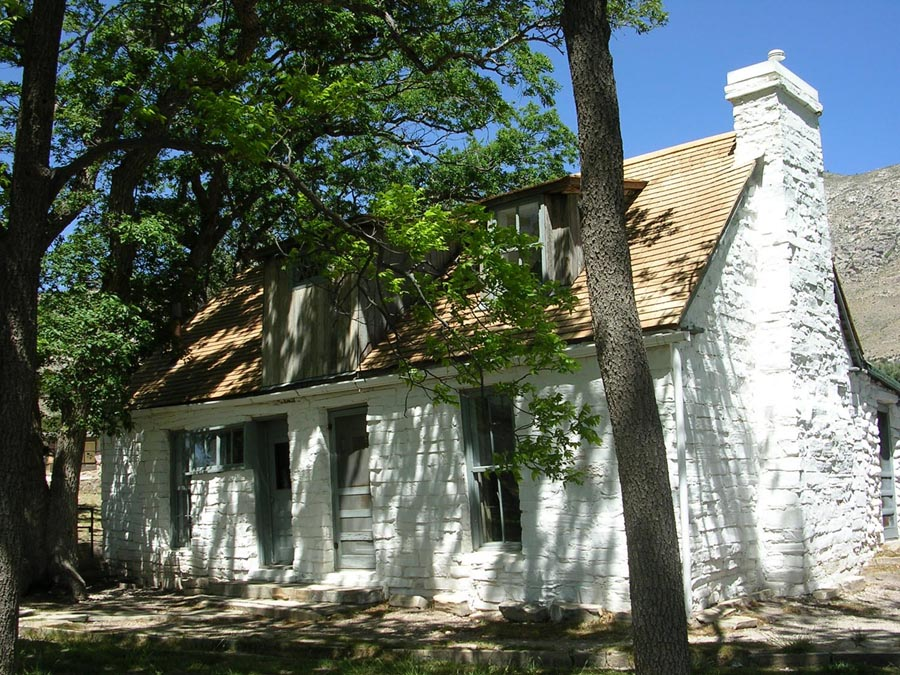
Frijole Ranch House

The Mescalero Apaches occupied the mountains through the mid-19th century, but were challenged by an American transportation route at the end of the American Civil War. During the 1840s and 1850s, many immigrants travelled west crossed the area. In 1858, Pinery Station was constructed near Pine Springs for the Butterfield Overland Mail. The Butterfield Overland Mail crossed Guadalupe Pass, located at 5,534 ft (1,687 m) above sea level. The 9th Cavalry Regiment was ordered to the area to stop Indian raids on settlements and the mail stage route. During the winter of 1869, Lt. H.B. Cushing led his troops into the Guadalupe Mountains and destroyed two Mescalero Apache camps. They were eventually driven out of the area and into US reservations.

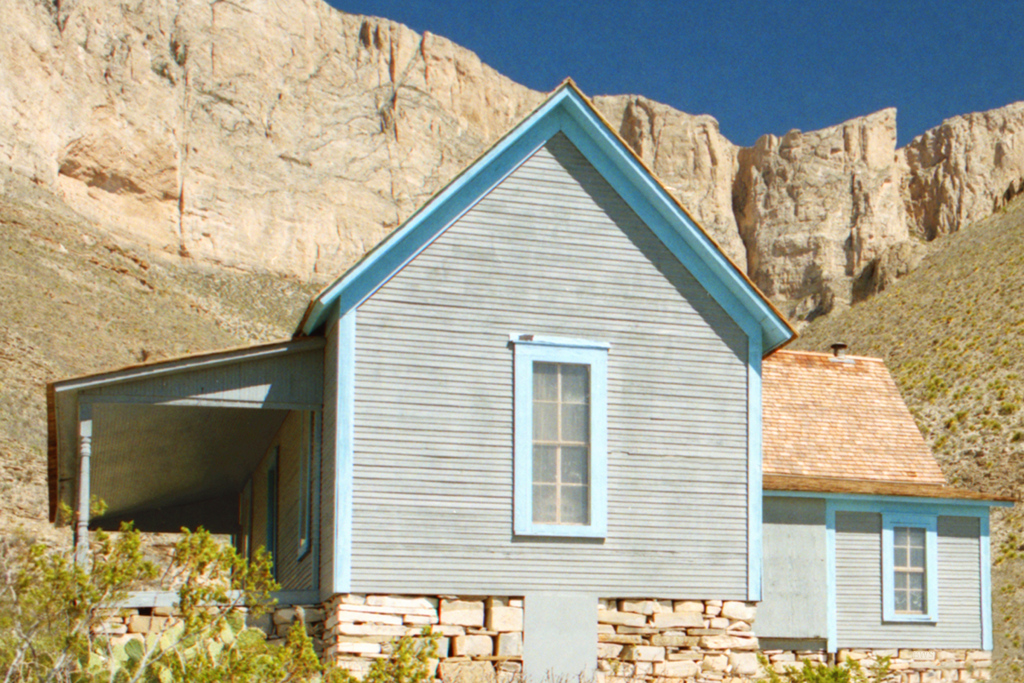
Williams Ranch House

Felix McKittrick was one of the first European settlers in the Guadalupe Mountains; he worked cattle during the 1870s. McKittrick Canyon is thought to be named after him. Frijole Ranch was the first permanent ranch house, constructed in 1876 by the Rader brothers. It became the only major building in the region and served as a community center and regional post office from 1916 to 1942. Today, it has been restored and serves as a cultural museum. In 1908 Williams Ranch House was built, and it was named after one of its inhabitants, James Adolphus Williams. Judge J.C. Hunter from Van Horn, Texas consolidated most of the smaller ranches in the area into the Guadalupe Mountain Ranch.

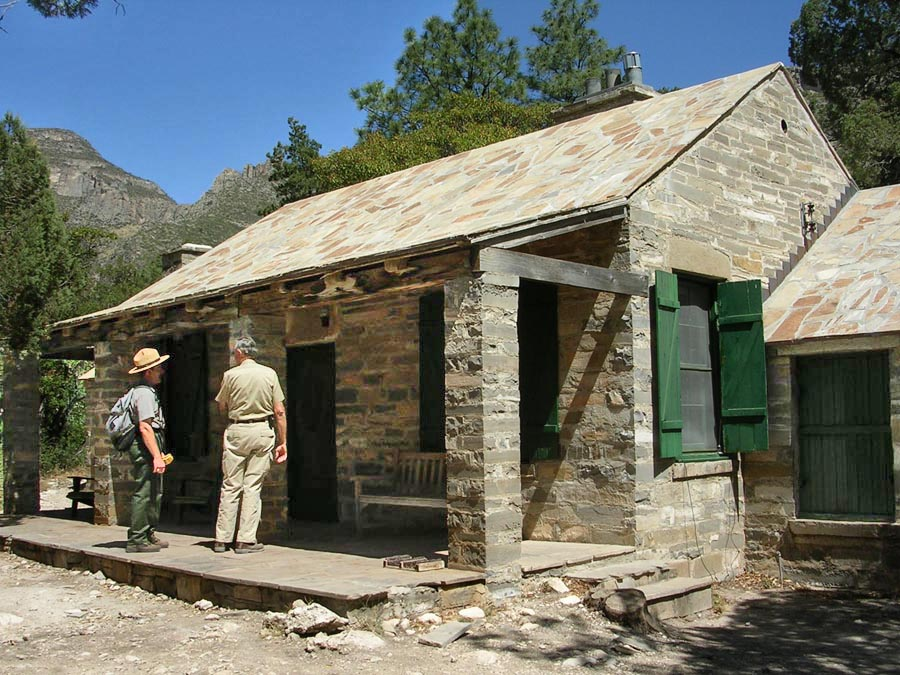
Wallace Pratt Lodge

In 1921, Wallace Pratt, a geologist for Humble Oil and Refining Company, was impressed by the beauty of McKittrick Canyon and bought the land to build two houses there.

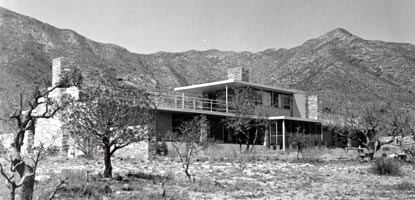
Ship on the Desert. Wallace E. Pratt Home

The two houses were:

- Wallace Pratt Lodge
- Wallace E. Pratt House (Ship on the Sea)

Both were used as summer homes by Pratt and his family up until 1960. Wallace Pratt donated about 6,000 acres (9.4 sq mi; 24.3 km^{2}) of McKittrick Canyon which became part of Guadalupe Mountains National Park, which was dedicated and formally opened to the public in September 1972.

In 1978, the United States Congress designated 46,850 acres (190 km^{2}) of the park as a wilderness area.

== Geography ==
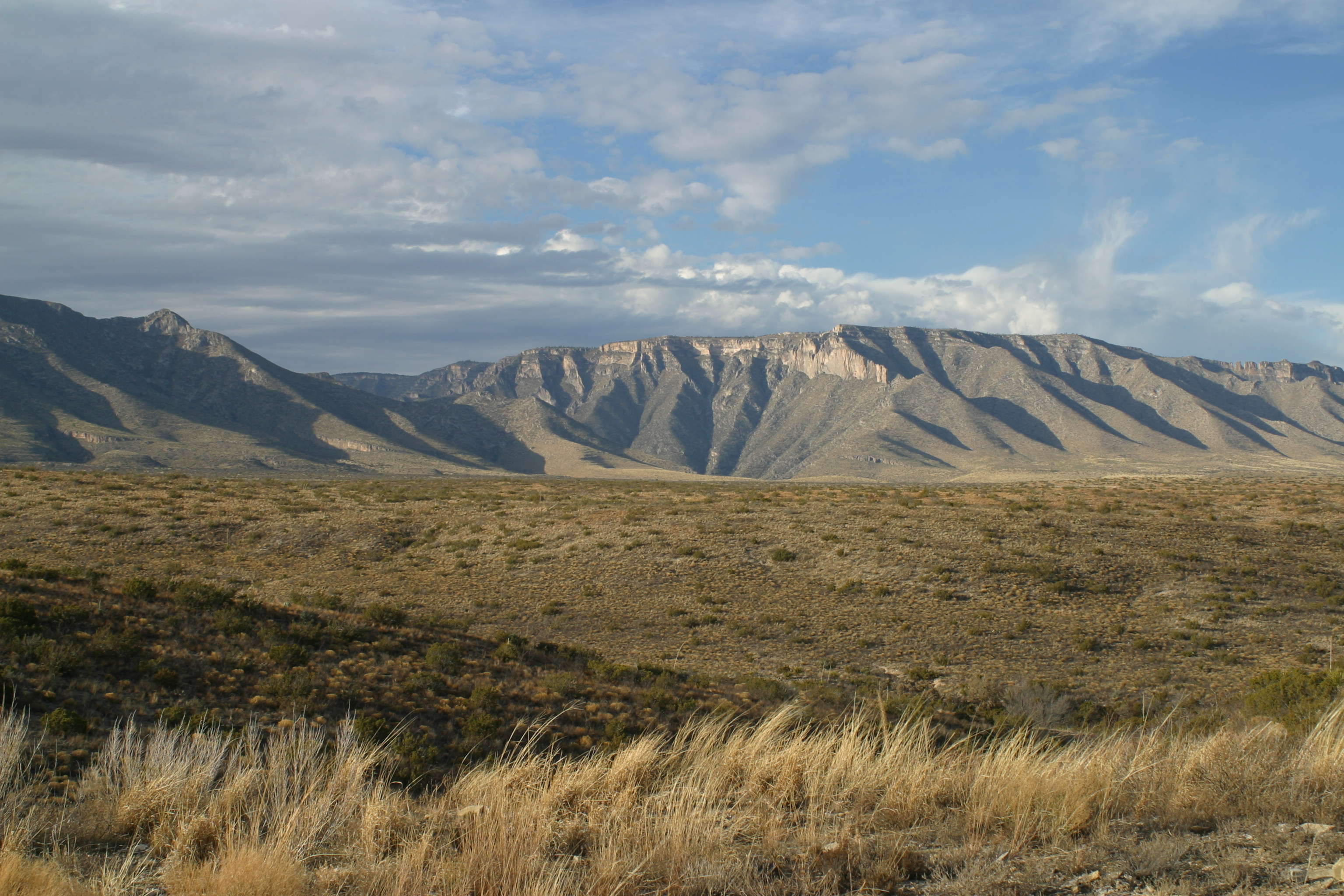
McKittrick Canyon from a distance

The Guadalupe Mountains reach their highest point at Guadalupe Peak, the highest point in Texas, with an elevation of 8,751 feet (2,667 m). The range lies southeast of the Sacramento Mountains and east of the Brokeoff Mountains. The mountain range extends north-northwest and northeast from Guadalupe Peak in Texas into New Mexico. The northeastern extension ends about 10 miles (16 km) southwest of Carlsbad, near Carlsbad Caverns National Park; the southwest tip ends with El Capitan about 90 miles (140 km) east of El Paso. The mountains rise more than 3,000 feet (910 m) above the arid floor of the Chihuahuan Desert. The Guadalupe Mountains are surrounded by the South Plains to the east and north, Delaware Mountains to the south, and Sacramento Mountains to the west.

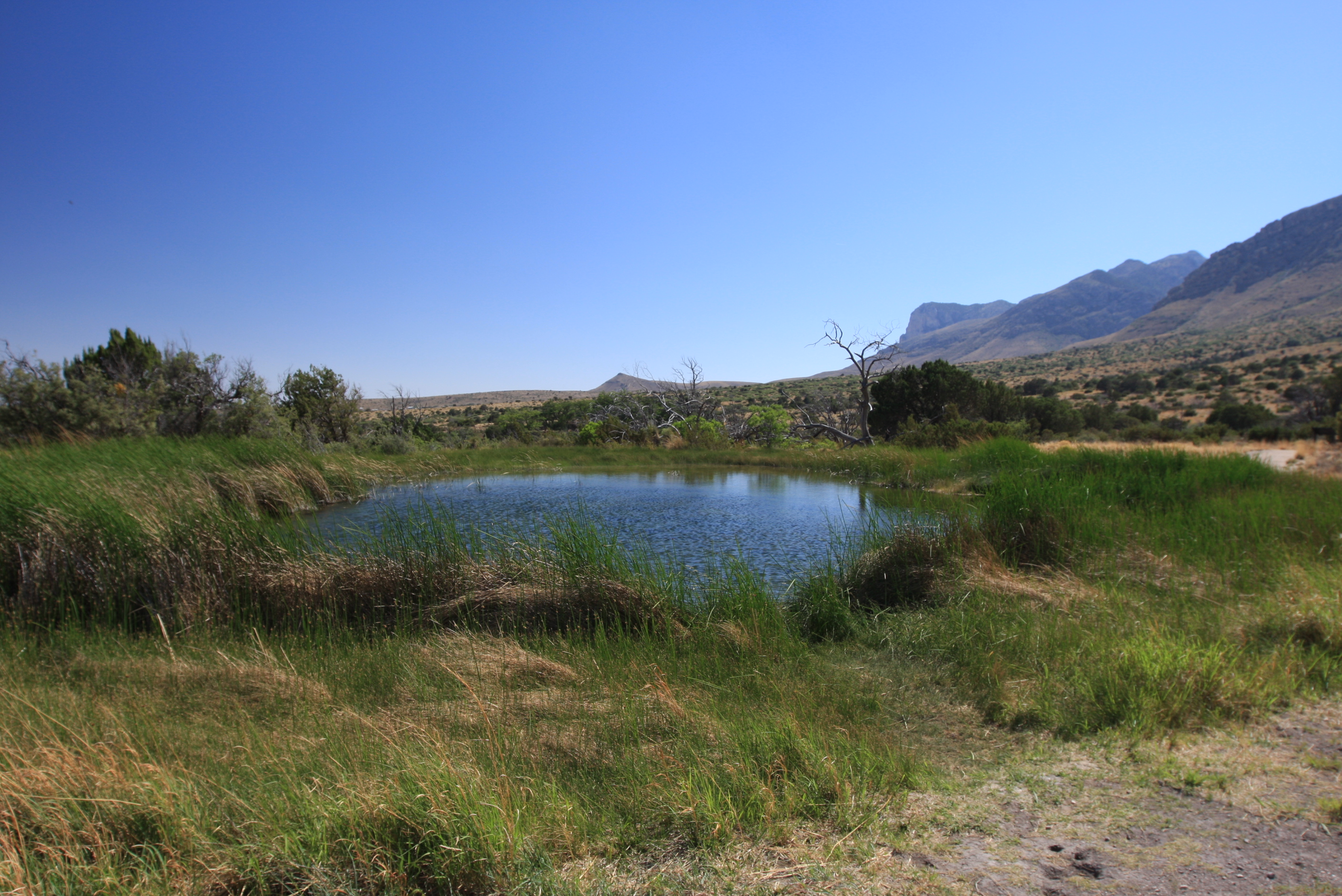
Manzanita Spring

The northwestern extension, bounded by a dramatic escarpment known as "The Rim", extends much further into New Mexico, approaching close to the Sacramento Mountains. The range is bordered on the north by Four Mile Canyon; on the east by the valley of the Pecos River; and on the west by Piñon Creek, Big Dog Canyon, Valley Canyon, Middle Dog Canyon and West Dog Canyon. Much of the range is built from the ancient Capitán Reef, formed at the margins of a shallow sea during the Permian Period. As the range is built up almost entirely of limestone, upland areas have little or no surface water. The only significant surface water is McKittrick Creek, in McKittrick Canyon, which emerges from the eastern side of the massif, just south of the New Mexico border. Elevations at the base of the range vary from 4,000 feet (1,200 m) above sea level on the western side to 5,000 feet (1,500 m) on the east. Several peaks on the southern end exceed 8,000 feet (2,400 m).

== Climate ==
According to the Köppen climate classification system, Guadalupe Mountains National Park has a cold semi-arid climate (BSk). The plant hardiness zone on Guadalupe Peak is 7b with an average annual extreme minimum temperature of 6.1 °F (-14.4 °C).

The Guadalupe Mountains experience relatively hot summers, calm, mild autumn weather, and cool to cold weather in winter and early spring. Snow storms, sleet storms, freezing rain, or fog may occur in winter or early spring. Frequent high wind warnings are issued during winter through spring. Late summer monsoons produce thunderstorms. Nights are cool, even in summer.

Climate data for Pine Springs, Texas, 1991–2020 normals, extremes 1987–2009
Month	Jan	Feb	Mar	Apr	May	Jun	Jul	Aug	Sep	Oct	Nov	Dec	Year
Record high °F (°C)	74 (23)	76 (24)	83 (28)	90 (32)	97 (36)	105 (41)	103 (39)	99 (37)	96 (36)	90 (32)	82 (28)	82 (28)	105 (41)
Mean daily maximum °F (°C)	53.9 (12.2)	56.2 (13.4)	63.4 (17.4)	70.7 (21.5)	78.8 (26.0)	87.8 (31.0)	87.2 (30.7)	84.4 (29.1)	80.1 (26.7)	71.9 (22.2)	61.0 (16.1)	53.9 (12.2)	70.8 (21.6)
Daily mean °F (°C)	42.7 (5.9)	45.1 (7.3)	51.5 (10.8)	58.2 (14.6)	67.0 (19.4)	75.7 (24.3)	75.6 (24.2)	73.2 (22.9)	69.1 (20.6)	60.8 (16.0)	50.1 (10.1)	43.5 (6.4)	59.4 (15.2)
Mean daily minimum °F (°C)	31.5 (−0.3)	34.1 (1.2)	39.5 (4.2)	45.7 (7.6)	55.2 (12.9)	63.5 (17.5)	64.0 (17.8)	62.0 (16.7)	58.0 (14.4)	49.7 (9.8)	39.2 (4.0)	33.2 (0.7)	48.0 (8.9)
Record low °F (°C)	1 (−17)	3 (−16)	9 (−13)	10 (−12)	31 (−1)	43 (6)	50 (10)	49 (9)	32 (0)	9 (−13)	8 (−13)	0 (−18)	0 (−18)
Average precipitation inches (mm)	0.63 (16)	0.70 (18)	0.54 (14)	0.50 (13)	0.85 (22)	1.52 (39)	2.78 (71)	3.11 (79)	2.29 (58)	1.34 (34)	0.96 (24)	0.77 (20)	15.99 (406)
Average snowfall inches (cm)	0.7 (1.8)	0.4 (1.0)	0.0 (0.0)	0.2 (0.51)	0.0 (0.0)	0.0 (0.0)	0.0 (0.0)	0.0 (0.0)	0.0 (0.0)	0.1 (0.25)	0.0 (0.0)	1.4 (3.6)	2.8 (7.1)
Average precipitation days (≥ 0.01 in)	4.1	4.4	3.8	2.8	5.4	6.9	9.2	9.6	7.7	6.6	3.8	4.7	69.0
Average snowy days (≥ 0.1 in)	0.2	0.1	0.0	0.1	0.0	0.0	0.0	0.0	0.0	0.1	0.0	0.3	0.8
Source: NOAA

Climate data for Guadalupe Peak. Elevation 8,749 feet (2,667 m).
Month	Jan	Feb	Mar	Apr	May	Jun	Jul	Aug	Sep	Oct	Nov	Dec	Year
Mean daily maximum °F (°C)	49.2 (9.6)	52.6 (11.4)	59.2 (15.1)	66.8 (19.3)	75.2 (24.0)	82.7 (28.2)	81.7 (27.6)	80.2 (26.8)	75.0 (23.9)	67.5 (19.7)	57.5 (14.2)	49.3 (9.6)	66.5 (19.2)
Daily mean °F (°C)	40.1 (4.5)	42.9 (6.1)	48.3 (9.1)	55.6 (13.1)	64.4 (18.0)	71.7 (22.1)	71.7 (22.1)	70.7 (21.5)	65.4 (18.6)	57.8 (14.3)	48.3 (9.1)	40.1 (4.5)	56.5 (13.6)
Mean daily minimum °F (°C)	31.0 (−0.6)	33.2 (0.7)	37.5 (3.1)	44.5 (6.9)	53.7 (12.1)	60.6 (15.9)	61.8 (16.6)	61.1 (16.2)	55.8 (13.2)	48.1 (8.9)	39.0 (3.9)	30.9 (−0.6)	46.5 (8.1)
Average precipitation inches (mm)	0.56 (14)	0.98 (25)	0.69 (18)	0.54 (14)	1.09 (28)	1.72 (44)	3.51 (89)	3.89 (99)	2.72 (69)	1.47 (37)	1.23 (31)	1.07 (27)	19.47 (495)
Average relative humidity (%)	40.5	37.5	32.4	27.3	28.7	33.6	46.3	53.5	52.6	44.3	38.4	41.2	39.7
Average dew point °F (°C)	18.0 (−7.8)	18.7 (−7.4)	20.1 (−6.6)	22.4 (−5.3)	31.2 (−0.4)	41.5 (5.3)	50.0 (10.0)	53.0 (11.7)	47.6 (8.7)	36.2 (2.3)	24.1 (−4.4)	18.4 (−7.6)	31.8 (−0.1)
Source: PRISM Climate Group

== Ecology ==
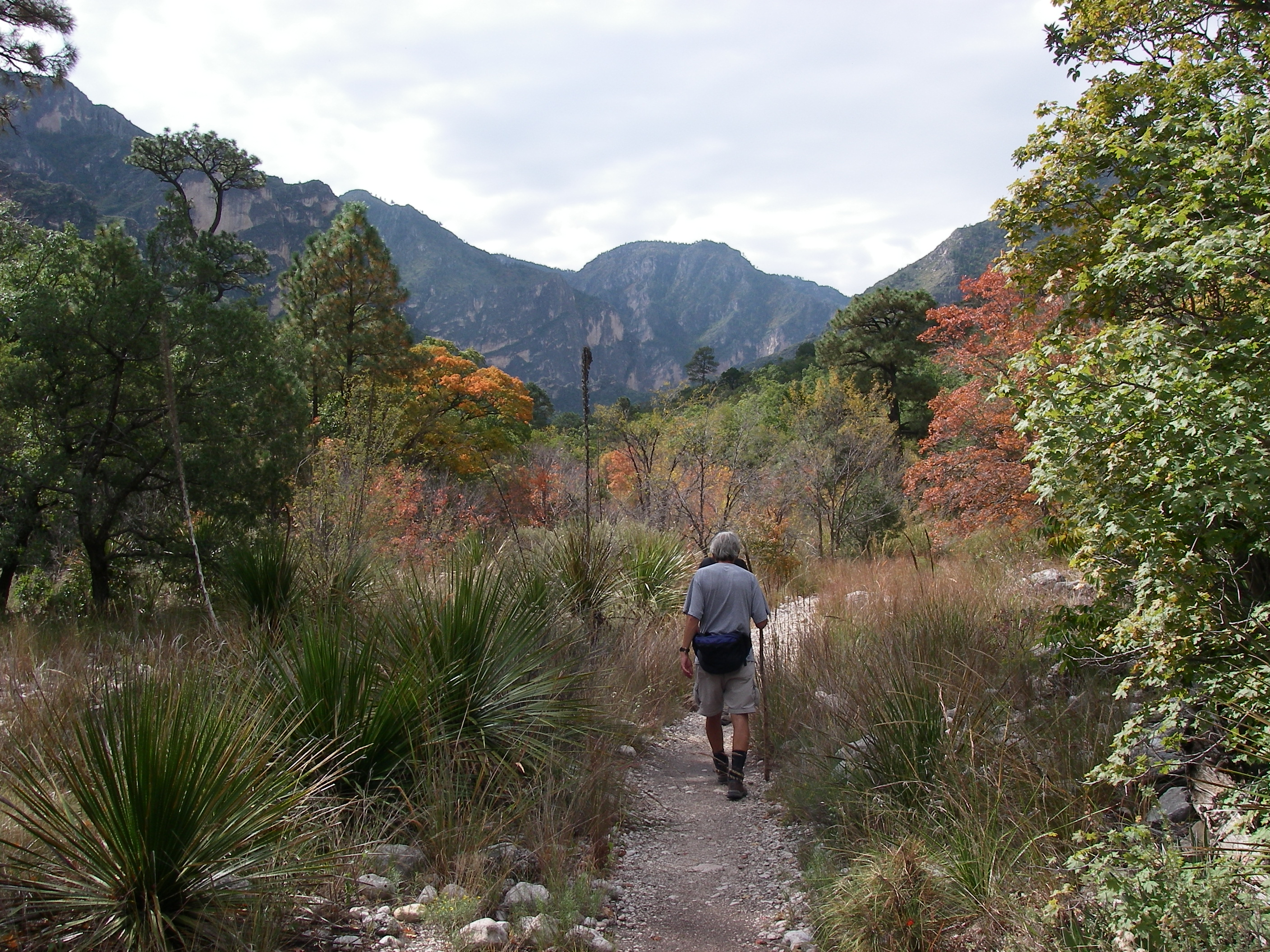
McKittrick Canyon Trail

Three major ecosystems are contained within the park. The Chihuahuan Desert exhibits salt flats, creosote bushes, and honey mesquite on the western side of the park, with low elevations on the eastern side covered with grassland, pinyon pine, and junipers. The canyon interiors, including McKittrick, Bear, and Pine Springs Canyon, exhibit bigtooth maple, velvet ash, chinkapin oak, and other deciduous trees that are fed by springs recharged by mountain streams. Finally, alpine areas more than 7,000 ft (2,100 m) above sea level contain forests of ponderosa pine, Arizona pine, southwestern white pine, Rocky Mountain Douglas-fir, alligator juniper, and small stands of quaking aspen.

The range contains many large cave systems, including Carlsbad Caverns and Lechuguilla Cave. The history of the range includes occupation by ancient Pueblo and Mogollon peoples, and by the Apache and various outlaws in the 19th century.

=== Flora ===
The park is home to over 1000 species of plants, some of which include cacti, succulents, wildflowers, grasses and shrubs. Viola guadalupensis, the Guadalupe Mountains violet, is a rare plant that is endemic to the park.

=== Fauna ===
Mammals that inhabit this national park include elk, javelina, gray fox, American black bear, coyote, bobcat, striped and hog-nosed skunk, badger, sixteen species of bat, mule deer, and mountain lion. Birds of this park include great horned owl, chickadee, sparrow, woodpecker, turkey vulture, greater roadrunner, hummingbird, peregrine falcon, golden eagle, wren, and grosbeak.

== See also ==
- List of birds of Guadalupe Mountains National Park
- List of national parks of the United States
