= Salt Flat =

Salt Flat, Texas
- Ghost town
- Location within Texas Location within the United States
- Coordinates: 31°44′37″N 105°5′34″W
- Country: United States
- State: Texas
- County: Hudspeth F
- Elevation: 3,730 ft (1,140 m)
- Time zone: UTC−07:00 (Mountain (CST))
  - Summer (DST): UTC−06:00 (MDT)
- ZIP Code: 79847
- GNIS feature ID: 1367427

Salt Flat is a ghost town in northeastern Hudspeth County, Texas, United States. It lies along the concurrent U.S. Routes 62 and 180, north of the Census-designated place (CDP) of Sierra Blanca, the county seat of Hudspeth County. Its elevation is 3,730 feet (1,137 m). Although Salt Flat is unincorporated, it has a ZIP Code of 79847. The headquarters of the nearby Guadalupe Mountains National Park uses this ZIP Code, although it is located closer to Pine Springs, which has no post office.

== Salt deposits ==
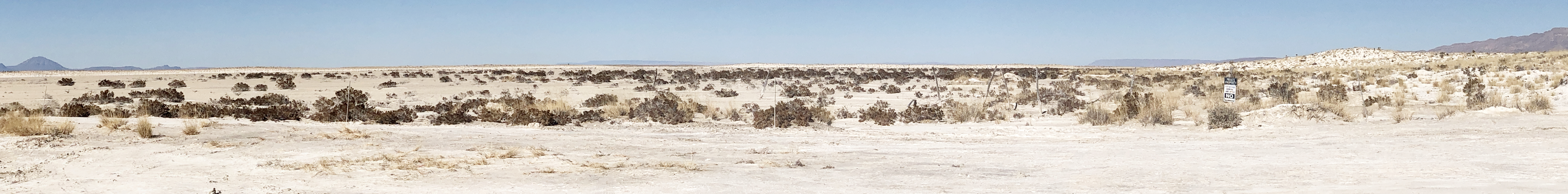
Panorama of the Salt Flat, Hudspeth County, Texas

Just outside the community, there is a dry salt pan called Salt Flat Playa or Salt Basin. It straddles the New Mexico-Texas border and is approximately 150 miles long, and five to 15 miles wide, making it one of the largest gypsum playas in the United States. The playa occupies the north-south oriented Salt Basin Grabben, which lies between the Guadalupe and Delaware Mountains on the east and the Sierra Diablo and Diablo Plateau on the west. The playa was originally a lake during the late Pleistocene epoch, but drying of the climate since then has left a salt pan. Today, a briny water table is about three feet below the surface. Capillary evaporation in the dry, hot weather pulls brine upwards and evaporite (gypsum, halite) and carbonate (calcite, dolomite) minerals precipitate. Cyanobacteria (blue-green algae) grow on the surface and immediately below the surface when the playa is wet. Alternating light and dark bands are either gypsum-rich (light) or dolomite-rich (dark) When the playa is dry during the summer, winds blow the gypsum into sand dunes.

The San Elizario Salt War was a dispute over ownership and access to these salt deposits.

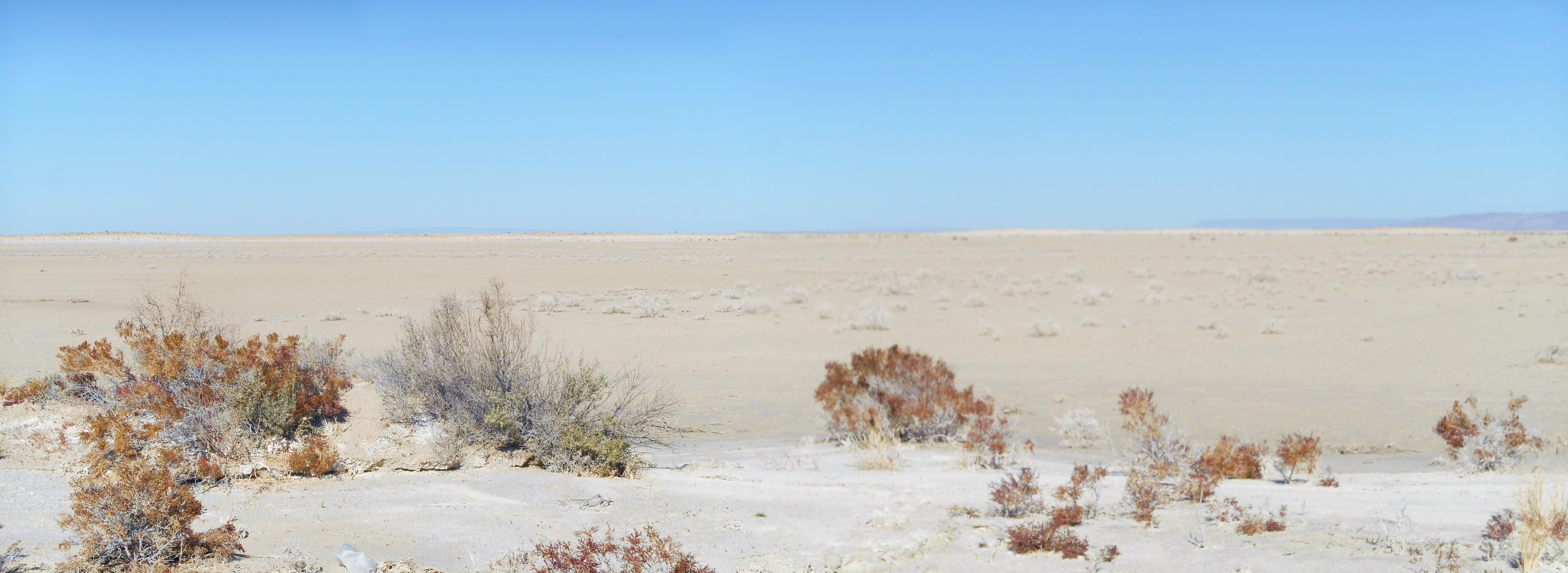
View across the gypsum playa of Salt Flat, Hudspeth County, Texas. The dark color is due to the surface being wet.

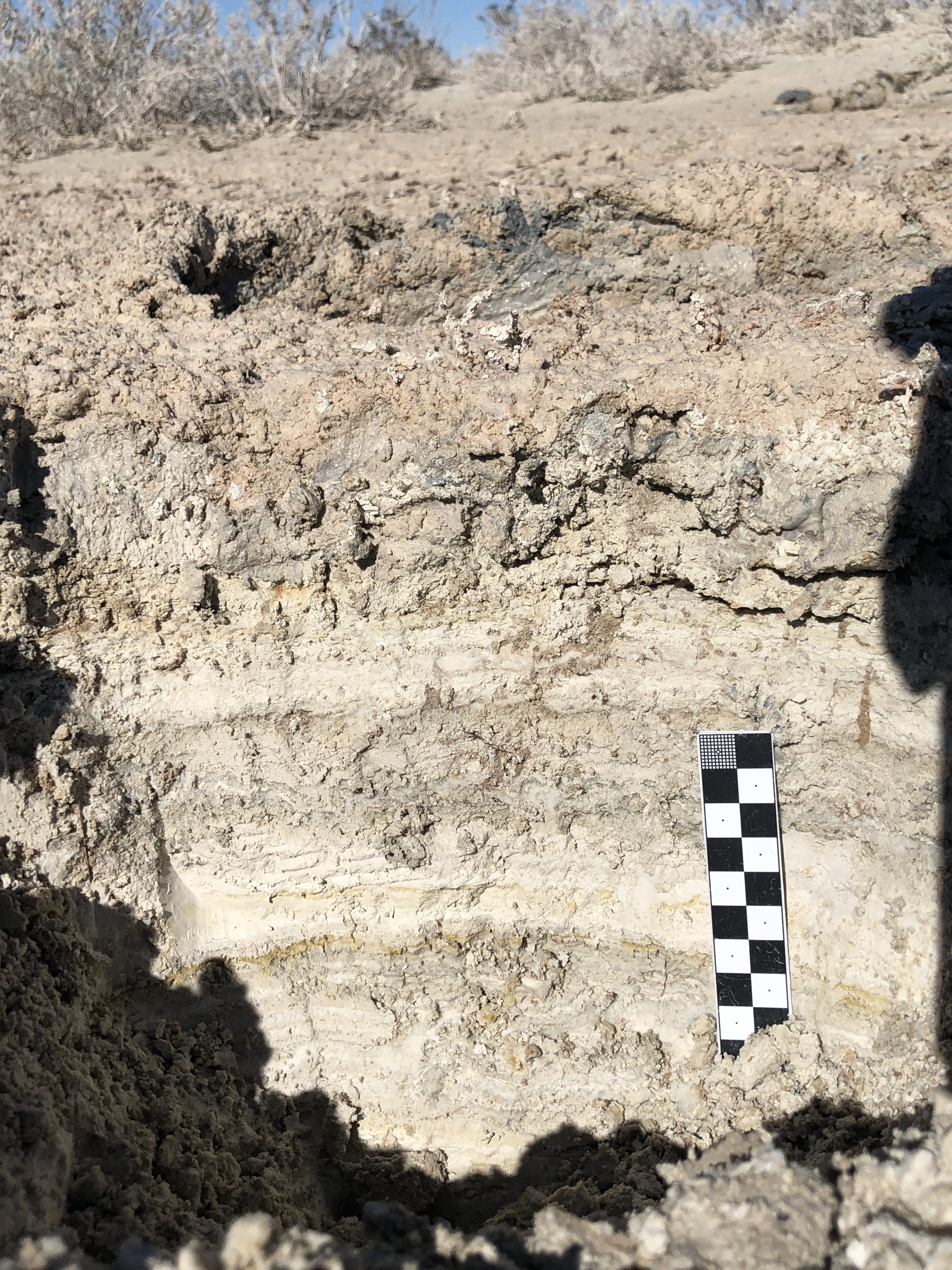
Alternating light and dark bands in the playa sediments.

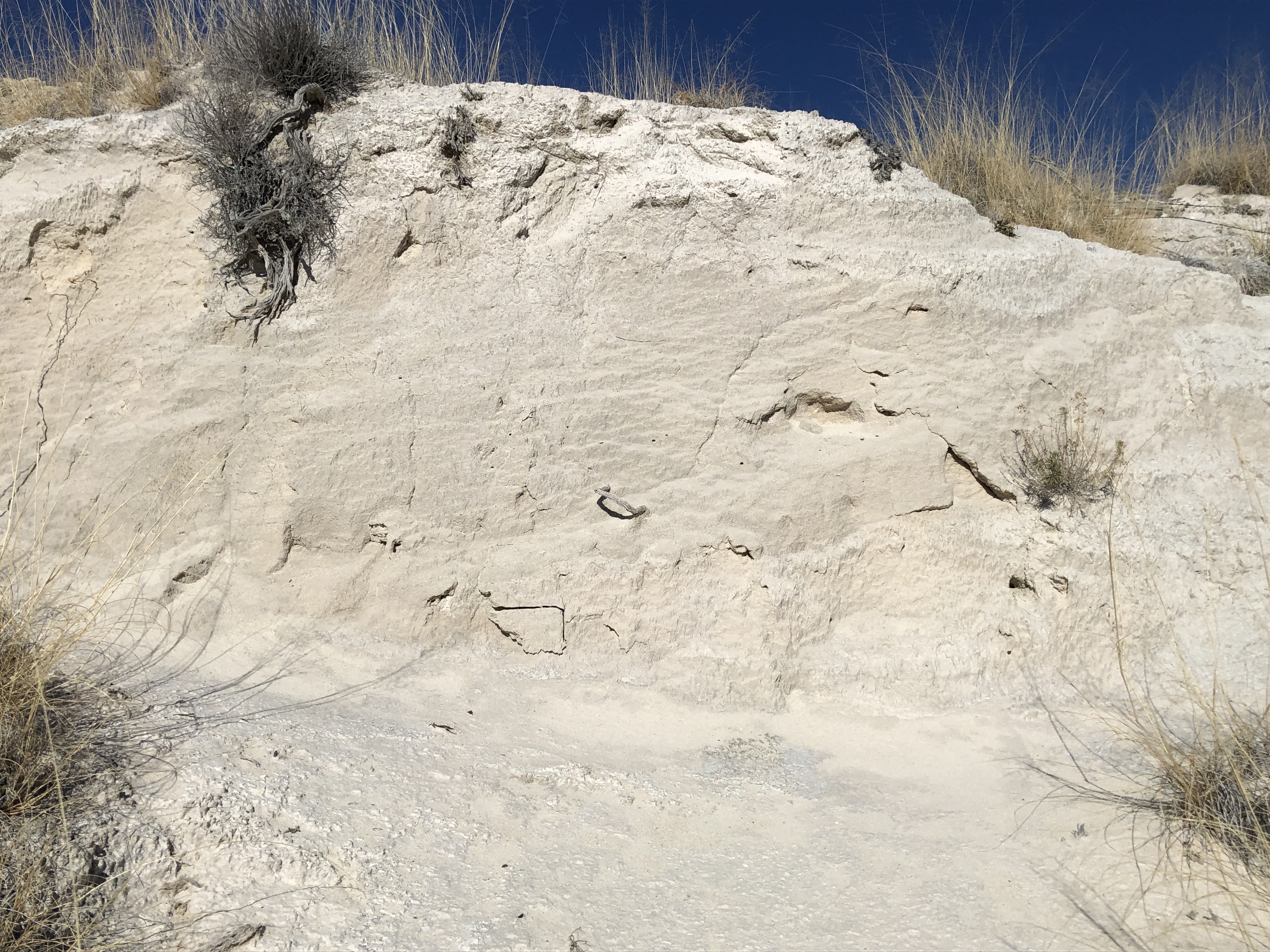
Cross-section of a gypsum sand dune on the west side of Salt Flat Playa.
