= Texas State Highway 54 =

State highway in Texas

State Highway 54

Route information
- Maintained by TxDOT
- Length: 54.932 mi (88.404 km)
- Existed: 1923–present

Major junctions
- South end: I-10 / US 90 in Van Horn
- North end: US 62 / US 180 near Pine Springs

Location
- Country: United States
- State: Texas
- Counties: Culberson

Highway system
- Highways in Texas; Interstate; US; State; Former; Toll; Loops; Spurs; FM/RM; Park; Rec
← US 54	→ SH 55

State Highway 54 (SH 54) is a 55.2-mile (88.8 km) highway maintained by the Texas Department of Transportation (TxDOT) that runs from Interstate 10 and U.S. Route 90 in Van Horn north to US 62 and US 180 between Salt Flat and Pine Springs near Guadalupe Mountains National Park. The route, located in western Culberson County, is largely isolated passing through no cities or towns beyond Van Horn and intersecting no other highways between Van Horn and its northern terminus. Within Van Horn, the route has intersections with Business Interstate 10-D and Farm to Market Road 2185.

The route was established early in the history of the Texas highway system originally beginning in Alpine and ending at the New Mexico state line near Carlsbad, NM. The route's length and termini have changed over the years as have the roads with which it intersect largely due to two factors. First in the early years was the development of the United States Highway system which incorporated many parts of the former length of the route and even resulted in the brief elimination of SH 54 as well as other former state highways it intersected. Later was the construction of I-10 at Van Horn that caused SH 54 to be extended to meet the Interstate and resulted ultimately in the realignment and eventual decommissioning of US 80 in western Texas and changes in the designation of the former route of US 80 through the town.

== History ==
This route was originally proposed in 1917 as part of a potential SH 10 beginning at the New Mexico state line, then proceeding south to Van Horn then southeast to Alpine before changing course to the northeast terminating in Fort Worth by way of Fort Stockton, Sonora, and Brady. In 1919, another proposal incorporated a route called SH 12 from New Mexico through Van Horn and then south to the Rio Grande. The road would then run parallel with the river to Brownsville and then travel along the Gulf Coast to Houston. In 1922, a further revision aligned this route similar to the current US 90 between Van Horn and Del Rio.

SH 54 was originally established as a highway beginning at SH 3 in Alpine following the current US 90 to SH 1 in Van Horn. This original designation occurred on August 21, 1923, replacing part of the severely reworked SH 12. On July 18, 1924, SH 54 was extended along the present SH 54 and along US 62 and US 180 to the New Mexico state line near Carlsbad, NM.

Over the next several years, many changes to the route were spurred by the creation of the United States Highway system. In 1927, US 90 was newly designated in Texas over a route that replaced the portion of SH 54 between Alpine and the combined route of the new US 80 and SH 1 in Van Horn. On January 18, 1928, SH 130, a predecessor of US 62 and US 180 was designated from the present northern terminus of SH 54 west to El Paso. It is unknown when SH 130 was constructed. On May 1, 1931, SH 3 was realigned westward concurrently with US 90 to Van Horn. SH 54 and SH 130 kept their designations as concurrent routes to US 62. In 1932, US 62 was created along SH 54 from the state line to SH 130 and then along SH 130 to El Paso. On January 24, 1936, the section east of SH 130 was transferred to SH 130. Between 1936 and 1940, US 90 was extended northward through Van Horn to US 62. On September 26, 1939, SH 54 and intersecting routes SH 1, SH 3, and SH 130 were all decommissioned in favor of their redundant U.S. highway routes. The decommissioning of SH 54 was short lived as US 90 was shortened on August 16, 1940 back to its previous terminus at US 80 in Van Horn, and SH 54 was again designated between Van Horn and US 62. In 1943, US 180 was designated over the route of US 62 at the northern terminus of SH 54. In 1953, construction began on FM 2185 from SH 54 in Van Horn into northeastern Culberson County. On July 30, 1976, SH 54 was extended westward over Loop 519 (US 80 Business) (now BI 10-D) and southward over US 90 to I-10.

Changes to the route and its intersecting highways occurred again after the construction of the I-10 bypass at Van Horn. In 1975, US 80 was realigned along I-10 with its former route through town designated as State Highway Loop 519 although it was signed as US 80 Business. The following year, SH 54 was extended southward to terminate at I-10. In 1990, the designation of Loop 519 was changed to Bus. I-10-D. One year later, US 80 was decommissioned throughout western Texas.

== Route description ==
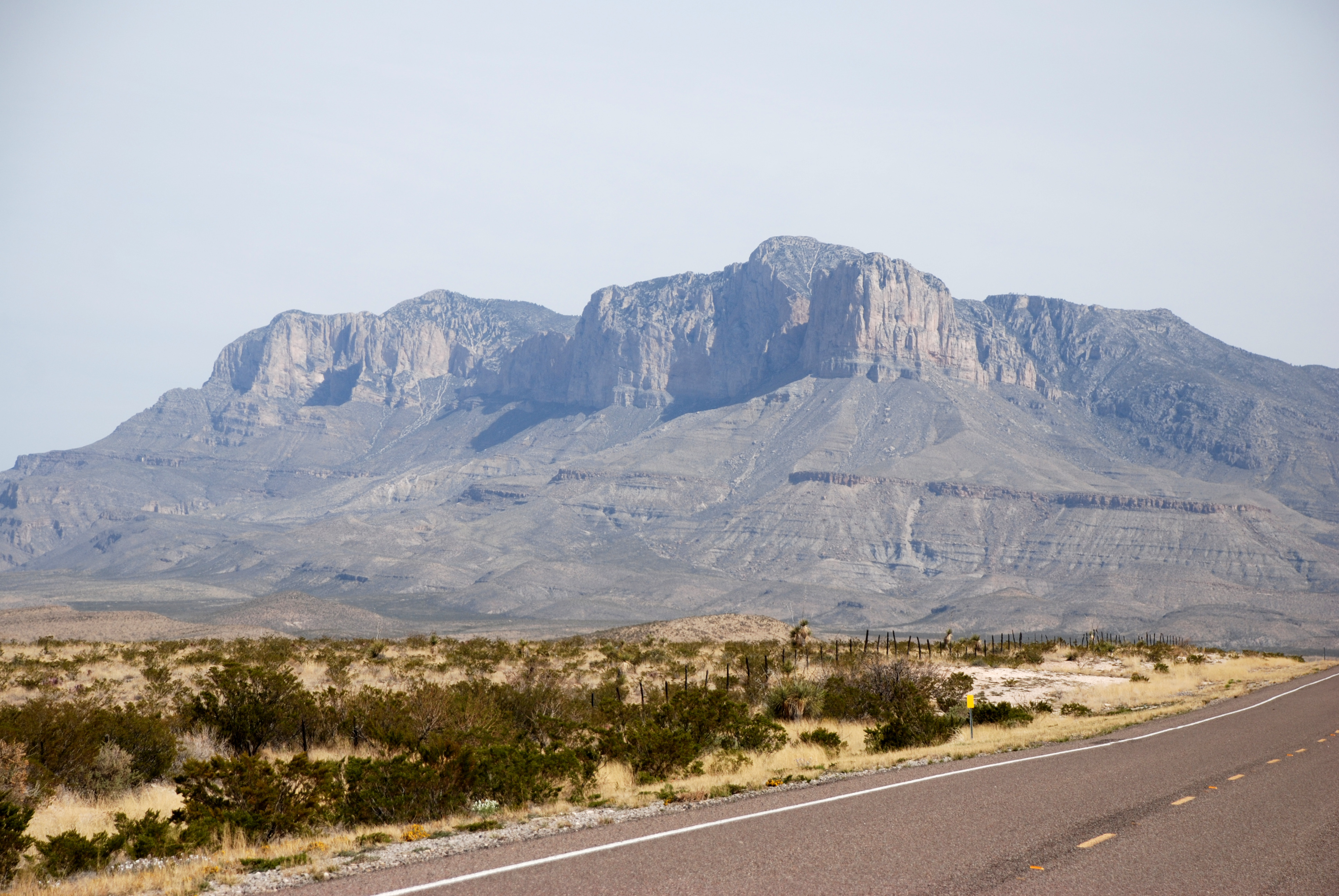
Guadalupe Mountains viewed from SH 54

SH 54 begins at I-10 Exit 140A in Van Horn. From I-10 the route runs concurrently with US 90 north along Van Horn Dr. At Broadway Blvd., US 90 terminates and SH 54 turns east along Bus. I-10-D for half a block and then turns north along La Caverna Street. The route intersects FM 2185 at Ninth Street before leaving Van Horn.

North of town, the route passes through a gap between the Beach Mountains and the Baylor Mountains and then emerges onto a large salt basin. The route follows the western edge of the basin east of the Sierra Diablo and the Texas Parks and Recreation Department's Sierra Diablo Wildlife Management Area until the route reaches its northern terminus at US 62 and US 180 between Salt Flat and Pine Springs near Guadalupe Mountains National Park. Between Van Horn and its northern terminus, the route is isolated encountering no major intersections. Beyond Van Horn, the only community along the route is the ghost town of Daugherty 30 miles (48 km) north of town.

== Major intersections ==
The entire route is in Culberson County.

Location	mi	km	Destinations	Notes
Van Horn	0	0.0	I-10 / US 90 – Sierra Blanca, Balmorhea, Valentine	Southern terminus; begin overlay of US 90
Van Horn	0.2	0.32	I-10 BL west (Broadway Boulevard)	Western terminus of US 90; Western end of concurrency with Bus. I-10-D; Bus. I-10-D is former US 80
Van Horn	0.3	0.48	I-10 BL east (La Caverna Street)	Eastern end of concurrency with Bus. I-10-D; Bus. I-10-D is former US 80
Van Horn	0.9	1.4	FM 2185 (Ninth Street)	
	55.2	88.8	US 62 / US 180 – El Paso, Pine Springs	Northern terminus
1.000 mi = 1.609 km; 1.000 km = 0.621 mi
