= Nickel Creek, Texas =

- Unincorporated community
- Location within Texas Location within the United States
- Coordinates: 31°55′18″N 104°44′48″W
- Country: United States
- State: Texas
- County: Culberson
- Elevation: 4,866 ft (1,483 m)
- Time zone: UTC-7 (Mountain (MST))
  - Summer (DST): UTC-6 (MDT)
- Area code: 432
- GNIS feature ID: 1363882

Nickel Creek, also known as Nickel Creek Station, is an unincorporated community in Culberson County, Texas, United States. According to the Handbook of Texas, the community had a population of 2 in 2005.

== Geography ==
Nickel Creek is located at the intersection of U.S. Routes 62 and 180, 63 mi (101 km) north of Van Horn and 5 mi (8.0 km) northeast of Pine Springs in northwestern Culberson County. It is near Guadalupe Peak.

== Education ==
Today, the community is served by the Culberson County-Allamoore Independent School District.
