= Culberson County, Texas =

County in Texas, United States

- County
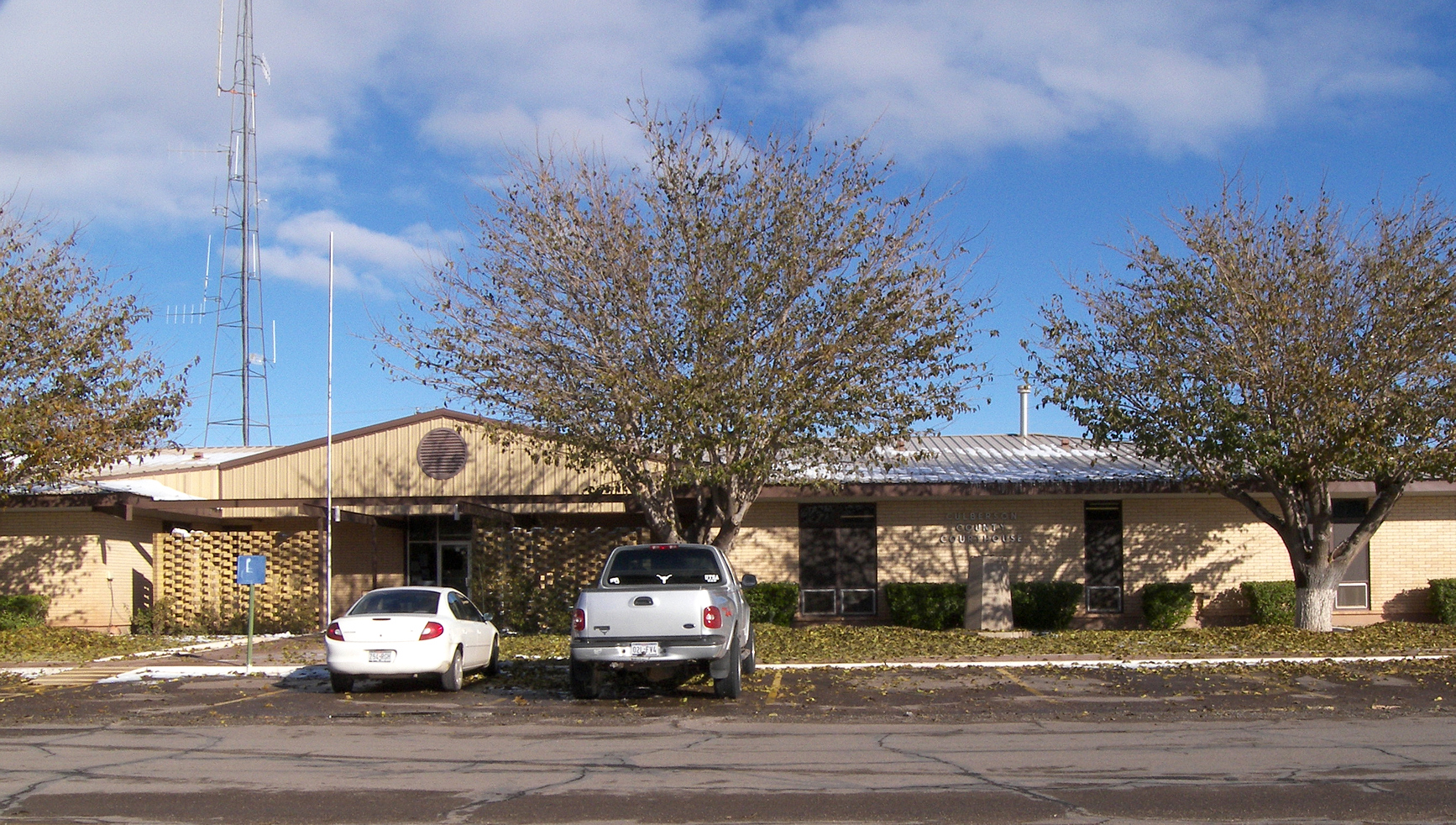
- Culberson County Courthouse in Van Horn

- Location within the U.S. state of Texas
- Coordinates: 31°27′N 104°31′W
- Country: United States
- State: Texas
- Founded: 1912
- Named for: David B. Culberson
- Seat: Van Horn
- Largest town: Van Horn

Area
  - Total: 3,813 sq mi (9,880 km^{2})
  - Land: 3,813 sq mi (9,880 km^{2})
  - Water: 0.2 sq mi (0.52 km^{2}) 0.01%

Population (2020)
  - Total: 2,188
  - Estimate (2025): 2,267 ▲
  - Density: 0.6/sq mi (0.23/km^{2})

Time zones
- most of county: UTC−6 (Central)
  - Summer (DST): UTC−5 (CDT)
- northwestern: UTC−7 (Mountain)
  - Summer (DST): UTC−6 (MDT)
- Congressional district: 23rd
- Website: www.co.culberson.tx.us

Culberson County is a county located in the U.S. state of Texas. As of the 2020 census, its population was 2,188. The county seat is Van Horn. Culberson County was founded in 1911 and organized the next year. It is named for David B. Culberson, a Confederate soldier and U.S. representative.

Culberson County is primarily in the Central Time Zone, but northwestern Culberson County, including Pine Springs and Guadalupe Mountains National Park, is in the Mountain Time Zone, making it one of only a few U.S. counties officially split into two time zones. It is one of the nine counties that comprise the Trans-Pecos region of West Texas.

== History ==
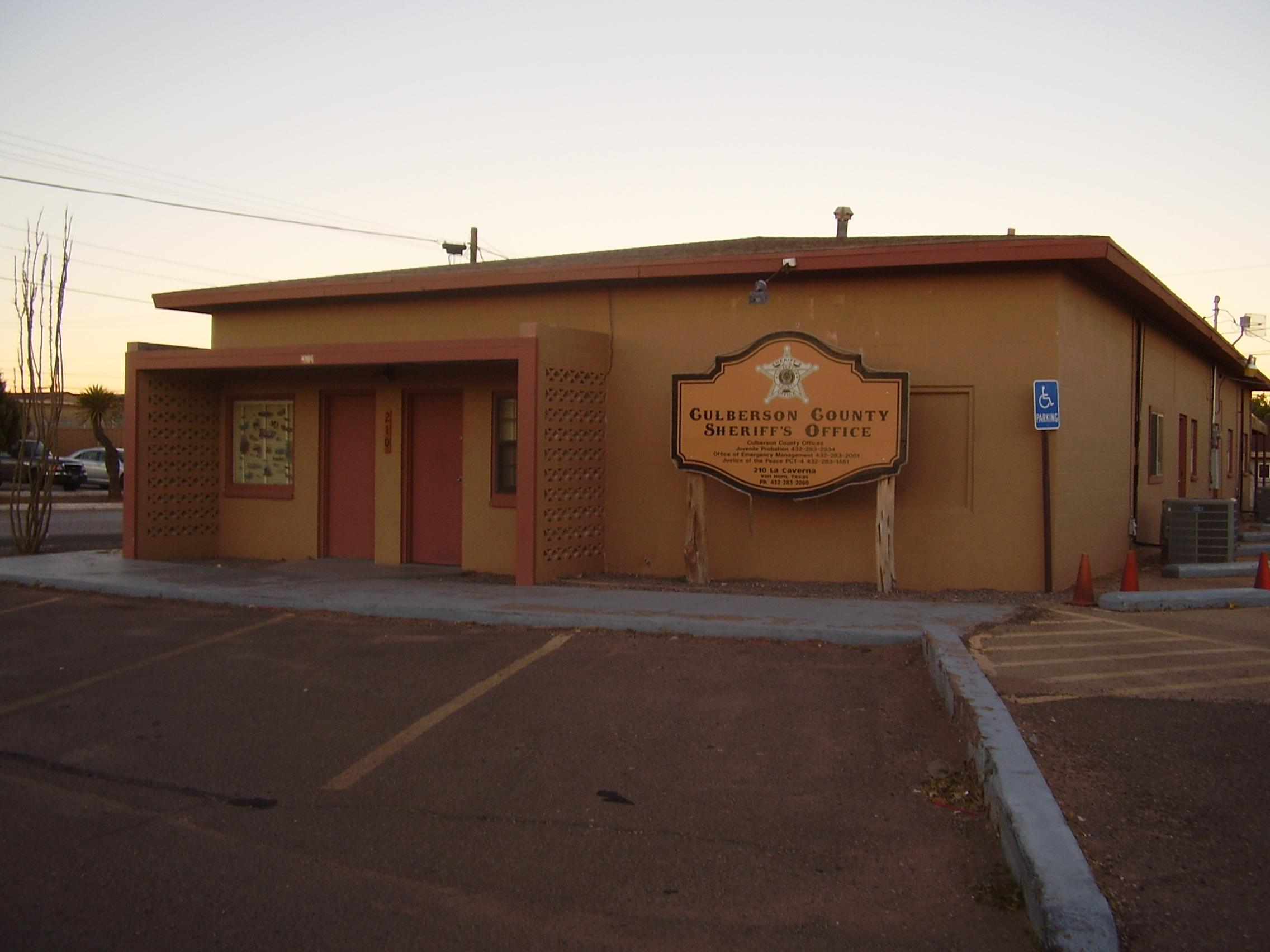
Culberson County Sheriff's Office

=== Native Americans ===
Prehistoric Clovis culture peoples in Culberson County lived in the rock shelters and caves nestled near water supplies. These people left behind artifacts and pictographs as evidence of their presence. With its treacherous topography, the area remained untouched by white explorations for centuries.

Jumano Indians led the Antonio de Espejo 1582-1583 expedition near Toyah Lake on a better route to the farming and trade area of La Junta de los Ríos. Espejo's diary places the Jumano along the Pecos River and its tributaries.

Antonio de Espejo was also the first white person to see the Mescalero Apache just east of the Guadalupe Mountains. The Mescalero frequented the area to irrigate their crops. In 1849, John Salmon "Rip" Ford explored the area between San Antonio and El Paso, noting in his mapped report the productive land upon which the Mescalero Indians farmed. By the mid-17th century, the Mescaleros expanded their territory to the Plains Navajos and Pueblos from the Guadalupes, and El Paso del Norte. Their feared presence in the area deterred white settlers. In January 1870, a group of soldiers attacked a Mescalero Apache village near Delaware Creek in the Guadalupe Mountains. In July 1880, soldiers at Tinaja de las Palmas attacked a group of Mescaleros led by Chief Victorio. August 1880, buffalo soldiers ambushed Victorio at Rattlesnake Springs. Victorio retreated to Mexico and was killed in October by Mexican soldiers.

=== Explorations ===
The demand for new routes from Texas to California caused an uptick in explorations. The San Antonio-to-El Paso leg of the San Antonio-California Trail was surveyed in 1848 under the direction of John Coffee Hays.

Texas Commissioner Robert Simpson Neighbors was sent by Governor Peter Hansborough Bell in 1850 to organize El Paso.

Lt. Francis Theodore Bryan camped at Guadalupe Pass while exploring a route from San Antonio to El Paso via Fredericksburg. Upon reaching El Paso in July 1849, his report recommended sink wells along the route. In July 1848, Secretary of War William L. Marcy wanted a military post established on the north side of the Rio Grande. Major Jefferson Van Horne was sent out in 1849 to establish Marcy's goal.

John Russell Bartlett, was commissioned in 1850 to carry out the Treaty of Guadalupe Hidalgo. Bartlett declared the Guadalupe Mountains dark and gloomy, and proposed a transcontinental railroad be built south of the peaks. Three years later, Captain John Pope was sent to scout out a railroad route, and in the succeeding year to search for artesian water supplies.

The San Antonio-San Diego Mail Line and the Butterfield Overland Mail both serviced the area 1857–1861. These mail coaches provided a means for travelers to reach California in 27 days if the passenger had the $200 for a one-way fare and was courageous enough to withstand the weather and dangers en route.

Rival railway companies began competing for rights of way. The Texas and Pacific Railway and the Galveston, Harrisburg and San Antonio Railway eventually reached an agreement to share the tracks.

=== County established and growth ===
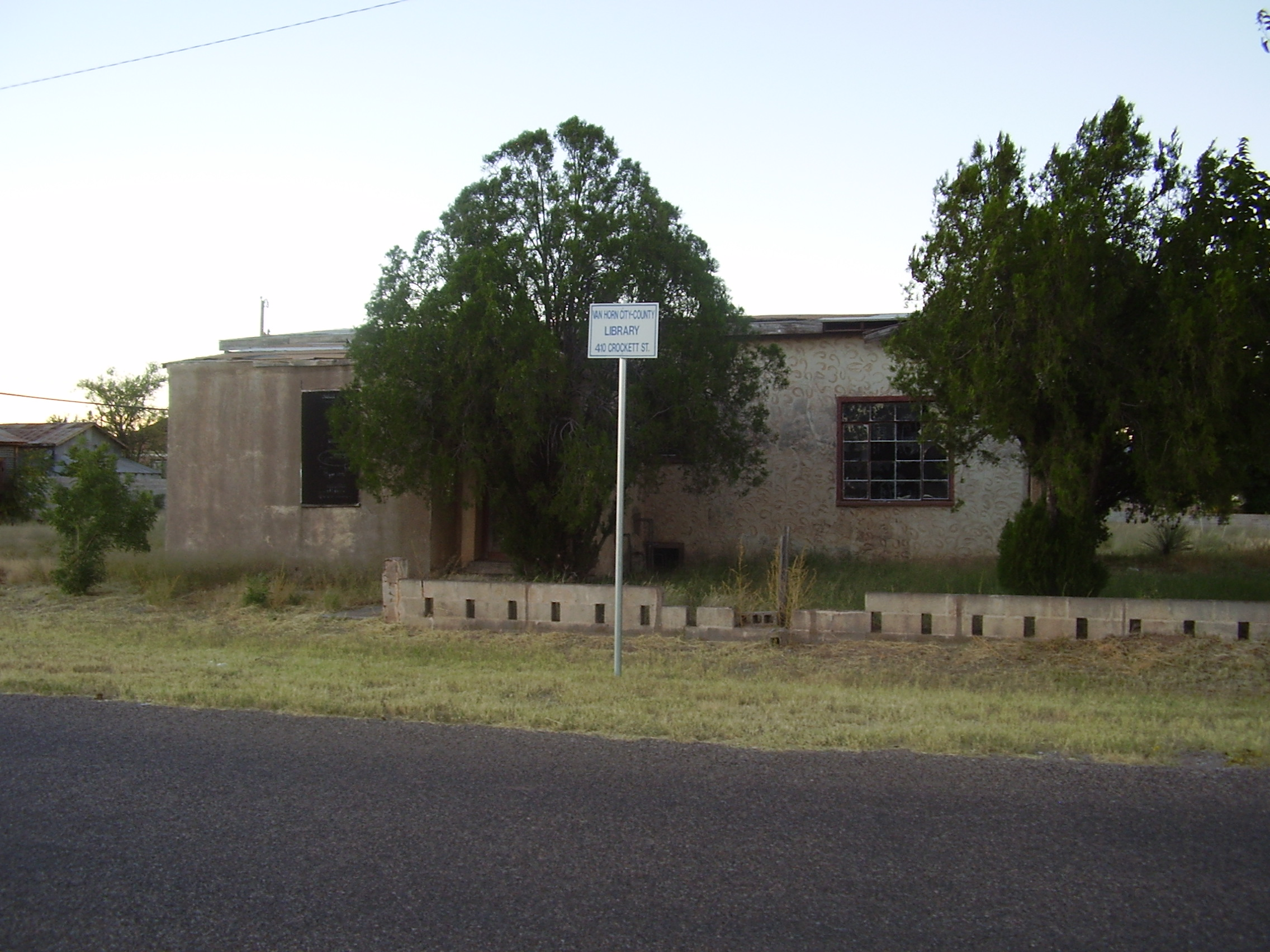
Van Horn City-County Library

Culberson County was established in 1911 from El Paso County and named after David B. Culberson. The county was organized in 1912. Van Horn became the county seat.

With the opening of the railways, ranchers began to settle in the county. Lobo was settled in part due to misrepresentation by promoters. A class-action lawsuit by the residents forced the promoters to build the Lobo Hotel. Unfortunately, the area was struck by two powerful earthquakes - one in 1929, and the 6.0 quake near Valentine that was felt as far away as Dallas. The hotel was destroyed.

Guadalupe Mountains National Park was established in 1972. President Lyndon B. Johnson signed the 1966 legislation to create the park. Stipulation was made that all mineral, oil, and gas rights had to be ceded to the federal government.

=== Space exploration ===
Blue Origin, the space vehicle development company founded by Jeff Bezos, maintains a suborbital launch site about 25 miles north of Van Horn, Texas.

== Geography ==
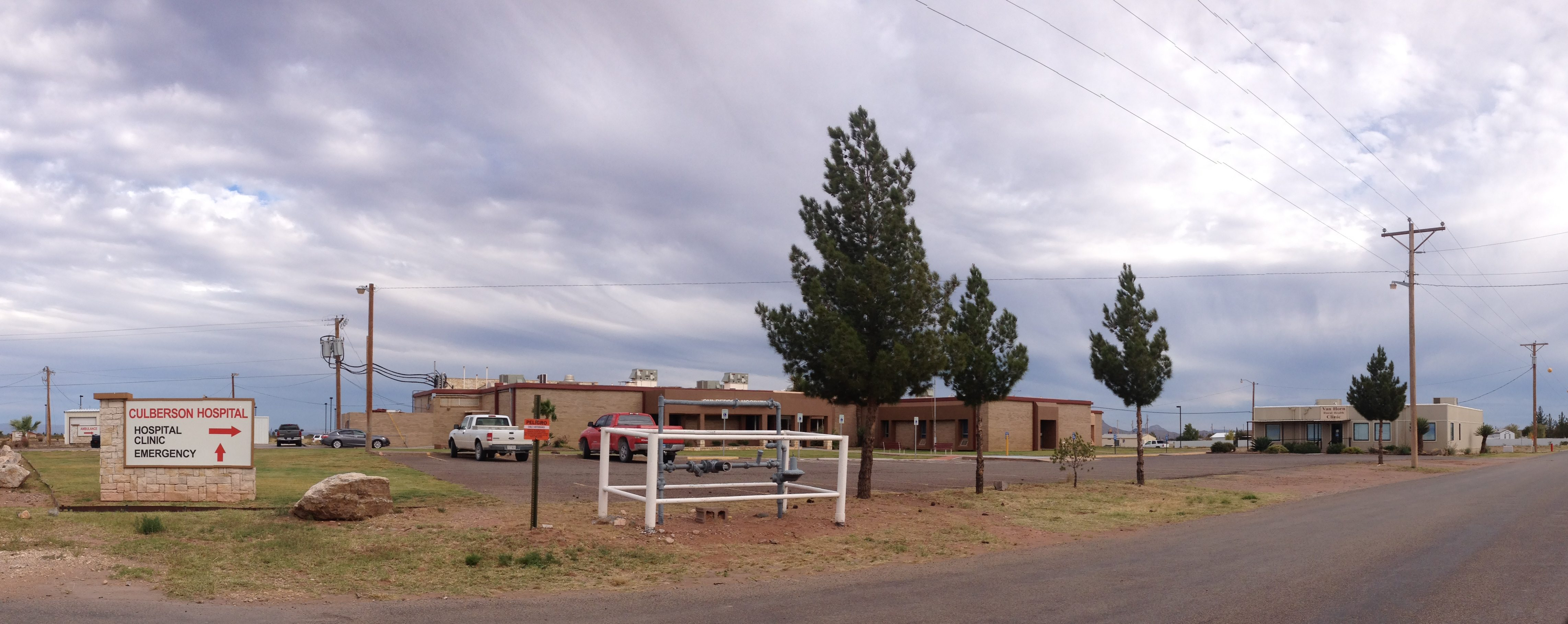
Culberson County Hospital and Van Horn Rural Clinic

According to the United States Census Bureau, the county has a total area of 3,813 square miles (9,880 km^{2}), of which 3,813 square miles (9,880 km^{2}) are land and 0.2 square miles (0.52 km^{2}) (0.01%) is covered by water. It is the fifth-largest county by area in Texas. The largest part of Guadalupe Mountains National Park lies in the northwestern corner of the county, including McKittrick Canyon and Guadalupe Peak, the highest natural point in Texas at 8,751 ft (2,667 m).

=== Major highways ===
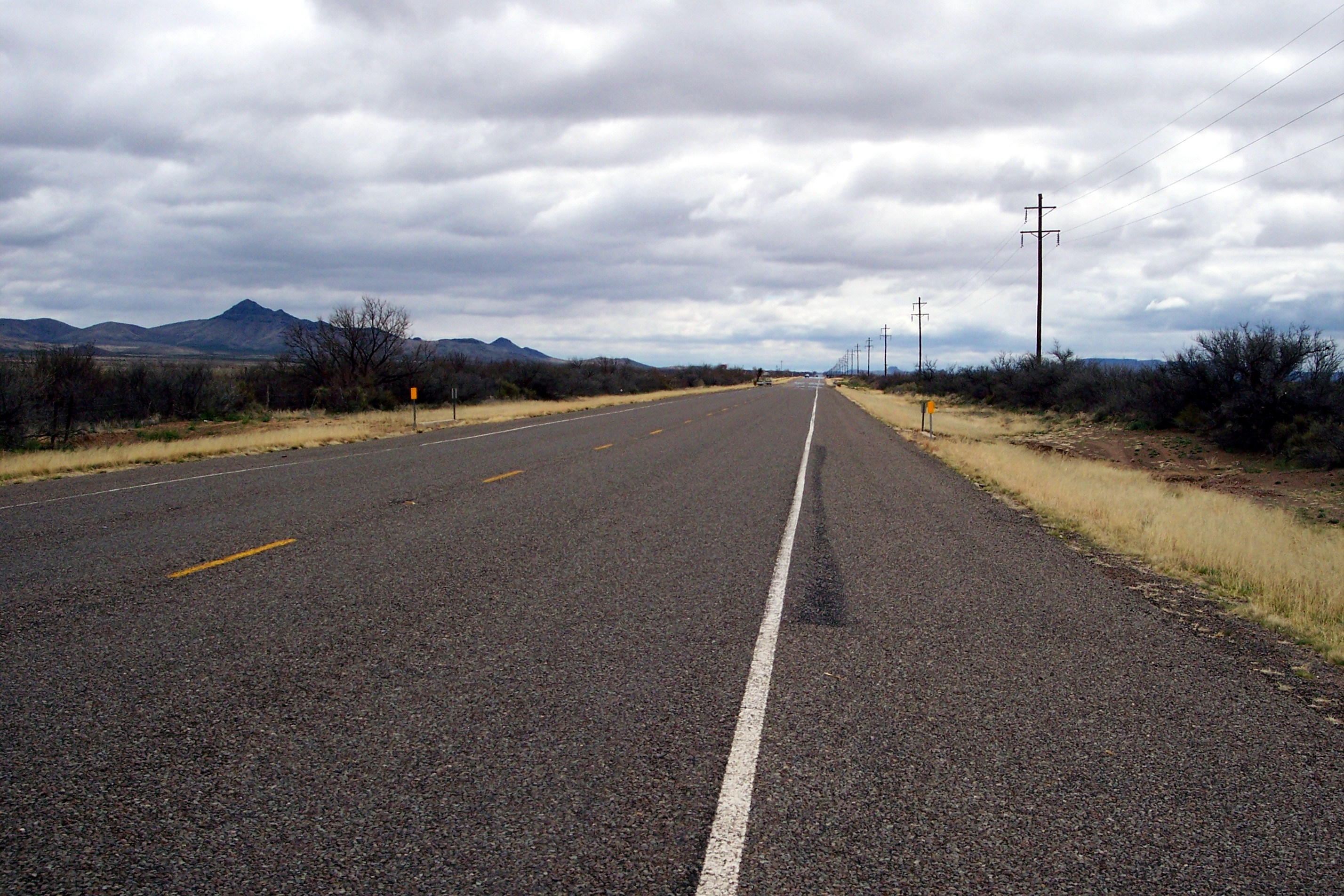
U.S. Highway 90 south of Van Horn

- Interstate 10
  - I-10 BL (Van Horn)
- U.S. Highway 62/U.S. Highway 180
- U.S. Highway 90
- State Highway 54

=== Adjacent counties ===
- Eddy County, New Mexico (north)
- Reeves County (east)
- Jeff Davis County (south)
- Hudspeth County (west)
- Otero County, New Mexico (northwest)

=== National protected areas ===
- Guadalupe Mountains National Park
  - Guadalupe Peak
  - El Capitan
  - McKittrick Canyon

== Demographics ==
Historical population
Census	Pop.	Note	%±
1920	912		—
1930	1,228		34.6%
1940	1,653		34.6%
1950	1,825		10.4%
1960	2,794		53.1%
1970	3,429		22.7%
1980	3,315		−3.3%
1990	3,407		2.8%
2000	2,975		−12.7%
2010	2,398		−19.4%
2020	2,188		−8.8%
2025 (est.)	2,267	▲	3.6%
U.S. Decennial Census; 1850–2010 2010–2020

=== Racial and ethnic composition ===
Culberson County, Texas – Racial and ethnic composition Note: the US Census treats Hispanic/Latino as an ethnic category. This table excludes Latinos from the racial categories and assigns them to a separate category. Hispanics/Latinos may be of any race.
Race / Ethnicity (NH = Non-Hispanic)	Pop 1980	Pop 1990	Pop 2000	Pop 2010	Pop 2020	% 1980	% 1990	% 2000	% 2010	% 2020
White alone (NH)	1,196	950	733	504	445	36.08%	27.88%	24.64%	21.02%	20.34%
Black or African American alone (NH)	0	2	19	8	20	0.00%	0.06%	0.64%	0.33%	0.91%
Native American or Alaska Native alone (NH)	6	11	11	13	11	0.18%	0.32%	0.37%	0.54%	0.50%
Asian alone (NH)	8	25	17	22	28	0.24%	0.73%	0.57%	0.92%	1.28%
Native Hawaiian or Pacific Islander alone (NH)	x	x	0	0	0	x	x	0.00%	0.00%	0.00%
Other race alone (NH)	4	0	0	0	3	0.12%	0.00%	0.00%	0.00%	0.14%
Mixed race or Multiracial (NH)	x	x	46	24	36	x	x	1.55%	1.00%	1.65%
Hispanic or Latino (any race)	2,101	2,419	2,149	1,827	1,645	63.38%	71.00%	72.24%	76.19%	75.18%
Total	3,315	3,407	2,975	2,398	2,188	100.00%	100.00%	100.00%	100.00%	100.00%

=== 2020 census ===
As of the 2020 census, the county had a population of 2,188. The median age was 40.6 years. 21.3% of residents were under the age of 18 and 19.0% of residents were 65 years of age or older. For every 100 females there were 105.6 males, and for every 100 females age 18 and over there were 106.4 males age 18 and over.

The racial makeup of the county was 46.3% White, 1.0% Black or African American, 1.1% American Indian and Alaska Native, 1.3% Asian, <0.1% Native Hawaiian and Pacific Islander, 23.3% from some other race, and 27.0% from two or more races. Hispanic or Latino residents of any race comprised 75.2% of the population.

<0.1% of residents lived in urban areas, while 100.0% lived in rural areas.

There were 881 households in the county, of which 34.1% had children under the age of 18 living in them. Of all households, 40.6% were married-couple households, 24.4% were households with a male householder and no spouse or partner present, and 28.6% were households with a female householder and no spouse or partner present. About 29.4% of all households were made up of individuals and 14.8% had someone living alone who was 65 years of age or older.

There were 1,070 housing units, of which 17.7% were vacant. Among occupied housing units, 67.0% were owner-occupied and 33.0% were renter-occupied. The homeowner vacancy rate was 2.1% and the rental vacancy rate was 8.6%.

=== 2000 census ===
As of the census of 2000, 2,975 people, 1,052 households, and 797 families resided in the county. The population density was less than 1/km^{2} (2.6/mi^{2}). The 1,321 housing units were at a density less than one per square mile (0/km^{2}). The racial makeup of the county was 68.94% White, 0.71% African American, 0.47% Native American, 0.57% Asian, 27.13% from other races, and 2.18% from two or more races. About 72.24% of the population were Hispanic or Latino of any race.

Of the 1,052 households, 39.10% had children under the age of 18 living with them, 58.20% were married couples living together, 13.50% had a female householder with no husband present, and 24.20% were not families. About 21.50% of all households were made up of individuals, and 7.40% had someone living alone who was 65 years of age or older. The average household size was 2.82 and the average family size was 3.30.

In the county, the population was distributed as 32.20% under the age of 18, 7.80% from 18 to 24, 25.80% from 25 to 44, 23.00% from 45 to 64, and 11.20% who were 65 years of age or older. The median age was 33 years. For every 100 females, there were 102.70 males. For every 100 females age 18 and over, there were 97.10 males.

The median income for a household in the county was $25,882, and for a family was $28,547. Males had a median income of $22,500 versus $14,817 for females. The per capita income for the county was $11,493. About 21.50% of families and 25.10% of the population were below the poverty line, including 30.20% of those under age 18 and 19.40% of those age 65 or over.

== Communities ==
=== Town ===
- Van Horn (county seat)

=== Unincorporated communities ===
- Astronaut Village
- Kent
- Nickel Creek
- Pine Springs
- Plateau
- State Line
- Wild Horse

=== Ghost towns ===
- Boracho
- Corner Windmill
- Levinson
- Lobo
- Old Christian Place
- Ort

== Education ==
All of the county is in the Culberson County-Allamoore Independent School District.

All of the county is in the service area of Odessa College.

== Politics ==
Like most counties in heavily Hispanic South Texas, Culberson County leaned Democratic. However, Republican Donald Trump won the county by nearly 17 points in 2024. Prior to 2024, the last Republican presidential candidate to carry the county was George W. Bush in 2004, who drew even with Kerry among Hispanic voters in the state. Democratic strength has declined in the county in recent years, with Joe Biden barely receiving over 50% of the vote in 2020.

United States presidential election results for Culberson County, Texas
Year	Republican		Democratic		Third party(ies)	
Year	No.	%	No.	%	No.	%
1912	0	0.00%	145	100.00%	0	0.00%
1916	2	1.57%	124	97.64%	1	0.79%
1920	6	12.77%	40	85.11%	1	2.13%
1924	15	12.82%	93	79.49%	9	7.69%
1928	72	45.86%	85	54.14%	0	0.00%
1932	18	5.92%	285	93.75%	1	0.33%
1936	23	8.78%	239	91.22%	0	0.00%
1940	45	12.89%	303	86.82%	1	0.29%
1944	17	6.77%	200	79.68%	34	13.55%
1948	38	12.42%	244	79.74%	24	7.84%
1952	331	56.78%	252	43.22%	0	0.00%
1956	324	54.36%	269	45.13%	3	0.50%
1960	300	46.15%	343	52.77%	7	1.08%
1964	314	39.90%	473	60.10%	0	0.00%
1968	298	38.55%	330	42.69%	145	18.76%
1972	555	69.12%	238	29.64%	10	1.25%
1976	373	47.40%	407	51.72%	7	0.89%
1980	541	55.43%	423	43.34%	12	1.23%
1984	509	55.51%	407	44.38%	1	0.11%
1988	417	42.46%	557	56.72%	8	0.81%
1992	251	29.63%	424	50.06%	172	20.31%
1996	329	26.51%	804	64.79%	108	8.70%
2000	413	40.81%	577	57.02%	22	2.17%
2004	407	51.65%	375	47.59%	6	0.76%
2008	257	33.86%	492	64.82%	10	1.32%
2012	295	33.56%	568	64.62%	16	1.82%
2016	280	36.51%	454	59.19%	33	4.30%
2020	415	48.03%	438	50.69%	11	1.27%
2024	451	57.75%	319	40.85%	11	1.41%

United States Senate election results for Culberson County, Texas1
Year	Republican		Democratic		Third party(ies)	
Year	No.	%	No.	%	No.	%
2024	394	52.89%	340	45.64%	11	1.48%

United States Senate election results for Culberson County, Texas2
Year	Republican		Democratic		Third party(ies)	
Year	No.	%	No.	%	No.	%
2020	367	47.23%	385	49.55%	25	3.22%

Texas Gubernatorial election results for Crosby County
Year	Republican		Democratic		Third party(ies)	
Year	No.	%	No.	%	No.	%
2022	391	53.20%	328	44.63%	16	2.18%

== See also ==
- List of museums in West Texas
- National Register of Historic Places listings in Culberson County, Texas
- Recorded Texas Historic Landmarks in Culberson County
- Beach Mountains
