= El Capitan (Texas) =

Mountain in the US state of Texas

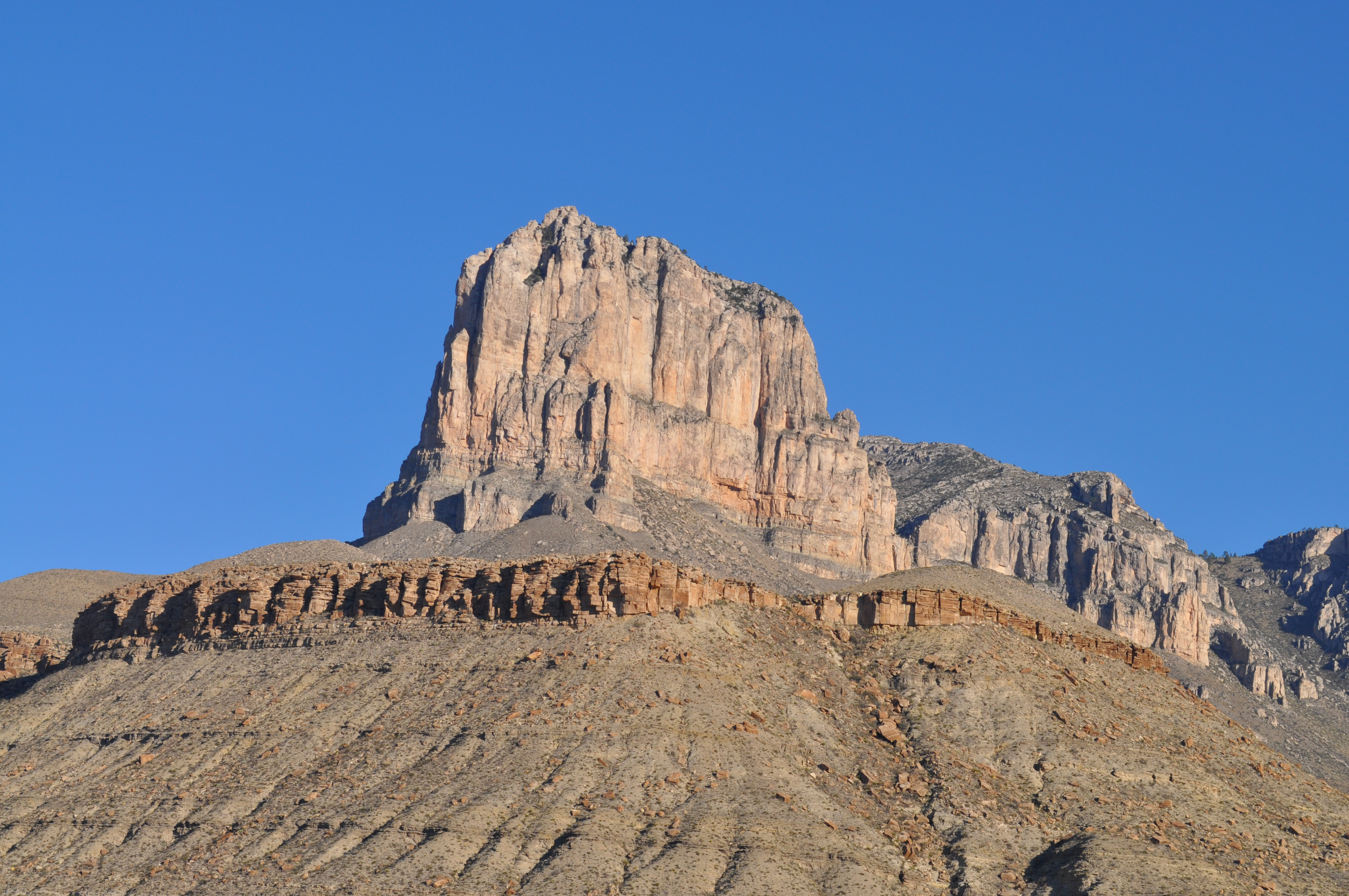
- View from U.S. Highway 62/180

Highest point
- Elevation: 8,064 ft (2,458 m)
- Prominence: 285 ft (87 m)
- Parent peak: Guadalupe Peak
- Coordinates: 31°52′38″N 104°51′29″W

Geography
- Location within Texas
- Location: Culberson County, Texas, U.S.
- Parent range: Guadalupe Mountains
- Topo map: Guadalupe Peak

Geology
- Rock age: Permian

Climbing
- Easiest route: Hike

El Capitan (Spanish: El Capitán) is a peak in Culberson County, Texas, located within Guadalupe Mountains National Park. The 7th-highest peak in Texas at 8,085 ft (2,464 m), El Capitan is part of the Guadalupe Mountains, an exposed portion of a Permian period reef uplifted and exposed by tectonic activity during the late Cretaceous period. The southern terminus of the Guadalupe Mountains, El Capitan looms over U.S. 62/180, where its imposing height and stark outline have made it one of the iconic images of the Trans-Pecos to generations of travelers.

== Geology ==
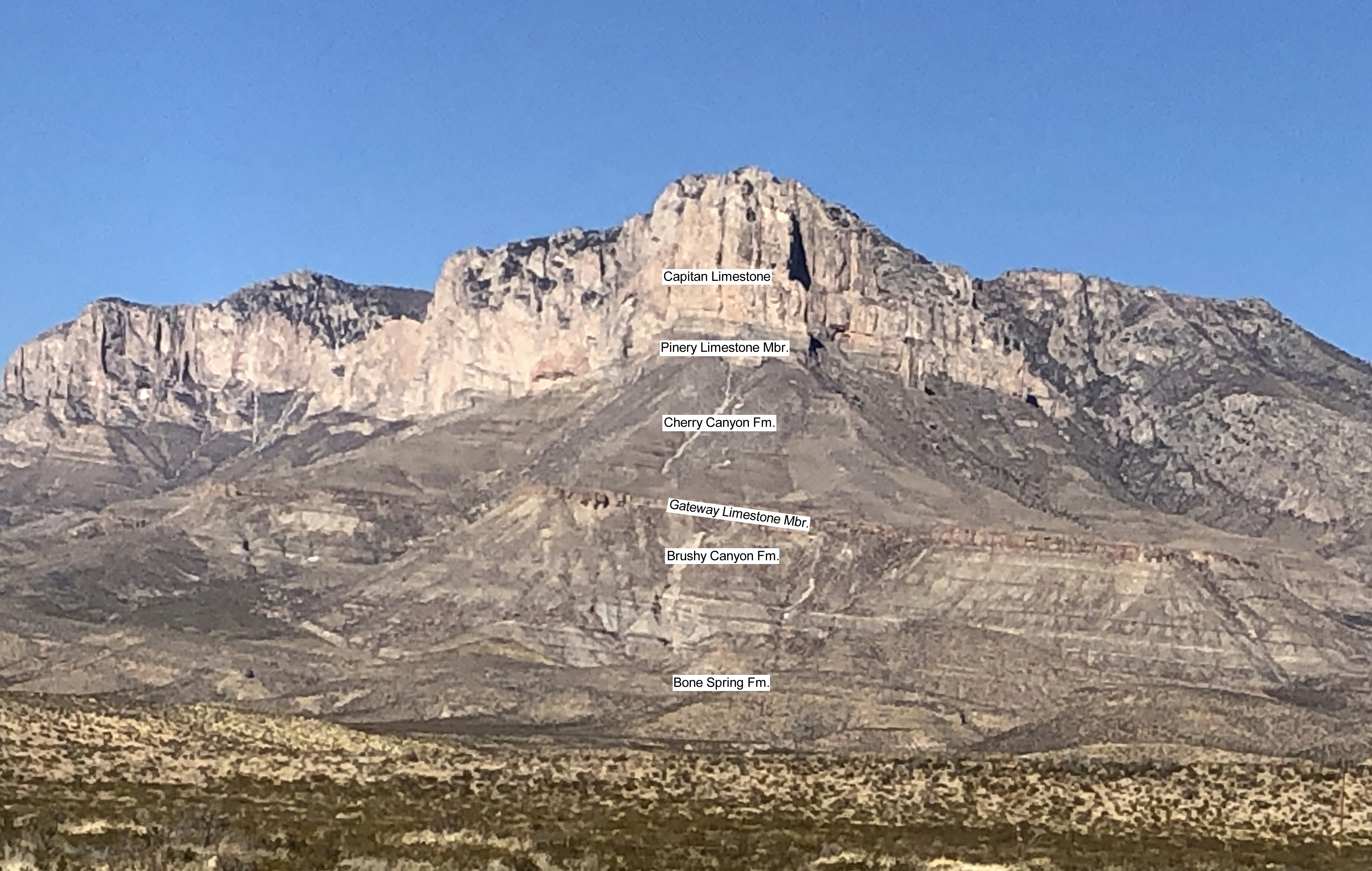
Labeled strata making El Capitan

El Capitan is the southernmost peak of the Guadalupe escarpment, an ancient limestone reef that forms the present-day Guadalupe Mountains. These mountains are an exposed portion of the Capitan Reef Barrier, a 350-mile long reef constructed primarily from calcareous sponges, encrusting algae, such as stromatolites, and lime-rich mud directly from the ocean. This reef surrounded much of the Delaware Sea, an inland ocean that covered parts of modern southern New Mexico and Trans-Pecos Texas in the Permian period (about 290 million years ago). Near the end of the late Permian period, in the Ochoan epoch, the outlet that allowed sea water to enter the inland waters began to silt over, occasionally closing the inland sea from its source. Mineral-rich and cut off from replenishment, the inland sea began to evaporate into layers of alternating gray anhydrite/gypsum, brown calcite, and halite, which formed the Castile Formation. As salt concentrations increased, laminated halite, anhydrite, sylvite, and polyhalite formed the Salado Formation, which eventually covered and grew beyond the lower Castile Formation.

By the end of the Ochoan, these deposits had filled the roughly 1,800-ft-deep basin and covered the reef with dry land. Red silt and sand deposited by rivers crossing these new lands eventually formed the dolomitic Rustler Formation, and the Dewey Lake Formation, burying the reef even deeper. The Capitan Reef stayed buried for over 150 million years, until the late Cretaceous period of the Mesozoic era (80 million years ago), when tectonic activity associated with the Laramide Orogeny caused a significant uplift in the area and created a major fault line, the Border Fault, in the area west of the Delaware Basin. Exposing the Guadalupe Mountains area of the reef, the impact of this tectonic event can be clearly seen in the difference in height between the towering El Capitan and the adjacent salt flat graben, vertically driven 1,000 feet apart by the uplift. Once exposed, the natural forces of wind and rain slowly stripped away the softer sediments, further uncovering the ancient reef and revealing the sheer limestone walls of the Guadalupe Mountains.

== Human history ==
Deep in the Chihuahuan Desert, the area around El Capitan is composed of rugged mountains and wind-swept salt flats. As a result, most of the Native American presence in the vicinity was centered around 3 miles southeast of El Capitan in the area now called Pine Springs. An oasis of springs, seeps, and vegetation, this area exhibits evidence (mescal dumps, petroglyphs, artifacts, etc.) of human occupation for several centuries. Most recently, the area was a seasonal home to bands of the Mescalero Apache, who, steadily pushed south by the fiercely expansionist Comanche in the 18th century, used their local knowledge of springs and other scarce resources to maintain themselves in an otherwise harsh environment well into the 19th century, when Anglo expansion and settlement ended their delicately balanced way of life.

While the occasional Spanish expedition, such as that of Antonio de Espejo in 1582, came close to the area around El Capitan, permanent Anglo-European presence in the area dates from the late 1840s, when the region officially became a part of the United States after the American victory in the Mexican–American War. Eager to find a suitable trail from San Antonio to El Paso, and eventually the far-flung American territories on the Pacific coast, a number of expeditions pushed into the hot, dry, dangerous lands west of the Pecos, hoping to find a potential wagon route with enough timber and water to make consistent travel possible. One of the expeditions, led by Indian Agent Robert S. Neighbors, made its way to El Paso in 1849 through a difficult journey that required crossing and recrossing the Pecos and Devil's Rivers, and then surviving the long, dry stretch from the Davis Mountains to El Paso. Dismayed at the prospect of returning by the same route, the party instead struck off east from El Paso towards the Hueco Tanks and Guadalupe Pass, which they hoped to follow to an established crossing of the Pecos River near the modern Texas-New Mexico border long used by Mexicans and Native Americans. Successful in reaching the Pecos, Neighbors quickly descended the river and made his way back to San Antonio, where he reported to his superiors that this route offered good water at Hueco Tanks, good timber near the mountains, and an easy path through Guadalupe Pass to the Pecos. This road, which became known as the "upper" road, to distinguish itself from the original "lower" road through Fort Davis and up the Rio Grande to El Paso, soon became popular among traders and emigrants, their long trains of wagons and mules passing near the brooding face of El Capitan. This traffic increased in 1858 as the Butterfield Stagecoach began to use the upper road between El Paso and the ford on the Pecos called Pope’s Crossing, after John Pope, the Army officer who had surveyed the crossing two years before. Taking advantage of the water and timber available, the stagecoach line constructed a station at the Pinery, later called Pine Springs, 3 miles southeast of El Capitan. Though this station only lasted a year before the route was moved south to come under the protection of Forts Stockton and Davis, the Pinery station continued to be used by soldiers, freighters, and emigrants long after.

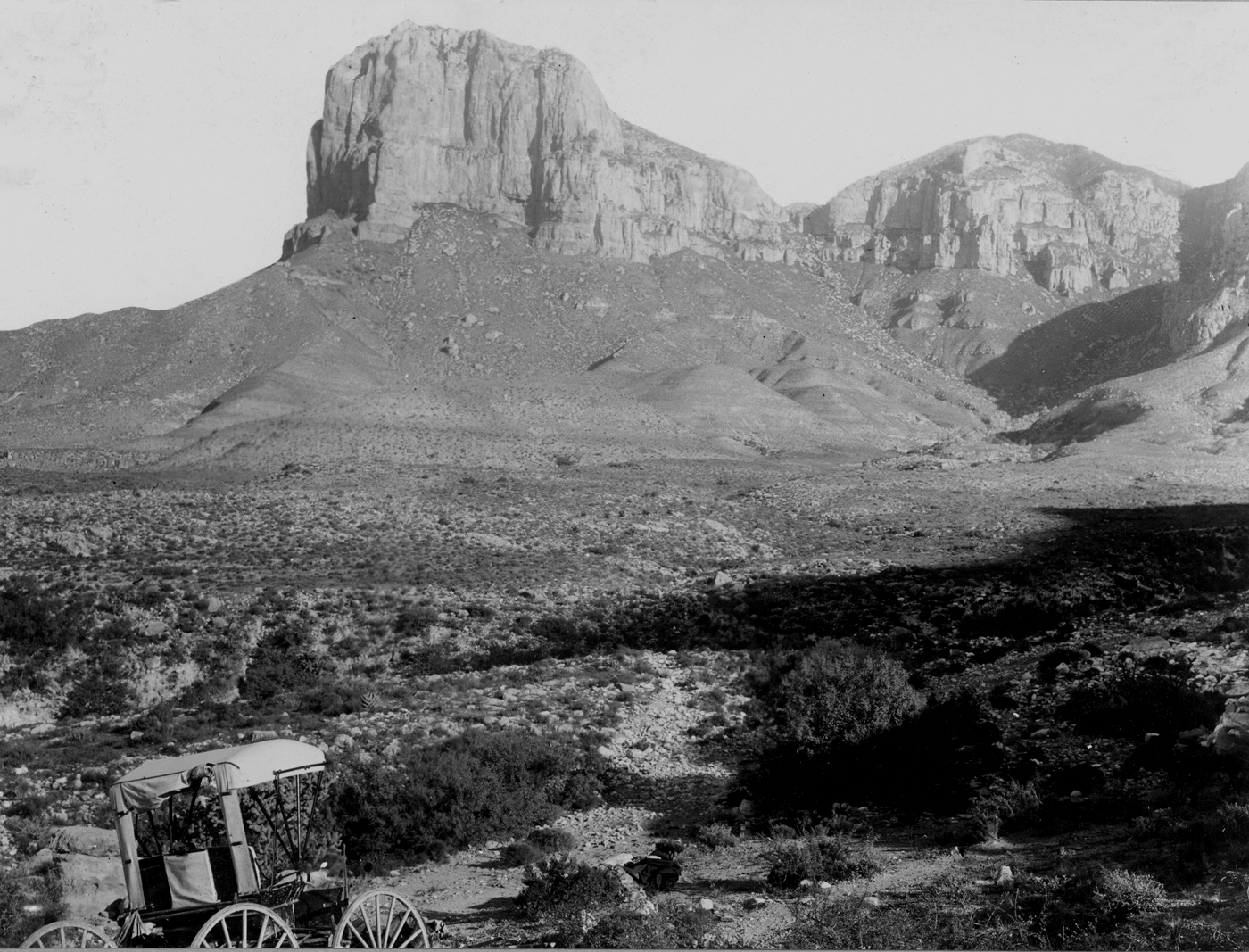
El Capitan in 1899

During this period, El Capitan also bore witness to the El Paso Salt War, a violent struggle between Mexican-American residents and Anglo businessmen over access to the salt flats extending west from the base of the mountain. Long known to the Apache, the salt flats were first identified by Europeans in 1692 by the expedition of Diego de Vargas. Quickly becoming an important local resource, generations of Mexicans, and later, Mexican-Americans, braved the hot, dangerous, four-day trail from San Elizario on the Rio Grande to the Hueco Mountains and then east towards El Capitan to fill their wagons with the precious salt. This all changed in the late 1840s, when the region began to have a larger Anglo presence. While Mexican law and tradition had held the salt flats as communal property, American tradition considered them unclaimed lands, which could be claimed by any citizen and purchased as private property. By the 1870s, attempts by local businessmen to claim the salt flats were being met with violent opposition by local residents, for whom the free salt was an important adjunct to the regional economy of farming and ranching. The conflict came to a head in December 1877, when Charles Howard, who had attempted to claim the salt flats, and two colleagues were murdered by an angry mob. This quickly led to widespread violence against local Mexican-American families, leading many to flee south of the Rio Grande. By the time the dust had settled, the salt flats had been claimed and local residents were forced to pay for the salt that for centuries had been free.

By the early decades of the 20th century, an all-weather road had been constructed between El Paso and Carlsbad, New Mexico. Commissioned in 1928 as U.S. Highway 62, the road brought a new generation of visitors to the area, particularly after the opening of nearby Carlsbad Caverns National Park in 1930. Decades before the creation of Guadalupe Mountains National Park, travelers by car and bus were already stopping at roadside rest stops to marvel at the sheer sides of El Capitan, take pictures, and write quick messages on the backs of postcards emblazoned with the mountain’s imposing face. During this period, the land that included El Capitan was owned by James Adolphus Williams, whose Williams Ranch house is still extant on park land west of the mountain. After several economic setbacks, Williams sold the land in 1941 to Judge J.C. Hunter of Van Horn, Texas, a prosperous oilman and early conservationist whose Guadalupe Mountains Ranch eventually included 75,000 acres of land in the Guadalupes, including parts of McKittrick Canyon. An early advocate for establishing a park to protect the southern Guadalupes, Hunter campaigned for several years until his death in 1945. Inheriting his father’s desire to see the area protected, both for its scenic beauty and geological significance, Hunter's son, J.C. Hunter Jr., worked with officials of the National Park Service to construct a deal that would enable the Park Service to purchase the land for use as a national park. Forced to run a tortuous gauntlet of state and federal legislators, park officials, and road engineers, as well as property owners and local ranchers, the Hunter donation, which included El Capitan and Guadalupe Peak, was finally deeded over to the Park Service in 1969. Three years later, Guadalupe Mountains National Park was officially opened, allowing public access to the area.

== Access ==
As previously noted, El Capitan is located within the boundaries of Guadalupe Mountains National Park, a fee-area located on U.S. Highway 62/180 between Carlsbad and El Paso. The southern terminus of the Guadalupe range, El Capitan is guarded by cliffs on three sides, and those faces are rarely climbed due to the unstable condition of the rock and the sheer nature of the peak. While no trail to the summit has been developed, hikers can climb up to the top of El Capitan by first climbing to near the summit of Guadalupe Peak on the developed 4.5-mile Guadalupe Peak Trail, scrambling down to the south onto the Guadalupe Peak-El Capitan saddle, and then hiking up the back of El Capitan to the summit.
