= Lobo, Texas =

Ghost town in Culberson County, Texas, United States

- Ghost town
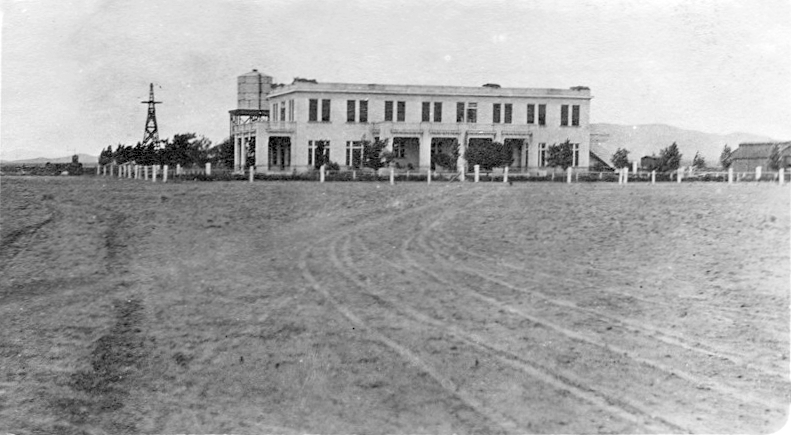
- Hotel in Lobo, c. 1910s

- Location within Texas
- Coordinates: 30°48′51″N 104°45′11″W
- Country: United States
- State: Texas
- County: Culberson
- Elevation: 4,009 ft (1,222 m)

Population (2009)
  - Total: 15
- Time zone: UTC-6 (Central (CST))
  - Summer (DST): UTC-5 (CDT)
- ZIP code: 77591
- Area code: 432

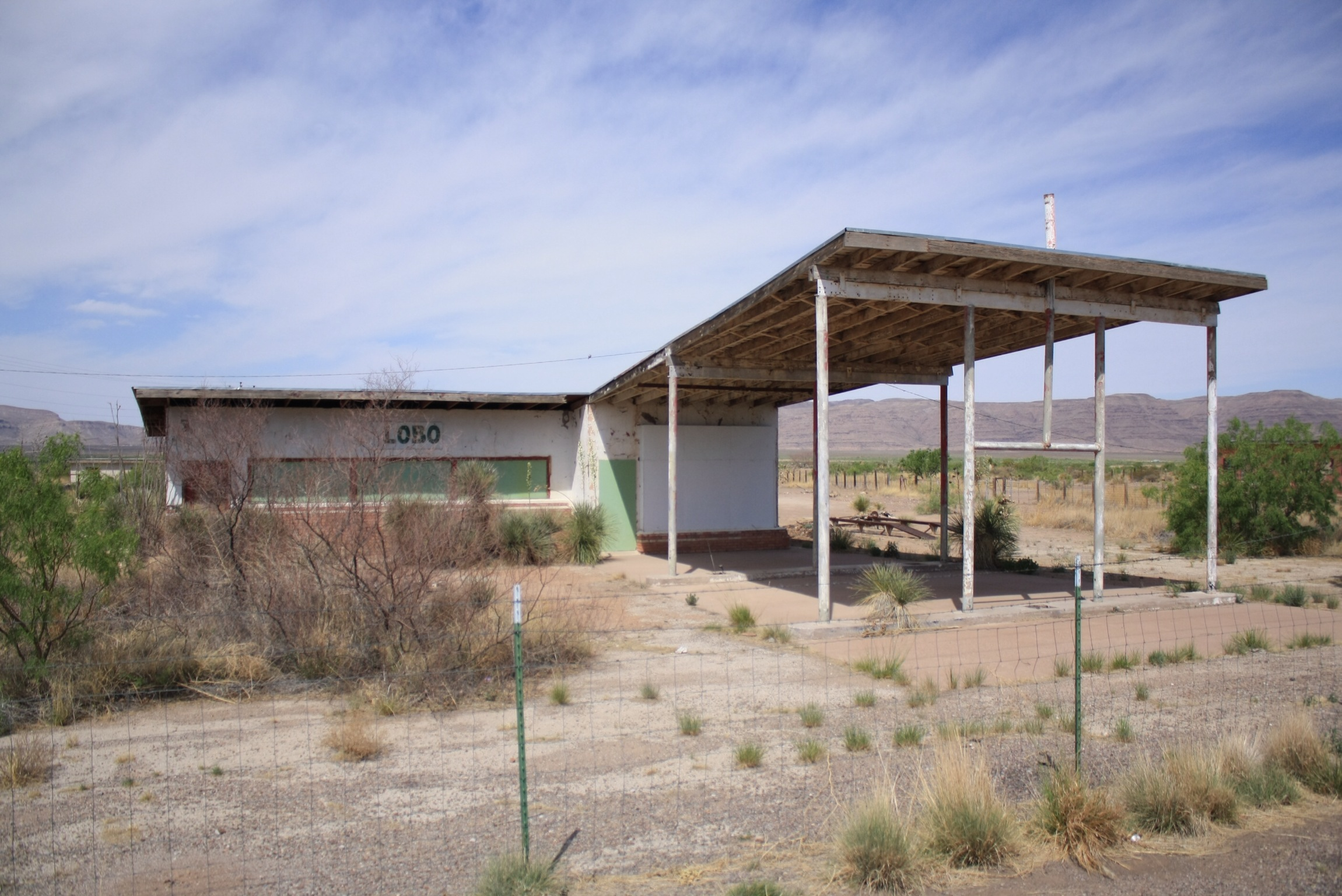
Lobo, 2013

Lobo is a ghost town in Culberson County, Texas, United States, that was abandoned in 1991.

== Geography ==
Lobo is located in the Trans-Pecos region of West Texas, between the Van Horn Mountains and Wylie Mountains in southern Culberson County. It is situated along U.S. Highway 90, approximately 12 miles (19 km) south of Van Horn and 24 miles (39 km) west of Valentine.

== History ==
The community's history dates back to the mid-19th century, when a bolson aquifer named Van Horn Wells was discovered in the area. These wells were the only known water sources within a radius of 100 miles (160 km). The springs became a stop on the San Antonio-El Paso Road, followed by emigrants travelling to the West. It was followed by the San Antonio-San Diego Mail Line and Butterfield Overland Mail and other mail routes from 1857 until the railroads arrived.

In 1882, the area became a watering stop and depot for the Southern Pacific Railroad. A post office was established in 1907 under the name Lobo, after the Mexican wolves (Canis lupus baileyi) that formerly roamed the area. Two years later, a town site was laid out. With the creation of Culberson County in 1911, Lobo vied unsuccessfully with nearby Van Horn to become the new county's seat of government. By 1915, the community had a population around 20 with a general store and several other businesses. A 1929 earthquake destroyed Lobo's hotel. Another powerful earthquake struck the community in 1931. By the mid-1930s, the number of inhabitants had fallen to 10. The post office closed in 1942, but the arrival of the Texas Mica Company and two railroad houses caused a slight increase in the population. Large-scale irrigation commenced in the late 1940s and in the following years, cotton became an important crop in the local economy. Anderson, Clayton and Company set up a gin in Lobo, but in 1962, the railroad stop shut down. The population approached 90 by the mid-1960s. Around that time, the water table dropped dramatically and the wells were unable to supply enough water for residents and businesses. The cost of keeping the irrigation pumps operational skyrocketed, and the cotton gin shut down.

In 1969, Bill Christ bought the entire community and opened a new gas station and a general store. Although business was initially good, the sale of alcoholic beverages caused an increase in crime. The store was destroyed by fire in 1976. In 1988, Christ placed the community on the market for $60,000. By 1991, with no purchaser and faced with personal problems, Christ abandoned his effort to save Lobo. It became a modern ghost town with limited water and an annual rainfall around 13.2 inches (340 mm) per year. On November 5, 2001, three residents from Frankfurt, Germany, purchased Lobo. Their plans included fixing up dilapidated buildings and holding local arts and music festivals.

The Desert Dust Cinema festival was held in Lobo in 2011, 2012, 2016, and September 2018, but no future dates are planned.

Today, there is an irrigated pecan orchard (with more than 61,000 trees) and the South Lobo campground, both located within a mile of the old townsite of Lobo.

The German owners of Lobo were offering the town for sale for $100,000 in 2023.

== See also ==
- List of ghost towns in Texas
- Beach Mountains
- Davis Mountains
- Trans-Pecos
