= Pine Springs, Texas =

- Unincorporated community
- Nickname: "Gateway to the Peak"
- Location of Pine Springs in Texas Location of Pine Springs in the USA
- Country: United States
- State: Texas
- County: Culberson
- Elevation: 5,633 ft (1,717 m)

Population (2000)
  - Total: 51
- Time zone: UTC-7 (Mountain (MST))
  - Summer (DST): UTC-6 (MDT)
- GNIS feature ID: 1380360

Pine Springs is an unincorporated community in northern Culberson County, Texas, United States. According to the Handbook of Texas, the community had a population of 20 in 2000.

== History ==
19th-century visitors who crossed Guadalupe Pass were aware of the location; among them were Lt. Francis Theodore Bryan, Capt. Randolph B. Marcy, John Russell Bartlett, and Capt. John Pope in 1849, who camped there. At this location, the Butterfield Overland Mail constructed the Pinery, a stage station, in 1858. Only a palisade corral had been constructed when the first westbound mail arrived on September 28, 1858, and station keeper Henry Ramstein and his helpers were still living in tents. November 1858 saw the completion of the Pinery, but it was abandoned in August 1859 when the mail route was moved to the south to benefit from the defenses provided by forts Stockton and Davis.

The site was the meeting point for troops under Major Albert Morrow from Fort Quitman and reinforcements from Forts Stockton and Davis in 1870, in preparation for reconnaissance missions against the Mescalero Apaches in the Guadalupes. The soldiers advanced into McKittrick Canyon and quickly got disoriented, though they did manage to come across a Mescalero community, which they pillaged with great zeal. Soldiers, freighters, and other vagrants continued to use the Pinery as a sanctuary in the mid-1880s, long after the Mescaleros had been declared no longer a danger. Rancher Walter Glover had moved to the area in 1907 after purchasing the land where the Pinery now stood. He brought his wife, Bertha, to Pine Springs ten years later.

In 1914, the Van Horn Valley Land and Railway built a line from Van Horn north to the New Mexico state line around Pine Springs.

The Pine Springs Cafe was constructed in 1928 in response to the opening of U.S. Highway 62. It quickly became a popular rest stop for drivers between El Paso and Carlsbad, New Mexico, and Bertha Glover operated it until her death in 1982. When a post office opened in 1942, Pine Springs' population was reported to be 50 and she was appointed postmistress; the post office closed the following year. By the mid-1940s, three enterprises were operating for an estimated population of 70. However, by the mid-1960s, that number had dropped to 10.

The estimated population increased to 20 after Guadalupe Mountains National Park was established and opened to the public in 1972. The majority of the residents were employed by the park or the state transportation agency. The community's population of 20 was still listed in 1990. The population of 20 persisted in 2000.

On May 12, 1986, a Bell 206B helicopter crashed while returning with food for a station crew that was making reports from a remote area. It was caused by improper maintenance resulting in the main drive shaft uncoupling. Two people died.

Pine Springs declares itself to be Texas' windiest town: winds that average between fifty and eighty miles per hour, with occasional gusts up to 105 miles per hour, batter the town every year between February and April.

== Geography ==
Pine Springs is located at the crossroads of U.S. Routes 62 and 180, 60 mi (97 km) north of Van Horn and 3 mi (4.8 km) southeast of Guadalupe Peak in northwestern Culberson County.

=== Climate ===
According to the Köppen climate classification, Pine Springs has a semiarid climate, abbreviated BSk on climate maps.

The city of Livingston, Montana, is the second windiest place in the U.S. after Pine Springs. During the March 2019 North American blizzard, wind gusts of 103 mph (166 km/h) were recorded in Pine Springs.

== Education ==
Today, the community is served by the Culberson County-Allamoore Independent School District.
