= State Line, Texas =

- Unincorporated community
- Location within Texas Location within the United States
- Coordinates: 31°59′53″N 104°32′5″W
- Country: United States
- State: Texas
- County: Culberson
- Elevation: 3,944 ft (1,202 m)
- Time zone: UTC-7 (Mountain (MST))
  - Summer (DST): UTC-6 (MDT)
- Area code: 432
- GNIS feature ID: 2034720

State Line is an unincorporated community in Culberson County, Texas, United States. According to the Handbook of Texas, the community had a population of 18 in 2000.

== History ==
State Line had a population of 18 in 2000.

== Education ==
Today, the community is served by the Culberson County-Allamoore Independent School District.
