= Wild Horse, Texas =

Wild Horse
- Unincorporated community
- Location within Texas
- Coordinates: 31.052938°N 104.678787°W
- Country: USA
- State: Texas
- County: Culberson

Wild Horse is an unincorporated community in Culberson County, Texas, United States.

== Location ==
Wild Horse is approximately 9 miles (14 km) due east of the center of Van Horn, Texas, just off Interstate 10.
