= Guadalupe Pass (Texas) =

American mountain pass

Coordinates: 31°51′39″N 104°49′18″W

- Interactive map of Guadalupe Pass
- Elevation: 5,424 ft (1,653 m)
- Traversed by: US 62, US 180

Third Approach
- Location: Culberson County, Texas, United States
- Range: Guadalupe Mountains

Guadalupe Pass is a mountain pass in Culberson County, Texas. It is located just outside of Guadalupe Mountains National Park, Texas and is traversed by U.S. Highway 62-180 connecting El Paso, Texas with Carlsbad, New Mexico.
