= Beach Mountains =

Mountain range in Texas, United States

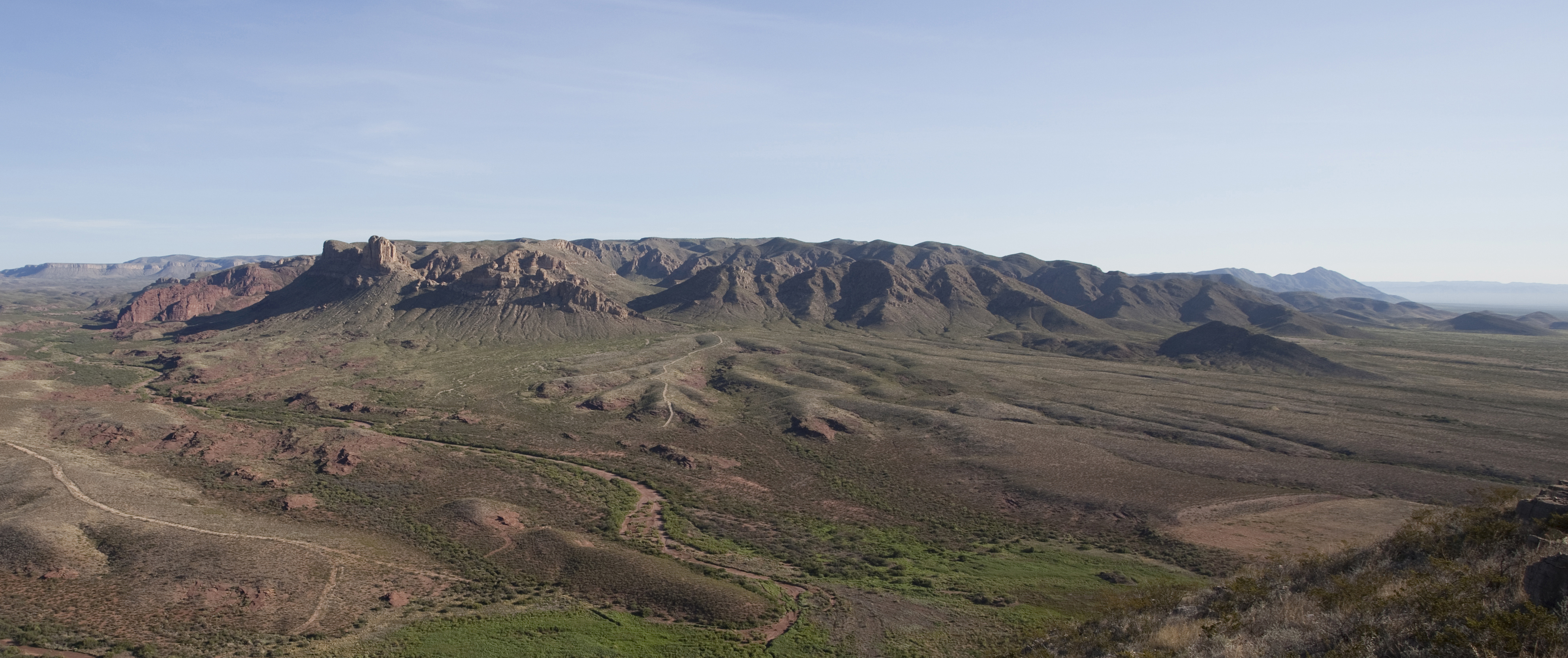
- View of the Beach Mountains from the south

Highest point
- Elevation: 5,827 ft (1,776 m)
- Prominence: 1,725 ft (526 m)
- Coordinates: 31°08′09″N 104°51′31″W

Geography
- Location within Texas
- Location: Culberson County, Texas, U.S.

The Beach Mountains are located on privately owned land roughly 3 miles (5 km) north of Van Horn in southwestern Culberson County, Texas. The maximum elevation reached is 5,827 feet (1,776 m) above sea level. The Beach Mountains occupy a roughly circular area with a diameter of approximately 8 kilometres (5.0 mi), rising 550 metres (1,800 ft) above the surrounding desert. Narrow passes separate the Beach Mountains from the Baylor Mountains to the north and the much larger Sierra Diablo range to the northwest.

== Geology ==
The Beach mountain range is one of multiple isolated mountain ranges that populate Trans-Pecos Texas. Other nearby ranges include the Sierra Diablo, Baylor, Apache, Carrizo, Wylie, Eagle, and Van Horn mountains. Although these isolated ranges may share some common characteristics, their underlying geology can vary significantly.

The Beach Mountains are erosional remnants of Ordovician and Cambrian sedimentary rocks laid down from 541 to 444 million years ago. Along their western margins, a highly intermittent stream called Hackberry Creek has exposed even older Precambrian deposits.

== Flora ==
The vegetation of the Beach Mountains is typical of the Chihuahuan Desert with plants such as Yucca, creosote, mesquite, and various cactus species. The shallow soils along the steep and rocky slopes also support live oak, pinyon pine, juniper, and various grasses.

== Fauna ==
The Beach Mountains are home to rare herds of desert bighorn sheep (Ovis canadensis nelsoni), which tend to be restricted to the mountainous parts of Trans-Pecos Texas and southeastern New Mexico. The many rugged escarpments and the highly dissected and eroded conditions within the Beach Mountains produce a rough and precipitous terrain that is highly favored by mountain sheep. Once extirpated, 38 desert bighorns were reintroduced into the Beach Mountains by the government of Texas in 1991 and 1992. In 2009, the Beach Mountains sheep formed part of a population numbering almost 1,200 in several mountain ranges in western Texas.

== Proper name ==
The mountains are named for J. H. Beach, who settled in the area in the 1880s. Another early settler of Van Horn, Robert K. (Bob) Wylie, gave his name to another nearby mountain range: the Wylie Mountains, located to the southeast of the Beach Mountains.

== See also ==
- Guadalupe Mountains
- Davis Mountains
- Trans-Pecos
- West Texas
- Blue Origin
