= Guadalupe Mountains =

Mountain range in Texas and New Mexico, USA

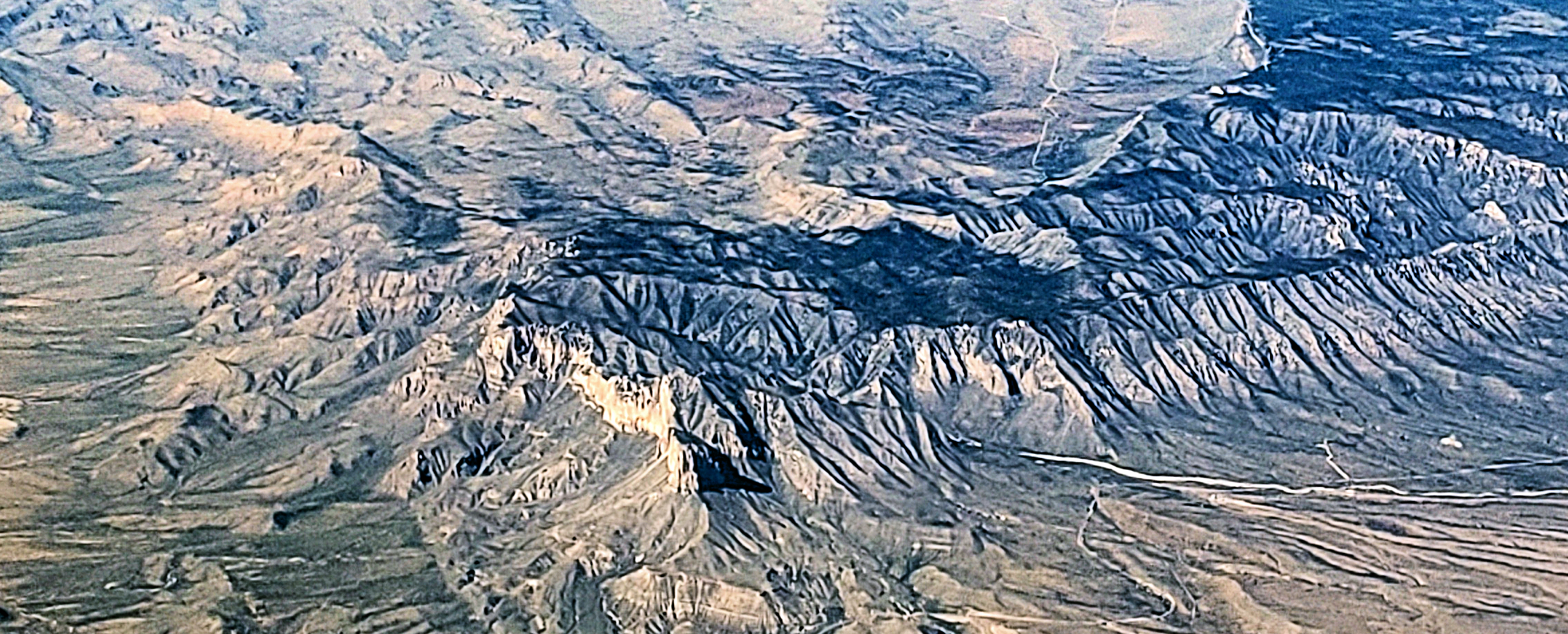
- Guadalupe Mountains

Highest point
- Peak: Guadalupe Peak
- Elevation: 8,751 ft (2,667 m)
- Coordinates: 31°53′28″N 104°51′36″W

Dimensions
- Length: 65 mi (105 km)
- Width: 20 mi (32 km)

Geography
- Location within Texas
- Country: United States
- States: Texas; New Mexico
- Borders on: Sacramento Mountains; Brokeoff Mountains

Geology
- Rock age: Permian
- Rock type: Carbonate sponge reef complex

The Guadalupe Mountains (Spanish: Sierra de Guadalupe) are a mountain range located in West Texas and southeastern New Mexico. The range includes the highest summit in Texas, Guadalupe Peak, 8,751 ft (2,667 m), and the "signature peak" of West Texas, El Capitan, both of which are located within Guadalupe Mountains National Park. The Guadalupe Mountains are bordered by the Pecos River valley and Llano Estacado to the east and north, Delaware Mountains to the south, and Sacramento Mountains to the west. One of the clearest exposures of a prehistoric reef is preserved in the mountain range's bedrock geology. Bedrock contains fossils of reef-dwelling organisms from the Permian period, and the geology is widely studied, mostly by stratigraphers, paleontologists, and Paleoecologists (see geology section).

== History ==
Archaeological evidence has shown that people lived over 10,000 years ago in and among the many caves and alcoves. The first humans to live here were hunter-gatherers who followed large game and collected edible vegetation. Artifacts that support this include projectile points, baskets, pottery, and rock art.

The first Europeans to arrive in the area were the Spaniards in the 16th century, but they did not make serious attempts to settle in the Guadalupe Mountains. The Spanish introduced horses into the area, and nomadic indigenous tribes of the area such as the Apaches soon found horses to be an asset for hunting and migrating. Mescalero Apaches were nomadic and followed the game and harvested the agave (or mescal) for food and fiber. Mescalero is Spanish for mescal-maker. Agave-roasting pits and other artifacts of Mescalero culture can be found in the park.

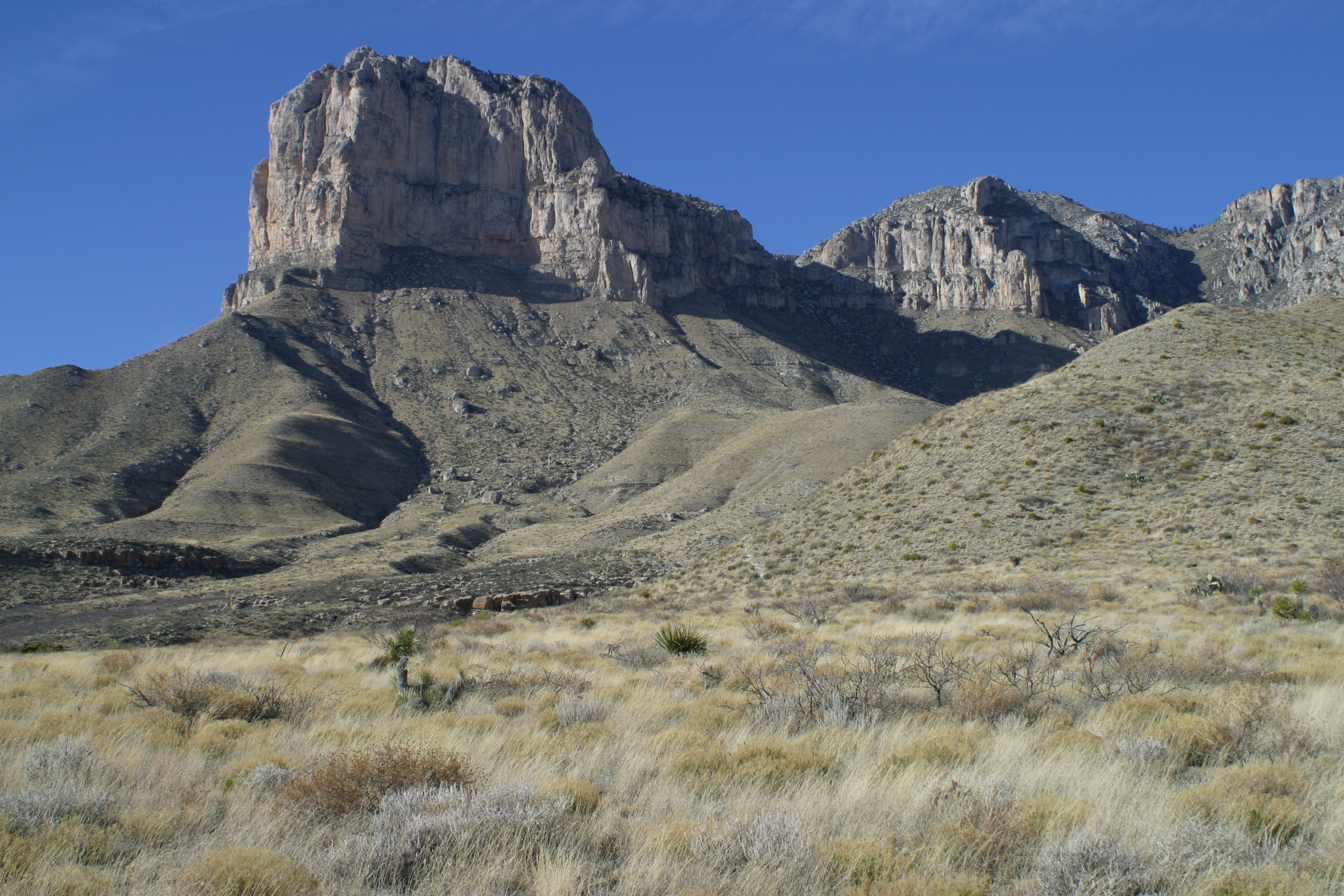
Guadalupe Mountains in 2006

The Mescalero Apaches remained in the mountains through the mid-19th century, but they were challenged by an American transportation route at the end of the American Civil War. During the 1840s and 1850s, many people migrating west crossed the area. In 1858, Pinery station was constructed near Pine Springs for the Butterfield Overland Mail. The Butterfield Overland Mail traveled over Guadalupe Pass located at 5,534 ft (1,687 m) above sea level. A cavalry known as the Buffalo Soldiers was ordered to the area to stop Indian raids on settlements and mail stage routes. During the winter of 1869, Lt. H.B. Cushing led his troops into the Guadalupe Mountains and destroyed two Mescalero Apache camps. The Mescalero Apache were eventually driven out of the area and into US Indian reservations.

Felix McKittrick was one of the first European-descended settlers in the Guadalupe Mountains; he worked cattle during the 1870s. McKittrick Canyon is thought to be named after him. Frijole Ranch was the first permanent ranch house; it was constructed in 1876 by the Rader brothers. Frijole Ranch House was the only major building in the region; it served as a community center and regional post office from 1916 to 1942. Today, the Frijole Ranch House has been restored and operates as a cultural museum. In 1908, Williams Ranch House was built, and it was named after one of its inhabitants, James Adolphus Williams. Judge J.C. Hunter from Van Horn consolidated most of the smaller ranches in the area into the Guadalupe Mountain Ranch. In 1921, Wallace Pratt, a geologist for Humble Oil and Refining Company, was impressed by the beauty of McKittrick Canyon and bought the land to build two homes in the canyon. Both constructions were used as summer homes by Pratt and his family until 1960. Wallace Pratt donated about 6,000 acres (24 km^{2}) of McKittrick Canyon which became part of Guadalupe Mountains National Park. In 1978, the United States Congress designated 46,850 acres (190 km^{2}) of the Texan side of the range as a wilderness area, managed by the National Park Service.

== Geography ==
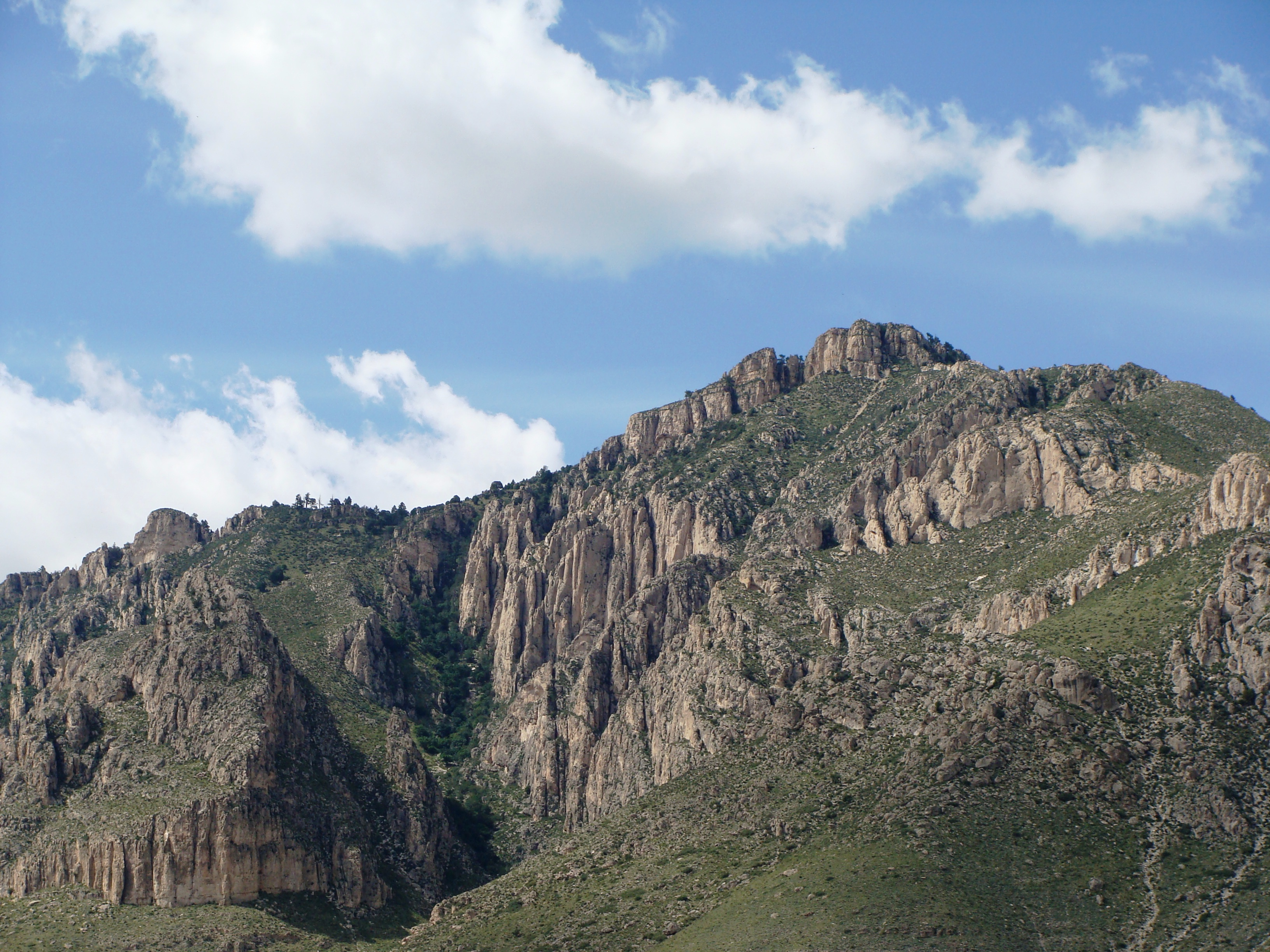
Hunter Peak

The Guadalupe Mountains reach their highest point at Guadalupe Peak, the highest point in Texas, with an elevation of 8,751 feet (2,667 m). The range lies southeast of the Sacramento Mountains and east of the Brokeoff Mountains. The mountain range extends north-northwest and northeast from Guadalupe Peak in Texas into New Mexico. The northeastern extension ends about 10 miles (16 km) southwest of Carlsbad, near White's City and Carlsbad Caverns National Park; the southwest tip ends with El Capitan about 90 miles (140 km) east of El Paso. The mountains rise more than 3,000 feet (910 m) above the arid floor of the Chihuahuan Desert. The Guadalupe Mountains are surrounded by the South Plains to the east and north, Delaware Mountains to the south, and Sacramento Mountains to the west.

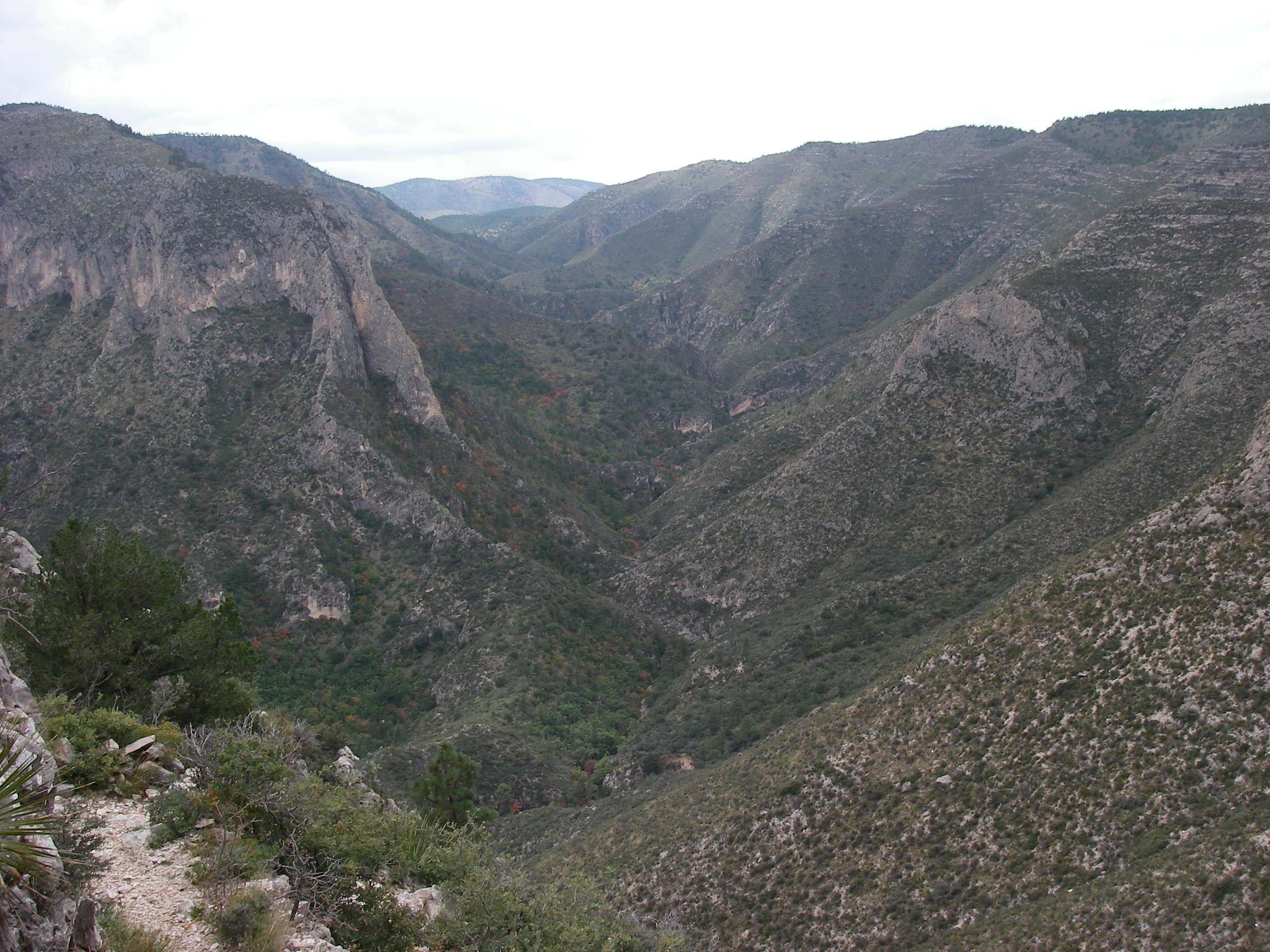
View of McKittrick Canyon from the Guadalupe Mountains

The northwestern extension, bounded by a dramatic escarpment known as "The Rim", extends much further into New Mexico, to near the Sacramento Mountains. The range is bounded on the north by Four Mile Canyon; on the east by the valley of the Pecos River; and on the west by Piñon Creek, Big Dog Canyon, Valley Canyon, Middle Dog Canyon, and West Dog Canyon. Much of the range is built from the ancient Capitán Reef that formed at the margins of a shallow sea during the Permian period. The Guadalupian epoch of the Permian period is named for these mountains, and the Capitanian age within this epoch is named for the Capitan reef. For details on the area's geology, see Delaware Basin. As the range is built up almost entirely of limestone, upland areas have little or no surface water. The only significant surface water is McKittrick Creek, in McKittrick Canyon, which emerges from the eastern side of the massif, just south of the New Mexico border. Elevations at the base of the range vary from 4,000 feet (1,200 m) above sea level on the western side to 5,000 feet (1,500 m) on the east. Several peaks on the southern end exceed 8,000 feet (2,400 m).

The Guadalupe Mountains experience relatively hot summers, calm, mild autumn weather, and cool to cold weather in winter and early spring. Snow storms, freezing rain, or fog may occur in winter or early spring. Frequent high-wind warnings are issued during winter through spring. Late summer monsoons produce thunderstorms. The nights are cool, even in summer.

== Geology ==
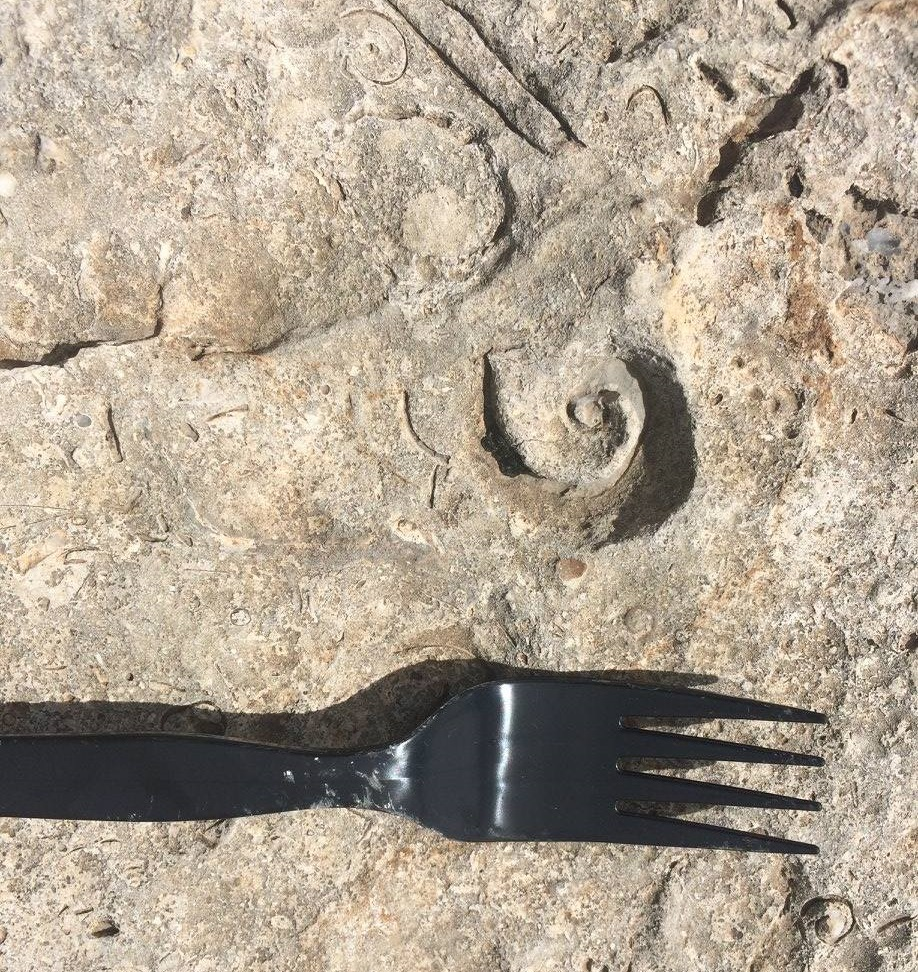
Gastropod fossil along Permian Reef trail (McKittrick Canyon, TX)

The Guadalupe Mountains are underlain by Permian aged sedimentary rocks. Although the rocks are now thousands of feet above sea level, sediments that form the rock were deposited in the Delaware Basin, which was a shallow marine coastal setting at the southern edge of what was then the North American craton. Sediments were deposited in an environment that is thought to be similar to present day environments in the Bahamas or southern Florida (U.S.), where warm climate and clear water is a favorable environment for photosynthetic organisms and formation of carbonate reefs. As the organisms die and are buried, calcium carbonate incorporated from sea water into shells forms Limestone rock, preserving fossils and their ecology in the rock record. Carbonate production in the Delaware Basin formed the Capitan Reef, one of the most extensive and continuous prehistoric limestone reefs now exposed at the land surface. Buried organic matter formed oil and natural gas resources, and ~250,000 wells have been drilled in the surrounding region.

Bedrock that formed in shallow oceans of the Delaware Basin were likely uplifted during the Cenozoic period. Subduction of the Farallon Plate underneath the Western United States thickened buoyant continental crust and uplifted the Colorado Plateau across much of the southwestern United States. Following complete subduction of the Farallon plate in the mid-late Cenozoic, lateral compression was released along the western margin of the North American tectonic plate, and a transform plate boundary formed on the western United States along the San Andreas Fault. Lateral extension of the Colorado Plateau occurred as a result, forming topographic relief and mountainous features along crustal extension features in the Basin and Range province, such as the Rio Grande rift west of the Guadalupe Mountains. A mechanism similar to extension in the Rio Grande rift is thought to have generated topographic relief in the Guadalupe Mountains, and the timing of topographic relief generation has been estimated to ~20 million years ago using cave speleothem records and interpreted to reflect drainage of subsurface aquifers as topographic relief was generated along the margin of the mountain range.

The Guadalupe Mountains are mainly carved by a series of NW-SE trending canyons leading to exposure of marine rocks at their current elevation. In the dry, semi-arid environment, continuous limestone bedrock of the Capitan Reef forms large prominent cliffs traceable across the landscape. These cliffs are typically exposed along the eastern edge of the park. Groundwater circulating through deep fractures dissolves limestone and forms extensive cave networks, including the Carlsbad Caverns.

== Ecology ==
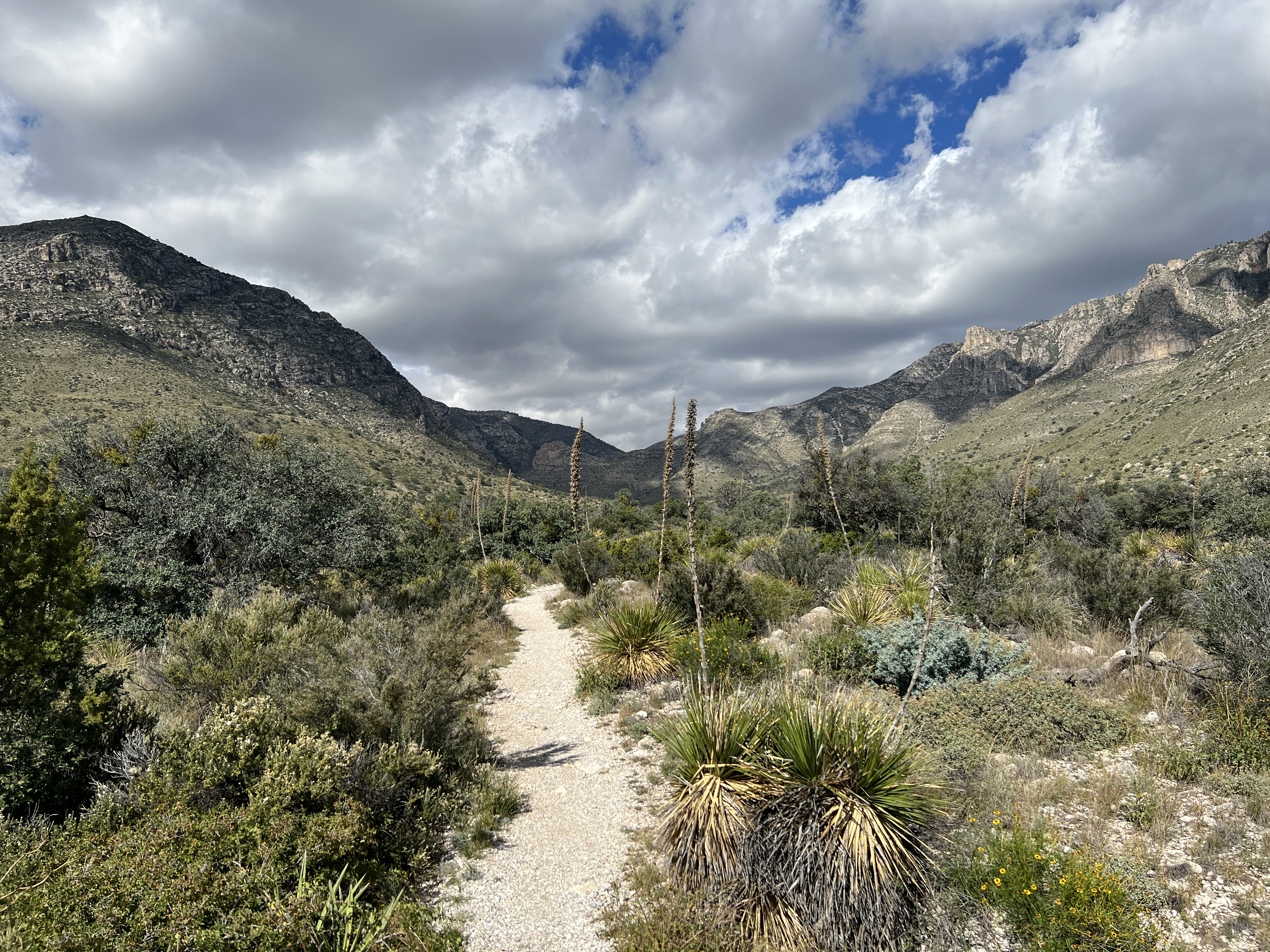
Native vegetation on the Guadalupe Peak Trail

Three major ecosystems are contained within the mountain range. First, deserts exhibit salt flats on the western side of the national park and creosote desert, with low elevations on the east covered with grassland, pinyon pine, and junipers such as alligator juniper and one-seeded juniper. Secondly, canyon interiors such as McKittrick, Bear, and Pine Springs Canyon on the southeast end exhibit maple, ash, chinquapin oak, and other deciduous trees. These trees are able to grow in the desert due to springs of water recharged by wet uplands. Finally, alpine uplands known as "the Bowl" exceeding elevations of 7,000 ft (2,100 m) are covered with denser forests of ponderosa pine, southwestern white pine, and douglas-fir, with small stands of aspen.

The range contains many world-class caves, including Carlsbad Caverns (the best known) and Lechuguilla Cave, discovered in 1986. The history of the range includes occupation by ancient Pueblo and Mogollon peoples, and by the Apache and various Anglo outlaws in the 19th century.

== See also ==
- Beach Mountains
- Trans-Pecos
