= Guadalupe Peak =

Highest mountain peak in Texas

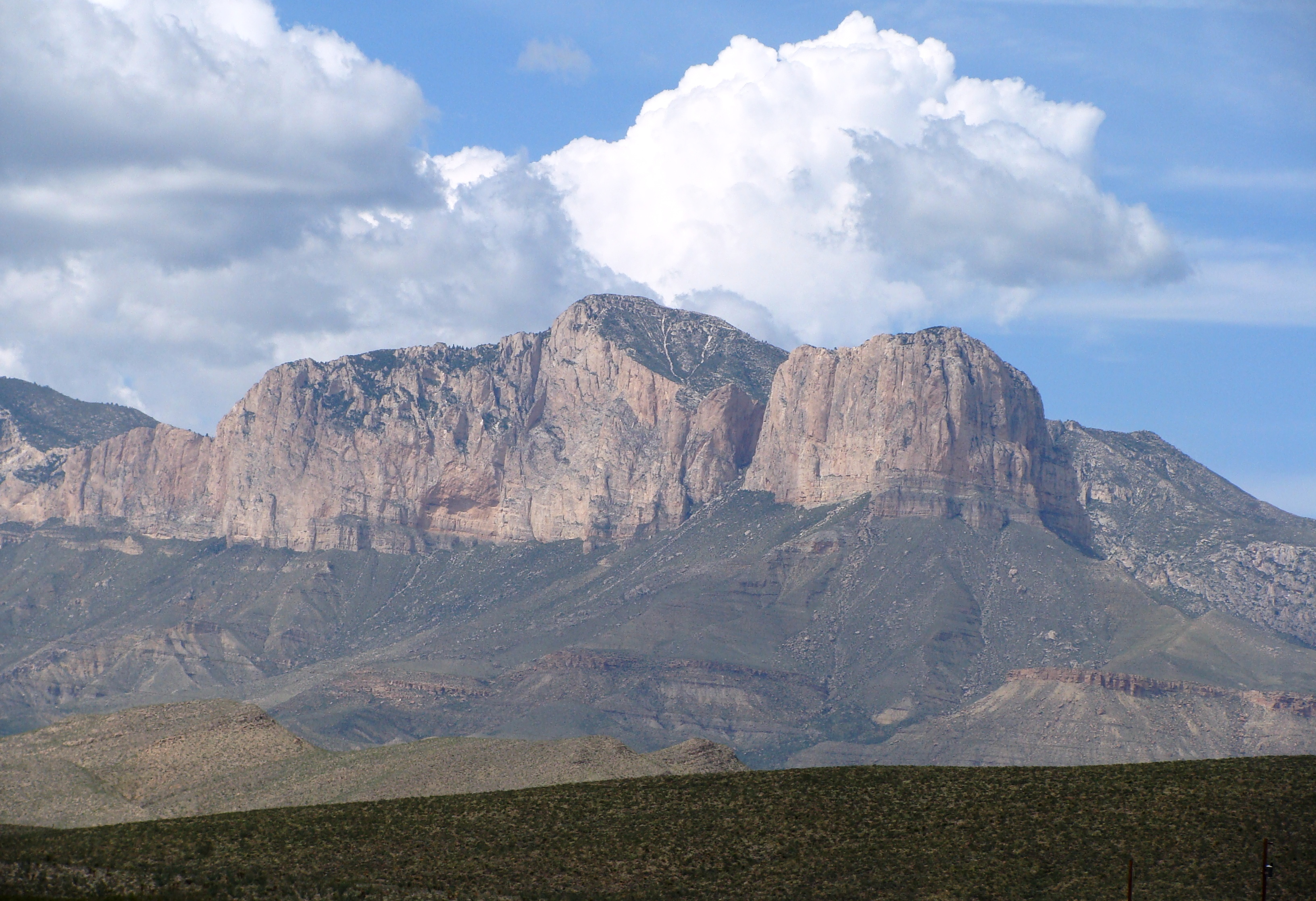

Highest point
- Elevation: 8,751 ft (2,667 m) NAVD 88
- Prominence: 3,029 ft (923 m)
- Listing: State high point 14th
- Coordinates: 31°53′29″N 104°51′39″W

Geography
- Location within Texas
- Location: Culberson County, Texas, U.S.
- Parent range: Guadalupe Mountains
- Topo map: USGS Guadalupe Peak

Guadalupe Peak, also known as Signal Peak, is the highest natural point in Texas, with an elevation of 8,751 feet (2,667 m) above sea level. It is located in Guadalupe Mountains National Park, and is part of the Guadalupe Mountains range in southeastern New Mexico and West Texas. The mountain is about 90 miles (140 km) east of El Paso and about 50 miles (80 km) southwest of Carlsbad, New Mexico. The peak rises more than 3,000 feet (910 m) above the arid floor of the Chihuahuan Desert.

== Trail and summit ==
The peak can be climbed at any time of the year by a maintained stony trail (4.25 miles or 6.8 kilometers each way) with a 3,000-foot (910 m) elevation gain. The trail is part of the network of hiking trails in the surrounding national park.

A stainless steel pyramid marks the summit. It was erected by American Airlines in 1958 to commemorate the 100th anniversary of the Butterfield Overland Mail, a stagecoach route that passed south of the mountain. One side of the pyramid has the American Airlines logo. The second side displays a U.S. Postal Service tribute to the Pony Express Riders of the Butterfield Stage. The third side displays a compass with the logo of the Boy Scouts of America.

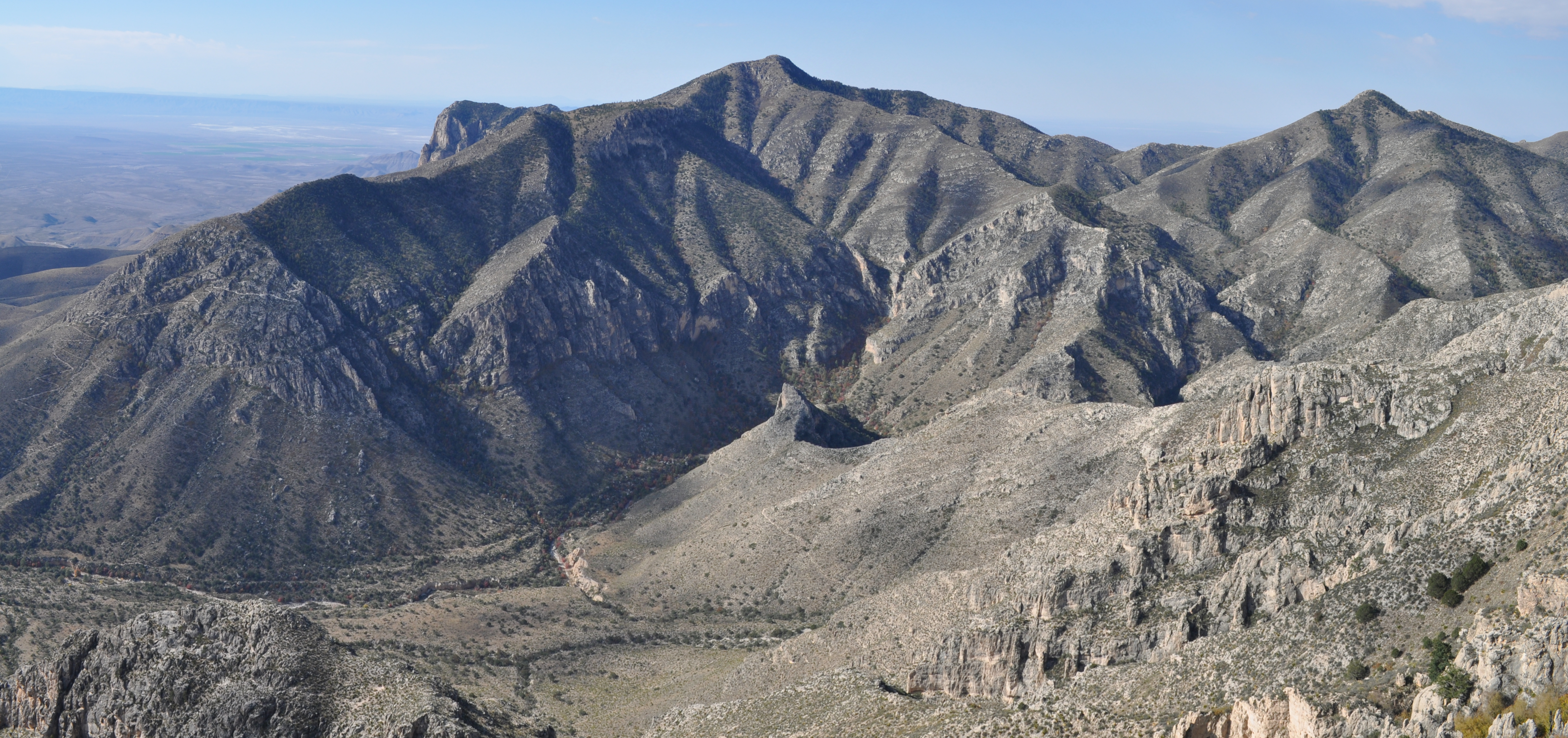
Guadalupe Peak from Hunter Peak

A hiker was found dead on New Year's Eve 2022, as there were wind gusts of more than 50 miles (80 km) per hour and wind chills were "well below freezing".

"At nearly 9,000 feet (2,700 m) above sea level, Guadalupe Peak is a mountain environment with associated risks not found elsewhere in Texas," the park said, noting that the hike is a "very strenuous, 8.4-mile (13.5 km) round trip hike with a 3,000-foot (910 m) elevation gain" to the highest point in the state.

== Climate ==
Guadalupe Peak has a subtropical highland climate (Köppen Cwb). Interpolated climate data based on surrounding stations is presented below:

Climate data for Guadalupe Peak 31.8933 N, 104.8575 W, Elevation: 8,189 ft (2,496 m) (1991–2020 normals)
Month	Jan	Feb	Mar	Apr	May	Jun	Jul	Aug	Sep	Oct	Nov	Dec	Year
Mean daily maximum °F (°C)	45.0 (7.2)	46.8 (8.2)	52.3 (11.3)	58.7 (14.8)	66.8 (19.3)	75.3 (24.1)	73.9 (23.3)	72.2 (22.3)	67.4 (19.7)	61.1 (16.2)	52.7 (11.5)	45.6 (7.6)	59.8 (15.5)
Daily mean °F (°C)	36.2 (2.3)	37.4 (3.0)	42.5 (5.8)	48.6 (9.2)	57.0 (13.9)	64.9 (18.3)	64.5 (18.1)	63.5 (17.5)	58.7 (14.8)	52.0 (11.1)	43.4 (6.3)	36.8 (2.7)	50.5 (10.2)
Mean daily minimum °F (°C)	27.4 (−2.6)	28.1 (−2.2)	32.7 (0.4)	38.5 (3.6)	47.2 (8.4)	54.4 (12.4)	55.1 (12.8)	54.8 (12.7)	50.0 (10.0)	42.9 (6.1)	34.2 (1.2)	28.0 (−2.2)	41.1 (5.1)
Average precipitation inches (mm)	0.66 (17)	0.84 (21)	0.71 (18)	0.43 (11)	1.10 (28)	1.79 (45)	4.21 (107)	4.23 (107)	3.48 (88)	1.56 (40)	1.12 (28)	0.96 (24)	21.09 (534)
Source: PRISM Climate Group

== Gallery ==
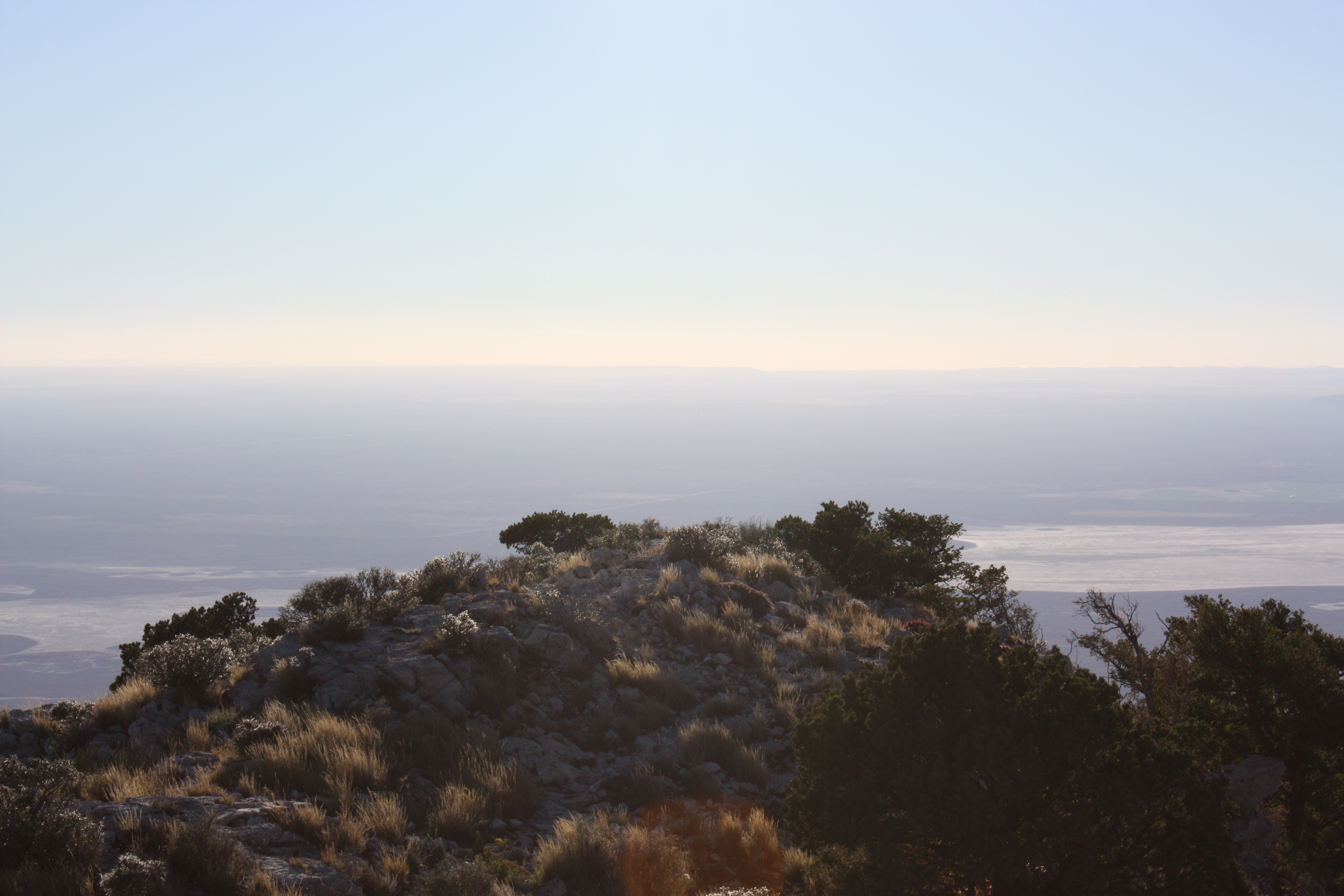
View west from top of peak

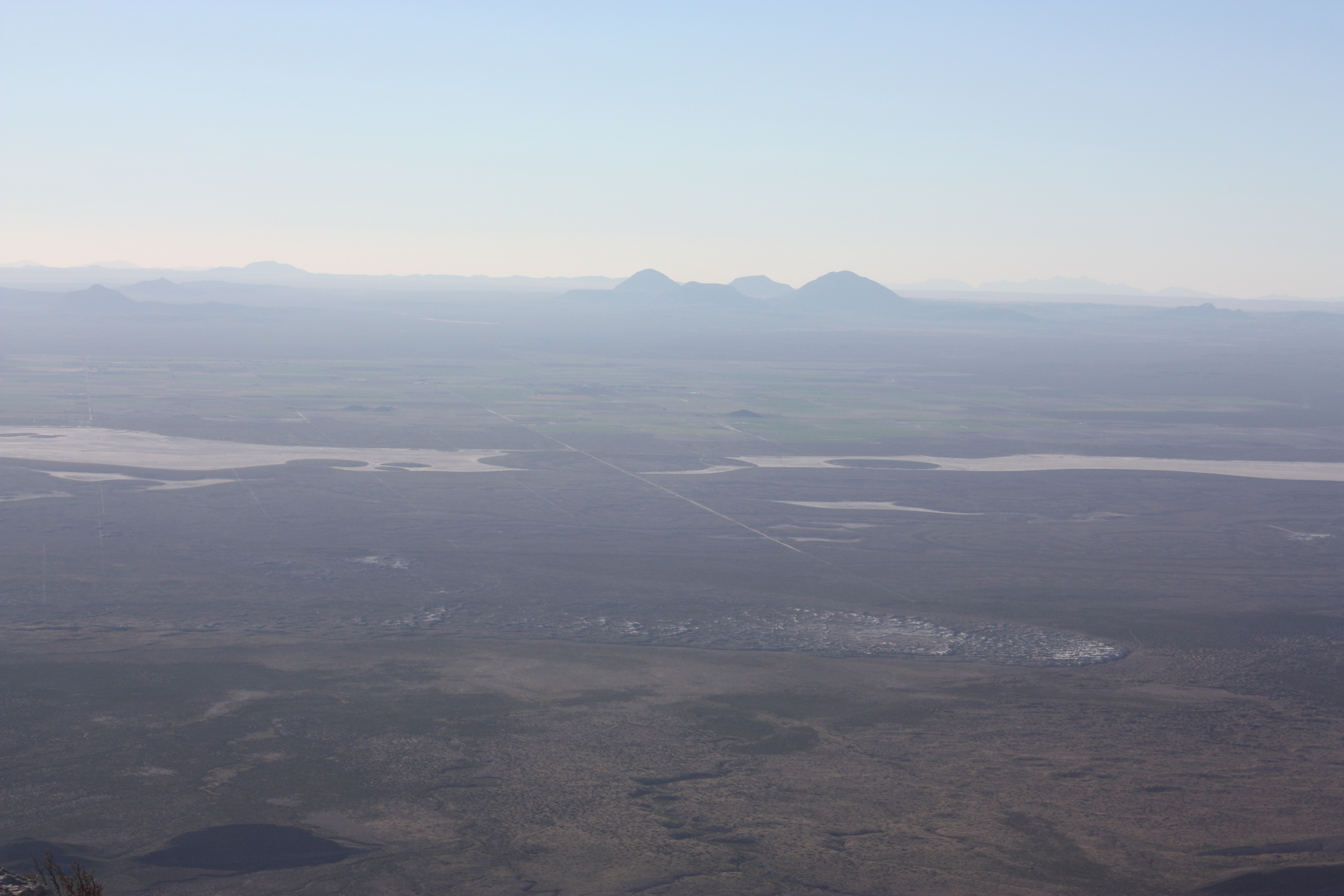
Salt Flats from summit

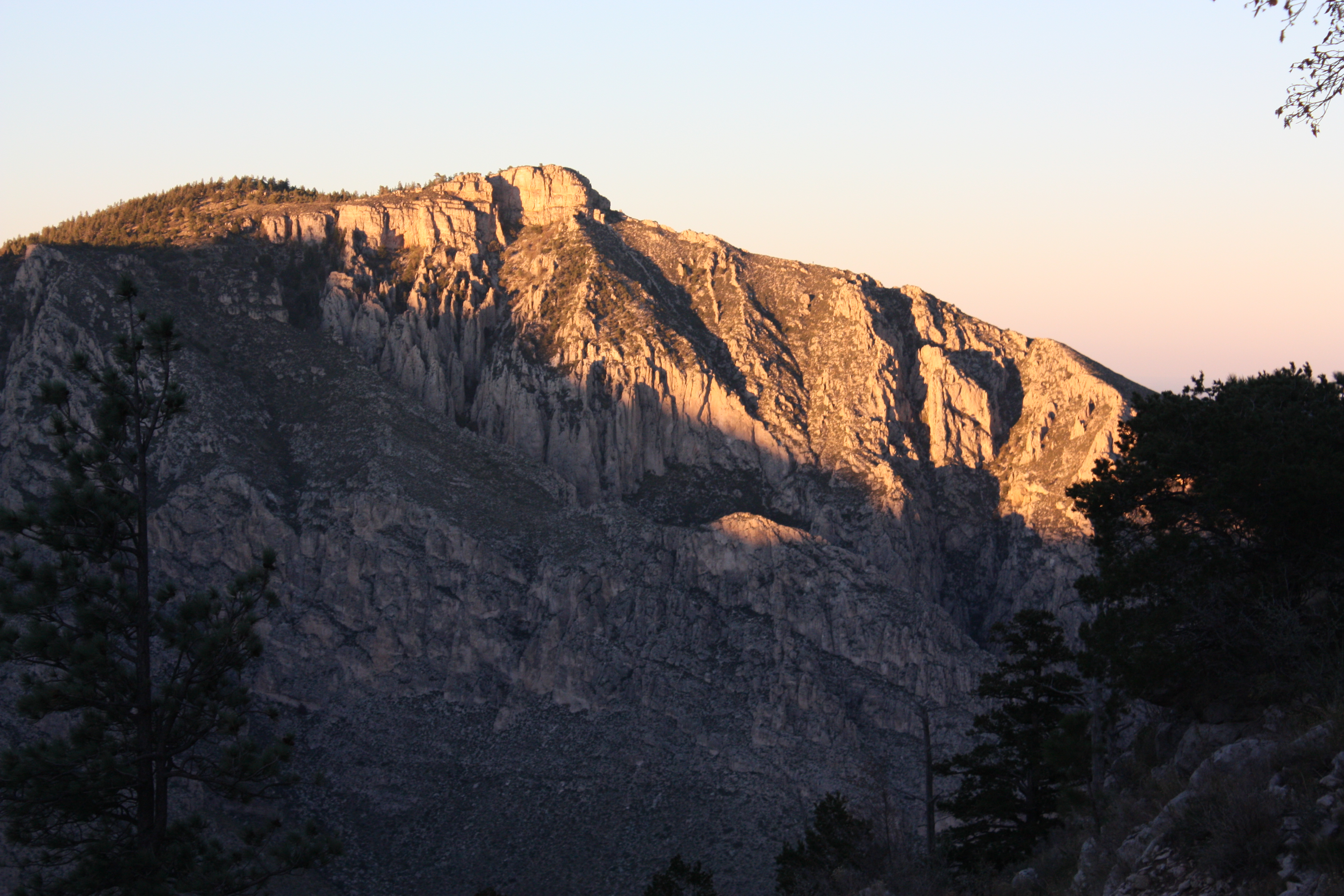
Guadalupe Mountains in sunset

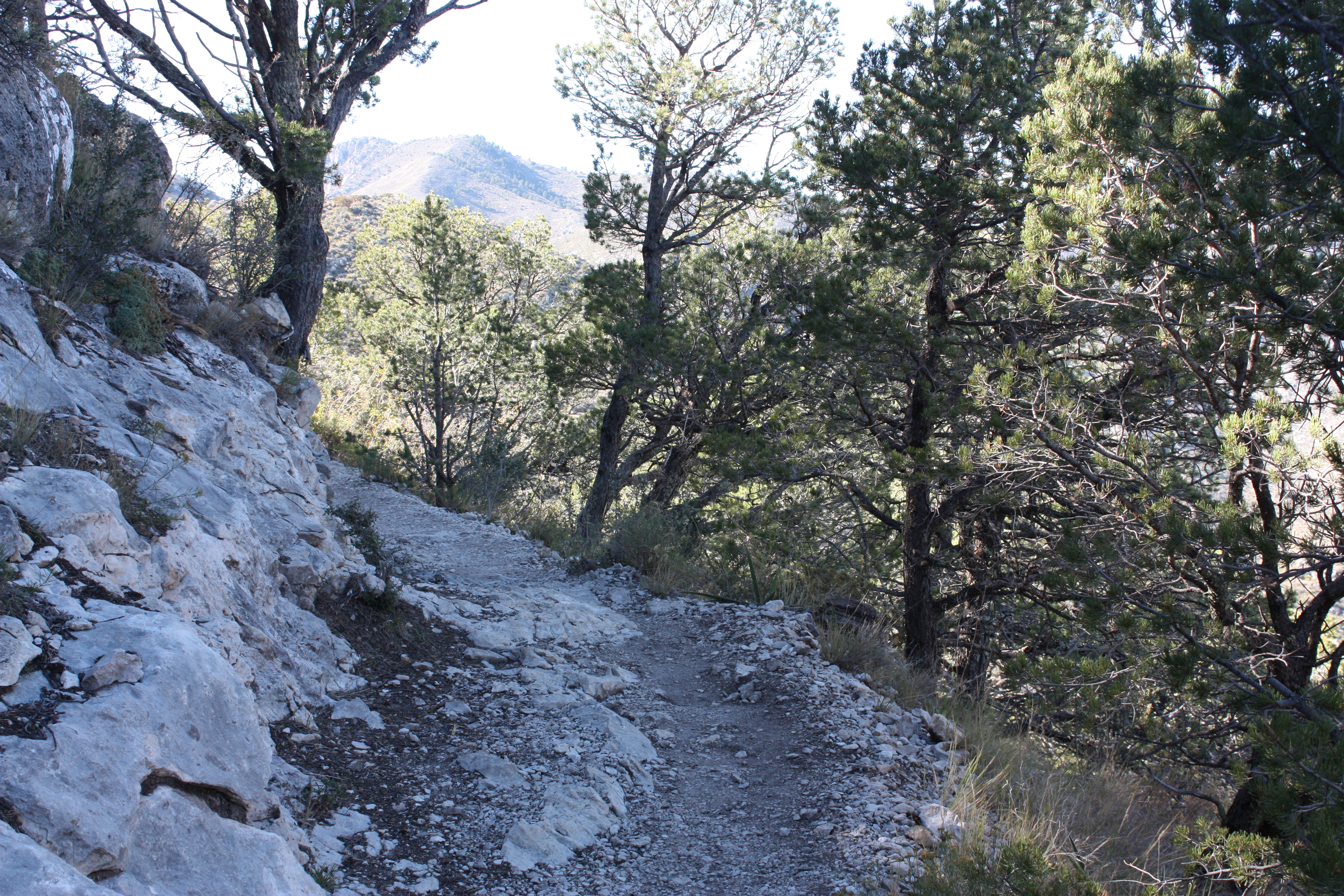
Hiking trail up the peak

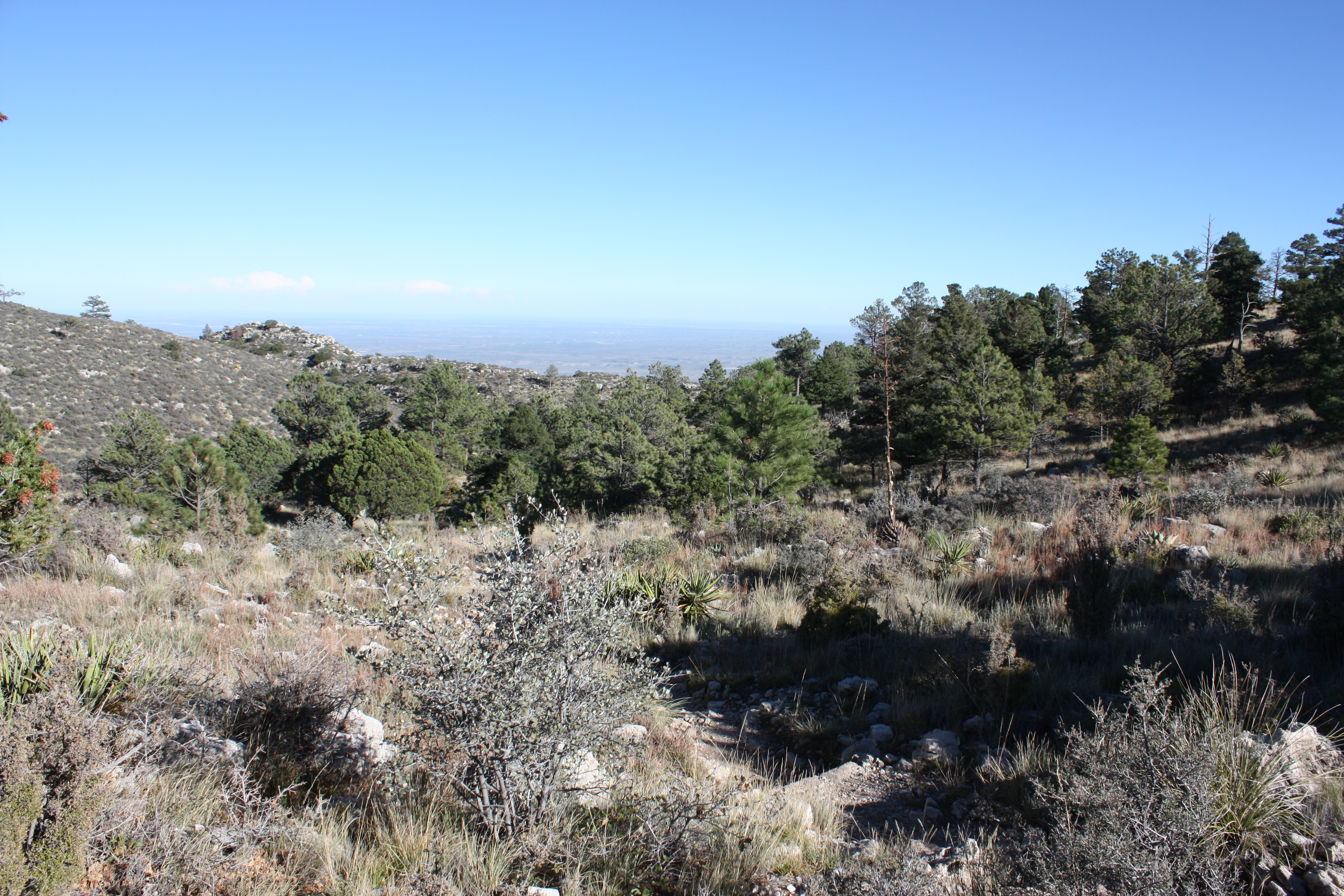
High elevation (8,100 feet (2,500 m)) campground

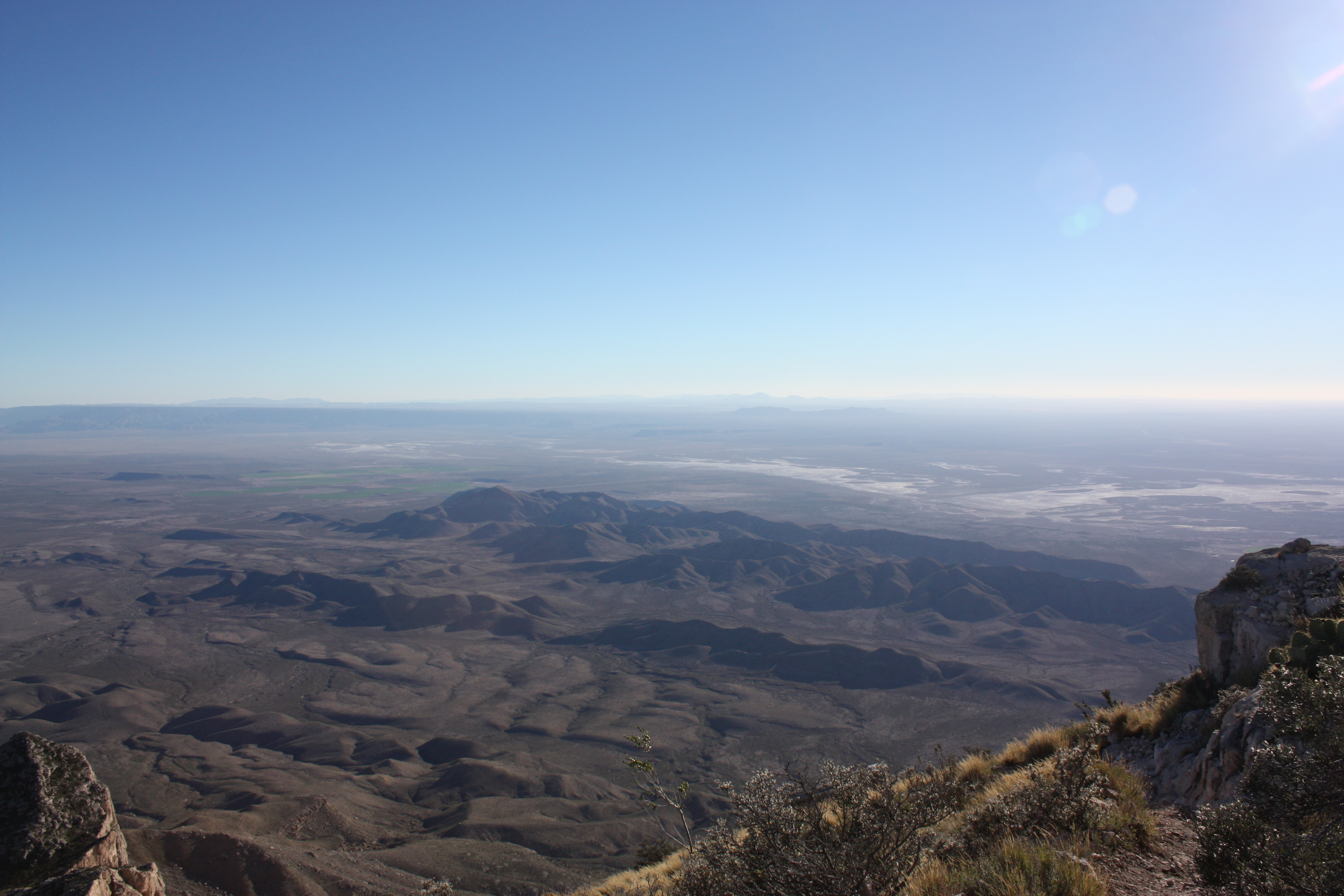
Culberson County, Texas, from the summit

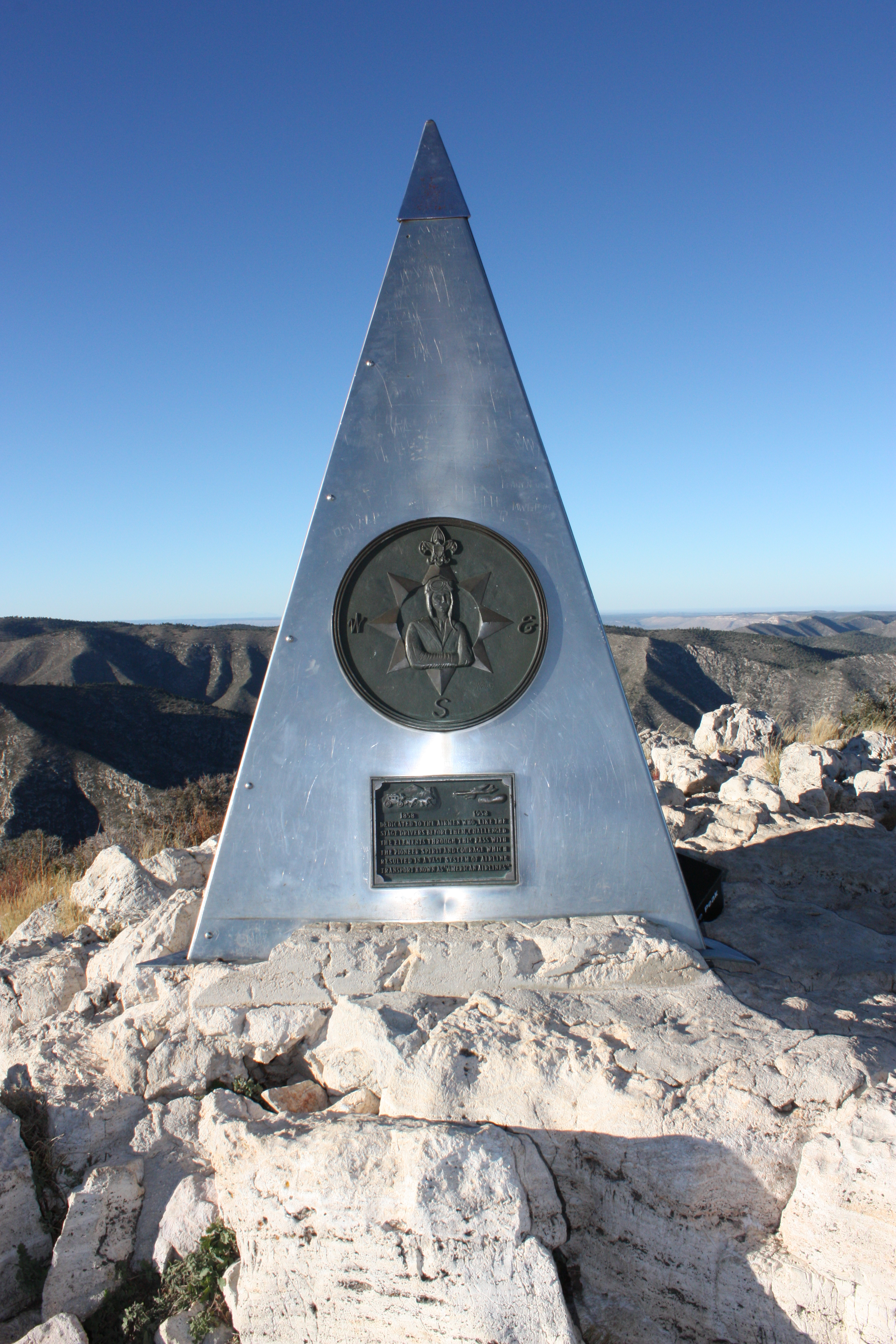
The pyramid at the summit

== See also ==
- List of mountain peaks of North America
  - List of mountain peaks of the United States
    - List of U.S. states by elevation
