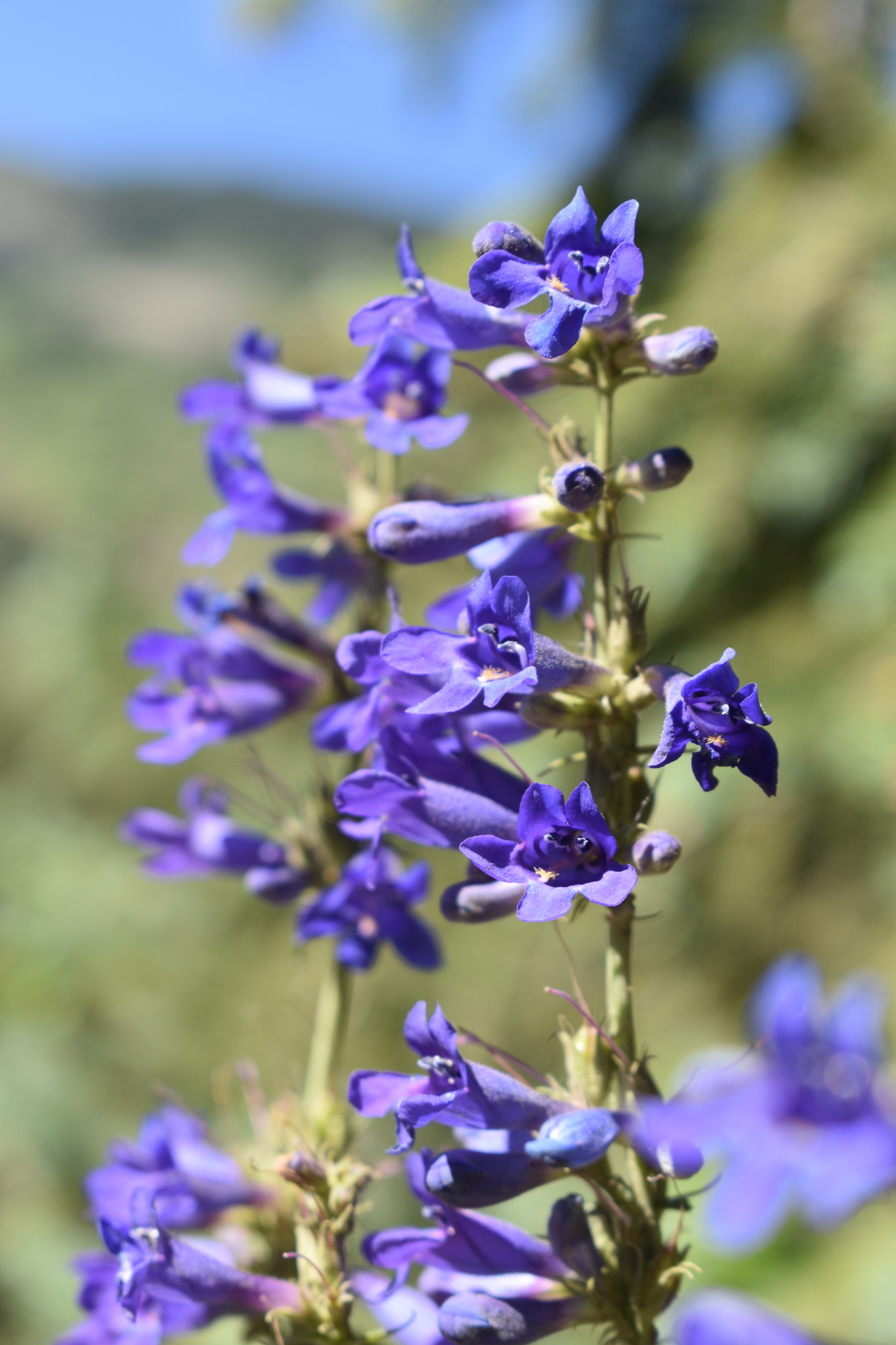
- In Gunnison County, Colorado

Conservation status
- Vulnerable (NatureServe)

Scientific classification
- Kingdom: Plantae
- Clade: Tracheophytes
- Clade: Angiosperms
- Clade: Eudicots
- Clade: Asterids
- Order: Lamiales
- Family: Plantaginaceae
- Genus: Penstemon
- Species: P. mensarum

Binomial name
- Penstemon mensarum Pennell

= Penstemon mensarum =

Plant species in the veronica family

Penstemon mensarum, commonly called Grand Mesa penstemon, is a perennial plant in the veronica family. It has a very limited range in western Colorado, but is also grown in gardens.

== Description ==
Grand Mesa penstemons are perennial plants with flowering stems that are 25 to 90 centimeters (10 to 35.5 in) tall. They are fully herbaceous and relatively long lived, for a penstemon. Its stems grow straight upwards, might be slightly glaucous or not have any covering of natural waxes, and are hairless.

The leaves of the Grand Mesa penstemon are a dull green, but not glaucous, are hairless, lack teeth on their edges, and have faintly visible veins. The basal leaves and the lowest ones on the stems measure 2.8–14.5 centimeters long, but just 0.4–3 cm wide. Their shape is oblong to oblanceolate, like a rounded rectangle or like reversed spear head with the wider part above the midpoint, with smooth edges, tapering bases, and narrow tips. The stems with usually have two to four pairs of leaves, but on occasion may have five. the upper leaves are 2–13.5 cm long and 0.4–3.1 cm wide with a lanceolate shape. The evergreen basal leaves will turn somewhat red-orange in the autumn.

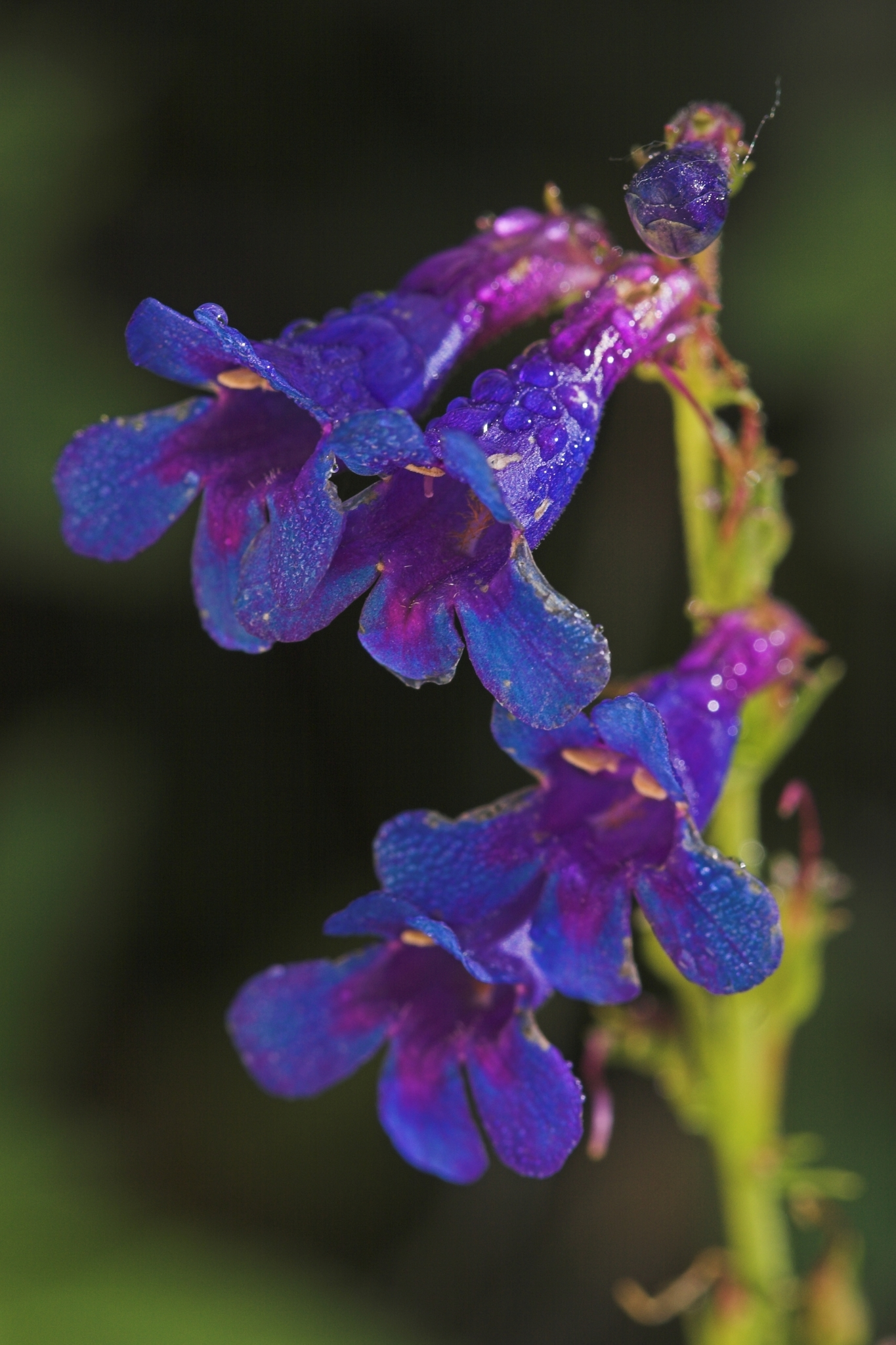
Close up of flowers

The upper part of the flowering stems is the plant's inflorescence. Each measures 10–56 cm and has four to twelve groups of flowers spaced well apart. Each group has two attachment points with one two six flowers that all face in one direction away from the stem. Each group of flowers is accompanied by a pair of bracts 1–5.8 cm long. The flowers are variously described as cobalt blue, verging on iridescent purple-blue, and blue to violet. They measure 16–25 millimeters long with an exterior covered in glandular hairs, but hairless or only having a few glandular hairs inside the floral tube. The two upwards pointing lobes at the mouth of the flower are just 4 mm long while the lower three are longer. The stamens and the single staminode do not extend out of the mouth of the flower. The staminode is 9–11 mm long and somewhat covered in yellow hairs that are 1 mm long. In its native habitat it blooms as early as June or as late as August.

The fruit is a capsule 8–10 mm long by 4–6 mm wide.

== Taxonomy ==
Penstemon mensarum was scientifically described and named by Francis Whittier Pennell in 1920. The type specimen was collected by Arthur F. McDuffie on 15 July 1912 in what is now Grand Mesa National Forest. It is part of the genus Penstemon within the family Plantaginaceae. It has no accepted subspecies and no botanical synonyms. According to a 2016 study it is most closely related to Halls alpine penstemon (Penstemon hallii) and upland penstemon (Penstemon saxosorum). However, an earlier 2006 study found it most closely related to the pinto penstemon, though still part of a clade with P. saxosorum but also including Harrington's penstemon (Penstemon harringtonii).

=== Names ===
The species name, mensarum means "of the table" in Botanical Latin as a reference to it being found on Grand Mesa in Colorado. Similarly, it is known by the common names Grand Mesa penstemon and Grand Mesa beardtongue. It is also called the tiger beardtongue.

== Range and habitat ==
Grand Mesa penstemons are endemic to the state of Colorado in the western United States. There it is only certainly documented in three Western Slope counties: Mesa, Delta, and Gunnison. However, there is uncertain evidence for it also beinf found in Garfield, Montrose, and Pitkin counties. There are only nine occurrences that are documented as being in good or excellent health and another 30 that have not been recently documented or surveyed. Within their range they grow above 2,200 meters (7,200 ft) up to elevations of around 3,000 m (9,800 ft).

It grows in openings between quaking aspen groves and the sagebrush steppes. Like the Rocky Mountain penstemon it is often found growing in roadcuts in its mountain habitat.

=== Conservation ===
In 2023 NatureServe evaluated Grand Mesa penstemon and rated it as vulnerable at both the global and state level due to its limited range. Though the majority of documented populations are found on Forest Service lands it will probably be impacted by climate change.

== Cultivation ==
Grand Mesa penstemons were being listed in books on rock gardening as early as 1937. It is fairly adaptable and is used in rock gardens, xeriscape plantings, and perennial borders. They will tolerate clay, loam, or sandy soils and require modest amounts of water to dry conditions. In garden conditions it is fairly long lived and long blooming. Though tolerant of cloudy and rainy weather, Grand Mesa penstemons require part-sun to full sun exposure.

If the flowering stems are cut back after blooming, but before energy is put into developing seeds, then the plant will produce more flowers in the next spring. Plants are propagated by seed or by stem cuttings using rooting hormones.
