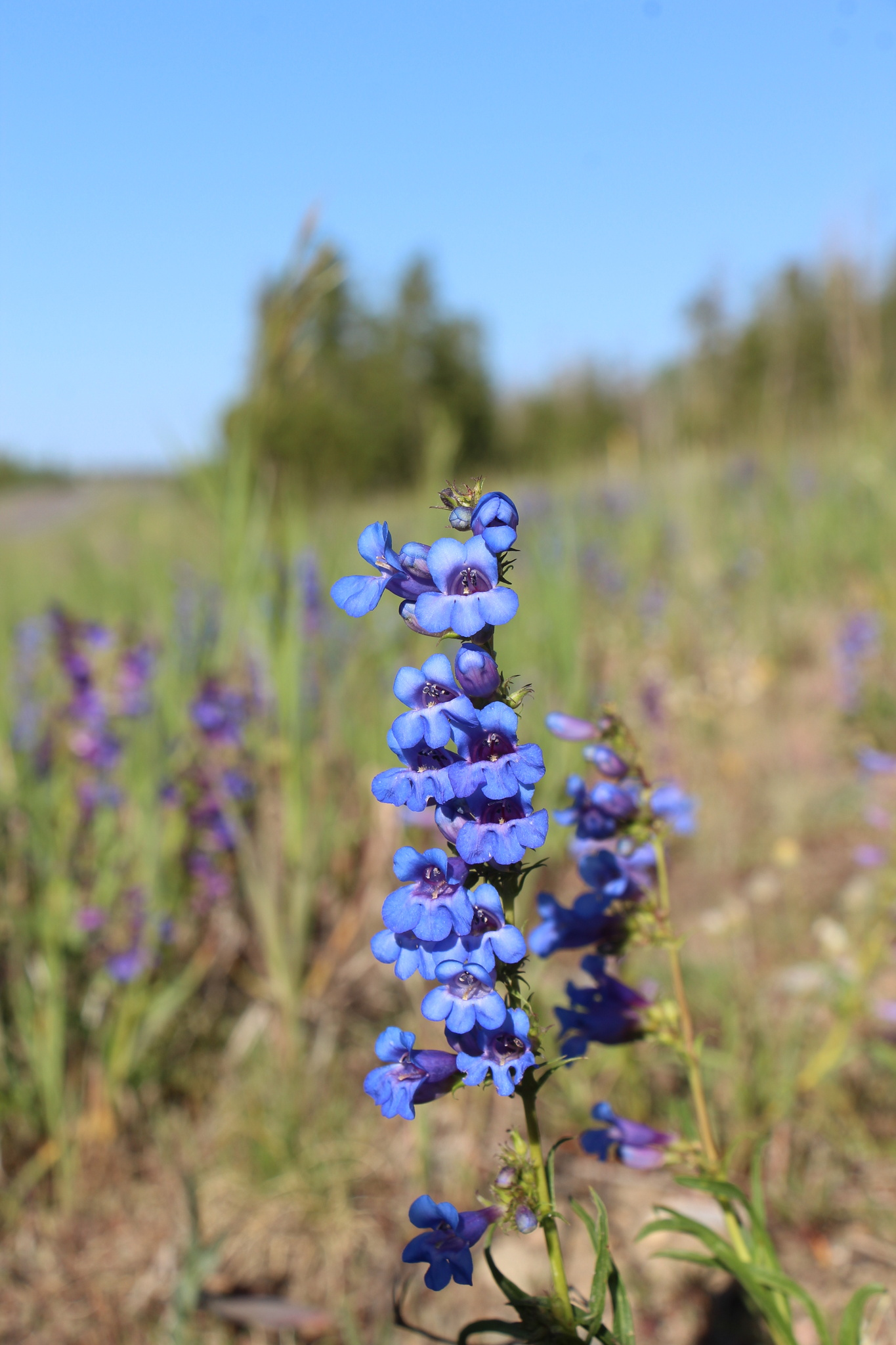
- Medicine Bow National Forest, Albany County, Wyoming

Conservation status
- Vulnerable (NatureServe)

Scientific classification
- Kingdom: Plantae
- Clade: Tracheophytes
- Clade: Angiosperms
- Clade: Eudicots
- Clade: Asterids
- Order: Lamiales
- Family: Plantaginaceae
- Genus: Penstemon
- Species: P. saxosorum

Binomial name
- Penstemon saxosorum Pennell

= Penstemon saxosorum =

Plant species in the veronica family

Penstemon saxosorum, with the common name upland penstemon, is a species of plant from northwestern Colorado and southern Wyoming.

== Description ==
The upland penstemon is a herbaceous plant with flowering stems that can be 10 to 80 centimeters (3.9 to 31.5 in) tall, but that are usually taller than 30 cm (12 in). The plants are hairless and are also not glaucous, covered in natural waxes.

Upland penstemons have both basal leaves and cauline, those attached to the stems. The leaves attached to the base of the plant and the lowest ones on the stems are oblanceolate to linear-oblanceolate, shaped like a reversed spear head with the widest part past the midpoint of the leaf to being very narrow and somewhat similar blade of grass. They measure 2.6–14 centimeters (1.0–5.5 in) long by just 3–19 millimeters long. Their bases are narrow and they attach directly to the plant without a petiole and the edges are smooth. On the stems there are five to nine pairs of leaves. The uppermost leaves are 5–9 cm long and 3–18 mm wide, but are more usually 6–9 mm. Their bases clasp the flowering stem and they have a narrow point.

The inflorescences are the upper 5 to 40 cm (2 to 16 in) of the flowering stems, unlike the rest of the plant they can have some glandular hairs. The flowers are in four to nine groups and might be crowded together or somewhat spaced apart. They also can face all in one direction or in all directions. In each of the groups of flowers there will be two attachment points on the stem with one to five flowers on each one.

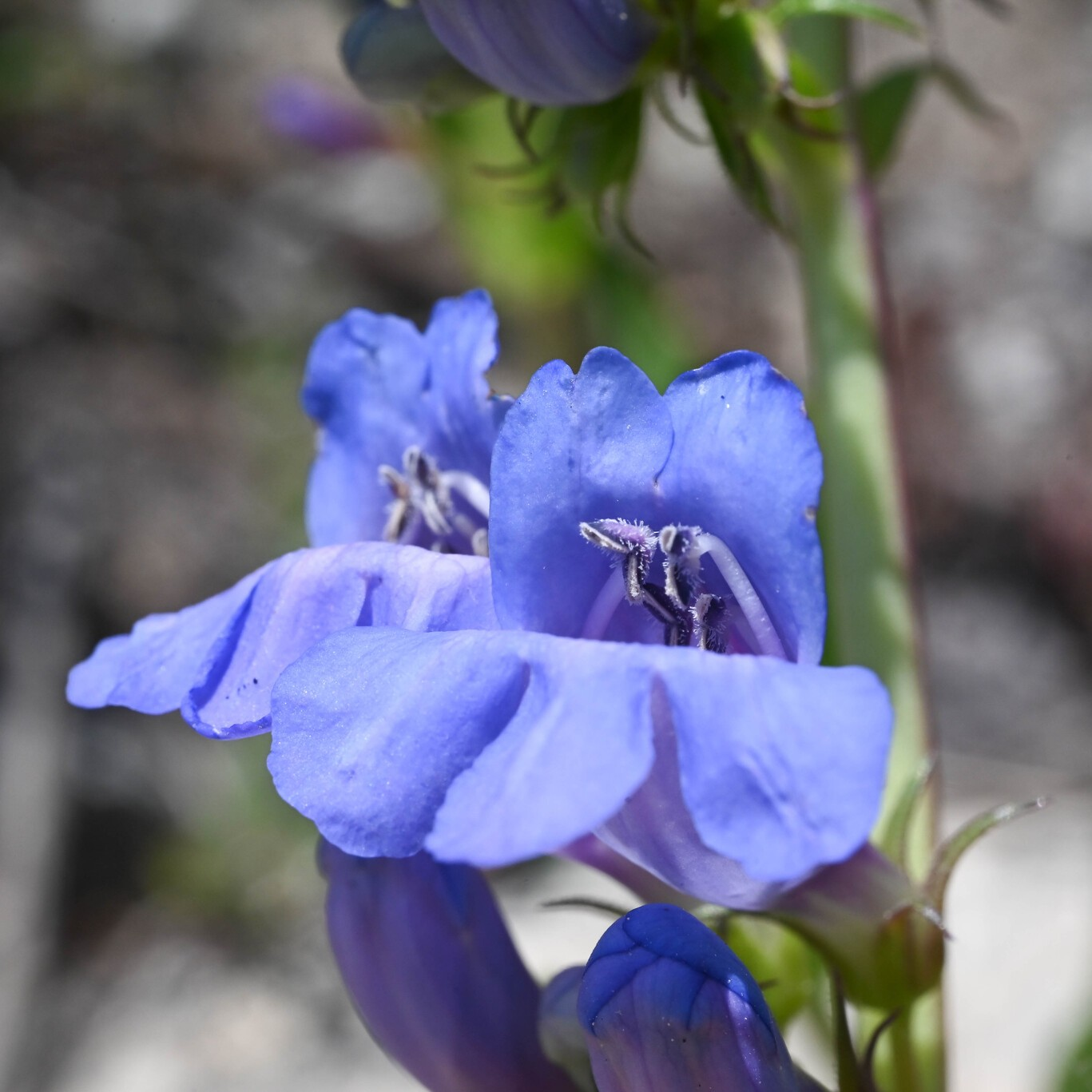
Close up of flowers showing the two longest stamens extending out of the flower mouth

The flowers are deep blue to purple-blue in color. The tube of the flower is puffed out and measures 17–30 millimeters long, though they usually do not exceed 25 mm. They can be smooth or have glandular hairs on the outside or the inside of the flowers and also can have reddish-purple floral guides or lack them. The longest pair of stamens will either reach or extend out of the flower's mouth slightly. The sterile staminode is 12–15 mm, has sparse yellow hairs, and also reaches the mouth of the flower or extends out of it slightly.

The fruit is a capsule that is 8–12 mm long and 4–6 mm wide.

It is a similar plant to bluestem penstemon (Penstemon cyanocaulis), Penstemon subglaber, and Penstemon mensarum.

== Taxonomy ==
Penstemon saxosorum was scientifically described and named in 1920 by Francis W. Pennell. It is classified as in the genus Penstemon within the family Plantaginaceae and has no synonyms or subspecies. A 2006 study of the genetics of penstemon species found Penstemon saxosorum to be most closely related to Halls alpine penstemon (Penstemon hallii) and then Grand Mesa penstemon (Penstemon mensarum). However, an earlier 2006 study found its closest relative to be Harrington's penstemon (Penstemon harringtonii), but agreed that it was in a clade with P. mensarum that also includes pinto penstemon (Penstemon bicolor).

=== Names ===
The species name, saxosorum, means "of the Rockies" or "of rocky places". It is known as the upland penstemon or as the upland beardtongue.

== Range and habitat ==
The upland penstemon is definitely native to the western US states of Colorado and Wyoming, however there are plants in the Bridger Basin that extend across the border into Daggett and Uintah counties in Utah that might be upland penstemon and are classified as Penstemon subglaber until further studies are conducted. In Colorado the species grows in six counties; Moffat, Routt, Jackson, Rio Blanco County, Garfield, and Eagle counties in the northwest of the state. To the north in Wyoming they grow in just two south-central counties, Carbon and Albany. They are found between elevations of 2,400 and 3,600 meters (7,900 and 11,800 ft).

They grow on sagebrush steppes and in openings in coniferous forests and are associated with rocky ground.

=== Conservation ===
Upland penstemons were last evaluated by NatureServe in 1993 and at that time were rated as vulnerable (G3) due to their limited range. It was also rated as vulnerable in both Colorado and Wyoming.

== See also ==
- List of Penstemon species
