= Chaetopappa plomoensis =

Scientific classification
- Kingdom: Plantae
- Clade: Tracheophytes
- Clade: Angiosperms
- Clade: Eudicots
- Clade: Asterids
- Order: Asterales
- Family: Asteraceae
- Genus: Chaetopappa
- Species: C. plomoensis

Binomial name
- Chaetopappa plomoensis B.L.Turner

Species of flowering plant

Chaetopappa plomoensis is a North American species of plants in the family Asteraceae. It found only in the State of Coahuila in northern Mexico.

Chaetopappa plomoensis grows on steep limestone slopes and cliffs in the Chihuahuan Desert. It is very similar to the more widespread C. parryi but has leaves that are pubescent on both surfaces, and a distinctive pappus attached to the achenes, long narrow bristles instead of the short scales characteristic of C. parryi.
