= Chaetopappa imberbis =

Scientific classification
- Kingdom: Plantae
- Clade: Tracheophytes
- Clade: Angiosperms
- Clade: Eudicots
- Clade: Asterids
- Order: Asterales
- Family: Asteraceae
- Genus: Chaetopappa
- Species: C. imberbis

Binomial name
- Chaetopappa imberbis (A.Gray) G.L.Nesom

Synonyms
- Chaetopappa asteroides var. imberbis A.Gray

Species of flowering plant

Chaetopappa imberbis, called the awnless lazy daisy, or awnless leastdaisy, is a North American species of plants in the family Asteraceae. It has been found only in south-central Texas.
