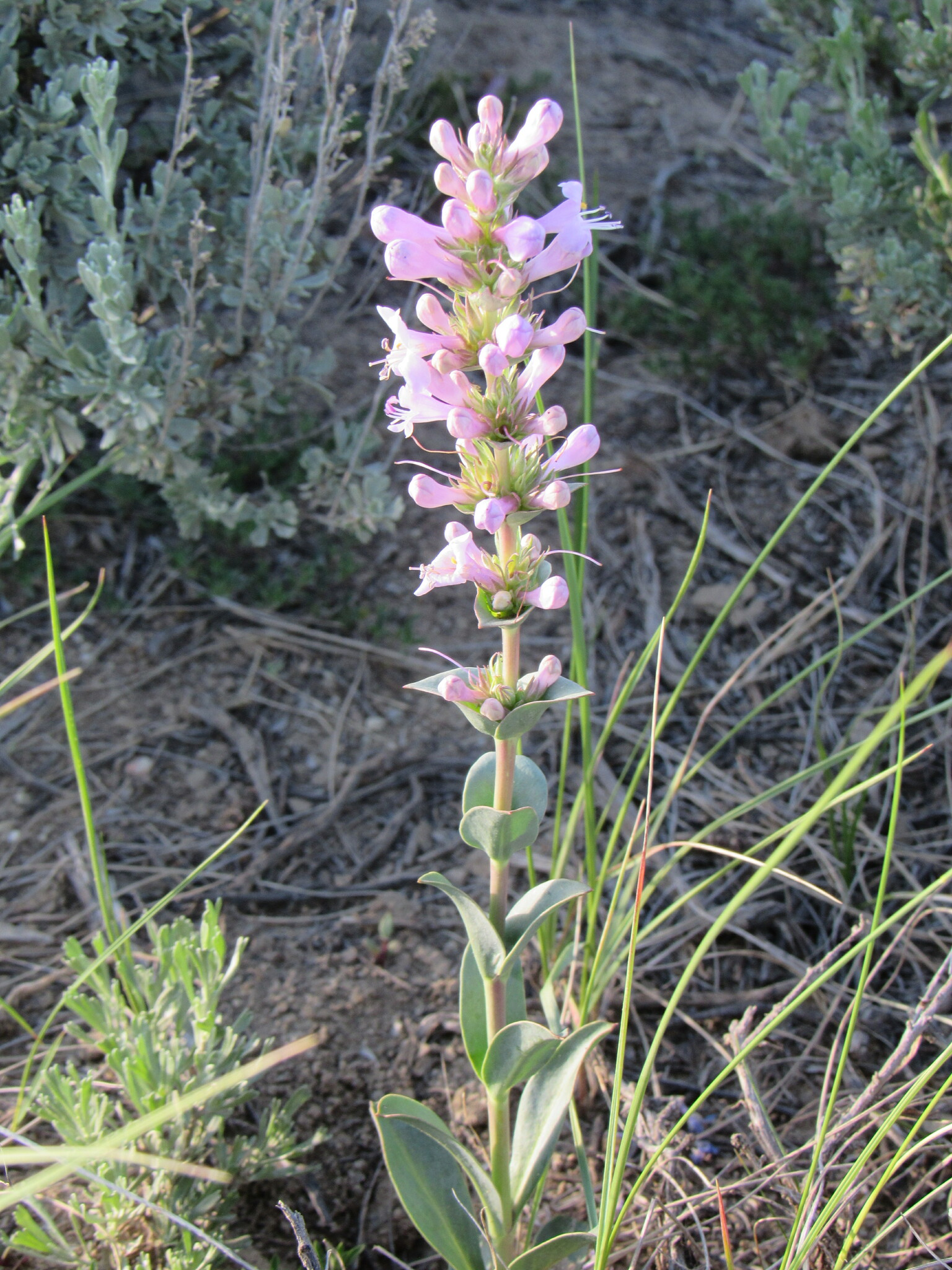
- Penstemon cyathophorus blooming in Grand County, Colorado

Conservation status
- Vulnerable (NatureServe)

Scientific classification
- Kingdom: Plantae
- Clade: Embryophytes
- Clade: Tracheophytes
- Clade: Spermatophytes
- Clade: Angiosperms
- Clade: Eudicots
- Clade: Asterids
- Order: Lamiales
- Family: Plantaginaceae
- Genus: Penstemon
- Species: P. cyathophorus

Binomial name
- Penstemon cyathophorus Rydb.

= Penstemon cyathophorus =

Plant species in the veronica family

Penstemon cyathophorus, commonly known as cupped penstemon or Middle Park penstemon, is a species of flowering plant that grows in a small area in the mountains of northern Colorado and a smaller area of southern Wyoming. As a rare species with a limited range it is vulnerable to human development. It is not a large plant and is often found growing amid sagebrush plants in mountain basins and valleys.

== Description ==
Penstemon cyathophorus is a modest sized plant, averaging 19–42 centimeters in height, but occasionally growing to just 13 cm. The stems are round in cross section and grow straight upwards from the base of the plant. It is a perennial plant that grows as clump of plants from entangled roots (cespitose). Both the stems and the leaves are hairless and smooth in texture.

Both basal leaves and ones attached directly to the flower stems are present in Penstemon cyathophorus. The leaves at the base of the plant and also the lowest of the cauline leaves are similar in shape and size, 13–57 millimeters long and 4–19 mm in width. They may be spoon shaped with a narrow neck and wide end or have widened end but only tapering towards the base (oblanceolate). The ends of the leaves may be rounded, come to sharp point, or even have the central vein project slightly beyond the leaf blade.

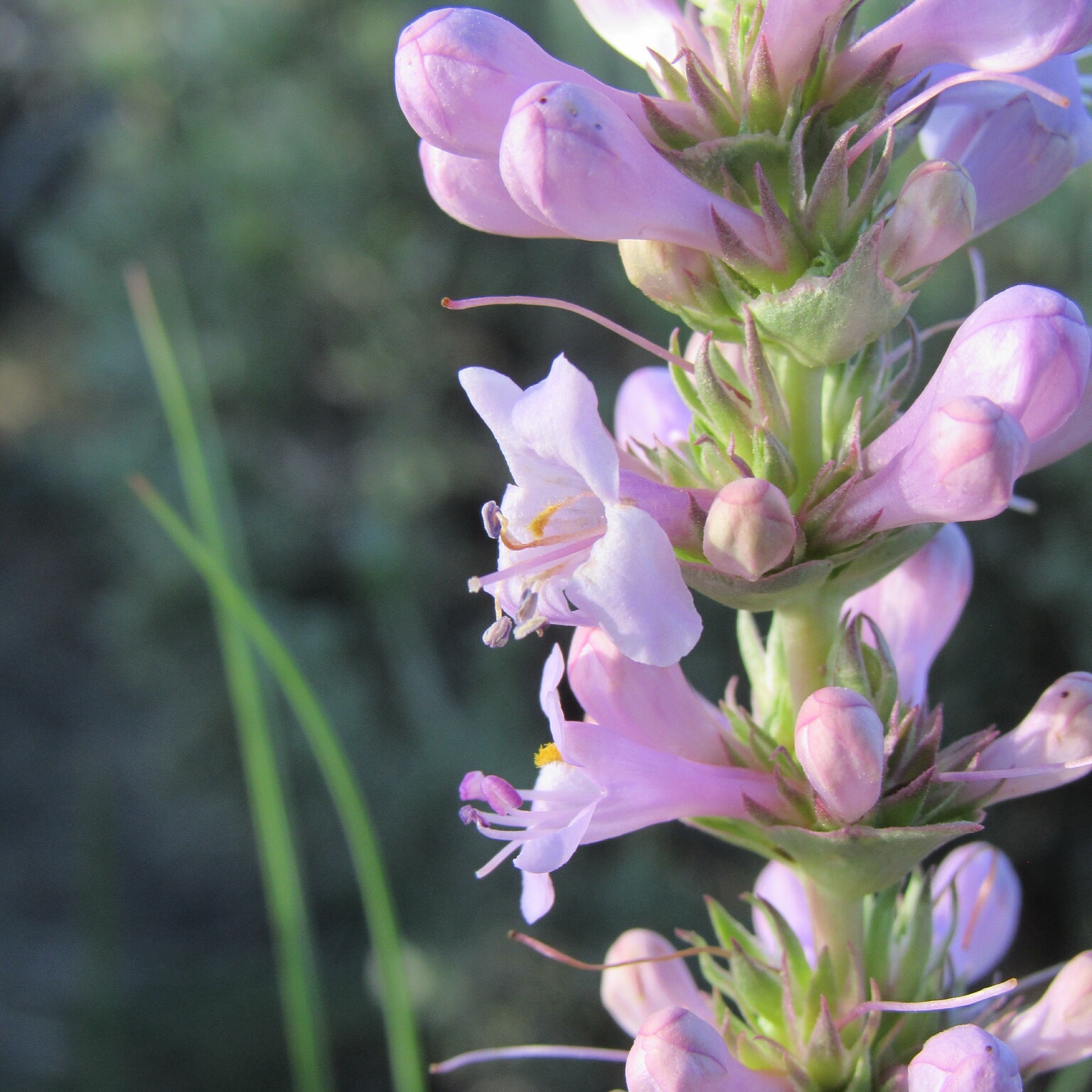
Photograph showing the stamens exserted out of the flower mouth

The flowers are variously describe as pink-purple, lavender, or lavender-blue in color and do not have any nectar guide lines. They are shapes like a broad, fairly open funnel. The overall length of the flower is may be 11–14 millimeters long. A distinctive feature of the flower is that the four stamens extend out of the opening of the flower, a somewhat unusual feature in a penstemon. Entirely uniquely for a member of its genus, the staminode with its golden hairs has its end against the upper side of the flower tube rather than against the lower side.

The fruit is a capsule 5–6 millimeters in height and 4–5 mm wide.

Penstemon cyathophorus is very similar to Penstemon harringtonii, which also has two of its stamens extending out of its flowers and grows nearby. However, generally the cupped penstemon grows to the northeast and the flower are shorter than P. harringtonii's 17–24 millimeters. It also resembles Penstemon acuminatus, however their ranges do not overlap and only P. harringtonii and P. cyathophorus lack nectar guides.

== Taxonomy ==
Penstemon cyathophorus was scientifically described as a species in 1905 by the botanist Per Axel Rydberg, though using the then current spelling of Pentstemon with an extra "t". It has no botanical synonyms or subspecies. It is part of the large Penstemon genus in the plantain family, Plantaginaceae. The first specimen of this species was collected in Colorado in 1901 by Frank Tweedy.

Genetic testing has confirmed that the close relationship of the species to Penstemon harringtonii within a group of penstemons also including Penstemon acuminatus, Penstemon arenicola, and Penstemon flowersii.

=== Names ===
It has large bracts under its groups of flowers that look somewhat cup like and for this reason it was given the botanical Greek name cyathophorus, meaning "cup bearing". This species is known by several common names in English. It is called the cupped penstemon, a translation of its scientific name and Middle Park penstemon for the place it was first collected. In addition it is called sagebrush beardtounge, however it at least occasionally shares this name with Penstemon speciosus. It is similarly called the sagebrush penstemon. The American Penstemon Society also uses the name North Park penstemon for this species.

== Range and habitat ==
Penstemon cyathophorus has a limited range, sources in agree that it grows in Summit, Grand, and Jackson County in Colorado and also in Carbon County, Wyoming. The USDA Natural Resources Conservation Service PLANTS database additionally records it in Sweetwater County, Wyoming as does the Colorado Native Plant Society. In Colorado it grows amid the sagebrush in Middle Park and in North Park, two flat basins surrounded by the Rocky Mountains. In Wyoming they grow on the Sierra Madre Range and North Platte River Valley. They grow between 2100–2900 meters in elevation in rocky clay loam soils.

Most populations of the plant are in North Park with smaller numbers in outlying areas. It grows scattered amid the sagebrush and also in lower mountain meadows. In 2018 NatureServe evaluated it as vulnerable (G3), as a plant that has a limited distribution and may face increasing threats due to oil and gas development. At the state level they gave it the same status in Colorado and ranked it as imperiled (S2) in Wyoming.

== Ecology ==
Observations of mule deer in an enclosure in Middle Park found that they almost never eat cupped penstemon.

Penstemon cyathophorus displays resistance to sprouting if its seeds have not been cold-moist stratified by planting them at 4.5 °C (40 °F) or outdoors in cool spring weather. When planted at 21 °C (70 °F) without any treatment no seeds sprouted after eight weeks. Treatment with the plant hormone gibberellic acid also released the seeds from dormancy, 100% sprouting in two to four weeks without cold treatment. Seeds dry stored for two years had 21% germination rate after three days in a test where they were cold treated for three months before being moved to a greenhouse at 21 °C.

== See also ==
List of Penstemon species
