= Chaetopappa hersheyi =

Conservation status
- Vulnerable (NatureServe)

Scientific classification
- Kingdom: Plantae
- Clade: Tracheophytes
- Clade: Angiosperms
- Clade: Eudicots
- Clade: Asterids
- Order: Asterales
- Family: Asteraceae
- Genus: Chaetopappa
- Species: C. hersheyi

Binomial name
- Chaetopappa hersheyi S.F.Blake

Species of flowering plant

Chaetopappa hersheyi is a rare perennial plant species of plant called Hershey's cliff daisy, in the sunflower family. The epithet "hersheyi" honors the plant's discoverer, Arthur LeRoy Hershey, who collected it in 1944. It was formally described by Sidney Fay Blake in 1946.

Other vernacular names have been adapted to this plant including Guadalupe least daisy and Guadalupe lazy daisy. this name emerges from the fact that these plants are found in the Guadalupe Mountains in western Texas and southeastern New Mexico. Many of the populations lie inside Guadalupe Mountains National Park and the nearby Carlsbad Caverns National Park.

== Description ==
Chaetopappa hersheyi grows to an average of about 5 cm (2 in) high, but have been recorded to up to 15 cm (6 in), producing a single flower head. The stem has rigid and ascending hairs usually with 4–6 leaves on it. The leaves are spatulate or lance-shaped and spiny at the tip, they range from 1.5 to 6.0 mm (0.06 to 0.24 in) long and up to 1 mm (0.04 in) wide. Composed of white ray florets and yellow disk florets, the flower heads resembles those of the common or lawn daisy, Bellis perennis, in color. They originally blossom a light bluish color, then fading to white when mature and finally drying maroon.

It is considered an herb because it lacks woody material when established. Hershey's cliff daisy is a vascular, seed and flowering plant, this implies that these plants conduct water and minerals through the plant, and produce seeds and flowers. A type of simple, dry fruit is produced from this plant called an achene.

== Ecology ==
It is native to steep limestone cliffs in woodland and rocky Mountain montane coniferous forest communities, as well as walls, ledges and banks, usually at 1,500–2,400 m (4,900–7,900 ft). It is relatively abundant in the Guadalupe Mountains.

The plant grows in full sun to partial shade conditions and its blooming time is in late spring to early fall, with the most blooming during May. It attracts bees, butterflies and birds. There are no major threats to this species other than collection along trails. Most plants grow in inaccessible locations, however.

The species has a NatureServe conservation status of G3, vulnerable. This implies that it is at moderate risk of extirpation, or extinction, in its jurisdiction due to its restricted range. The plant grows around seeps.
