= Harold Harrington =

American botanist (1903–1981)

- Born: Harold David Harrington; March 14, 1903; De Motte, Indiana, US
- Died: January 22, 1981 (aged 77)
- Education: Iowa State Teachers College (B.A.); University of Northern Iowa (M.S., Ph.D.)
- Spouse: Edith Jirsa
- Scientific career
- Fields: Botany
- Workplaces: Colorado State University
- Author abbrev. (botany): H.D.Harr.

Harold David Harrington (March 14, 1903 – January 22, 1981) was an American botanist who specialized in flora of Colorado and the Rocky Mountains. He worked on the faculty of Colorado State University (CSU) and collected over 10,000 botanical specimens from across the state. His 1954 book, Manual of the Plants of Colorado, was the first comprehensive flora of Colorado in nearly 50 years and remains an authoritative work.

With his wife and fellow botanist Edith, he traveled around the United States, Europe, and Pacific, bringing back botanical photographs for use in teaching. He published 17 books while at CSU, where the majority of his collection of specimens are kept as part of the university's herbarium that he had previously curated. He is the namesake of two species of flowering plants endemic to Colorado: Oenothera harringtonii and Penstemon harringtonii.

== Early life and education ==
Harold David Harrington was born on March 14, 1903, in De Motte, Indiana. He moved with his family from De Motte to Mitchell, South Dakota, in 1909 and then to Graettinger, Iowa, in 1911. Harrington would remain in Graettinger for most of his childhood, growing up on a farm there with seven siblings. Due to financial strains spurred by the Great Depression, Harold and his older brother Elbert alternated years in college so that one could work while the other was in school. Harrington completed two years of college before returning to Graettinger as a high school teacher. He would also coach the school's basketball and football teams. Harrington completed his B.A. in biology in 1927 at Iowa State Teachers College. At the University of Northern Iowa, Harrington completed his M.S. in 1931 and Ph.D. in 1933, both in botany. The same year of his doctorate, he married fellow botanist Edith Jirsa in Waterloo, Iowa.

== Career ==
Harold Harrington accepted a position at the Colorado Agricultural College (now Colorado State University) in Fort Collins, Colorado, where he taught taxonomy. He worked as assistant to Ernest Charles Smith, the curator of the college's herbarium. Harrington then taught at the Chicago Teachers College (now Chicago State University) before returning to Colorado A&M in 1943 to become the curator of its herbarium – a position he would hold for 25 years – and a professor of botany.

Whereas his mentor Smith had been concerned primarily with collecting willow specimens, Harrington eventually contributed approximately 6,200 specimens to CSU's herbarium. While he did not collect to describe new species, he would identify unusual examples and submit them to the relevant experts. One such collection, made in June 1951, resulted the identification of a new Penstemon species, which was named for him. Other collections were submitted to him from various people – including, according to his obituary in the Colorado Native Plant Society Newsletter, "extension agents, farmers, ranchers, [and] elementary school pupils" – for whom Harrington sought to identify their collections.

In 1954, Harrington's Manual of the Plants of Colorado was published after years of research. The production of such a flora had been the reason Harrington was brought to Colorado in 1943. This was the first comprehensive account of the state's flora of since the 1906 Flora of Colorado by Per Axel Rydberg. Harrington's book remains an authoritative text on Colorado's flora and one in 30 of its entries were the first time a plant was recorded in the state. In order to make the text affordable to students, the book was self-published. Edith, who aided in collecting specimens and preparing her husband's publications, hand-typed the 1954 book and called it her "small way" of helping.

Harrington ultimately published 17 books while working at CSU. These included collaborations with the Japanese illustrator Y. Matsumura on the 1955 The True Aquatic Vascular Plants of Colorado and 1967 Edible Native Plants. The Harringtons also traveled, visiting Europe in 1964 and taking photographs of various plants for educational use back on the Front Range. Their travels led them to visit every state in the continental U.S.

The botanist William Alfred Weber wrote that Harrington "was a large person, very quiet and even-tempered, not terribly outgoing, but someone one could be comfortable with". During trips to collect specimens with students, he would play the ukulele at the campfire after the day's work. He could also play the Spanish guitar and violin, the latter of which he had taught himself to play while in college and had played to supplement his income while in school. Harrington was also a poet and included one of his poems in the introduction to his final book.

== Later life and death ==
In 1968, Harrington retired as professor emeritus. He continued writing on botany, publishing Western Edible Wild Plants in 1972 and his final work, How to Identify Grasses and Grasslike Plants, in 1977. He and his wife performed a final round trip through the Colorado Rockies during the summer of 1980. The same year, the couple visited a variety of Pacific islands, including Hawai'i, and Australia. Harold Harrington died on January 22, 1981.

== Legacy ==
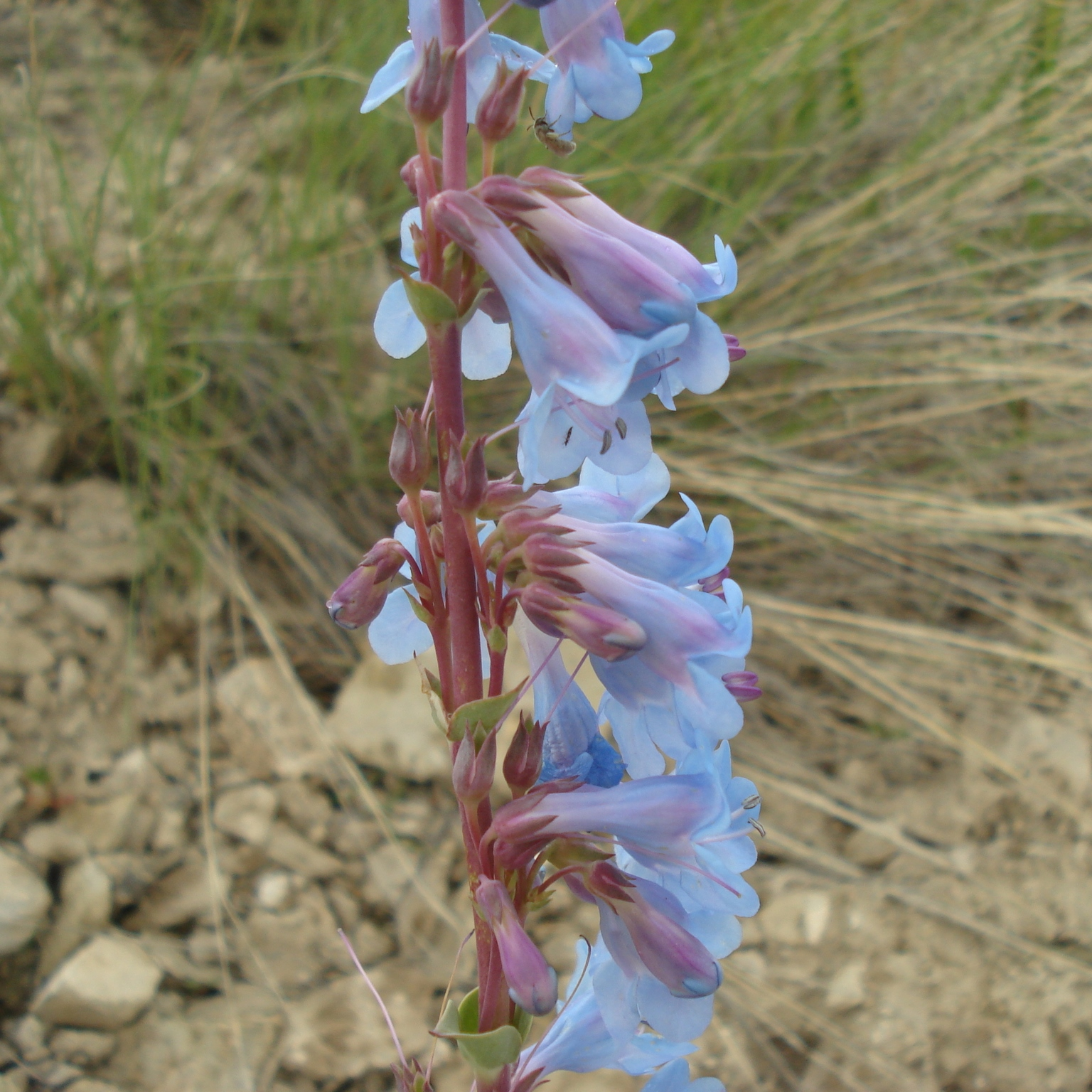
Penstemon harringtonii is named for Harrington, who collected the first specimen of the species.

Two species of flowering plants endemic to Colorado are named for Harrington: Oenothera harringtonii and Penstemon harringtonii. In the case of P. harringtonii, Harrington was credited with the first collection of the species when it was first described by C. William T. Penland in 1958. Penland pointed to a specimen Harrington collected in Routt County, Colorado, on June 7, 1951, as the first of two collections of the species that month.

Harrington's collection of roughly 10,000 specimens remains part of the Charles Mauer Herbarium at CSU. Edith created the Harold David Harrington Graduate Fellowship at CSU in his memory to fund students in the field of plant taxonomy. Charles Maurer, for whom the herbarium was renamed in 2018, was a student of Harrington – who Maurer found "a large, gentle man who was easy to talk to". Maurer recalled using Harrington's Manual of the Plants of Colorado as a textbook. Maurer helped fund the publication Flora of Colorado by Jennifer Ackerfield, the CSU herbarium's curator. The 2015 book features a biography of Harrington.

Harrington's coworker Dieter H. Wilken wrote an obituary for Harrington in 1982, recalling his "kindness, sensitivity", and regular visits to the CSU to discuss unexplored and undocumented aspects of Colorado's flora. In 1991, the botanist James L. Reveal identified Harrington as part of a tradition of botanists collecting specimens in the Colorado Rockies from Thomas Say and Edwin James on Long's Expedition of 1820 through to Weber that saw the region cease to be a "botanical frontier".

== Selected bibliography ==
- Woody Plants of Iowa in Winter Condition (PDF). Studies in Natural History. Iowa City, IA: University of Iowa. June 1, 1934.
- Manual of the Plants of Colorado (2nd ed.). Denver: Sage Books. 1964.
- The True Aquatic Vascular Plants of Colorado. Technical Bulletin. Vol. 57. Fort Collins, Colorado: Colorado Agricultural Experiment Station. March 1955.
