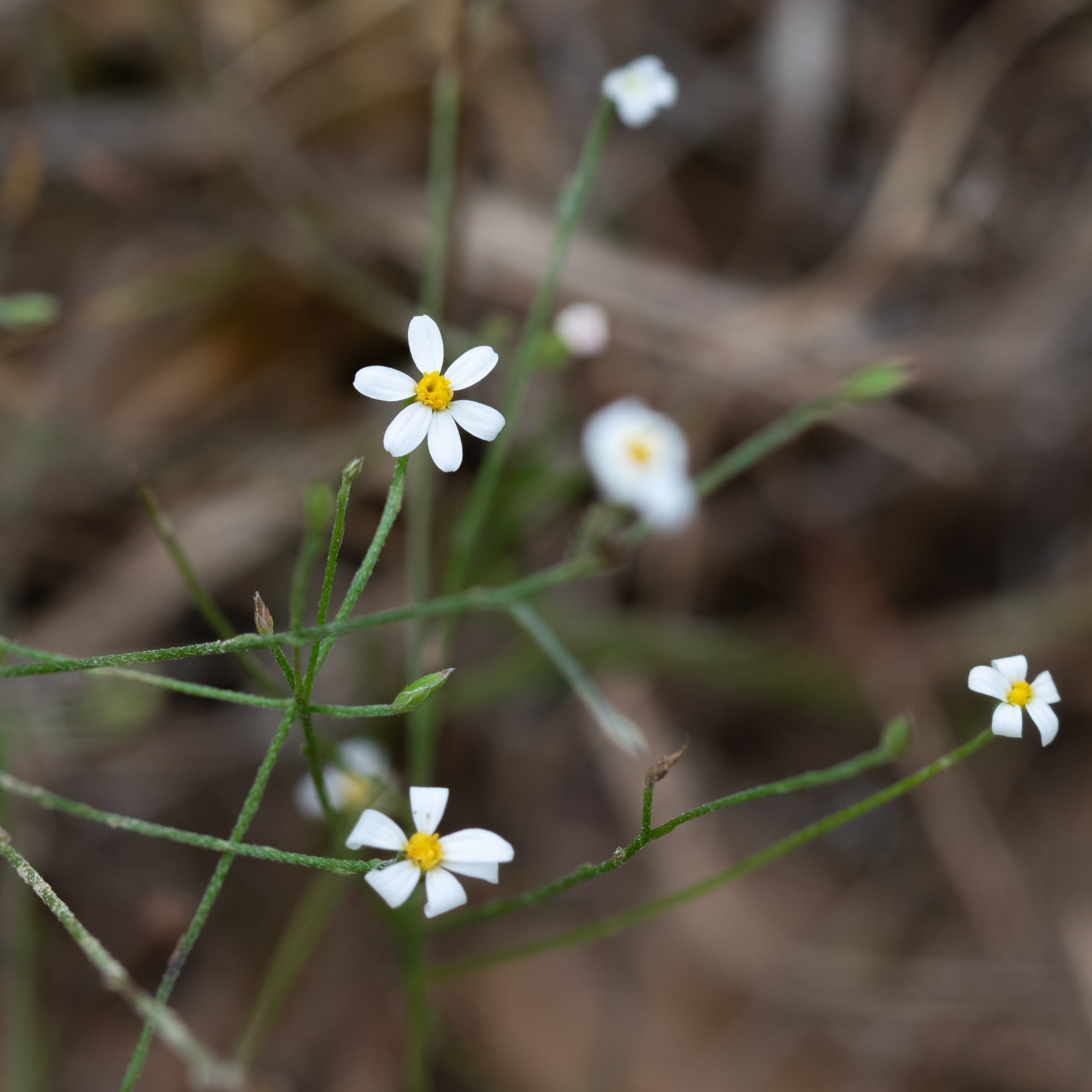

Scientific classification
- Kingdom: Plantae
- Clade: Tracheophytes
- Clade: Angiosperms
- Clade: Eudicots
- Clade: Asterids
- Order: Asterales
- Family: Asteraceae
- Genus: Chaetopappa
- Species: C. asteroides

Binomial name
- Chaetopappa asteroides (Nutt.) DC.

Synonyms
- Chaetanthera asteroides Nutt.; Chaetaphora asteroides (Nutt.) Nutt. ex Nutt.; Diplostelma filiformis Raf.; Diplostelma pumila Raf.; Diplostelma radians Raf.; Distasis asterodes (DC.) Kuntze; Chaetopappa modesta (DC.) A.Gray, syn of var. grandis; Diplostelma bellidioides A.Gray, syn of var. grandis; Distasis modesta DC., syn of var. grandis

= Chaetopappa asteroides =

Species of flowering plant

Chaetopappa asteroides, commonly known as the tiny lazy daisy, or Arkansas leastdaisy, is a North American species of plants in the family Asteraceae. It is native to the southern Great Plains of the United States (Kansas, Oklahoma, Texas, Louisiana, Missouri, Arkansas) as well as to northeastern Mexico (Tamaulipas, Hidalgo).

Varieties

- Chaetopappa asteroides var. asteroides - most of species range
- Chaetopappa asteroides var. grandis Shinners - Río Grande Valley in Texas
