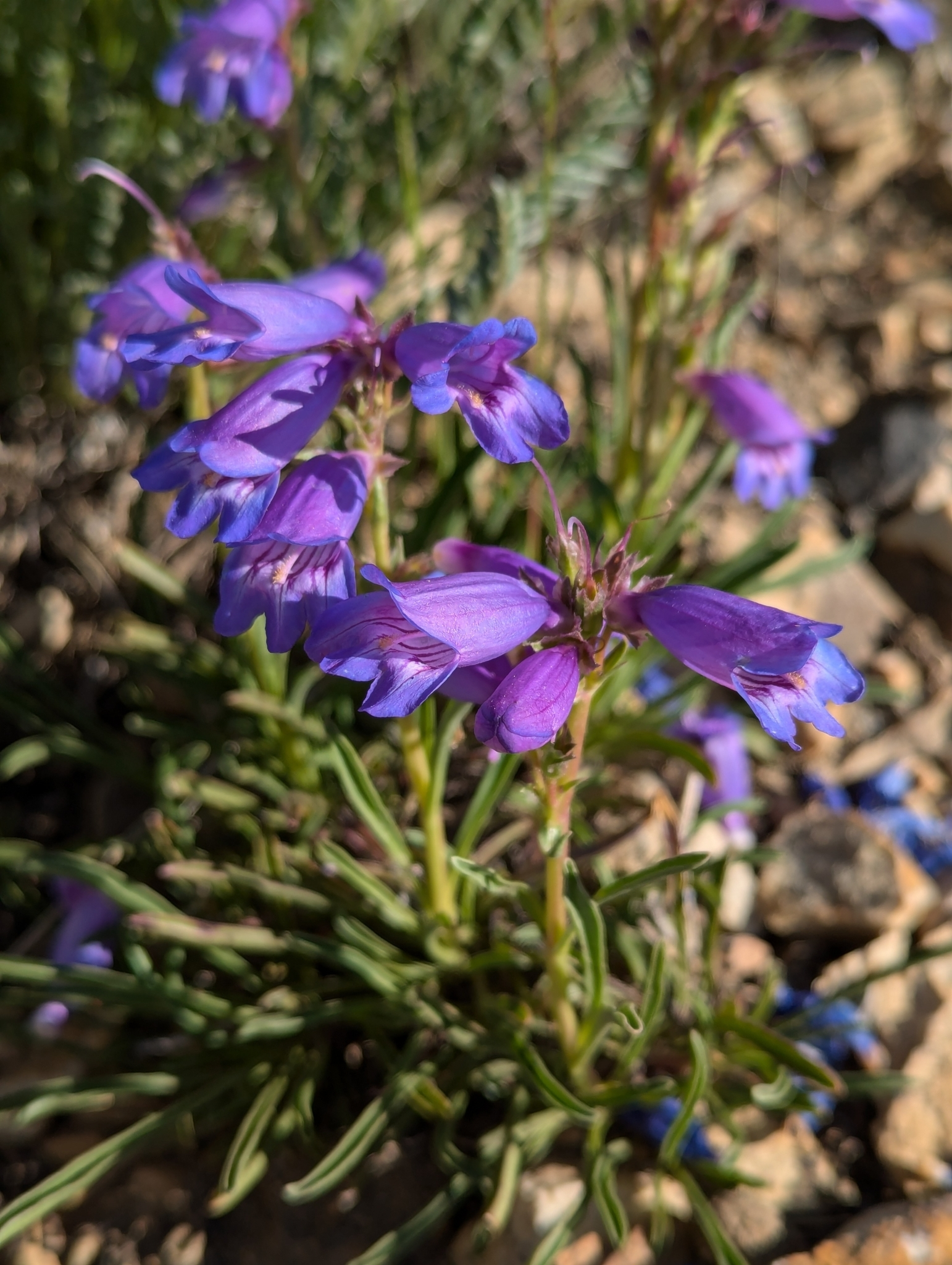
- In the San Isabel National Forest

Conservation status
- Vulnerable (NatureServe)

Scientific classification
- Kingdom: Plantae
- Clade: Tracheophytes
- Clade: Angiosperms
- Clade: Eudicots
- Clade: Asterids
- Order: Lamiales
- Family: Plantaginaceae
- Genus: Penstemon
- Species: P. hallii

Binomial name
- Penstemon hallii A.Gray

Synonyms
- Penstemon bakeri Greene

= Penstemon hallii =

Plant species in the veronica family

Penstemon hallii, commonly Hall's penstemon or Halls alpine penstemon, is an alpine plant that is native to just the Southern Rocky Mountains of Colorado. It has showy flowers in shades of blue or purple the appear in summer.

== Description ==
Hall's penstemon is modest sized plant with stems that are 7 to 25 centimeters (2.8 to 9.8 in) tall, but most often 9–16 cm (3.5–6.3 in). It is relatively long-lived for a penstemon with somewhat woody bases to its stems. The stems can grow straight upward or outward before curving to upright and might have glandular hairs towards the ends, but are otherwise hairless and not glaucus. At times the plant will grow into a mat.

The basal leaves, those growing directly from the base of the plant, might be smaller or missing entirely, but also can be noticeably larger than those higher up on the plant. The basal leaves and the lower leaves on the stems measure 1.6–8.5 cm long and just 3–9 millimeters wide. They are spatulate to lanceolate, shaped like a spoon or the head of spear, with a tapering base. The tip of the leaves is variable, rounded, with a wide point, or a narrow one, and have no teeth on the edges. Each stem has two to four pairs of leaves attached on opposite sides. The upper ones measure 2.4–5.5 cm long and 2–5 mm wide. All the leaves are hairless except for antrorsely-scabrous edges, hairs that are rough and point upwards or forwards.

Blooming occurs in the months of July and August. The inflorescence is the upper part of each stem and is normally 2–7 cm, but can be as short as 1 cm. Many sources state that the flowers all face in one direction, however in the Flora of North America it is reported that the flowers can face in all directions. The flowers are in one to seven groups, formally called verticillasters, with two paired attachment points. Each of the attachment points can have one to four flowers.

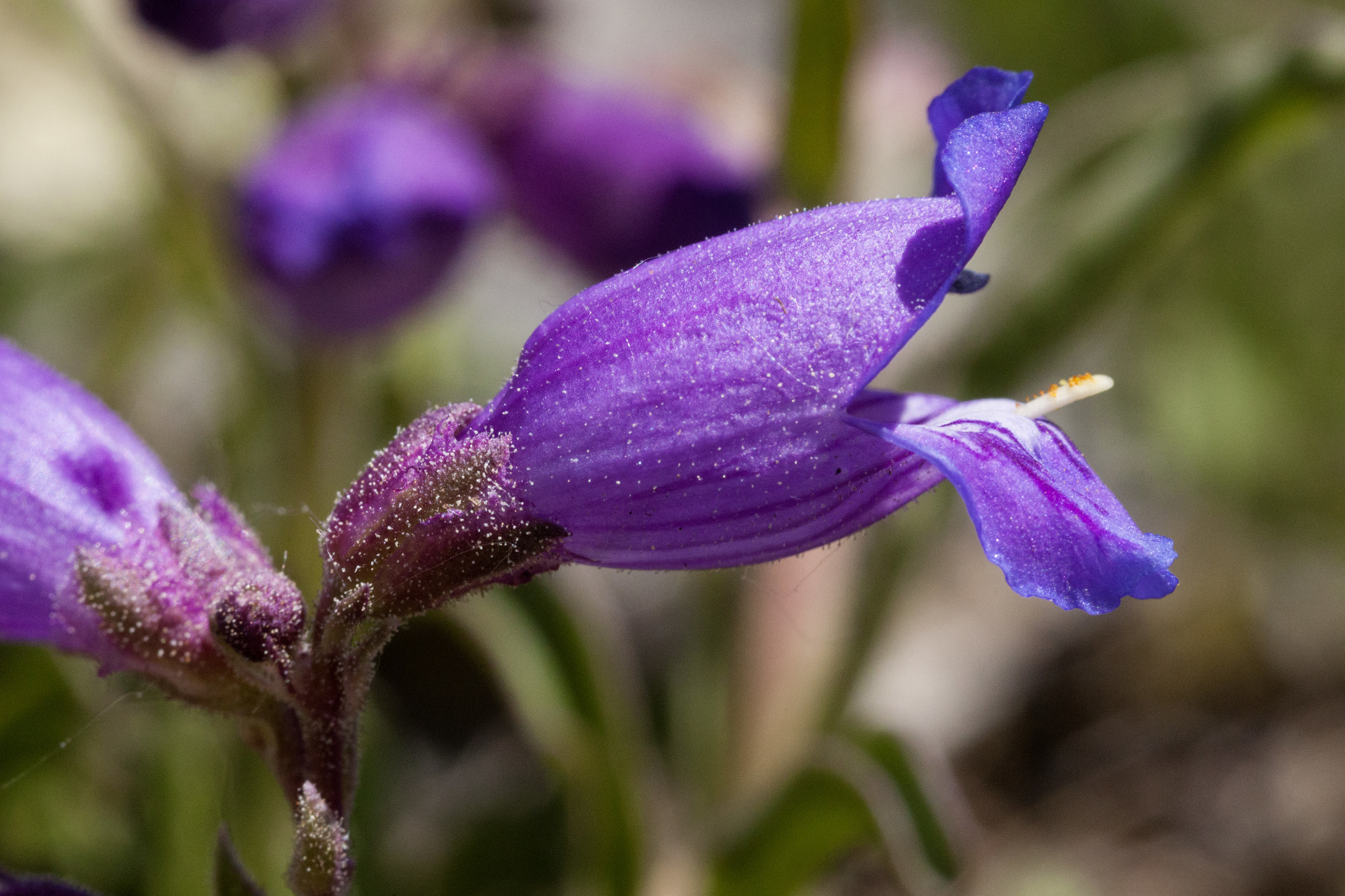
Side view of flower showing glandular surface and inflated tube

The flowers are variable in color, reddish-purple, lilac, somewhat pink, or pale blue, with reddish-purple floral guide lines and sticky glandular hairs on the exterior. They resemble two lipped bell flowers with their abruptly inflated throats. Overall they measure 1.4–2.5 cm long with the mouth having a diameter of 6–7 mm. The stamens do not extend out of the flower, but the sterile staminode often extends out of the mouth, with a length of 10–15 mm. The staminode is moderately to densely covered in golden-yellow hairs.

The fruit is a capsule that is 6–9 mm long and 4–7 mm wide.

The flowers resemble those of grayleaf creeping penstemon (Penstemon teucrioides), another Colorado mountain penstemon species. However, it generally is found under timberline and has hairy, but not glandular, leaves and stems unlike the nearly hairless leaves of Hall's penstemon.

== Taxonomy ==
In 1862 Penstemon hallii was scientifically described and named by botanist Asa Gray. It is classified in the Penstemon genus within the family Plantaginaceae. It has one heterotypic synonym, Penstemon bakeri, which was named in 1901 by Edward Lee Greene. It has no accepted varieties. According to a study of Penstemon genetics published in 2016 it is part of a small group of closely related species including upland penstemon (Penstemon saxosorum) and Penstemon mensarum.

=== Names ===
Penstemon hallii was named for Elihu Hall, a professional botanical collector who arrived in Colorado in 1862 with Asa Gray who named the species for him, though in first publication the genus was spelled Pentstemon. It is known by several related common names including Hall's penstemon, Halls alpine penstemon, Hall's beardtongue, and Hall's alpine beardtongue.

== Range and habitat ==
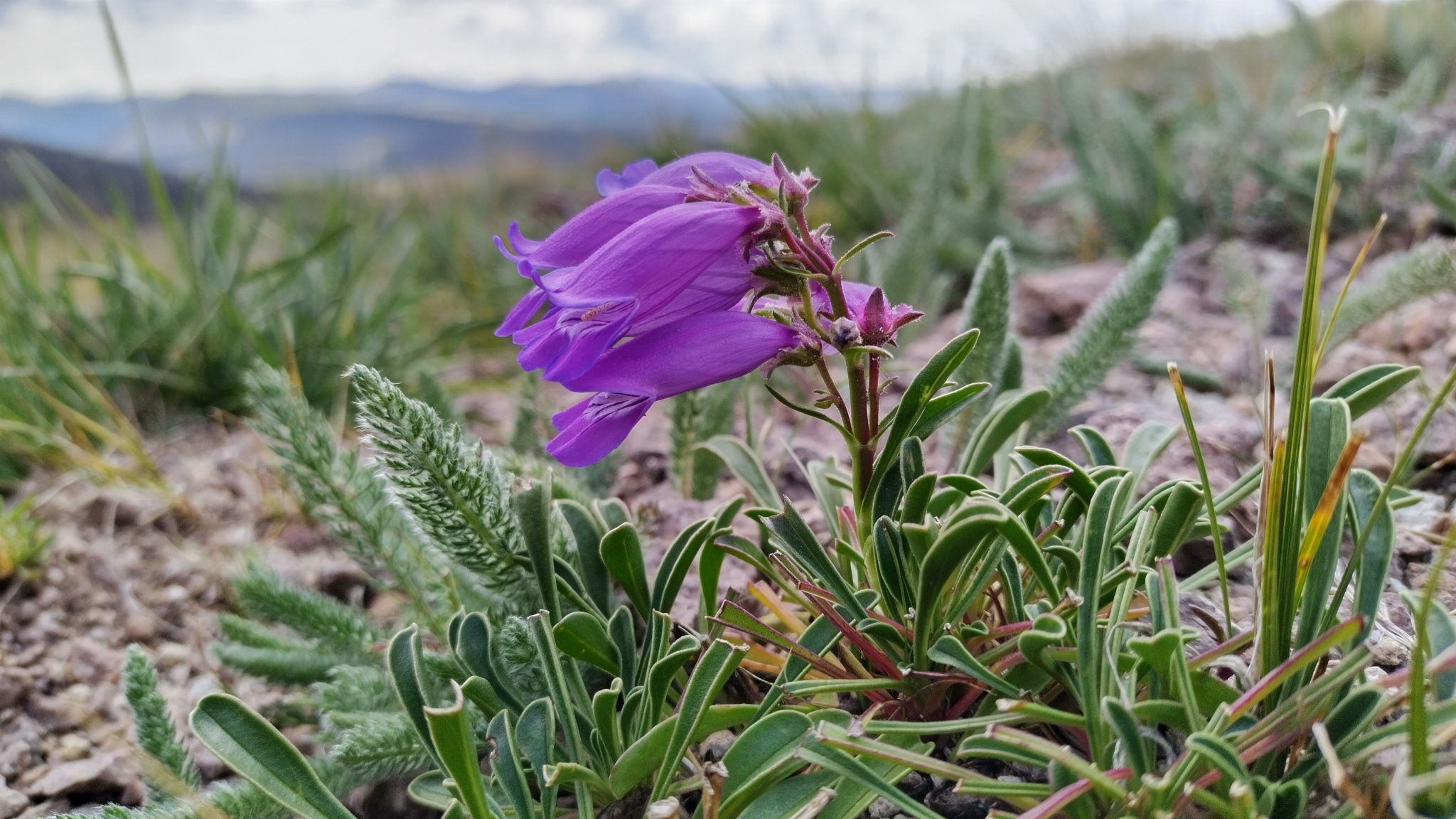
Flowering with mountains in distance, Rio Grande National Forest

Hall's penstemon is endemic to the state of Colorado. It grows in the high mountains of central Colorado as far as Jackson County in the north of the state southwards nearly to New Mexico in Conejos and Archuleta counties. They are found at elevations of 2,800 to 4,000 meters (9,200 to 13,100 ft).

The species is limited to areas of rock or gravel from just under timberline up into the alpine tundra. They might be found in meadows, on rocky slopes, and along ridges.

=== Conservation ===
When NatureServe evaluated the species in 2008 they gave it a rating of vulnerable (G3) due to the risk of habitat loss due to global warming, though it is common in its natural range.

== Uses ==
Hall's penstemons are grown by enthusiasts in rock gardens, alpine garden troughs, and specialized alpine houses. A number of penstemons with similar growth habits such as stiffleaf penstemon (Penstemon aridus) and grayleaf creeping penstemon are similarly grown in troughs. Specialists in alpine gardening regard it as, "Quite showy and not difficult." Though, like other alpine species they require care to ensure their growing substrate drains freely and they remain cool. They are grown in Germany, but only recommended for gardeners with an interest in giving the plants protection against cold and damp in the winter and a well drained space with a sunny exposure. It is grown from seed or propagated by division of plants in mid-spring, April in the northern hemisphere.

== See also ==
- List of Penstemon species
