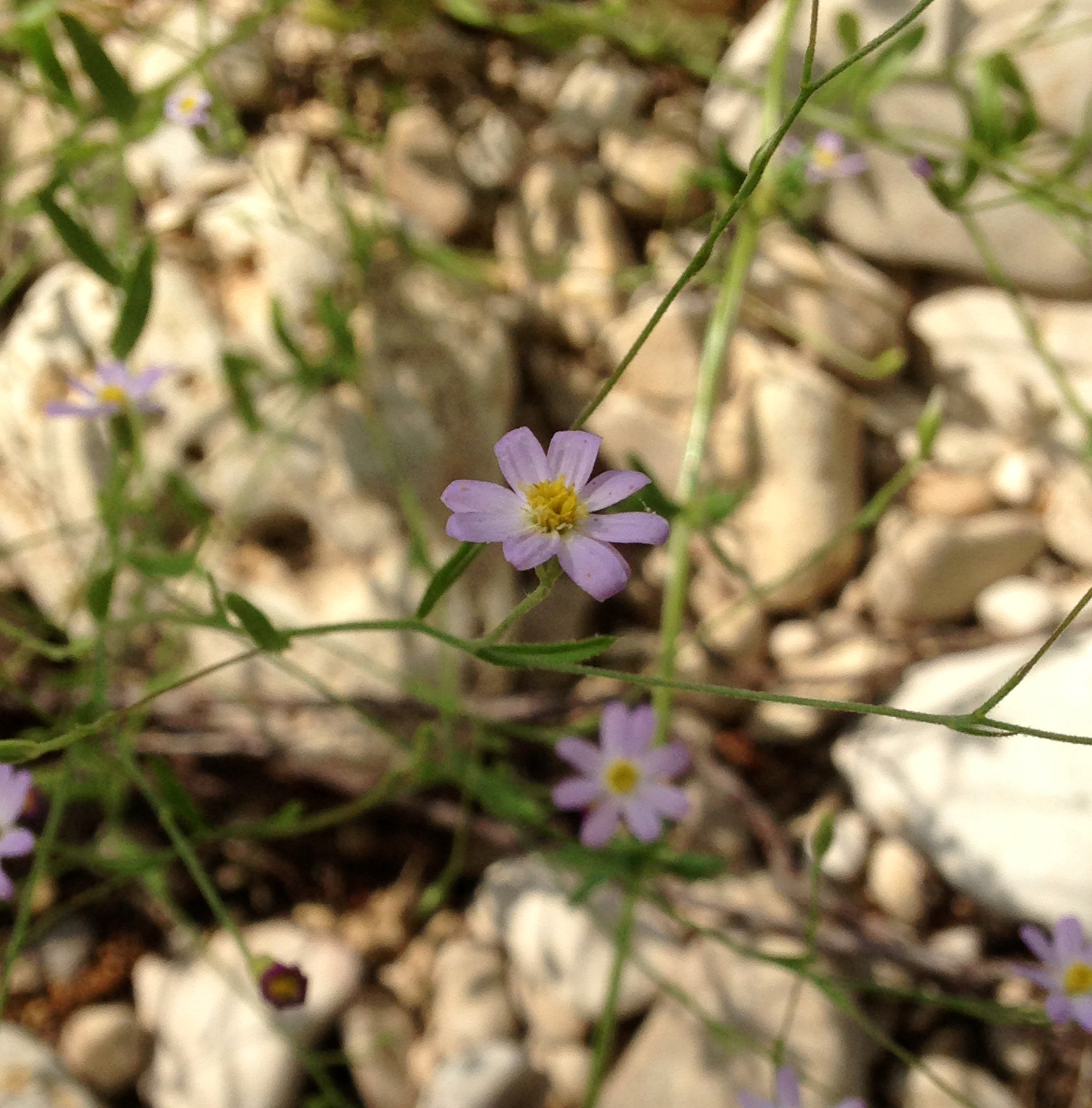

Scientific classification
- Kingdom: Plantae
- Clade: Tracheophytes
- Clade: Angiosperms
- Clade: Eudicots
- Clade: Asterids
- Order: Asterales
- Family: Asteraceae
- Genus: Chaetopappa
- Species: C. bellidifolia

Binomial name
- Chaetopappa bellidifolia (A.Gray & Engelm. ex A.Gray & Engelm.) Shinners

Synonyms
- Bourdonia bellidifolia (A.Gray & Engelm.) Greene; Keerlia bellidifolia A.Gray & Engelm. ex A.Gray & Engelm.

= Chaetopappa bellidifolia =

Species of flowering plant

Chaetopappa bellidifolia , called the Edwards lazy daisy, or whiteray leastdaisy, is a North American species of plants in the family Asteraceae. It has been found only in central Texas, largely in the Edwards Plateau.

It is typically found in open calcareous areas, in habitats such as stream bottoms and hillsides.
