= Chaetopappa bellioides =

Scientific classification
- Kingdom: Plantae
- Clade: Tracheophytes
- Clade: Angiosperms
- Clade: Eudicots
- Clade: Asterids
- Order: Asterales
- Family: Asteraceae
- Genus: Chaetopappa
- Species: C. bellioides

Binomial name
- Chaetopappa bellioides (A.Gray) Shinners 1946

Synonyms
- Diplostelma bellioides A.Gray 1849

Species of flowering plant

Chaetopappa bellioides, called the pretty lazy daisy, or manyflower leastdaisy, is a North American species of plants in the family Asteraceae. It native to northern Mexico (Aguascalientes, Chihuahua, Coahuila, Durango, Nuevo León, San Luis Potosí, Tamaulipas, Zacatecas) and to the Rio Grande Valley in western and southern Texas.
