= Chaetopappa pulchella =

Scientific classification
- Kingdom: Plantae
- Clade: Tracheophytes
- Clade: Angiosperms
- Clade: Eudicots
- Clade: Asterids
- Order: Asterales
- Family: Asteraceae
- Genus: Chaetopappa
- Species: C. pulchella

Binomial name
- Chaetopappa pulchella Shinners

Species of flowering plant

Chaetopappa pulchella is a North American species of plants in the family Asteraceae. It found only in the State of (Coahuila in northern Mexico.

Chaetopappa pulchella grows on the bottoms of canyons and ravines in the Chihuahuan Desert. It is a small plant rarely more than 7 cm (2.8 inches) tall though possessing a taproot and hence perhaps capable of surviving inhospitable seasons to act as a perennial. Flower heads have lavender ray florets and yellow disc florets.
