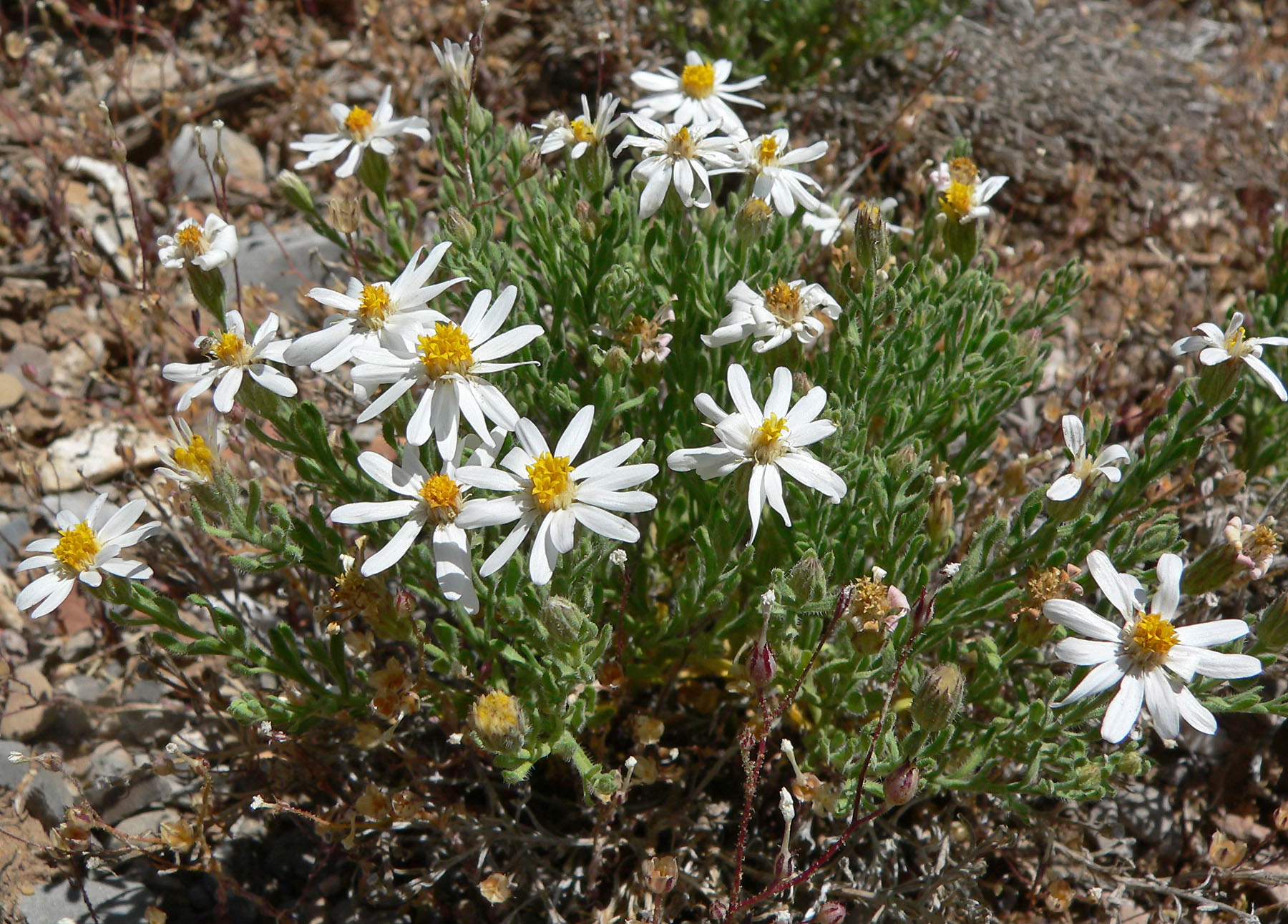
- Chaetopappa ericoides

Scientific classification
- Kingdom: Plantae
- Clade: Embryophytes
- Clade: Tracheophytes
- Clade: Spermatophytes
- Clade: Angiosperms
- Clade: Eudicots
- Clade: Asterids
- Order: Asterales
- Family: Asteraceae
- Subfamily: Asteroideae
- Tribe: Astereae
- Subtribe: Chaetopappinae
- Genus: Chaetopappa; DC.

Synonyms
- Aphantochaeta A.Gray; Diplostelma A.Gray; Leucelene Greene; Asteridium Engelm. ex Walp.; Chaetanthera Nutt. 1834, illegitimate homonym not Ruiz & Pav. 1794; Distasis DC.; Chaetaphora Nutt. ex DC., as synonym; Diplostelma Raf.; Bourdonia Greene

= Chaetopappa =

Genus of flowering plants

Chaetopappa is a genus of plants in the family Asteraceae which are known generally as leastdaisies.

These wildflowers are native to western and central North America. The flower heads bear daisies with curled ray florets which may be white to shades of blue and purple, surrounding yellow disc florets.

Species

- Chaetopappa asteroides - Arkansas leastdaisy - Texas Oklahoma Kansas Missouri Arkansas Louisiana South Carolina Tamaulipas San Luis Potosí Veracruz Hidalgo
- Chaetopappa bellidifolia - whiteray leastdaisy - Texas
- Chaetopappa bellioides - manyflower leastdaisy - Texas New Mexico Aguascalientes, Chihuahua, Coahuila, Durango, Nuevo León, San Luis Potosí, Tamaulipas, Zacatecas
- Chaetopappa effusa - spreading leastdaisy - Texas
- Chaetopappa ericoides - rose heath - California Nevada Arizona Utah New Mexico Colorado Wyoming Texas Oklahoma Kansas Nebraska Chihuahua Coahuila Sonora Durango Nuevo León
- Chaetopappa hersheyi - Guadalupe leastdaisy - Texas New Mexico
- Chaetopappa imberbis - awnless leastdaisy - Texas
- Chaetopappa parryi - Parry's leastdaisy - Texas Coahuila, Nuevo León, San Luis Potosí, Tamaulipas
- Chaetopappa plomoensis - Coahuila
- Chaetopappa pulchella - Coahuila
