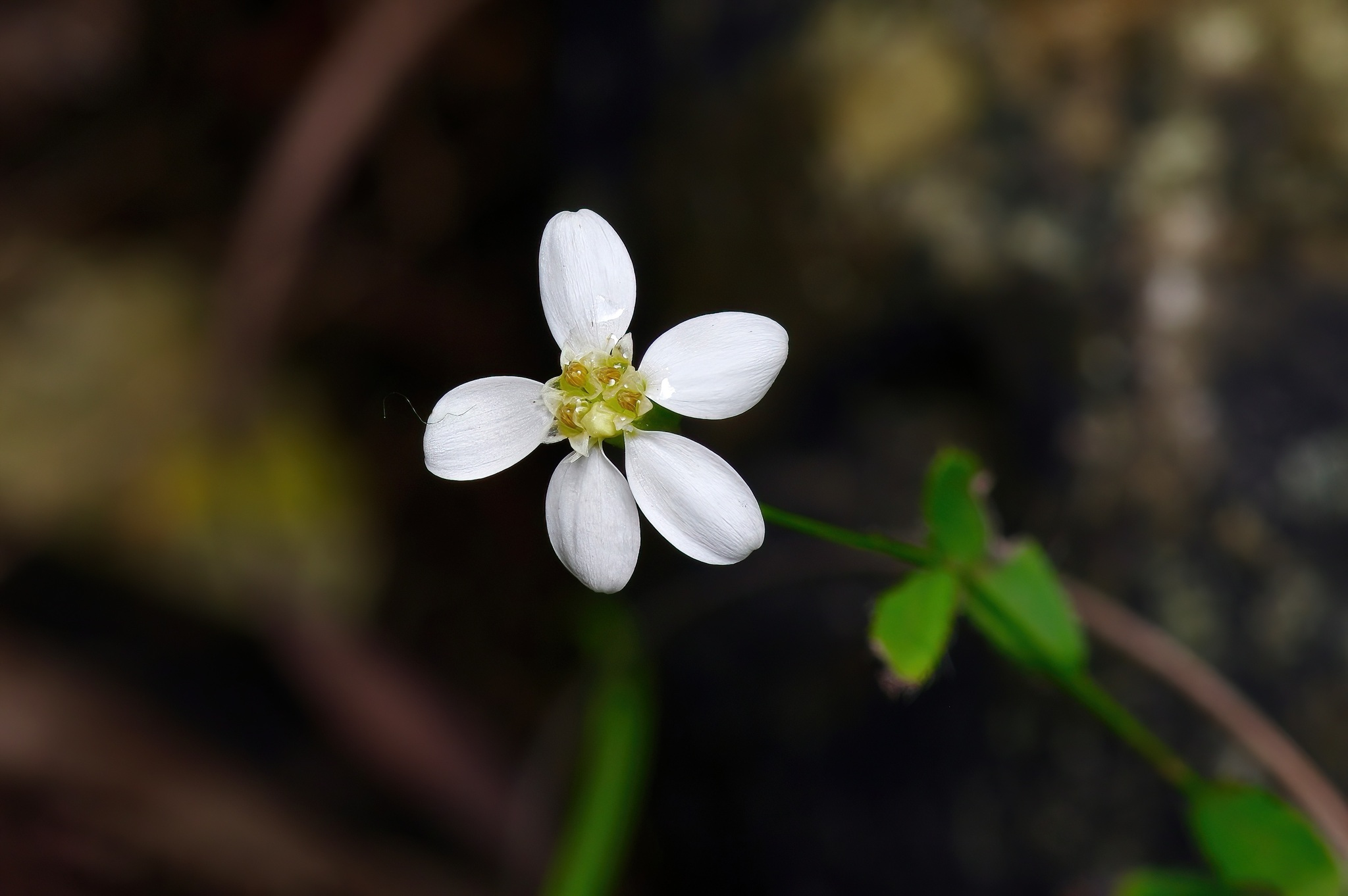

Scientific classification
- Kingdom: Plantae
- Clade: Tracheophytes
- Clade: Angiosperms
- Clade: Eudicots
- Clade: Asterids
- Order: Asterales
- Family: Asteraceae
- Genus: Chaetopappa
- Species: C. effusa

Binomial name
- Chaetopappa effusa (A.Gray) Shinners

Synonyms
- Bourdonia effusa (A.Gray) Greene; Keerlia effusa A.Gray

= Chaetopappa effusa =

Species of flowering plant

Chaetopappa effusa, called the spreading lazy daisy, or spreading leastdaisy, is a North American species of plants in the family Asteraceae. It has been found only in Texas, largely on the Edwards Plateau.
