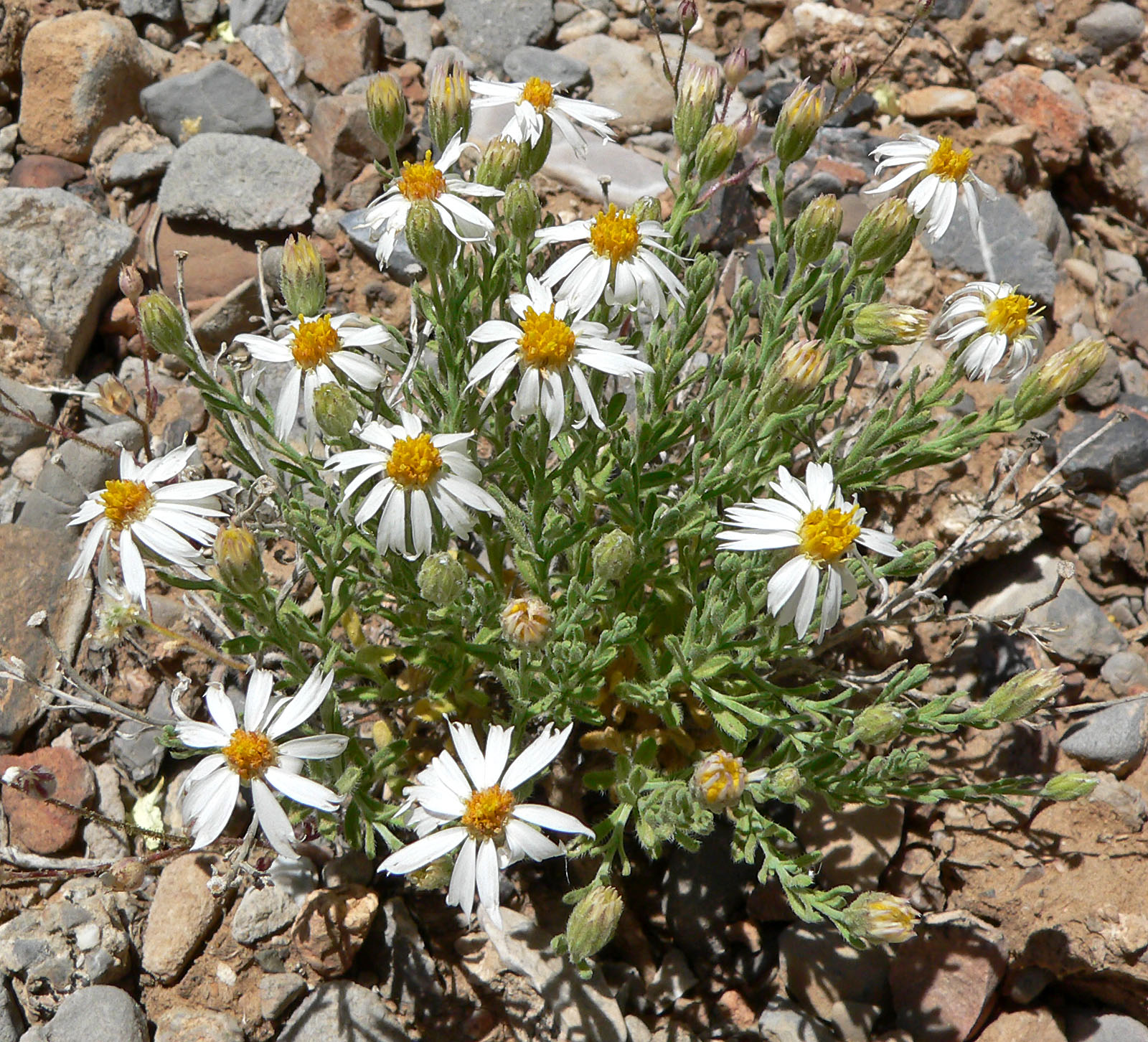

Conservation status
- Secure (NatureServe)

Scientific classification
- Kingdom: Plantae
- Clade: Tracheophytes
- Clade: Angiosperms
- Clade: Eudicots
- Clade: Asterids
- Order: Asterales
- Family: Asteraceae
- Genus: Chaetopappa
- Species: C. ericoides

Binomial name
- Chaetopappa ericoides (Torr.) G.L.Nesom

Synonyms
- Synonymy: Aster arenosus (A.Heller) S.F.Blake; Aster ericifolius Rothr. 1877 not Forssk. 1775; Aster hirtifolius S.F.Blake; Aster leucelene S.F.Blake; Diplopappus ericoides (Torr.) Torr. & A.Gray 1841 not Less. 1831; Diplopappus ericoides var. hirtellus A.Gray; Inula ericoides Torr.; Leucelene ericoides (Torr.) Greene

= Chaetopappa ericoides =

Species of flowering plant

Chaetopappa ericoides is a species of flowering plant in the family Asteraceae known by the common names rose heath and heath-leaved chaetopappa. It is native to the southwestern and western Great Plains regions of the United States, plus northern Mexico. It is found in California, Nevada, Arizona, Utah, New Mexico, Colorado, Wyoming, Texas, Oklahoma, Kansas, Nebraska, Chihuahua, Coahuila, Sonora, Durango, Zacatecas, San Luis Potosí, and Nuevo León.

Chaetopappa ericoides is a petite perennial herb reaching heights between 5 and 15 centimeters (2–6 inches). The hairy, glandular stem grows from a woody caudex and branches several times. The green leaves are up to about a centimeter long and are glandular and bristly. The tiny flower head is 1 or 2 centimeters wide with white or pinkish ray florets around a center of yellow disc florets. Each head has a base of pointed purple-tipped greenish phyllaries. The fruit is a hairy, round achene with a bristly white pappus.

== Uses ==
Among the Zuni people, an infusion of whole pulverized plant applied is rubbed on the body for the pain from a cold, swellings, and rheumatism. A warm infusion of the plant is also taken to hasten parturition.
