= Chaetopappa parryi =

Scientific classification
- Kingdom: Plantae
- Clade: Tracheophytes
- Clade: Angiosperms
- Clade: Eudicots
- Clade: Asterids
- Order: Asterales
- Family: Asteraceae
- Genus: Chaetopappa
- Species: C. parryi

Binomial name
- Chaetopappa parryi A.Gray

Synonyms
- Distasis parryi (A.Gray) Kuntze

Species of flowering plant

Chaetopappa parryi, called the Parry's lazy daisy, or Parry's leastdaisy, is a North American species of plants in the family Asteraceae. It is native to northeastern Mexico (Coahuila, Nuevo León, San Luis Potosí, Tamaulipas) and to the Big Bend region of western Texas.
