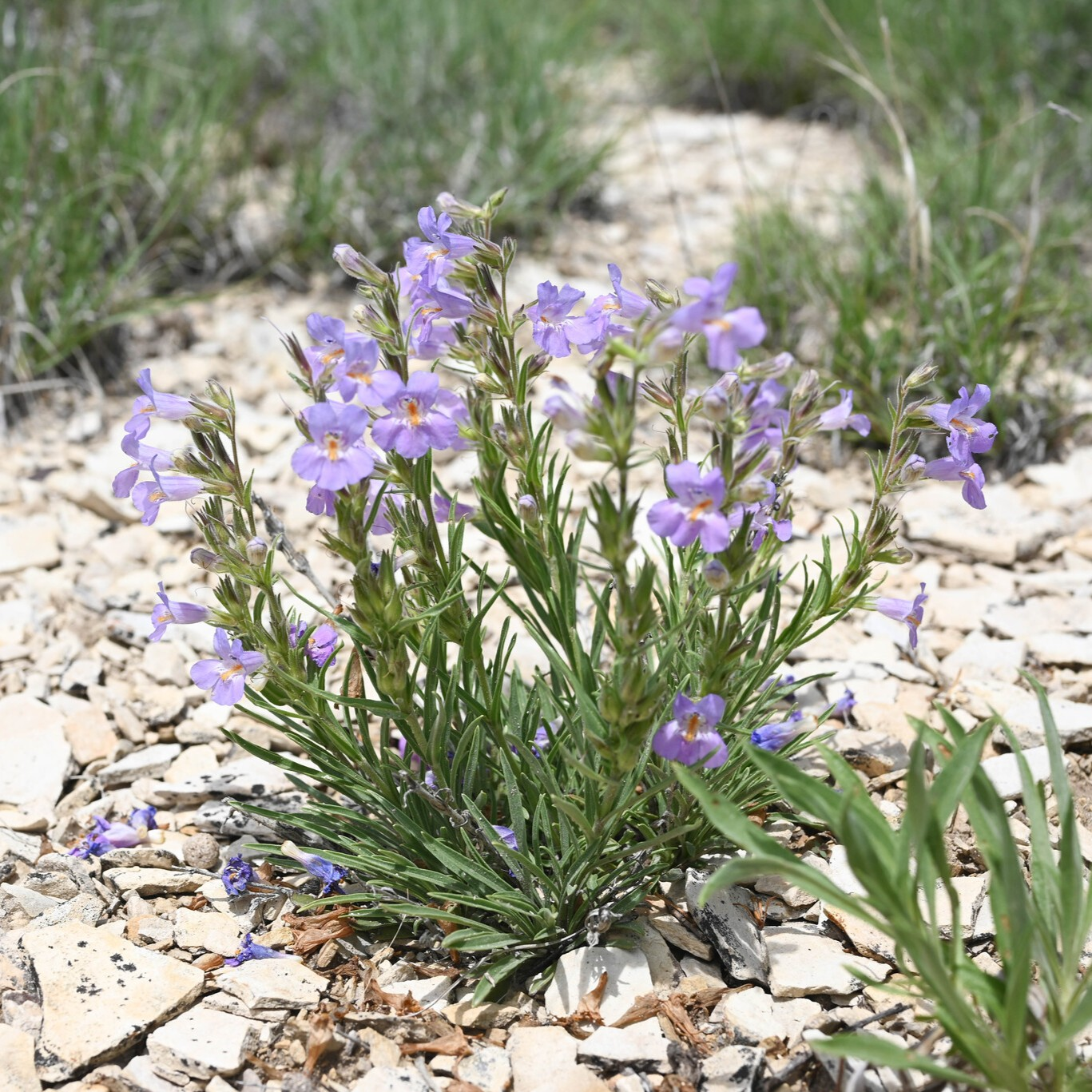
- Lake Pueblo State Park, Colorado

Conservation status
- Apparently Secure (NatureServe)

Scientific classification
- Kingdom: Plantae
- Clade: Tracheophytes
- Clade: Angiosperms
- Clade: Eudicots
- Clade: Asterids
- Order: Lamiales
- Family: Plantaginaceae
- Genus: Penstemon
- Species: P. auriberbis

Binomial name
- Penstemon auriberbis Pennell

Synonyms
- Penstemon parviflorus Pennell

= Penstemon auriberbis =

Species of flowering plant

Penstemon auriberbis, commonly known as the Colorado penstemon or Colorado beardtongue, is a species of Penstemon that grows in the shortgrass prairies of southern Colorado and in a few places in northern New Mexico. Although specimens were collected on the 1820 expedition by Stephen H. Long through the area, they were not scientifically described as a separate species until 1920.

== Description ==
Penstemon auriberbis is a perennial herbaceous species that can grow to 35 cm in height, but is most often 10–30 cm tall. The stems have downward facing hairs near the base and are hairy with glands near the end (glandular-pubescent).

Both of the basal leaves lack the leathery texture, smooth surface, or hairs of some other Penstemon species. The basal leaves and the lower leaves on the stem are attached by a short stem to the plant. The leaves have a narrow shape, ranging from blade lanceolate to linear with a tapered base, and are most often 30–60 mm long and 2–5 mm wide, but can be 15–100 mm long or 1–7 mm wide. The edges of the leave are simple, without teeth, and the ends come to a blunt point that can be obtuse or acute in angle.

There are 2–6 pairs of leaves on the lower part of the stems. The upper leaves are sessile, or attached to the stem without a leaf stalk. They are also blade lanceolate to linear with a tapered base, but clasp the stem and are most often 40–80 mm long and 2–7 mm wide, but can be as little as 25 mm in length. They also may have a very slightly toothed edge on the leaves.

=== Flowers ===
Penstemon auriberbis blooms from May to August. The flowering stems can have either a continual or interrupted string of flower clusters that may face every direction or somewhat in one direction. The flowering stem is a thyrse with 3–8 groups of flowers on the stem, with each group containing 2–4 flowers. The bracts near the flowers are linear to lanceolate in shape, 18–100 mm long and 2–12 mm wide. Each flower is supported by an individual short stem (a peduncle or pedicels) that is glandular and hairy.

The flowers have five ovate to lanceolate lobes, two above and three below, each being 7–9 mm by 1–2 mm. The overall shape is the typical penstemon fused funnel shape flower that can be 16–24 mm long, but are more often 18–22 mm. The petals and tube of the flower are gentle shades of violet, lilac, or pinkish blue, with darker magenta or violet nectar guides. The inside of the flower is moderately fuzzy with fine white hairs and is 4–6 mm long. The throat of the flower is not tight and has a diameter of 7–9 mm. The stamens are contained inside the flower tube and have boat shaped (navicular) pollen sacs, which are between 1.2 and 1.5 mm and do not completely split open to release the pollen. The staminode is 13–16 mm long, reaching the opening of the flower or slightly beyond, with a recurved tip covered in dense orange hairs. The style is 11–14 mm long.

The seed capsules are typical of penstemon, four lobed capsules shaped like a teardrop 6–10 mm in length and 3–4 mm in width.

== Taxonomy ==
The naming and scientific description of Penstemon auriberbis was by the botanist Francis W. Pennell in 1920. He recognized that specimens collected by Edwin P. James during the 1820 Long expedition were not the same as the ones then named as Penstemon jamesii.

== Habitat and distribution ==
They grow on the plains of eastern Colorado and northern New Mexico in dry, sandy, sandy-loam, or gravely soils. Penstemon auriberbis grows in shortgrass prairie and in sagebrush shrublands from 1200 to 2500 meters in elevation.

The precise location of all populations in Colorado is disputed, though sources agree that they generally grow south of the division of the watersheds of the Platte River and the Arkansas River. In New Mexico it is a rare plant, only known from two or three counties, with agreement that it occurs in Union County and dispute on if it occurs in Mora or Colfax counties.

== Cultivation ==
The Colorado penstemon has a reputation for being fussy in cultivation, theorized to be due to having precise soil texture and pH requirements, though they are also well regarded for their handsome blooms. In the average European climate, it is most successfully grown in a hothouse to protect it from excessive moisture.

== See also ==
List of Penstemon species
