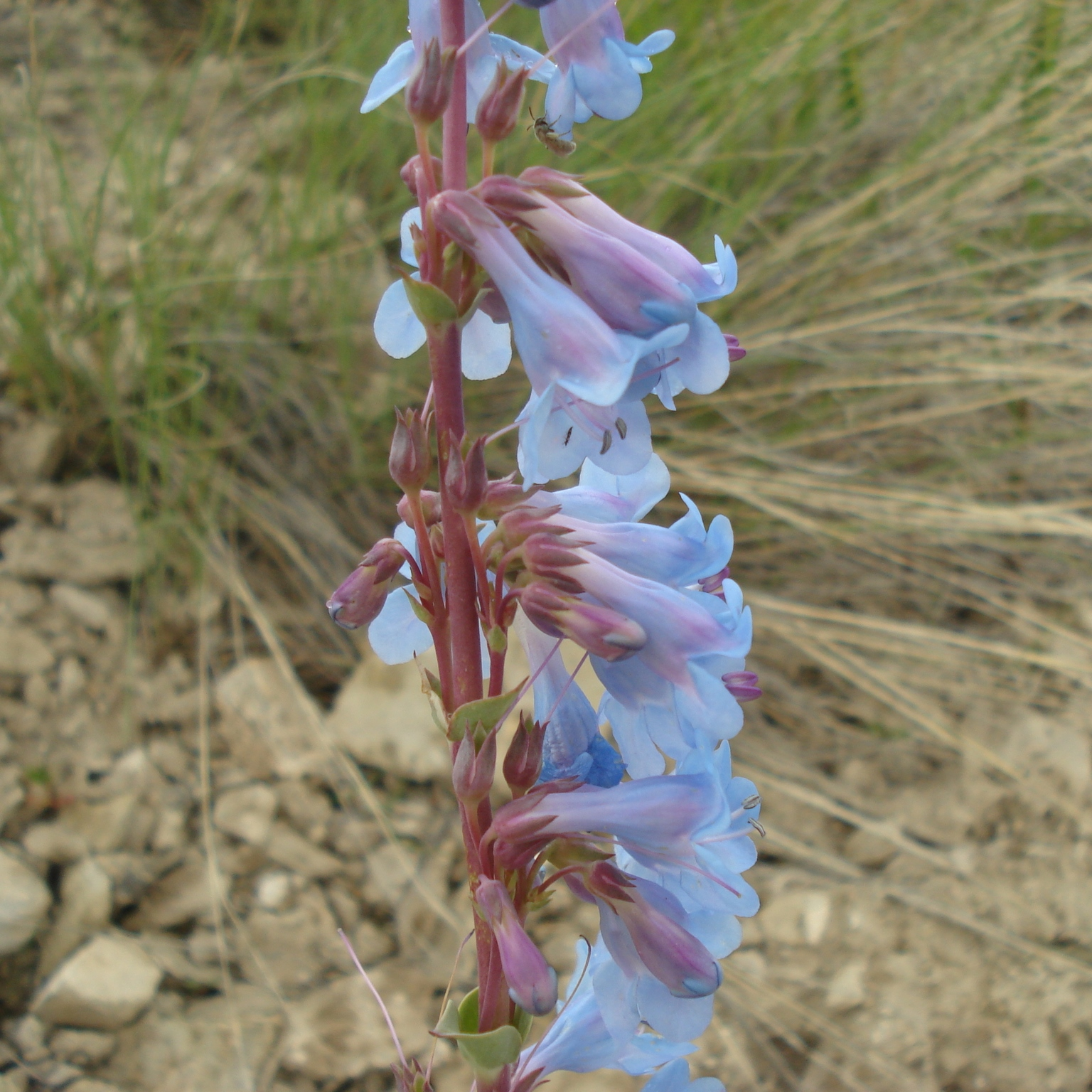
- White River National Forest, Colorado

Conservation status
- Vulnerable (NatureServe)

Scientific classification
- Kingdom: Plantae
- Clade: Tracheophytes
- Clade: Angiosperms
- Clade: Eudicots
- Clade: Asterids
- Order: Lamiales
- Family: Plantaginaceae
- Genus: Penstemon
- Species: P. harringtonii

Binomial name
- Penstemon harringtonii Penland
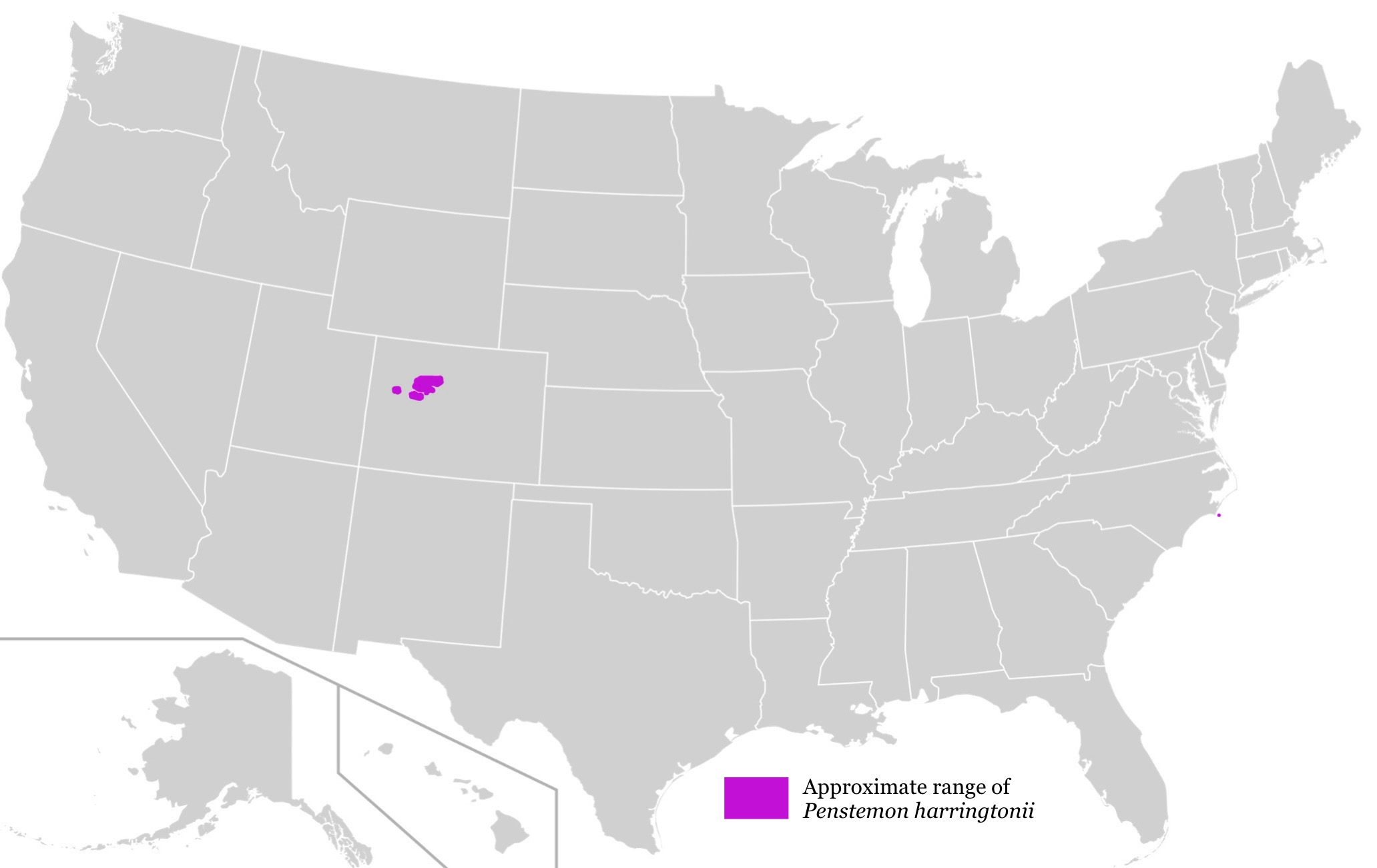
- Approximate range within US

= Penstemon harringtonii =

Species of flowering plant

Penstemon harringtonii, commonly known as Harrington's penstemon and Harrington's beardtongue, is a species of perennial flowering plant in the genus Penstemon in the family Plantaginaceae. P. harringtonii is narrowly endemic to northwestern and north-central Colorado in the United States. It generally populates sandy soil in the arid sagebrush steppe environment. The plant blooms between June and July with pink, blue, and purple flowers. The species is named for the botanist Harold Harrington.

== Description ==
Penstemon harringtonii is a perennial flowering plant that ranges between 30 and 70 centimeters (12 and 28 in) tall. Plants have one or a few stems; each are erect and glabrous, and can be purpleish on their upper portions. A typical plant has a single unbranched stem. Leaves, which are all glabrous, can be basal (growing from the base of the stem) or cauline (growing from further up the stem). The leaves have an ovate or an elliptic shape, ranging between 1.5 cm (0.6 in) and 2.5 cm (1 in) wide and between 5 cm (2 in) and 7 cm (2.8 in) long.

The plants flower between June and July. Flowers are arranged in spikes with bilateral symmetry on the top half of the stem. The flowers on P. harringtonii have distinctive lower pairs of stamen that are exserted (extend beyond the length of the flower tube). Flowers range in color across pink, blue, and purple, with the Flora of North America reporting "corolla blue to violet, lavender, or pinkish blue". Fruiting lasts through late August.

The species is primarily pollinated by leafcutting bees – including at least seven species in the genus Osmia – as well as by pollen wasps. The degree that an individual insect species is responsible for pollinating P. harringtonii varies between occurrence locations and years. P. harringtonii is not pollen-limited.

The lifecycle of the species is not well understood. Seeds from P. harringtonii have been recorded as remaining viable for up to six years within seed banks. Seedlings have been only rarely observed. Plants progress until they produce rosettes, a stage that they remain in for a year or more. After this, plants will mature into flowering adults. The longevity of P. harringtonii is unknown, but adults can persist without any above-ground growth.

== Taxonomy ==
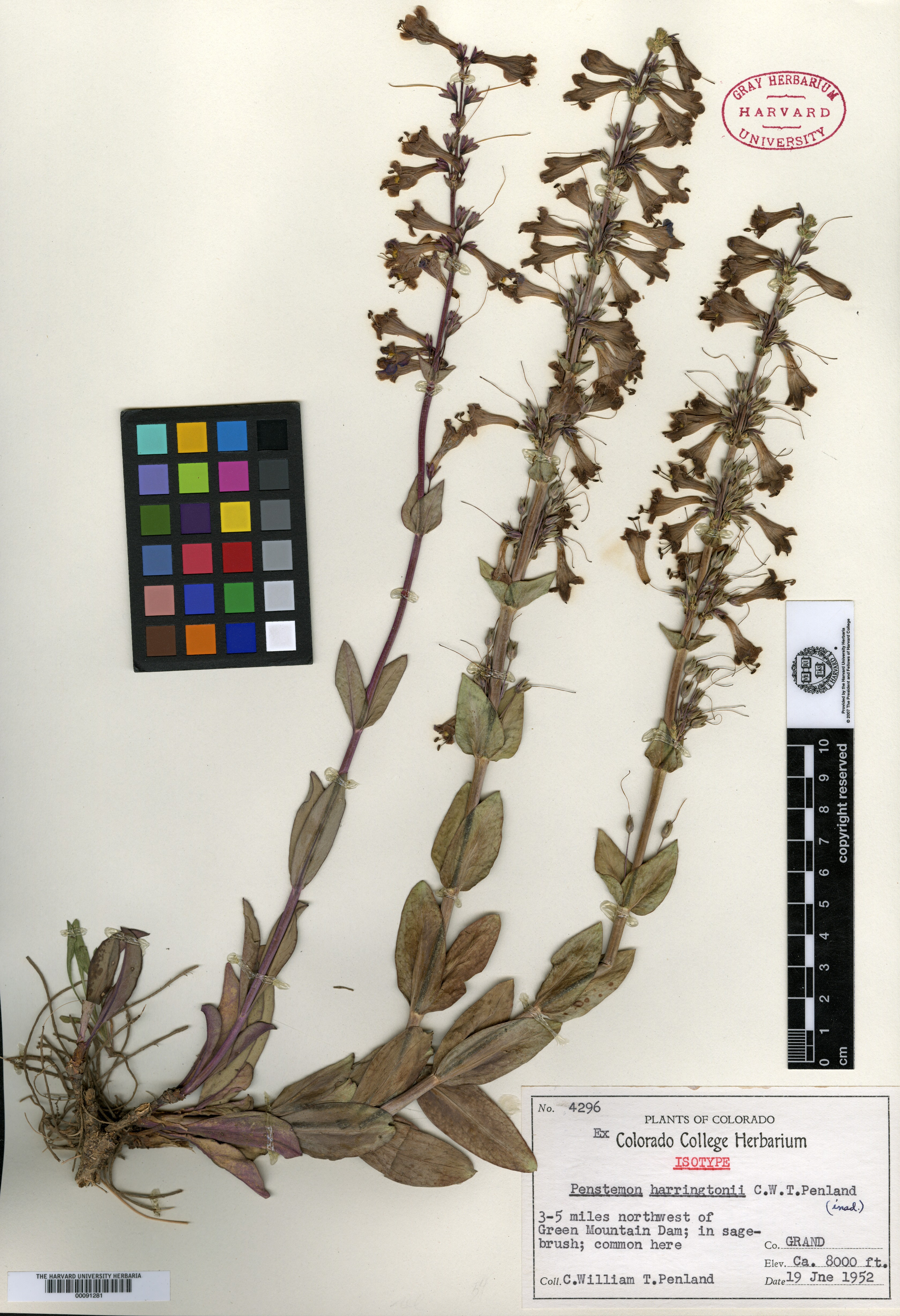
Isotype of Penstemon harringtonii

Penstemon harringtonii was first described in 1958 by C. William T. Penland in the journal Madroño. Penland had discovered the plant in 1952 within 8 kilometers (5 mi) of Green Mountain Reservoir in Grand County, Colorado, and collected a type specimen he would use to describe the species; this specimen is now held at Colorado College's herbarium. Penland reviewed other Penstemon collections and determined that two other specimens of the species had been collected in 1951: Harold Harrington had collected one in Eagle County, Colorado, on June 7, while Mark and Claire Norton had collected a plant in Routt County, Colorado, on June 29. Isotypes are found in other herbariums across the United States.

The genus Penstemon – part of the family Plantaginaceae – contains more than 270 species, making it the largest genus of flowering plants in North America. The genus is divided into subgenera, which are further divided into sections that are themselves sometimes divided into subsections. There are 62 species of Penstemon native to Colorado. P. harringtonii belongs to the subgenus Penstemon, section Courulei (a section with no subsections). The plant's nearest relatives are other species within the section Courulei, such as P. arenicola, P. cyathophorus, and P. secundiflorus.

=== Names ===
Plants in the genus Penstemon are often referred to as beardtongues for their flowers that resemble lips. Penstemon – historically spelled Pentstemon, from the Greek πεντα- (penta-, "five") and στήμων (stḗmōn, "thread" or "stamen") – is a reference to the unusual presence of a fifth stamen in the genus. Penland named the species Penstemon harringtonii for Harrington, a noted Colorado botanist. The species is also commonly known as Harrington's Penstemon and Harrington's beardtongue.

== Distribution ==
Penstemon harringtonii is a species narrowly endemic to northwestern and north-central Colorado in the United States. Its range spans a 132 by 77 kilometers (82 by 48 mi) area on both sides of the Colorado River drainage in the Rocky Mountains. The species prefers sandy soil in the arid sagebrush steppe between elevations of 2,000 and 2,900 meters (6,400 and 9,400 ft). Plants can also be found in pinyon–juniper woodlands. P. harringtonii was recorded as found in Eagle, Grand, Routt, Summit counties in 1988; plants were later also found in Garfield and Pitkin counties. As of 2006, the entire population of an estimated 40,000 to 43,000 individuals was spread across 40 square kilometers (10,000 acres) of occupied habitat. As of 1999, Harrington's beardtongue was observed growing in substantial numbers in the medians of Interstate 70 near Vail, Colorado.

Between the collections in the 1950s and 1982, only one other occurrence location was identified. A 1982 study identified additional occurrences, with subsequent studies and collections identifying further sites where the species occurs. William Alfred Weber and Ronald Wittmann made the sole collection of P. harringtonii at its only known occurrence in Summit County in 1982.

As of 2006, a United States Forest Service-sponsored conservation assessment on the species reported there were 74 known occurrences of P. harringtonii. The majority of individuals were found within 20 of these occurrences, with 19 of these featuring at least 500 individuals. The majority of occurrences had between 20 and 300 plants. While the 2006 study estimated the total species population at between 40,000 and 43,000 plants, it considered a population between 300,000 and 500,000 individuals plausible.

It is unknown if P. harringtonii can only survive in certain geologic substrates or soils. The species typically favors sandy, gritty material in clay loams derived from Pleistocene gravels, limestone, limey shales, and other material. The Niobrara Formation is documented as the parent material for some occurrences.

== Conservation ==
The plant's NatureServe conservation status is G3, meaning Penstemon harringtonii is considered "vulnerable". Prior to 1996, the species was evaluated by the United States Fish and Wildlife Service as a candidate for protection under the Endangered Species Act of 1973 but not listed. As of 2020, P. harringtonii was a Bureau of Land Management special status species, listed as sensitive. The species is not listed on the state-level Colorado Threatened and Endangered List.

The 2006 conservation assessment determined that plant's population had been decreasing in the approximately 140 years since the region was settled and that preceding 25 years had seen a sharper decline coincident with heightened development within the plant's range. Annual population fluctuations were credited with making the analysis of long-term population trends difficult. Colorado State University's Rare Plant Guide assessed the species as slightly to moderately vulnerable to climate change in consideration of the 2025 Colorado State Wildlife Action Plan.

== See also ==
- List of Penstemon species
