= List of international bridges in North America =

An international bridge is a structure that provides transportation across borders. Tourists and cross-border commuters travelling between countries often use these bridges. Such bridges also facilitate international trade. Below is a list of international bridges in North America:

== Canada–United States ==
Countries	Bridge	Description
Canada (New Brunswick); United States (Maine)	Clair–Fort Kent Bridge	A steel truss bridge connecting Clair, New Brunswick, with Fort Kent, Maine.
Canada (New Brunswick); United States (Maine)	Edmundston–Madawaska Bridge	A bridge connecting Edmundston, New Brunswick, with Madawaska, Maine.
Canada (New Brunswick); United States (Maine)	Ferry Point International Bridge	A bridge connecting St. Stephen, New Brunswick, with Calais, Maine.
Canada (New Brunswick); United States (Maine)	Franklin Delano Roosevelt Bridge	A bridge connecting Campobello Island, New Brunswick, with Lubec, Maine.
Canada (New Brunswick); United States (Maine)	International Avenue Bridge	A bridge connecting St. Stephen, New Brunswick, with Calais, Maine.
Canada (New Brunswick); United States (Maine)	Milltown International Bridge	A bridge connecting St. Stephen, New Brunswick, with Calais, Maine.
Canada (New Brunswick); United States (Maine)	Saint Croix–Vanceboro Bridge	A bridge connecting Saint Croix, New Brunswick, with Vanceboro, Maine.
Canada (New Brunswick); United States (Maine)	Saint Croix–Vanceboro Railway Bridge	A railway bridge connecting Saint Croix, New Brunswick, with Vanceboro, Maine.
Canada (New Brunswick); United States (Maine)	Saint Leonard–Van Buren Bridge	A bridge connecting St. Leonard, New Brunswick with Van Buren, Maine.
Canada (Ontario); United States (New York)	Honeymoon Bridge	A defunct bridge connecting Niagara Falls, Ontario, with Niagara Falls, New York.
Canada (Ontario); United States (New York)	International Railway Bridge	A bridge connecting Fort Erie, Ontario, with Buffalo, New York.
Canada (Ontario); United States (New York)	Lewiston–Queenston Bridge	A bridge connecting Lewiston, New York, with Queenston, Ontario.
Canada (Ontario); United States (New York)	Michigan Central Railway Bridge	A defunct railway bridge connecting Niagara Falls, Ontario, with Niagara Falls, New York.
Canada (Ontario); United States (New York)	Niagara Cantilever Bridge	A defunct railway bridge connecting Niagara Falls, Ontario, with Niagara Falls, New York.
Canada (Ontario); United States (New York)	Niagara Clifton Bridge	A defunct suspension bridge connecting Clifton, Ontario, and Niagara Falls, New York.
Canada (Ontario); United States (New York)	Niagara Falls Suspension Bridge	A defunct railway suspension bridge connecting Niagara Falls, Ontario, with Niagara Falls, New York.
Canada (Ontario); United States (New York)	Ogdensburg–Prescott International Bridge	A suspension bridge connecting Johnstown, Ontario with Ogdensburg, New York.
Canada (Ontario); United States (New York)	Peace Bridge	An arch bridge connecting Fort Erie, Ontario, with Buffalo, New York.
Canada (Ontario); United States (New York)	Rainbow Bridge	A steel arch bridge connecting Niagara Falls, Ontario, with Niagara Falls, New York.
Canada (Ontario); United States (New York)	Thousand Islands Bridge	A bridge connecting the Canadian and American portions of Thousand Islands.
Canada (Ontario); United States (New York)	Seaway International Bridge	A bridge connecting Cornwall, Ontario, with Massena, New York.
Canada (Ontario); United States (New York)	Whirlpool Rapids Bridge	A bridge connecting Niagara Falls, Ontario, with Niagara Falls, New York.
Canada (Ontario); United States (Michigan)	Ambassador Bridge	A suspension bridge connecting Windsor, Ontario, with Detroit, Michigan.
Canada (Ontario); United States (Michigan)	Blue Water Bridge	A bridge connecting Point Edward, Ontario, with Port Huron, Michigan.
Canada (Ontario); United States (Michigan)	Gordie Howe International Bridge	A bridge connecting Windsor, Ontario, with Detroit, Michigan.
Canada (Ontario); United States (Michigan)	Sault Ste. Marie International Bridge	A bridge connecting Sault Ste. Marie, Ontario, and Sault Ste. Marie, Michigan.
Canada (Ontario); United States (Michigan)	Sault Ste. Marie International Railroad Bridge	A railway bridge connecting Sault Ste. Marie, Ontario, with Sault Ste. Marie, Michigan.
Canada (Ontario); United States (Minnesota)	Baudette–Rainy River International Bridge	A bridge connecting Rainy River, Ontario, with Baudette, Minnesota.
Canada (Ontario); United States (Minnesota)	Fort Frances–International Falls International Bridge	A bridge connecting Fort Frances, Ontario, with International Falls, Minnesota.
Canada (Quebec); United States (Vermont)	Missisquoi River Bridge	A bridge connecting Sutton, Quebec, with Richford, Vermont.

== Guatemala–Mexico ==
- Puente Rodolfo Robles – A bridge connecting Ayutla, San Marcos, Guatemala, with Ciudad Hidalgo, Chiapas, Mexico.

== Mexico–United States ==
Countries	Bridge	Description
Mexico (Chihuahua); United States (Texas)	Bridge of the Americas	A bridge connecting Ciudad Juárez, Chihuahua, with El Paso, Texas.
Mexico (Chihuahua); United States (Texas)	Fabens–Caseta International Bridge	A bridge connecting Caseta, Chihuahua, with Fabens, Texas.
Mexico (Chihuahua); United States (Texas)	Fort Hancock–El Porvenir International Bridge	A bridge connecting El Porvenir, Chihuahua, with Fort Hancock, Texas.
Mexico (Chihuahua); United States (Texas)	Paso del Norte International Bridge	A bridge connecting Ciudad Juárez, Chihuahua, with El Paso, Texas.
Mexico (Chihuahua); United States (Texas)	Presidio–Ojinaga International Bridge	A bridge connecting Ojinaga, Chihuahua, with Presidio, Texas.
Mexico (Chihuahua); United States (Texas)	Presidio–Ojinaga International Rail Bridge	A bridge connecting Ojinaga, Chihuahua, with Presidio, Texas.
Mexico (Chihuahua); United States (Texas)	Stanton Street Bridge	A bridge connecting Ciudad Juárez, Chihuahua, with El Paso, Texas.
Mexico (Chihuahua); United States (Texas)	Ysleta–Zaragoza International Bridge	A bridge connecting Ciudad Juárez, Chihuahua, with El Paso, Texas.
Mexico (Chihuahua); United States (Texas)	Tornillo–Guadalupe International Bridge	A bridge connecting Guadalupe, Chihuahua, with Tornillo, Texas.
Mexico (Coahuila); United States (Texas)	Camino Real International Bridge	A bridge connecting Piedras Negras, Coahuila, with Eagle Pass, Texas.
Mexico (Coahuila); United States (Texas)	Del Río–Ciudad Acuña International Bridge	A bridge connecting Ciudad Acuña, Coahuila, with Del Rio, Texas.
Mexico (Coahuila); United States (Texas)	Eagle Pass–Piedras Negras International Bridge	A bridge connecting Piedras Negras, Coahuila, with Eagle Pass, Texas.
Mexico (Coahuila); United States (Texas)	La Linda International Bridge	A bridge connecting La Linda, Coahuila, to the Big Bend area of Texas.
Mexico (Coahuila); United States (Texas)	Lake Amistad Dam International Crossing	A bridge connecting Ciudad Acuña, Coahuila, with Del Rio, Texas.
Mexico (Coahuila); United States (Texas)	Union Pacific International Railroad Bridge	A bridge connecting Piedras Negras, Coahuila, with Eagle Pass, Texas.
Mexico (Nuevo León); United States (Texas)	Laredo–Colombia Solidarity International Bridge	A bridge connecting Colombia, Nuevo León, with Laredo, Texas.
Mexico (Tamaulipas); United States (Texas)	Anzalduas International Bridge	A bridge connecting Reynosa, Tamaulipas, with Mission, Texas.
Mexico (Tamaulipas); United States (Texas)	Brownsville & Matamoros International Bridge	A bridge connecting Matamoros, Tamaulipas, with Brownsville, Texas.
Mexico (Tamaulipas); United States (Texas)	Donna–Río Bravo International Bridge	A bridge connecting Río Bravo, Tamaulipas, with Donna, Texas.
Mexico (Tamaulipas); United States (Texas)	Free Trade International Bridge	A bridge connecting Matamoros, Tamaulipas, with Los Indios, Texas.
Mexico (Tamaulipas); United States (Texas)	Gateway International Bridge	A bridge connecting Matamoros, Tamaulipas, with Brownsville, Texas.
Mexico (Tamaulipas); United States (Texas)	Gateway to the Americas International Bridge	A bridge connecting Nuevo Laredo, Tamaulipas, with Laredo, Texas.
Mexico (Tamaulipas); United States (Texas)	Lake Falcon Dam International Crossing	A bridge connecting Nueva Ciudad Guerrero, Tamaulipas, with Falcon Heights, Texas.
Mexico (Tamaulipas); United States (Texas)	McAllen–Hidalgo–Reynosa International Bridge	A bridge connecting Reynosa, Tamaulipas, with Hidalgo and McAllen, Texas.
Mexico (Tamaulipas); United States (Texas)	Pharr–Reynosa International Bridge	A bridge connecting Reynosa, Tamaulipas, with Pharr, Texas.
Mexico (Tamaulipas); United States (Texas)	Progreso–Nuevo Progreso International Bridge	A bridge connecting Nuevo Progreso, Río Bravo, Tamaulipas, with Progreso, Texas.
Mexico (Tamaulipas); United States (Texas)	Rio Grande City–Camargo International Bridge	A bridge connecting Camargo, Tamaulipas, with Rio Grande City, Texas.
Mexico (Tamaulipas); United States (Texas)	Roma–Ciudad Miguel Alemán International Bridge	A bridge connecting Ciudad Miguel Alemán, Tamaulipas, with Roma, Texas.
Mexico (Tamaulipas); United States (Texas)	Texas Mexican Railway International Bridge	A bridge connecting Nuevo Laredo, Tamaulipas, with Laredo, Texas.
Mexico (Tamaulipas); United States (Texas)	Veterans International Bridge at Los Tomates	A bridge connecting Matamoros, Tamaulipas, with Brownsville, Texas.
Mexico (Tamaulipas); United States (Texas)	World Trade International Bridge	A bridge connecting Nuevo Laredo, Tamaulipas, with Laredo, Texas.

== See also ==
- List of international bridges
