= U.S. Route 57 =

Highway in the United States

U.S. Highway 57
- US 57 highlighted in red

Route information
- Maintained by TxDOT
- Length: 98.095 mi (157.869 km)
- Existed: 1970–present

Major junctions
- South end: Fed. 57 at the Mexican border in Eagle Pass
- US 277 in Eagle Pass; US 83 in La Pryor
- North end: I-35 near Moore

Location
- Country: United States
- State: Texas
- Counties: Maverick, Zavala, Frio

Highway system
- United States Numbered Highway System; List; Special; Divided; Highways in Texas; Interstate; US; State; Former; Toll; Loops; Spurs; FM/RM; Park; Rec
← US 56	US	→ US 58
← SH 56	TX	→ SH 57
← SH 75A	SH 76	→ US 77

U.S. Highway 57 (US 57) is a 98-mile (158 km) north–south intrastate United States Highway that follows a nearly east–west route in the southwestern part of the state of Texas. The highway's northern (eastern) terminus is about 50 miles (80 km) south of San Antonio, Texas, between Devine and Pearsall, at an intersection with Interstate 35 (I-35; old US 81). Its southern (western) terminus is in Eagle Pass, at the Rio Grande (Río Bravo), where it continues into Piedras Negras, Coahuila, as Mexican Federal Highway 57.

== Route description ==
US 57 begins at the Eagle Pass–Piedras Negras International Bridge in Eagle Pass. The highway travels eastward through Eagle Pass on Garrison Street. On the east side of town, it turns northeast briefly and intersects US 277 Business on Main Street before turning back to the east. Six blocks later, it reaches the intersection with the main branch of US 277 and FM 3443. US 57 continues east, now concurrent with southbound US 277. About one mile (1.6 km) further, the highways diverge, as US 57 veers to the northeast. The highway travels through ranch land in Maverick County and travels through a United States Border Patrol interior checkpoint before reaching La Pryor, where it intersects US 83. US 57 continues eastward through Batesville and unincorporated areas of Zavala and Frio counties, intersecting several Farm to Market roads, before reaching its eastern terminus at I-35 southwest of the town of Moore.

== History ==
This 98-mile (158 km) highway was originally designated in 1933 as State Highway 76 (SH 76), which was previously designated in 1926 on a route from Nacogdoches to Joaquin which was replaced by SH 7 in 1933. From 1942 to 1964, its eastern half was reassigned to Farm to Market Road 394 (FM 394). In 1966, the state changed the highway's number to 57 to provide continuity with Mexican Federal Highway 57, a similarly-numbered route across the Mexican border.

In 1970, the highway was commissioned as a United States Highway, and retained its "57" designation to create a single-numbered international corridor. The highway is signed south–north, even though it travels much closer to an east-west direction. However, Mexican Federal Highway 57 travels south to Mexico City, so the unusual directional signing prevents confusion.

== Future ==
In 2022, the Texas Department of Transportation (TxDOT) released a feasibility study on upgrading US 57 to an Interstate. The study concluded that US 57 should be widened to a four-lane divided highway from Loop 480 near Eagle Pass to I-35 near Moore that will serve as a progression to an Interstate in the future. In June 2025, TxDOT contracted an engineering firm as a consultant for development and design, but formal approval for the project is subject to the availability of public funds for the project.

== Major intersections ==
County	Location	mi	km	Destinations	Notes
Maverick	Eagle Pass	0.0	0.0	Fed. 57 – Piedras Negras	Mexican border (Eagle Pass International Bridge over the Rio Grande)
Maverick	Eagle Pass	0.4	0.64	Spur 240 (Commercial Street)	No left turn northbound
Maverick	Eagle Pass	0.7	1.1	FM 1021 (Monroe Street) – El Indio, Camino Real International Bridge (trucks to Mexico)	
Maverick	Eagle Pass	1.7	2.7	Bus. US 277 north (Main Street)	Southern end of US 277 Bus. concurrency
Maverick	Eagle Pass	1.8	2.9	FM 375 south (Bibb Avenue)	Northern terminus of FM 375
Maverick	Eagle Pass	2.2	3.5	US 277 north / FM 3443 south (Veterans Boulevard) – Del Rio	Northern end of US 277 Bus. concurrency, southern end of US 277 concurrency, northern terminus of FM 3443
Maverick	Eagle Pass	2.9	4.7	US 277 south – Carrizo Springs	Northern end of US 277 concurrency
Maverick	Eagle Pass	3.7	6.0	Spur 216 west (2nd Street)	
Maverick		5.7	9.2	Loop 480 south	Northern terminus of Loop 480
Maverick		14.7	23.7	FM 481 north – Uvalde	Southern terminus of FM 481
Zavala	La Pryor	46.2	74.4	FM 1436 west	
Zavala	La Pryor	46.3	74.5	US 83 / Loop 305 – Uvalde, Crystal City	south end of Loop 305 concurrency
Zavala	La Pryor	46.8	75.3	Loop 305 north (North Pryor Avenue) – Uvalde	north end of Loop 305 concurrency
Zavala	Batesville	61.0	98.2	FM 117 – Uvalde, Dilley	
Zavala		61.9	99.6	RM 187 north – Sabinal	Southern terminus of RM 187
Zavala		65.2	104.9	FM 1866 west	Eastern terminus of FM 1866
Frio		85.1	137.0	FM 140 – Uvalde, Pearsall	Interchange
Frio		85.1	137.0	FM 3352 south	Northern terminus of FM 3352
Frio		98.1– 98.2	157.9– 158.0	I-35 – Moore, San Antonio, Pearsall	Northern terminus; I-35 exit 111
1.000 mi = 1.609 km; 1.000 km = 0.621 mi: Concurrency terminus; Incomplete access
