= Interstate 92 =

Interstate 92 may refer to:

- The original planned designation for Interstate 94 in Michigan between Detroit and Benton Harbor
- A designation for the proposed East–West Highway through northern New England
