= Milltown International Bridge =

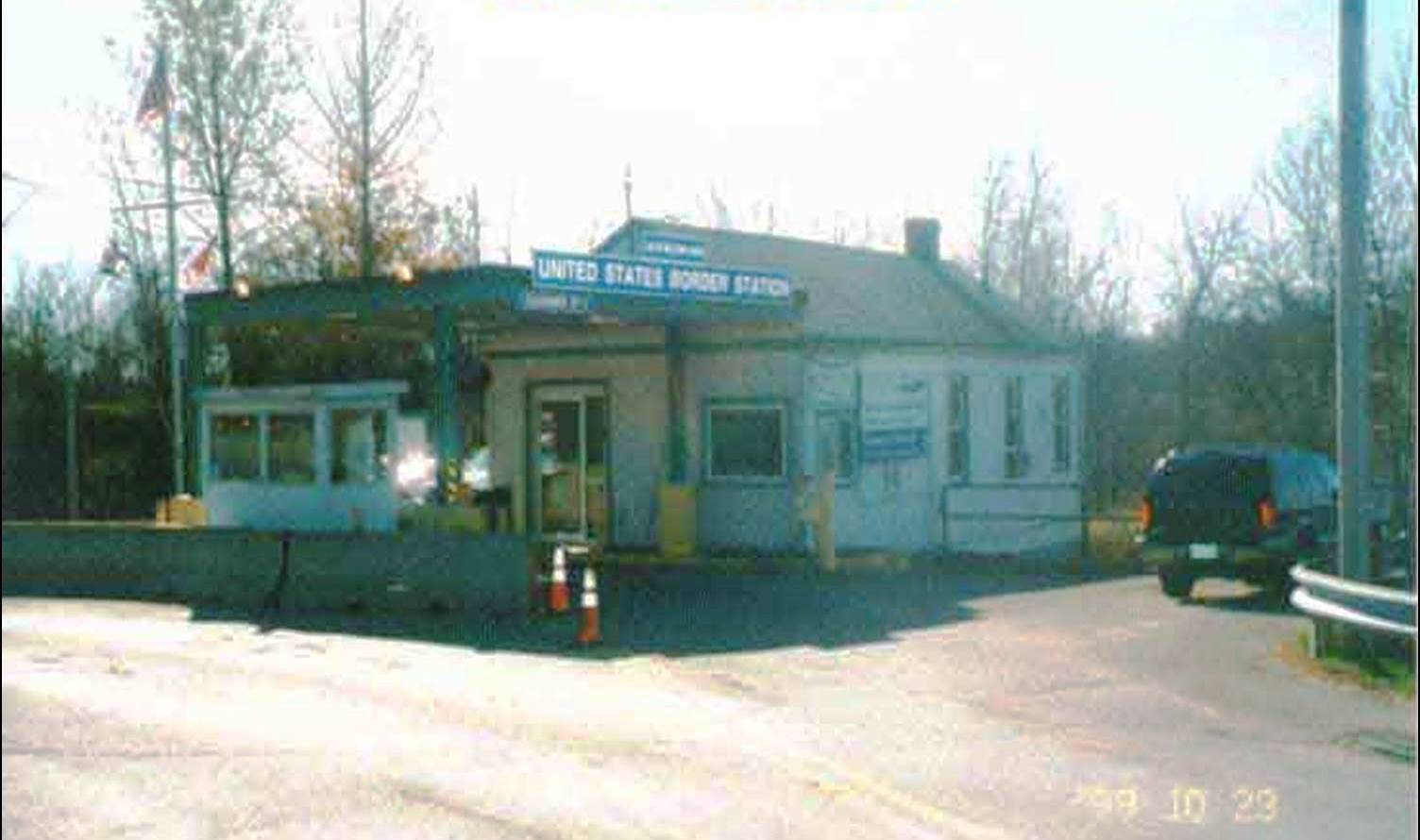
- US Border Station at Calais–Milltown, as seen in 1999
- Coordinates: 45°10′12″N 67°17′48″W
- Locale: St. Stephen, New Brunswick
- Named for: Milltown
- Website: www.cbp.gov/contact/ports/calais-maine-0115

Location
- Interactive map of Milltown International Bridge

The Milltown International Bridge is an international bridge which connects St. Stephen, New Brunswick, in Canada and Calais, Maine, in the United States, across the St. Croix River.

It does not allow commercial traffic and is the smallest and least busy of the three border crossings between St. Stephen and Calais. The others are:

- Ferry Point International Bridge approximately 3.2 km (2.0 mi) downstream
- International Avenue Bridge approximately 1 km (0.62 mi) upstream

Various bridges have existed at this location since 1825. Canada built its border crossing station in 1967. The US border station was built in 1938 and was rebuilt in 2014.

== See also ==
- List of international bridges in North America
