= International Avenue Bridge =

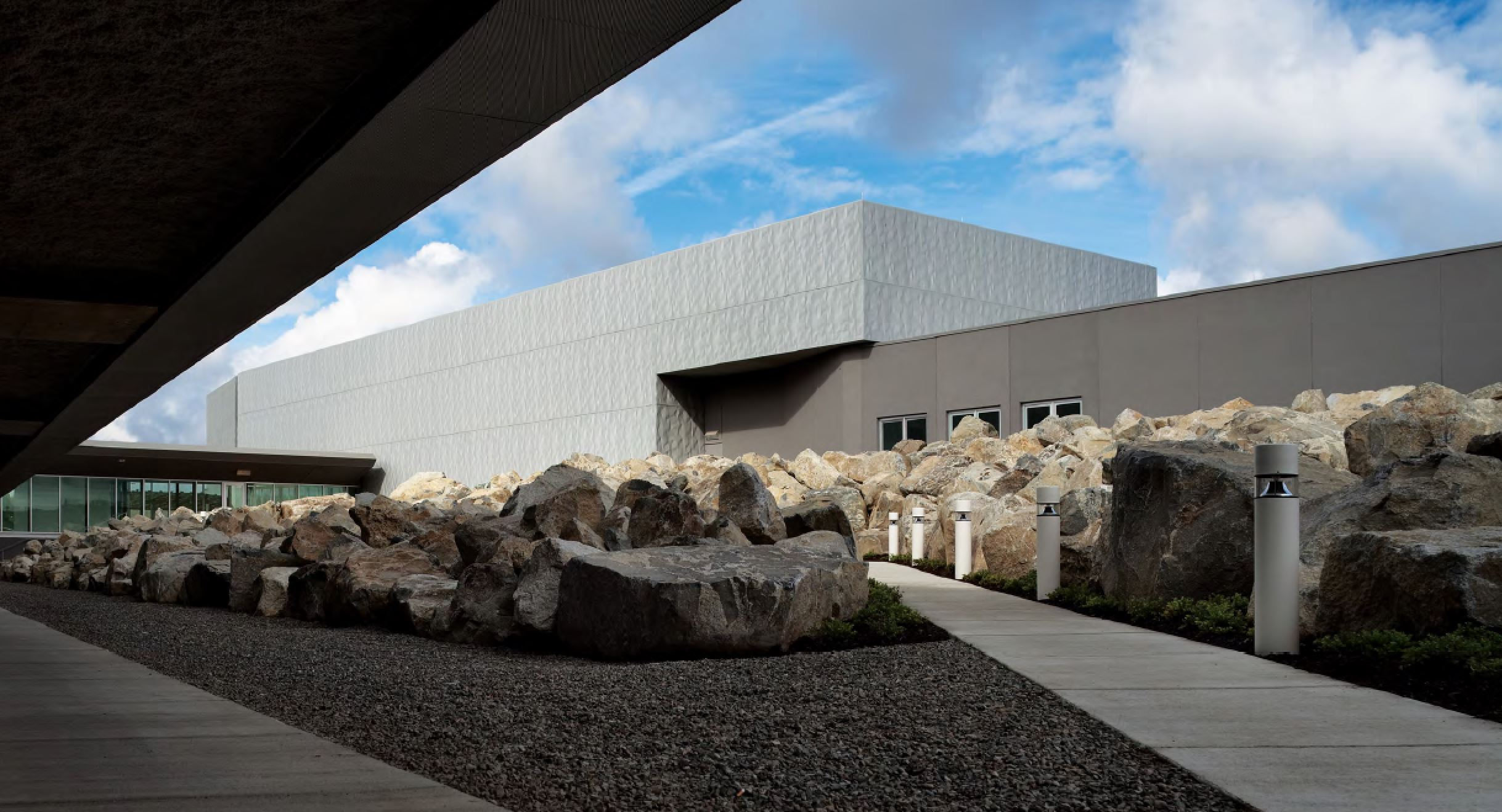
- US Border Station at International Avenue, Calais, Maine
- Coordinates: 45°09′40″N 67°18′11″W
- Carries: Route 1
- Crosses: St. Croix River
- Locale: St. Stephen, New Brunswick

History
- Construction start: 2006
- Opened: November 16, 2009

Location
- Interactive map of International Avenue Bridge

The International Avenue Bridge is an international bridge across the St. Croix River, connecting the town of St. Stephen, New Brunswick in Canada with the city of Calais, Maine in the United States.

It is the third, busiest, and newest bridge connecting the two communities, in addition to the Ferry Point International Bridge and the Milltown International Bridge. The International Avenue Bridge serves commercial, cargo, trucking, passenger vehicles, campers, RVs, buses and other heavy and through traffic, while both the Ferry Point and Milltown crossings remain in use for passenger vehicles and local traffic, which could also use the International Avenue Bridge.

== Border crossing ==
The International Avenue Border Crossing connects the towns of Calais, Maine and St. Stephen, New Brunswick via the International Avenue Bridge. The opening of the crossing in 2009 marked the first time since 1961 (when the Union Bridge was closed) that there have been three bridges connecting Calais with St. Stephen and was the first new border crossing to open on the Canada–US border in 42 years. Currently, all commercial vehicles crossing between these towns must use this crossing.

== History ==
The bridge received US approval in 2006.

Although both facilities began actual operations with the bridge opening on November 16, 2009, the United States Customs facility in Calais was officially opened by Senator Susan Collins on November 23, while the Canada Customs facility in St. Stephen was officially opened by Prime Minister Stephen Harper on January 8, 2010. The new bridge represents the first new Canada–US border crossing between the US and Canada in over 40 years.

== Connecting routes ==
On the New Brunswick side, since October 2012, the bridge connects to New Brunswick Route 1, a four-lane freeway proceeding northeast from the border, through Saint John, and connecting with New Brunswick Route 2, the main route of the Trans-Canada Highway, at River Glade near Moncton.

In Maine, the bridge connects to US 1, a major route along Maine's Atlantic coast and its border areas with New Brunswick; and Maine State Route 9, a link to Interstate 95 at Bangor.

== See also ==
- List of international bridges in North America
