= Eagle Pass–Piedras Negras International Bridge =

Bridge between U.S and Mexico

Eagle Pass – Piedras Negras International Bridge Puente Piedras Negras-Eagle Pass
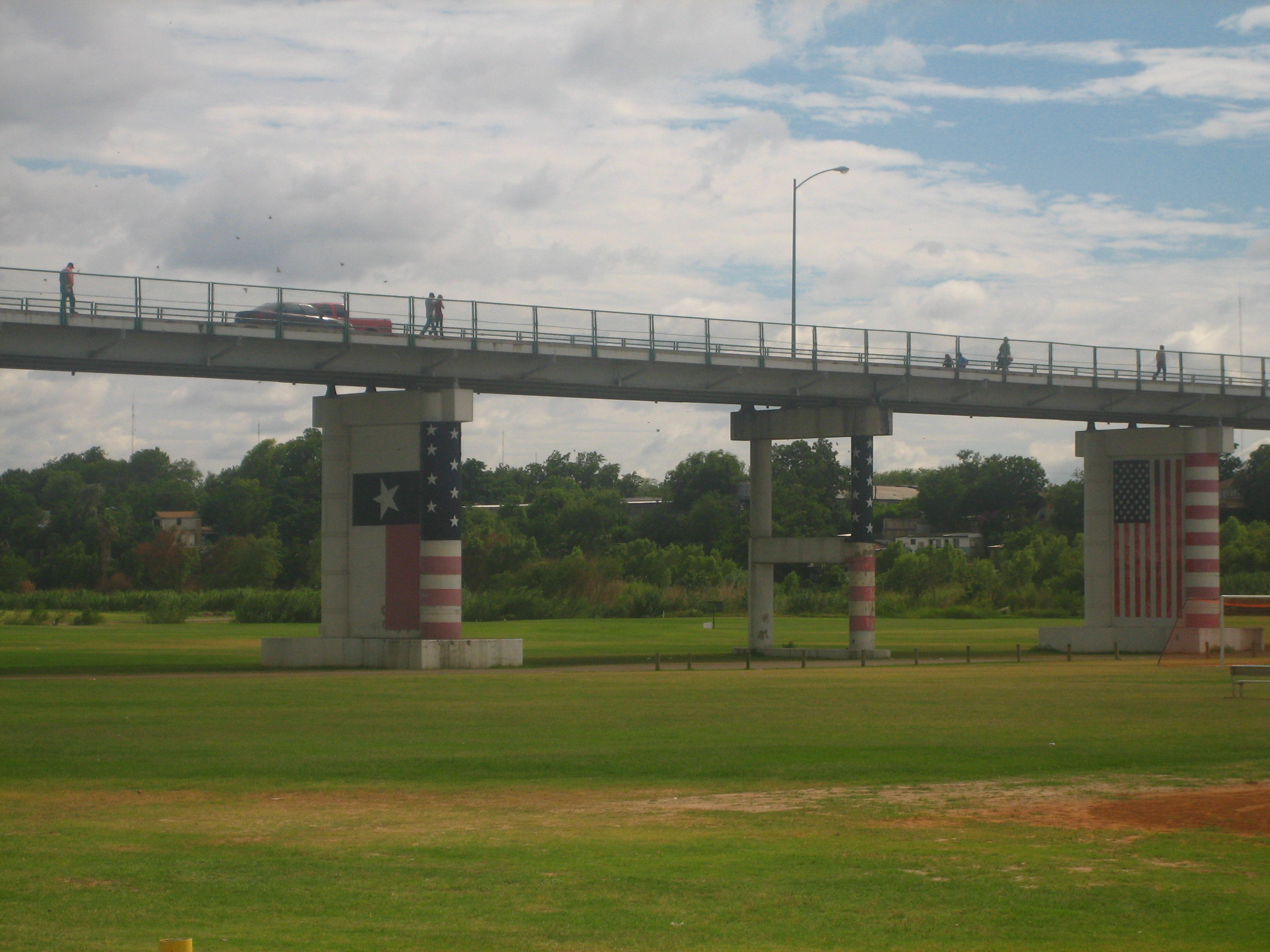
- The American side of the Eagle Pass-Piedras Negras International Bridge
- Coordinates: 28°42′20″N 100°30′43″W
- Carries: US 57 / Fed. 57
- Crosses: Rio Grande
- Locale: Eagle Pass, Texas, United States; Piedras Negras, Coahuila, Mexico
- Official name: Eagle Pass Bridge 1
- Named for: Eagle Pass
- Owner: Port of Eagle Pass
- Maintained by: Port of Eagle Pass

Characteristics
- Total length: 1,855 ft (565 m)
- Width: 2 lanes

History
- Opened: 1927
- Rebuilt: 1954

Statistics
- Toll: Non-Commercial Vehicles: US$4 (southbound); MXN$30 (northbound); Commercial Vehicles: US$5/axle (southbound); MXN$60 (northbound); Pedestrians: US$1 (southbound); MXN$5 (northbound)

Location
- Interactive map of Eagle Pass – Piedras Negras International Bridge

The Eagle Pass–Piedras Negras International Bridge is crosses the Rio Grande and connects the United States-Mexico border cities of Eagle Pass, Texas, US, and Piedras Negras, Coahuila, Mexico.

== Description ==
The American side of the Eagle Pass–Piedras Negras International Bridge is currently owned by the Port of Eagle Pass, which also manages and maintains it. The bridge was originally constructed in 1927 and reconstructed in 1954, after the original bridge was destroyed by a flood; the bridge was reinforced in 1985. The bridge is two lanes wide and 1,855 feet (565 m) long.

The bridge is also known as "Eagle Pass Bridge 1" and "Puente Piedras Negras-Eagle Pass". The road continues into Eagle Pass as U.S. Route 57, and into Piedras Negras as Mexican Federal Highway 57.

== Border crossing ==
The Eagle Pass Port of Entry was established around 1896. The first carriage bridge connecting Eagle Pass with Piedras Negras (then known as Ciudad Porfirio Díaz) was built in April 1890, but was destroyed in a flood in September 1890. The bridge was soon replaced by the Eagle Pass–Piedras Negras International Bridge, and was again rebuilt in 1927 and 1954.

The original port facility was rebuilt in 1927 and was replaced by the current facility in 1960.

Since the construction of the Eagle Pass Camino Real Port of Entry in 1999, all commercial vehicles are inspected there.

== See also ==
- List of international bridges in North America
