= Union Pacific International Railroad Bridge =

U.S.-Mexico border rail crossing

Coordinates: 28°41′47″N 100°30′37″W

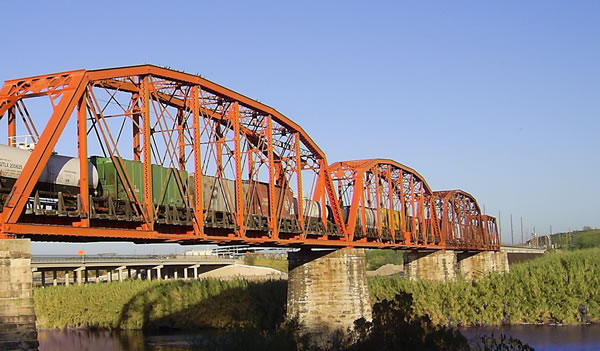
The Union Pacific International Railroad Bridge view from Piedras Negras, with the Camino Real International Bridge in the background

The Union Pacific International Railroad Bridge is the only railway international bridge that crosses the U.S.-Mexico border between the cities of Eagle Pass, Texas, and Piedras Negras, Coahuila. The U.S. portion is owned and operated by Union Pacific Railroad, with BNSF Railway having trackage rights. The Mexican portion is owned by the Mexican federal government, with operation concessioned to Ferromex. It is also known as the Eagle Pass-Piedras Negras International Railway Bridge. The bridge is the second busiest international rail crossing between the U.S. and Mexico.

== See also ==
- Brownsville & Matamoros International Bridge
- List of international bridges in North America
