= East–West Highway (New England) =

Future Interstate 92
- Location: Albany, NY – Portsmouth, NH or Glens Falls, NY – Calais, ME

The East–West Highway is a long-proposed east–west highway corridor in northern New England (Maine, New Hampshire, and Vermont), intended to link remote northern communities in those states with markets in the Maritimes, Quebec, and upstate New York.

== History ==
Low population and natural barriers like the White Mountains have long impeded significant economic development in northern New England, as both passenger and cargo vehicles must take lengthy detours around the mountains when traveling from one state to the next. Proposals for an east–west highway date back to the 1940s. In the early 1970s, all three northern New England states and New York proposed two new Interstate Highway corridors, both of which were designated as Interstate 92:

- From Albany, New York, to Portsmouth, New Hampshire, incorporating the route that is now New Hampshire Route 101 and the corridor that is New York Route 7 and Vermont Route 9.
- From Glens Falls, New York, to Calais, Maine, tracing U.S. Route 4 through Vermont and New Hampshire.

The Federal Highway Administration ultimately did not approve the plan.

Then-Senator Olympia Snowe of Maine said in 2004 that the region is disadvantaged by the fact that it was the only region in the United States for which a federal High Priority Corridor was not designated in the 1991 Intermodal Surface Transportation Efficiency Act.

In 2012, the east–west highway was again proposed, this time as a privately financed toll road.

On October 25, 2012, New Brunswick Route 1 achieved a four-lane divided highway link with the U.S. border at the International Avenue Border Crossing in Calais, Maine. In Maine, the Maine Department of Transportation is working to reroute Maine State Route 9 to be a controlled access highway from the end of Interstate 395 to Route 9 in Eddington to allow a faster highway connection to Calais and the Canadian cities beyond.

== Location ==
Current backers of the highway propose an east–west axis through northern and central Maine; these could cover up to three existing surface ports of entry on the U.S.-Canada border, two from Québec; and one from New Brunswick. Any new highway achieving the New Brunswick crossing would run from Interstate 395 in Brewer, Maine, to the international border near Calais, with a direct link to New Brunswick Route 1, a major transportation corridor serving the Maritimes. A potential obstacle to the eastern end of such an American highway could be the presence of the Moosehorn National Wildlife Refuge, as its Baring Division's easternmost extremities, on the American side, lie close to the International Avenue Bridge that crosses the St. Croix River, the international border in the area. In the west, the more southerly located link with Québec would travel northwest from Interstate 95 near Waterville, Maine, to the Canada–United States border at Coburn Gore, with a connection to a proposed extension of the Canton de l'Est extension of Quebec's Autoroute 10 eastwards from Montreal. One possible routing for an "east-west freeway" would travel due west from Interstate 95 near Waterville, following the U.S. Route 2 corridor through Maine, New Hampshire, Vermont, and upper New York state. The more northerly-located link to Québec would exist with Autoroute 73, whose Chaudière-Appalaches proposed southeast extension within Quebec could link through, and generally heads directly towards (as Quebec Route 173 already does) the existing Armstrong–Jackman Border Crossing some 57 km (35 mi) northeast of Coburn Gore, despite no link to the American Interstate Highway System existing or planned to exist to it. Only the two-lane U.S. Route 201 - Maine State Route 6 currently has a northern terminus at that specific port of entry.

There are two existing mainline freeway links on both sides of the border between New England and Canada: the north–south linkup at the Derby Line–Rock Island Border Crossing, between Interstate 91 in Vermont and Quebec Autoroute 55 (opened in 1978), and the crossing between Interstate 95 and New Brunswick Route 95 at the Houlton–Woodstock Border Crossing. An additional crossing was anticipated further west between Vermont and Québec, with an expected linkup between Interstate 89, which already ends at the international border at the Highgate Springs–St. Armand/Philipsburg Border Crossing, and Quebec Autoroute 35, via the Autoroute's planned extension from its current southern terminus at Saint-Sébastien to the international border. While there were plans to complete the extension of Autoroute 35 from Saint-Sébastien to the border crossing at I-89's northern terminus by 2025 to finally create a freeway-to-freeway connection, the new extension of Autoroute 35 ended just north of the border crossing due to the final phase of the project being postponed indefinitely. In spite of the lack of a direct freeway-to-freeway connection between Interstate 89 and Autoroute 35, however, the completed southern extension of Autoroute 35 has closed the gap of 4-lane roadway between the two highways, providing a complete 4-lane divided highway link between Quebec and Boston.

Northern New England is served by three north–south freeways radiating generally northwards from Boston — from east to west, Interstate 95, Interstate 93, and U.S. Route 3, all coming from or through the Boston metro area; and westernmost of all, by Interstate 91, which follows the Connecticut River. However, the northernmost complete east–west freeway existing within the region, Interstate 90 in Massachusetts, does not enter northern New England. Continuous east–west freeway travel through (and within) northern New England is presently accomplished by three segments, only one of which is truly east–west:

- Interstate 89 is generally a northwest–southeast-running highway over the portion of its route from Burlington, Vermont, to its southern terminus at Interstate 93 near Concord, New Hampshire. I-93 continues the southeast direction of travel to Manchester, New Hampshire.
- New Hampshire Route 101 is freeway standard from I-93 in Manchester eastward to Interstate 95 near Hampton Beach, New Hampshire. The I-89/I-93 interchange near Concord is less than 15 miles (24 km) northwest of NH-101.
- Interstate 95, in paralleling the Atlantic coastline, runs in a northeastern direction through much of Maine, only curving more northward after Bangor.

There are a handful of alternate east–west roadways, including US 2 between Montpelier, Vermont, and Bangor, Maine; US 302 between Montpelier and Portland, US 4 from the New York/Vermont border to Portsmouth, New Hampshire; and VT 9 /NH 9 between Bennington, Vermont, and the Concord, New Hampshire, area. These alternatives are mostly not limited access or designed for higher speed travel.

The presence of Massachusetts Route 2 as a signed east-west Massachusetts state roadway, whose own east–west route to New York state lies between Interstate 90 to its south, and the Massachusetts-Northern New England border, is not as significant, as MA Route 2 does not exist as a freeway through much of its length.

== Opposition ==
A number of groups in Maine oppose the creation of the East-West Highway / Corridor, citing environmental concerns such as the impact on wetlands and the risks of oil spills from pipelines along the corridor, as well as the increased impact of sprawl-type development. The issue has led to repeated protests and was one of the few areas of agreement between the candidates for governor of Maine in 2014.

== See also ==
- Interstate 98
- New Brunswick Route 1, a Canadian freeway whose western end is nearest to Calais, Maine
- Quebec Autoroute 73, another Canadian freeway that's proposed to head towards the Maine/Canada border
- Future Interstate Highways
