= Camino Real International Bridge =

Camino Real International Bridge Eagle Pass-Piedras Negras International Bridge II
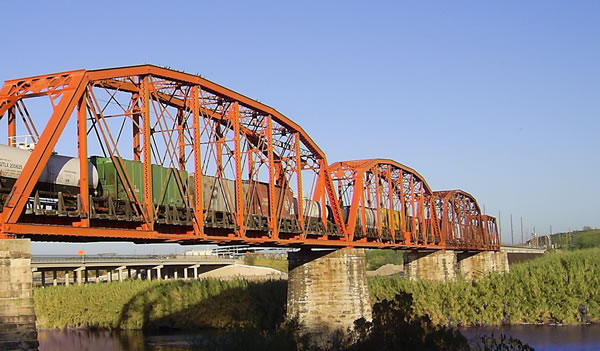
- Image showing the Camino Real International Bridge in the background and the Union Pacific International Railroad Bridge in the foreground, as seen from Piedras Negras
- Coordinates: 28°41′52″N 100°30′38″W
- Crosses: Rio Grande
- Locale: Eagle Pass, Texas, United States; Piedras Negras, Coahuila, Mexico
- Official name: Puente Dos
- Other name: Puente Camino Real
- Owner: City of Eagle Pass and CAPUFE
- Maintained by: City of Eagle Pass and CAPUFE

Characteristics
- Total length: 1,384 ft (422 m)
- Width: 82 ft (25 m)

History
- Opened: September 24, 1999

Statistics
- Toll: Non-Commercial Vehicles: US$4.00 (southbound); MXN$30 (northbound); Commercial Vehicles: US$5/axle (southbound); MXN$60 (northbound); Pedestrians: US$1 (southbound); MXN$5 (northbound)

Location
- Interactive map of Camino Real International Bridge

The Camino Real International Bridge is an international bridge which crosses the Rio Grande connecting the United States-Mexico border cities of Eagle Pass, Texas, and Piedras Negras, Coahuila. The bridge is also known as "Eagle Pass-Piedras Negras International Bridge II", "Puente Dos", "Puente Camino Real" and "Puente Internacional Coahuila 2000".

== Description ==
The American part of the Camino Real International Bridge is owned and managed by the City of Eagle Pass. The Mexican part is owned and managed by Caminos y Puentes Federales de Ingresos y Servicios Conexos (CAPUFE), the Mexican federal toll road and bridge authority. The bridge was originally constructed on September 24, 1999. The bridge is six lanes and 82 feet (25 m) wide by 1,384 feet (422 m) long and includes two six-foot sidewalks for pedestrians.

== Location ==
The international bridge is located a half-mile south of the Eagle Pass-Piedras Negras International Bridge and immediately north of the Eagle Pass Union Pacific International Railroad Bridge, the American part of which is owned by Union Pacific and the Mexican part owned by the Mexican federal government and concessioned to Ferromex.

== Border crossing ==
The Eagle Pass Camino Real Port of Entry was built in 1999. It is the location where all commercial vehicles entering Eagle Pass are inspected.

== See also ==
- List of international bridges in North America
