= Ferry Point Border Crossing =

Canada–United States border crossing

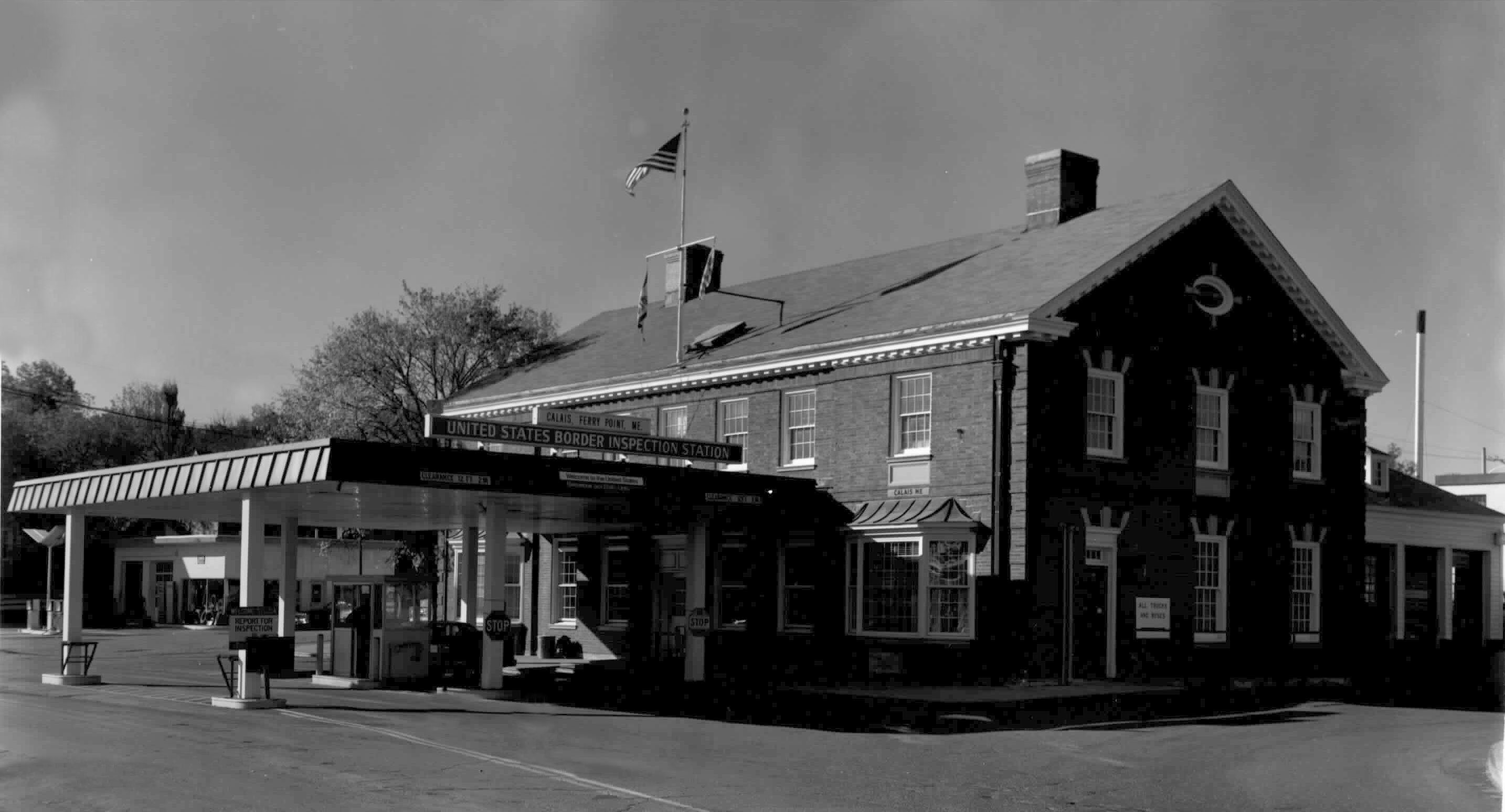
- US Border Inspection Station, 2003 photo

Location
- Country: United States; Canada
- Location: US Port: 1 Main Street, Calais, ME 04619; Canadian Port: 204 Milltown Boulevard, St. Stephen NB E3L 1G8
- Coordinates: 45.191791°N 67.283546°W

Details
- Opened: 1876

Website
- Official US website; Official Canadian website
- U.S. Inspection Station-Calais (Ferry Point), Maine
- U.S. National Register of Historic Places
- MPS: U.S. Border Inspection Stations MPS
- NRHP reference No.: 14000559
- Added to NRHP: September 10, 2014

The Ferry Point Bridge Crossing connects the downtowns of Calais, Maine and St. Stephen, New Brunswick on the Canada–US border. This crossing is located at the Ferry Point International Bridge. Various bridges have existed at this location since 1826. In 1847, a more substantial covered toll bridge was completed. It was replaced by a steel bridge in 1895 that featured a streetcar line, and it no longer required payment of a toll. This bridge was for many years the principal crossing point between the two communities. St. Stephen is also connected to Calais by the Milltown International Bridge approximately 3.2 km (2.0 mi) upstream and the International Avenue Bridge, approximately 4.4 km (2.7 mi), which opened in November 2009. After the completion of the International Avenue Border Crossing, commercial trucks were prohibited from crossing the border at this location, significantly reducing the through truck traffic passing through the nearby downtown areas.

The current US facility, built in 1935–36, was listed on the National Register of Historic Places in 2014. The current Canadian facility was built in 1955.

== United States facilities ==
The United States border station is located at the south end of the Ferry Point Bridge, and just west of Calais's central business district. The main building is a 2 1/2-story brick structure with Colonial Revival style, from which a two-lane metal porte-cochere extends. The building has a side gable roof and corbelled brick chimneys. The building corners have brick quoining, and many of its windows have angled brick-and-marble lintels with keystones. There is a rosette window at the center of the main facade, and similar louvered openings at the tops of the side gables. The interior of the building's first floor is divided into roughly equal parts, one for customs and one for immigration facilities. The second floor, which originally housed living quarters, is now used for storage and meeting space. This building was designed in 1932 and built in 1935–36, reflecting the then-popular use of Colonial Revival architecture in government buildings.

Other buildings in the facility include a four-bay wood-frame garage with a pyramidal roof, built about 1936, and a c.1980 shed-roof garage with two bays.

This border station was built as part of a program instituted by the US federal government in the late 1920s to provide for more direct controls over border crossing points. The increasing use of the automobile, and increased smuggling due to Prohibition. Prior to construction of this facility, customs and immigration was located in leased space on the east (northbound) side of the bridge.

== See also ==
- List of Canada–United States border crossings
- National Register of Historic Places listings in Washington County, Maine
