= Eagle Pass, Texas =

- City
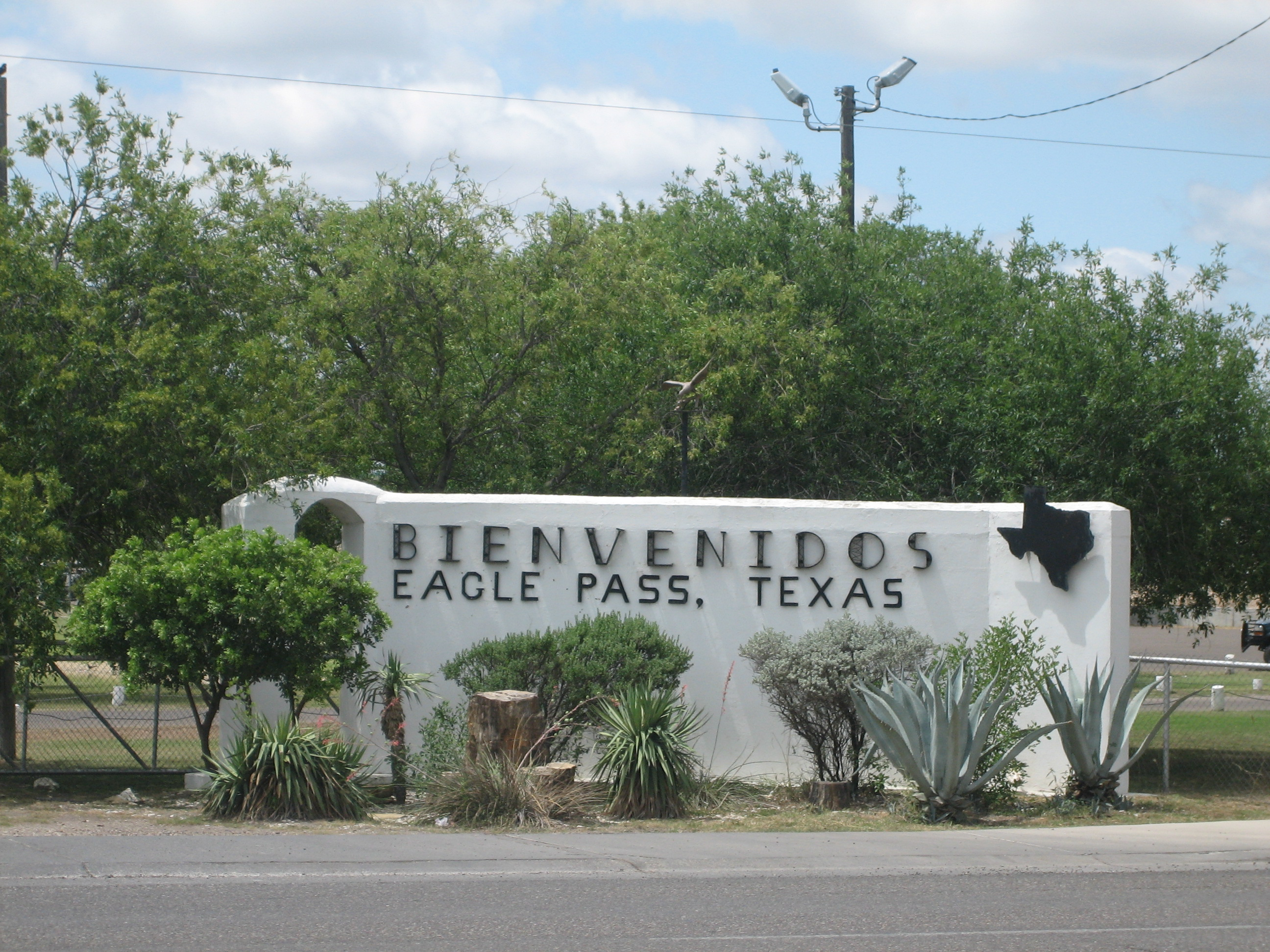
- Nicknames: El Aguilón; El Paso del Águila
- Location of Eagle Pass, Texas

- Location in the United States Location in Texas
- Coordinates: 28°42′38″N 100°29′22″W
- Country: United States
- State: Texas
- County: Maverick

Government
  - Type: Mayor–council
  - Mayor: Aaron E. Valdez
  - City Council: Members: Jessica Rey Ramon; Mario E. Garcia; Eloisa R. Medina
  - City Manager: Homero Balderas

Area
  - Total: 9.49 sq mi (24.58 km^{2})
  - Land: 9.42 sq mi (24.40 km^{2})
  - Water: 0.069 sq mi (0.18 km^{2})
- Elevation: 732 ft (223 m)

Population (2020)
  - Total: 28,130
  - Density: 3,151.0/sq mi (1,216.59/km^{2})
- Time zone: UTC-6 (Central (CST))
  - Summer (DST): UTC-5 (CDT)
- ZIP codes: 78852-78853
- Area code: 830
- FIPS code: 48-21892
- GNIS feature ID: 1356538
- Website: www.eaglepasstx.gov

Eagle Pass is a city in and the county seat of Maverick County, Texas, United States. Its population was 28,130 as of the 2020 census. Eagle Pass borders the city of Piedras Negras, Coahuila, Mexico, which is to the southwest and across the Rio Grande river.

== History ==
Eagle Pass was the first American settlement on the Rio Grande. Originally known as Camp Eagle Pass, it served as a temporary outpost for the Texas militia, which had been ordered to stop illegal trade with Mexico during the Mexican–American War. Eagle Pass is so named because the contour of the hills through which the Rio Grande flows bore a fancied resemblance to the outstretched wings of an eagle.

General William Leslie Cazneau (1807–1876) founded the Eagle Pass townsite in the 1840s. In 1850, Rick Pawless opened a trading post called Eagle Pass. In 1871, Maverick County was established, and Eagle Pass was named the county seat. During the remainder of the 19th century, schools and churches opened, the mercantile and ranching industries grew, and a railway was built.

On April 24, 2007, at 7:00 pm CDT, a tornado tore through outside of Eagle Pass and caused loss of life and property damage. Major damage occurred in southern part of the town.

The City of Eagle Pass was sued by the US government in 2008 to gain access to the land and construct a fence on the United States-Mexico border. An ongoing public corruption, bid-rigging, and kickback investigation by the FBI and Texas Department of Public Safety has resulted in the arrest and imprisonment of all four Maverick County commissioners, one justice of the peace, and several local government employees and businessmen since October 2012, making it the largest public criminal probe in Eagle Pass and Maverick County history. On February 20, 2015, a federal grand jury in Del Rio indicted a county commissioner and a former county justice of the peace in connection with an alleged bribery, kickback, and bid-rigging scheme, all related to the ongoing public corruption investigation. On February 23, 2015, former Maverick County Commissioner Rodolfo Heredia was sentenced to 10 years in federal prison, followed by three years of supervised release, and ordered to perform 1,200 hours of community service after completing his prison term. He was also ordered to pay a maximum of $56,003.88 in restitution to Maverick County.

On August 8, 2012, a federal grand jury in the U.S. District Court in Del Rio indicted five Eagle Pass residents, including a former Public Works Department employee, in connection with an estimated $70,000 credit-card fraud scheme. According to the indictment, during 2011, City of Eagle Pass employee Edgar Aguilar obtained five City of Eagle Pass-owned Fuelman credit cards designated for fuel purchases for Public Works department vehicles and distributed them to his accomplices to purchase fuel for their own vehicles and to purchase fuel for others at the city's expense. In some instances, defendants charged individuals a reduced rate for fuel purchased using the city's credit card and then pocketed the cash. On November 29, 2012, Aguilar entered a guilty plea for the charges of theft and fraud, and on May 15, 2013, was sentenced to 42 months in federal prison and ordered to pay $68,373.87 in restitution for his role in the fraudulent scheme.

On March 30, 2017, Hector Chavez Sr., the former Eagle Pass city manager, pleaded guilty to lying to the FBI regarding a bribery scheme involving public contracts in Maverick County. Chavez, with the company Chace Management, was charged with receiving $20,000 from the owner of the engineering firm Hejl, Lee, and Associates to bribe a county commissioner to procure a $270,000 contract for the engineering firm. Chavez admitted to having given false information in 2015. Chavez was sentenced to 42 months in federal prison and three years' supervised release on August 21, 2017.

On January 11, 2024, following Texas Governor Greg Abbott signing an emergency declaration to close down Shelby Park as a part of Operation Lone Star, the Texas National Guard and Texas Rangers took control of the park, blocking the United States Border Patrol from patrolling the area (which is located along the Rio Grande, and the border between the United States and Mexico). This started the Standoff at Eagle Pass.

== Geography ==
The area is served by U.S. Routes 57 and 277, and Farm-to-Market Road 481. Maverick County Memorial International Airport is a general aviation field. The nearest commercial air service is 50 miles away, via the Del Rio International Airport in Del Rio, which is served by American Airlines.

=== Climate ===
Eagle Pass has a hot semi-arid climate (Köppen: BSh). The average hottest month is August, and the highest recorded temperature was 115 °F (46.1 °C) in 1916 and 1944. Typically, the coolest month is January, while the lowest recorded temperature was 10 °F (−12.2 °C) in 1962. Most precipitation occurs in the spring through fall with a drier winter. The highest monthly average precipitation occurs in September, with a secondary peak in May and June. Late July and August demonstrate a significant, secondary dry season, with very high temperatures and high sun exposure, resulting in high evaporation rates.

Climate data for Eagle Pass, Texas, 1991–2020 normals, extremes 1897–2018
Month	Jan	Feb	Mar	Apr	May	Jun	Jul	Aug	Sep	Oct	Nov	Dec	Year
Record high °F (°C)	96 (36)	101 (38)	106 (41)	108 (42)	114 (46)	115 (46)	115 (46)	112 (44)	111 (44)	106 (41)	100 (38)	94 (34)	115 (46)
Mean maximum °F (°C)	81.7 (27.6)	86.7 (30.4)	92.5 (33.6)	99.1 (37.3)	101.3 (38.5)	104.2 (40.1)	104.2 (40.1)	105.0 (40.6)	101.0 (38.3)	95.7 (35.4)	88.4 (31.3)	80.8 (27.1)	107.4 (41.9)
Mean daily maximum °F (°C)	64.5 (18.1)	70.0 (21.1)	77.6 (25.3)	84.4 (29.1)	90.3 (32.4)	96.0 (35.6)	97.5 (36.4)	98.6 (37.0)	91.8 (33.2)	83.4 (28.6)	72.4 (22.4)	64.8 (18.2)	82.6 (28.1)
Daily mean °F (°C)	52.1 (11.2)	56.7 (13.7)	64.5 (18.1)	71.0 (21.7)	78.1 (25.6)	83.9 (28.8)	85.6 (29.8)	86.5 (30.3)	80.4 (26.9)	71.4 (21.9)	60.3 (15.7)	52.3 (11.3)	70.2 (21.3)
Mean daily minimum °F (°C)	39.7 (4.3)	43.4 (6.3)	51.4 (10.8)	57.7 (14.3)	65.9 (18.8)	71.8 (22.1)	73.8 (23.2)	74.3 (23.5)	69.1 (20.6)	59.3 (15.2)	48.3 (9.1)	39.8 (4.3)	57.9 (14.4)
Mean minimum °F (°C)	28.2 (−2.1)	30.6 (−0.8)	36.4 (2.4)	45.6 (7.6)	56.8 (13.8)	65.9 (18.8)	70.0 (21.1)	69.6 (20.9)	57.8 (14.3)	45.1 (7.3)	34.9 (1.6)	27.5 (−2.5)	24.0 (−4.4)
Record low °F (°C)	10 (−12)	10 (−12)	20 (−7)	32 (0)	42 (6)	47 (8)	62 (17)	60 (16)	42 (6)	27 (−3)	19 (−7)	12 (−11)	10 (−12)
Average precipitation inches (mm)	0.74 (19)	0.74 (19)	1.18 (30)	2.02 (51)	2.80 (71)	2.20 (56)	2.10 (53)	1.68 (43)	3.29 (84)	2.14 (54)	1.13 (29)	0.81 (21)	20.83 (530)
Average precipitation days (≥ 0.01 in)	3.8	3.6	3.7	3.5	4.5	3.8	3.4	3.0	5.3	3.5	3.7	3.5	45.3
Source 1: NOAA
Source 2: National Weather Service (mean maxima/minima 1981–2010)

== Demographics ==
Historical population
Census	Pop.	Note	%±
1850	383		—
1860	522		36.3%
1870	1,240		137.5%
1880	1,627		31.2%
1910	3,536		—
1920	5,765		63.0%
1930	5,059		−12.2%
1940	6,457		27.6%
1950	7,276		12.7%
1960	12,094		66.2%
1970	15,364		27.0%
1980	21,407		39.3%
1990	20,651		−3.5%
2000	22,413		8.5%
2010	26,248		17.1%
2020	28,130		7.2%
U.S. Decennial Census; 2018 Estimate

As of 2020 census, the Piedras Negras Metropolitan Area population was 209,456 inhabitants. The Eagle Pass-Piedras Negras metropolitan area (EP-PN) is one of six binational metropolitan areas along the United States-Mexican border.

=== 2020 census ===
As of the 2020 census, there were 28,130 people, 9,342 households, and 7,053 families residing in the city.

The median age was 36.0 years, 27.1% of residents were under the age of 18, and 16.6% were 65 years of age or older; for every 100 females there were 90.4 males and for every 100 females age 18 and over there were 86.3 males age 18 and over.

Of the 9,342 households, 40.6% had children under the age of 18 living in them, 49.9% were married-couple households, 15.1% had a male householder with no spouse or partner present, and 31.5% had a female householder with no spouse or partner present; 22.1% of households were made up of individuals and 11.2% had someone living alone who was 65 years of age or older.

There were 10,279 housing units, of which 9.1% were vacant; the homeowner vacancy rate was 1.5% and the rental vacancy rate was 8.9%.

100.0% of residents lived in urban areas, while 0.0% lived in rural areas.

Racial composition as of the 2020 census
Race	Number	Percent
White	8,580	30.5%
Black or African American	144	0.5%
American Indian and Alaska Native	185	0.7%
Asian	167	0.6%
Native Hawaiian and Other Pacific Islander	3	0.0%
Some other race	6,845	24.3%
Two or more races	12,206	43.4%
Hispanic or Latino (of any race)	26,664	94.8%

=== 2006 ===
As of the census of 2006, 24,847 people, 6,925 households, and 5,588 families resided in the city. The population density was 3,030.3 people/sq mi (1,169.4/km^{2}). The 7,613 housing units averaged 1,029.3/sq mi (397.2/km^{2}). The racial makeup of the city was 42.73% White, 0.27% African American, 0.39% Native American, 0.76% Asian, 22.71% from other races, and 3.13% from two or more races. Hispanics or Latinos of any race were 96.90% of the population.

Of the 6,925 households, 43.5% had children under the age of 18 living with them, 59.0% were married couples living together, 18.3% had a female householder with no husband present, and 19.3% were not families. About 17.7% of all households were made up of individuals, and 9.5% had someone living alone who was 65 or older. The average household size was 3.22, and the average family size was 3.69.

In the city, the population was distributed as 32.7% under 18, 8.6% from 18 to 24, 25.6% from 25 to 44, 19.9% from 45 to 64, and 13.1% who were 65 or older. The median age was 32 years. For every 100 females, there were 88.5 males. For every 100 females age 18 and over, there were 81.8 males.

The median income for a household in the city was $23,623, and for a family was $27,140. Males had a median income of $26,350 versus $17,346 for females. The per capita income for the city was $11,414. About 26.0% of families and 29.0% of the population were below the poverty line, including 34.0% of those under age 18 and 39.1% of those age 65 or over.

== Economy ==
The City of Eagle Pass is home to small and large businesses alike, but its primary sectors are retail, import/export, and manufacturing. Two of its largest manufacturers are Mossberg and MicroStar. It was in 2014 when Maverick Arms decided to expand to Eagle Pass after it received assistance from the State of Texas using the Texas Enterprise Fund.

The City of Eagle Pass and Maverick County recently adopted matching incentives policies (2020) making it easier for outside businesses to expand operations in the region. Incentives are handled through the city's Economic Development Department.

Because of its location along the U.S./Mexico border, the retail sector is healthy due to the large number of visitors Eagle Pass gets from Mexico. It is estimated that on a regular weekday, Eagle Pass gets 6,000 people across into the U.S. vs. 10,000 on the weekend. Many of these visitors stay within the city limits to shop and eat at local restaurants.

== Government ==
The United States Postal Service operates a post office located at 410 S Bibb Ave.

The United States Border Patrol has two stations in Eagle Pass. The Eagle Pass North Station is at 2285 Del Rio Blvd and the Eagle Pass South Station at 4156 El Indio Hwy.

Eagle Pass is the headquarters of the Kickapoo Traditional Tribe of Texas, a federally recognized tribe of Kickapoo people.

== Transportation ==
Highways in the area are:

- U.S. Route 57
- U.S. Route 277
- State Highway 131

== Utilities ==
In 2000, as part of the power exchange between Texas and Mexico, a high-voltage direct current facility equipped with insulated-gate bipolar transistors was built. This facility, built for Central Power and Light (now AEP Texas) by the ABB Group, operates at a bipolar voltage of 15.9 kV, and has a maximum transfer rate of 36 megawatts. The power station enables AEP to purchase electricity from Mexico's Comisión Federal de Electricidad, when needed.

== Media ==
- Eagle Pass News Leader
- The News Gram
- The Maverick Times
- EPTXN

== Notable people ==
- Tres Barrera (born 1994), backup catcher for the Washington Nationals
- Rian James (1899–1953), author and screenwriter
- Louis Lane (1923–2016) conductor of Cleveland and Atlanta symphonies
- Biz Mackey (1897–1965), catcher and manager in Negro League baseball
- Robert C. Mathis (1927–2016), retired Air Force four-star general, served as Vice Chief of Staff, U.S. Air Force
- Guadalupe Garcia McCall, author and educator. Her 2012 book "Summer of the Mariposas" takes place in the city.
- Connie Douglas Reeves (1901–2003), rancher, National Cowgirl Museum and Hall of Fame
- Gus Sorola (born 1978), co-founder of Rooster Teeth
- Gerard Roland Vela (1927–2021), microbiologist and university professor

== Gallery ==
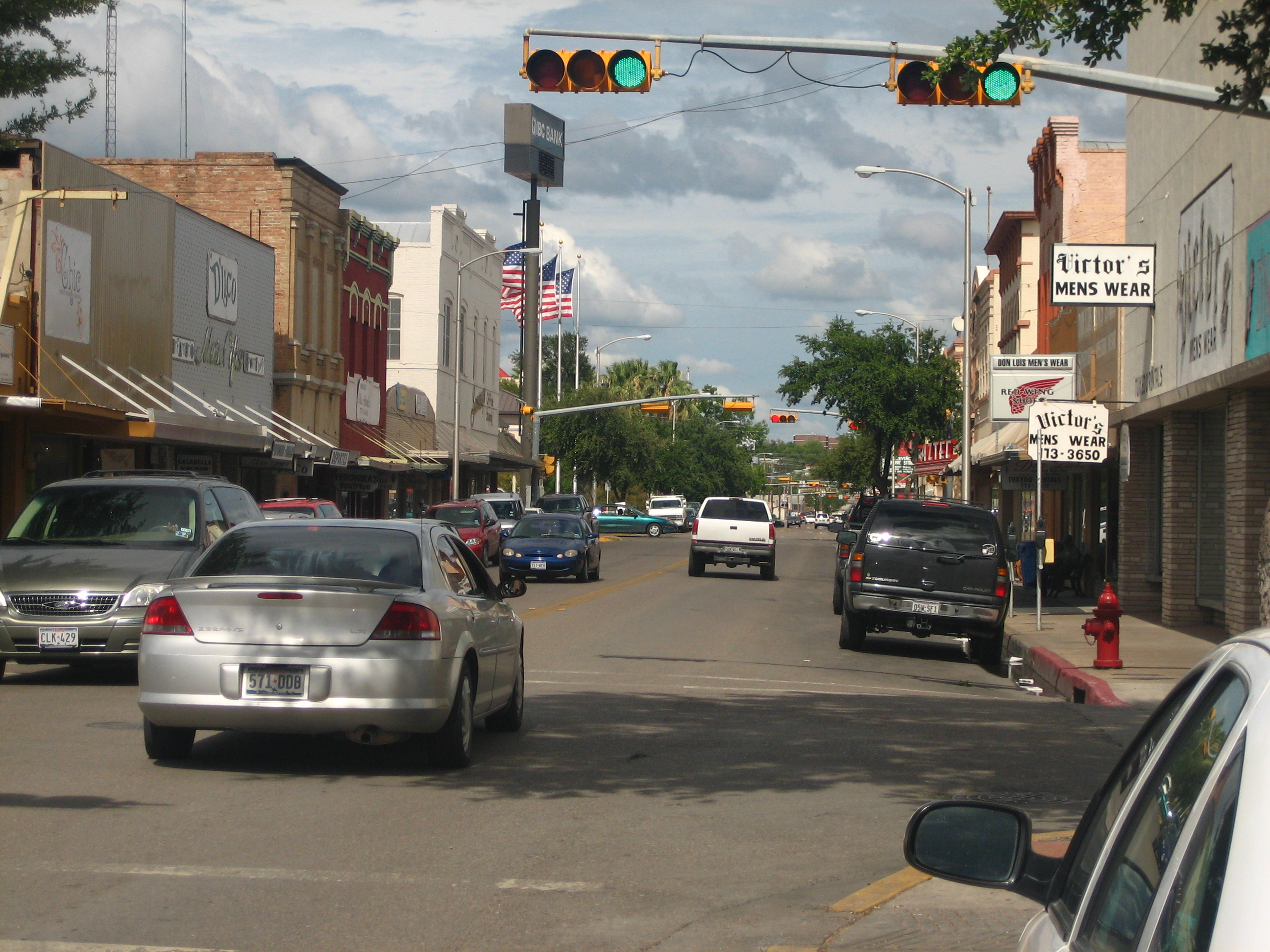
Downtown Eagle Pass

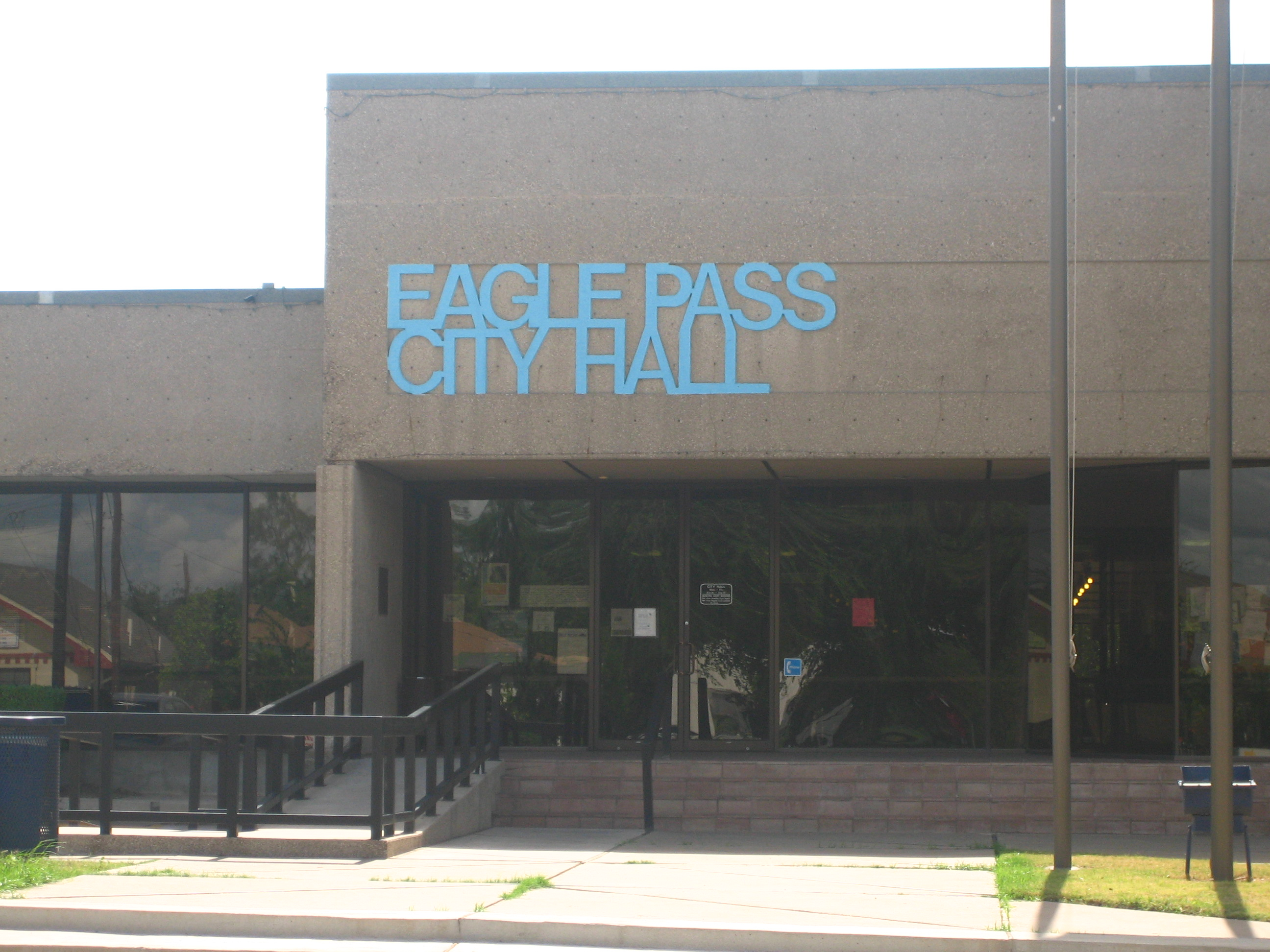
Eagle Pass City Hall at the foot of International Bridge

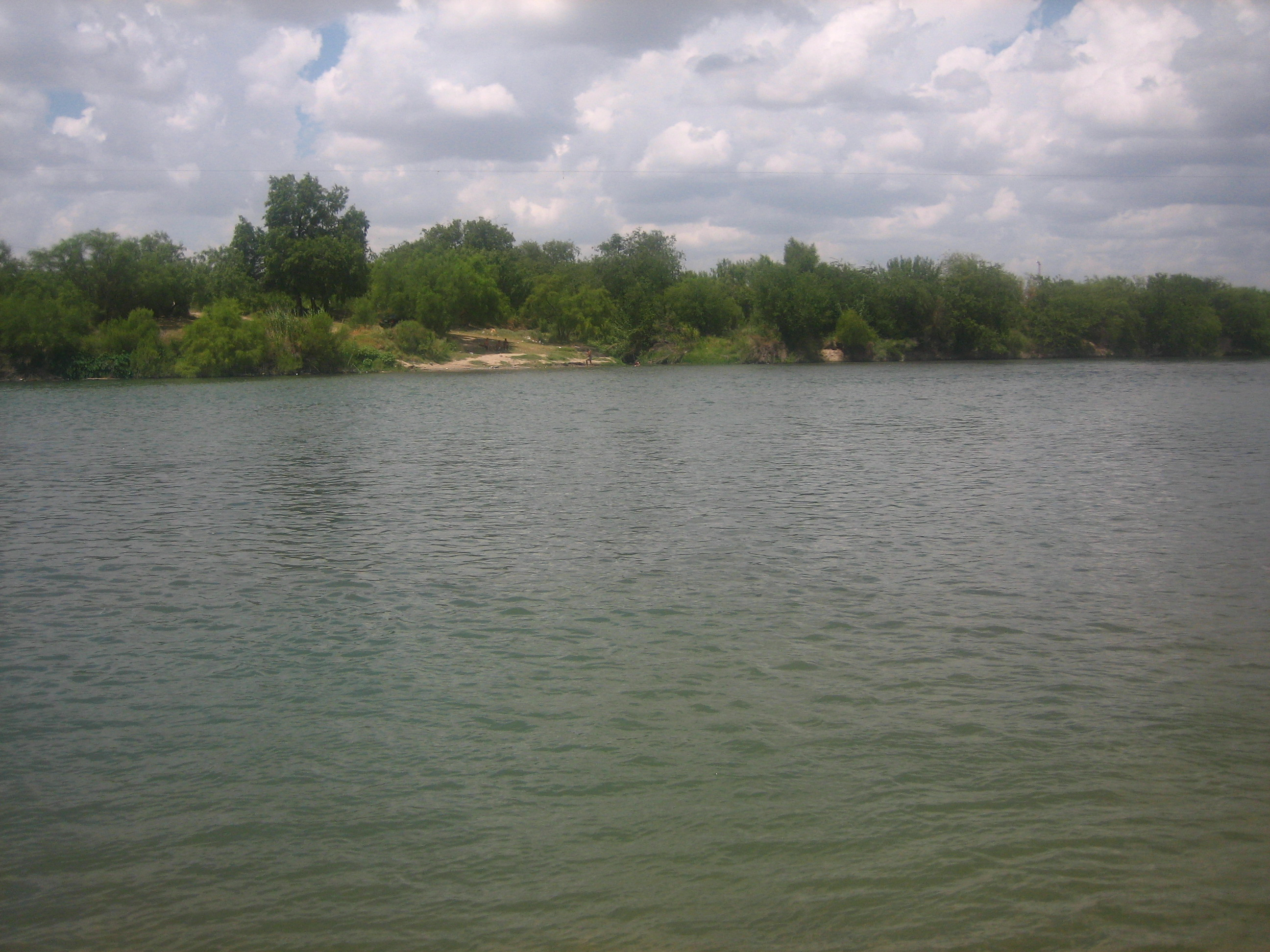
The Rio Grande at Eagle Pass, Texas, with Piedras Negras in the background

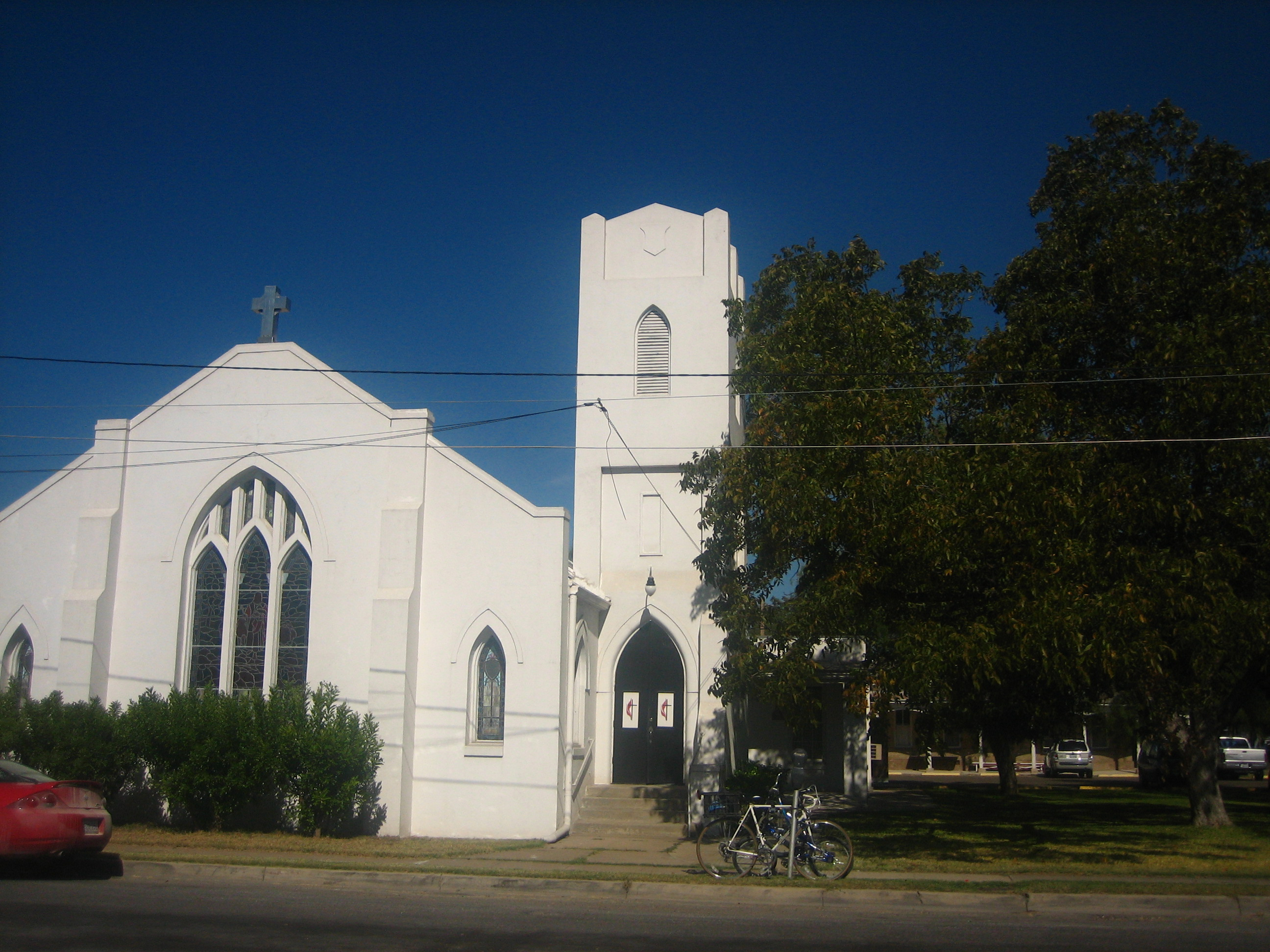
Historic First United Methodist Church on Quarry Street

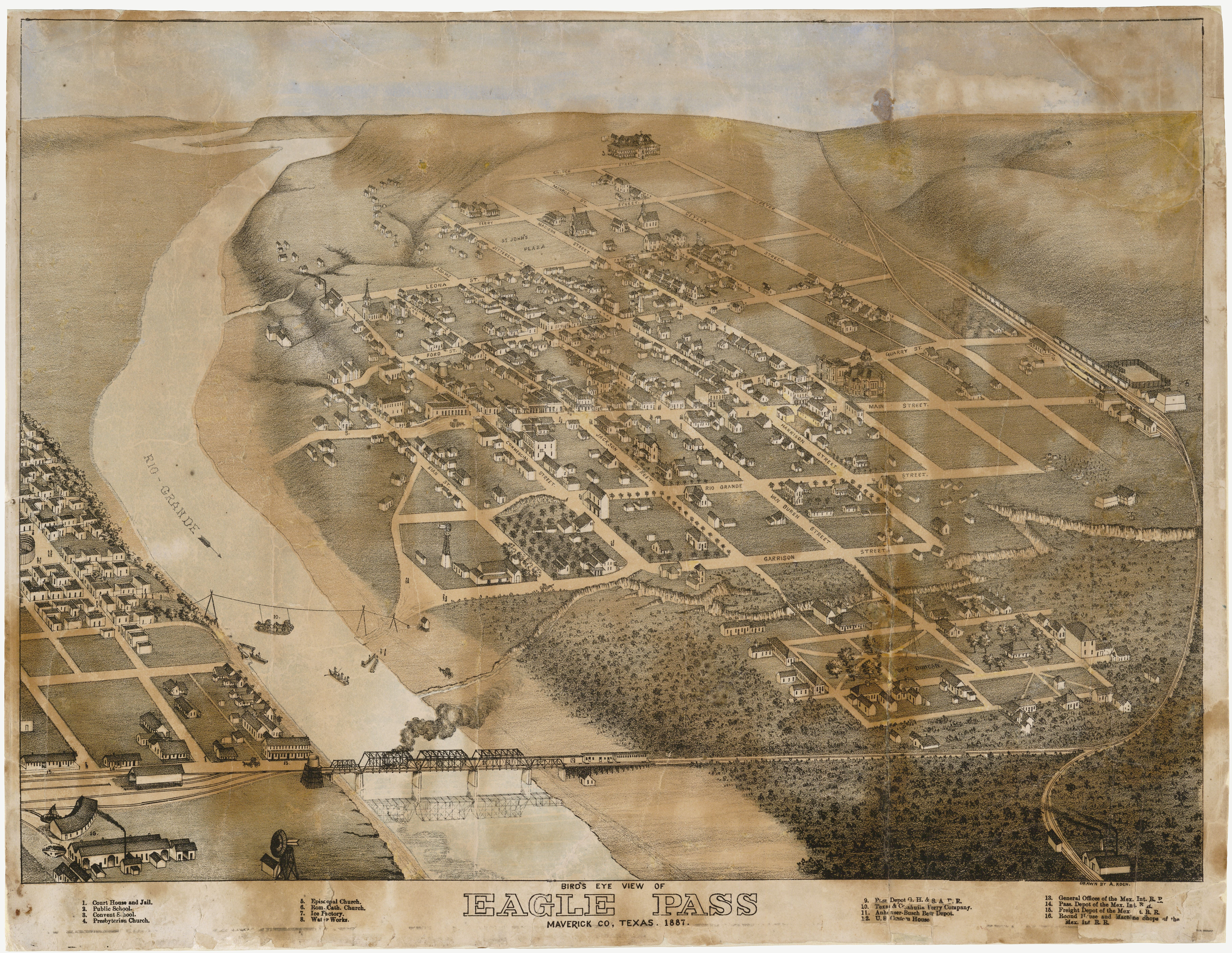
Map of the city 1887

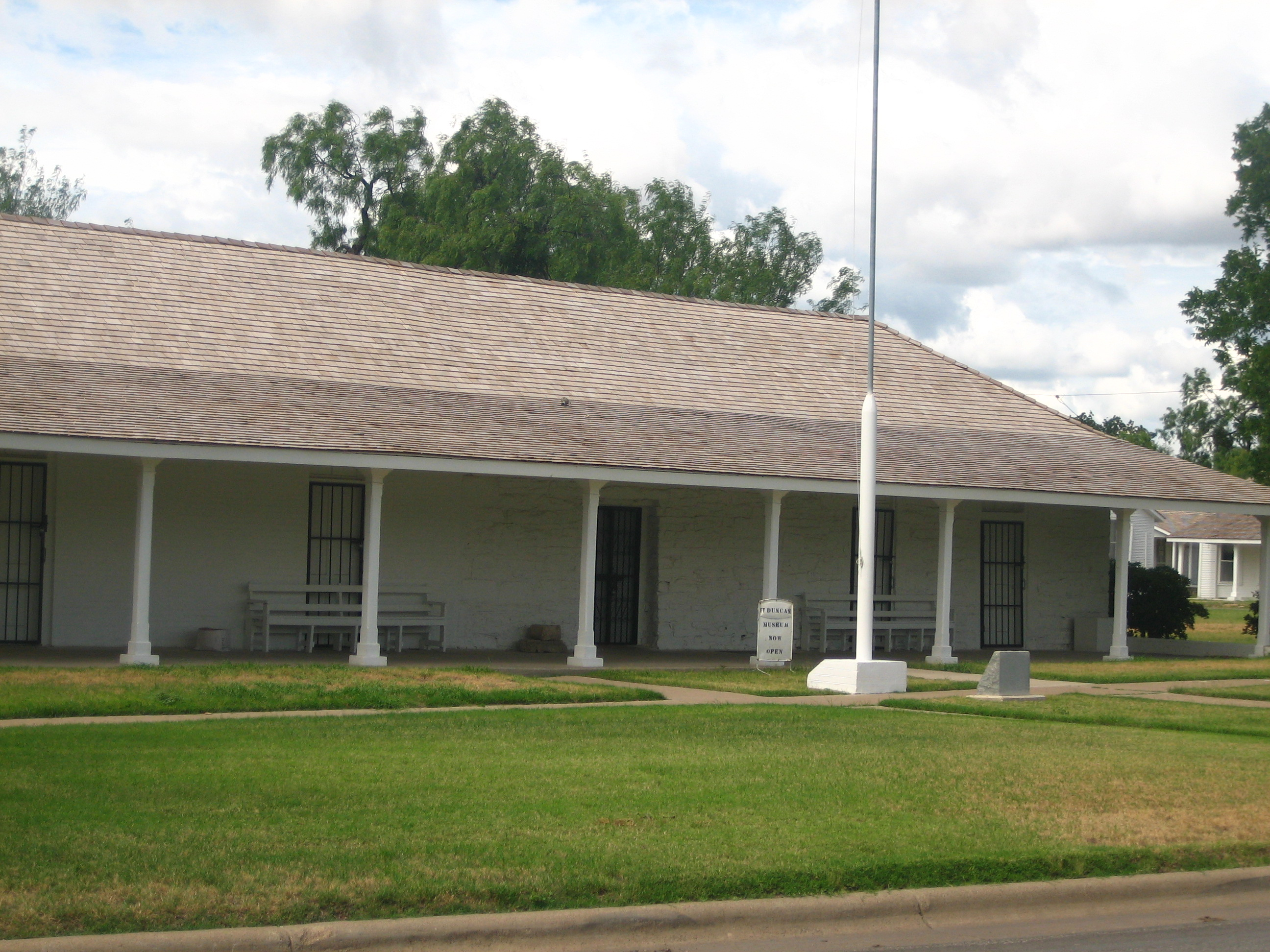
The restored Fort Duncan in Eagle Pass is located near the International Bridge.

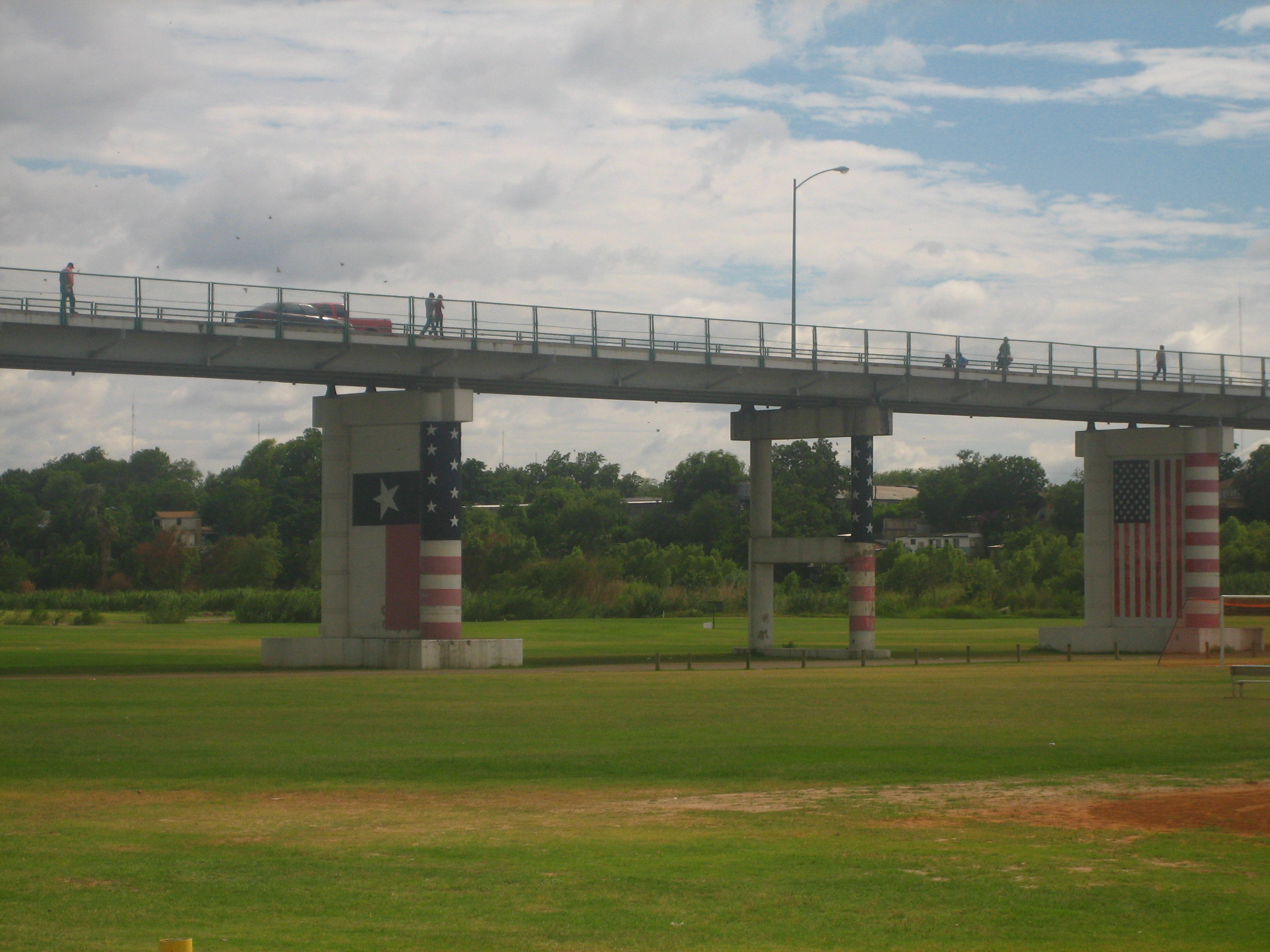
The International Bridge across the Rio Grande in Eagle Pass

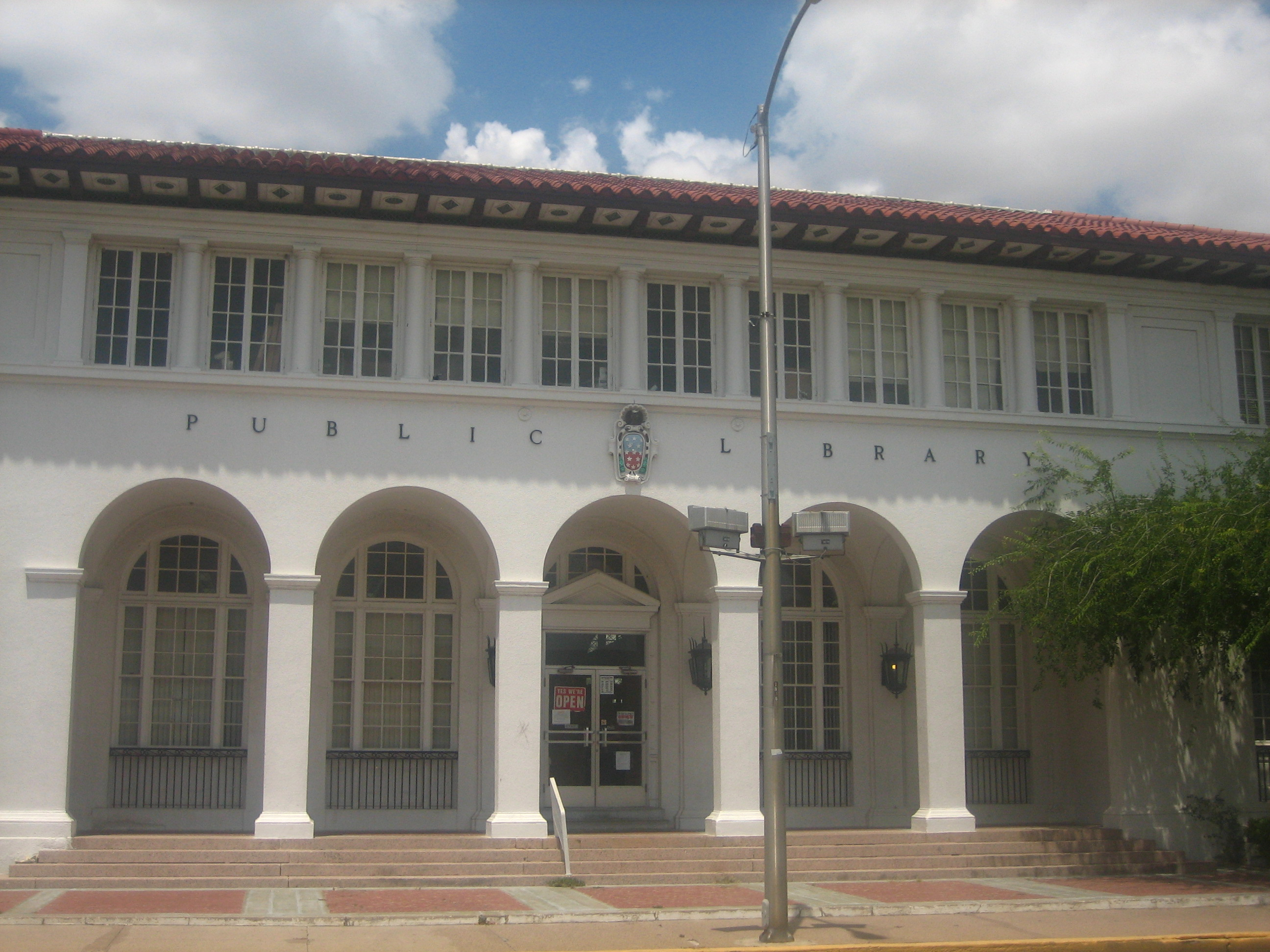
The Eagle Pass public library is located on Main Street east of the Maverick County Courthouse.

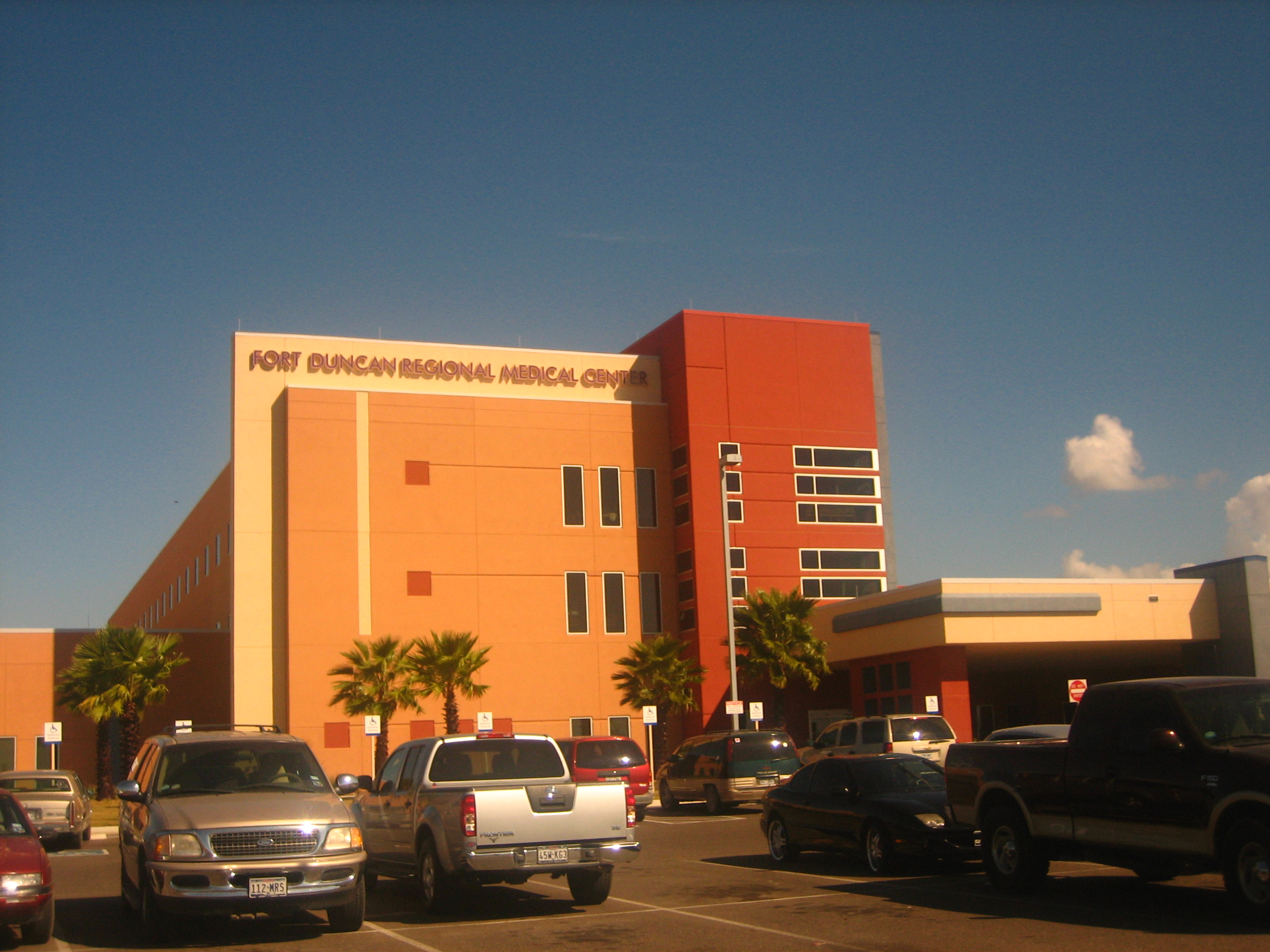
Fort Duncan Medical Center in Eagle Pass is named after the former US Army outpost.

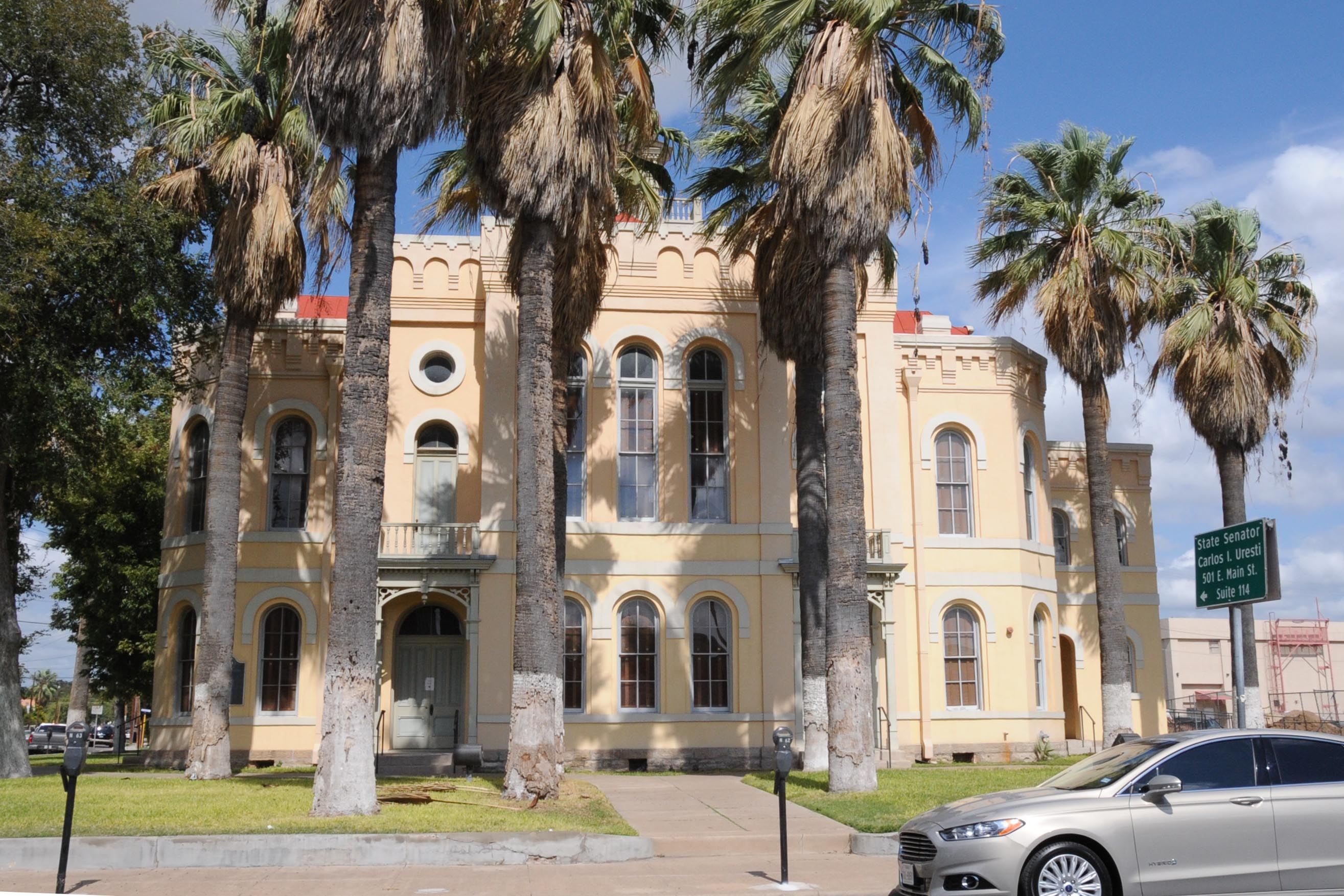
Historic Maverick County Courthouse

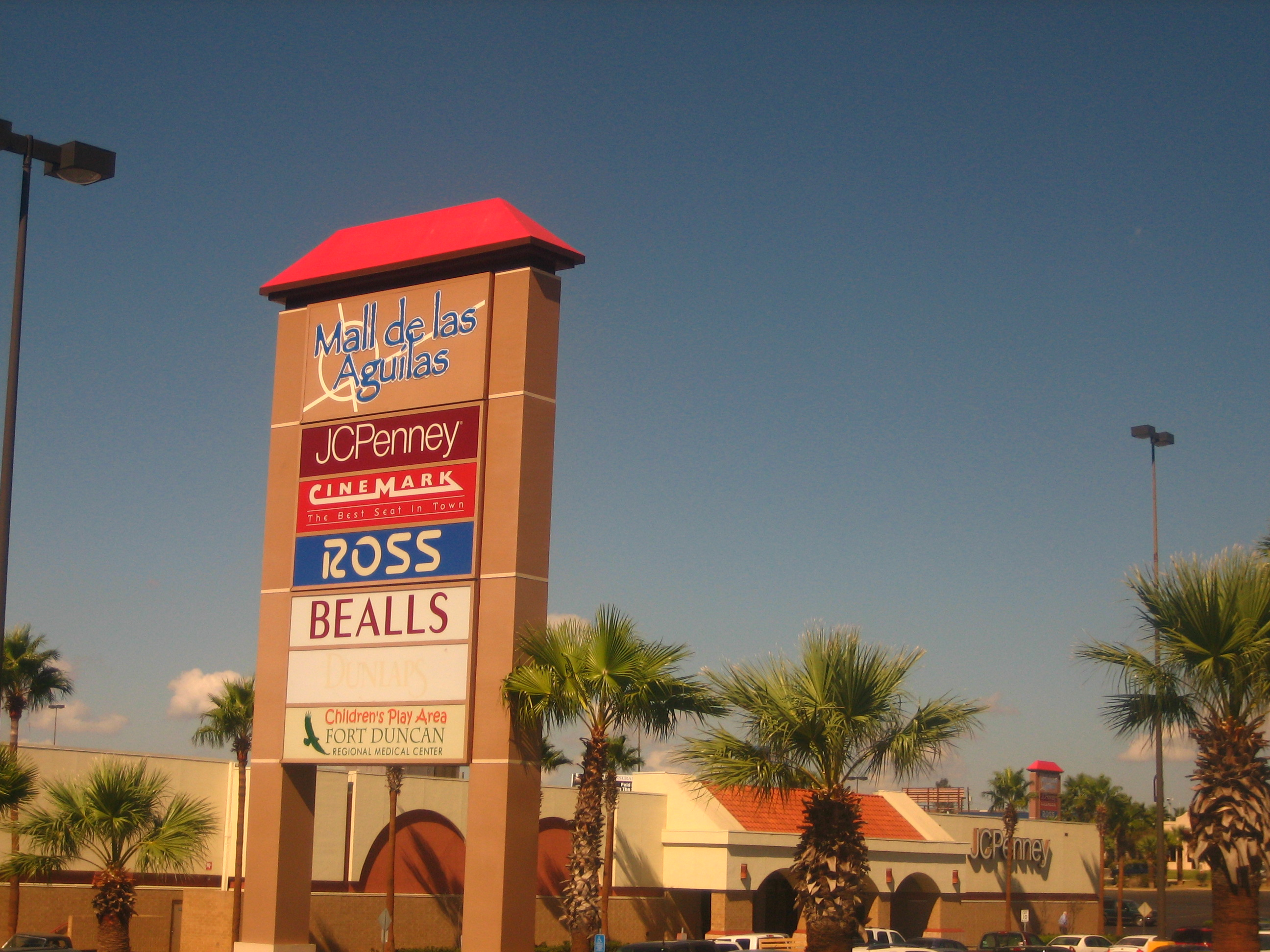
Mall de las Aguilas on Bibb Street in Eagle Pass

== See also ==
- Camino Real International Bridge
- Eagle Pass – Piedras Negras International Bridge
- Fort Duncan
- Union Pacific International Railroad Bridge
- Kickapoo Traditional Tribe of Texas
