= Interstate 98 =

Interstate 98 may refer to:

- Interstate 696, initially proposed as Interstate 98
- Various local proposals to upgrade U.S. Route 11 in New York to an Interstate Highway
