= Piedras Negras, Coahuila =

City in the Mexican state of Coahuila

Piedras Negras
- City
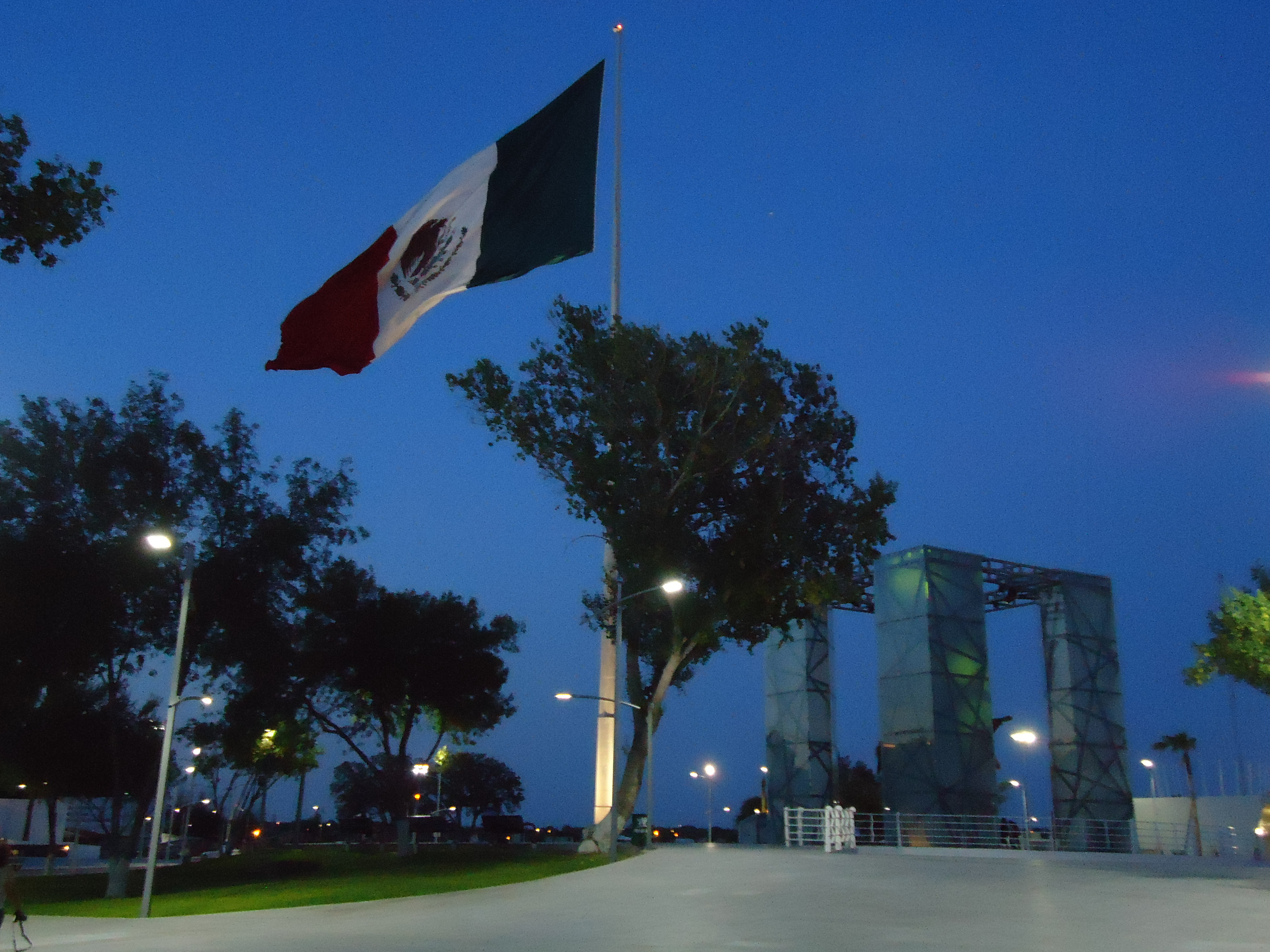
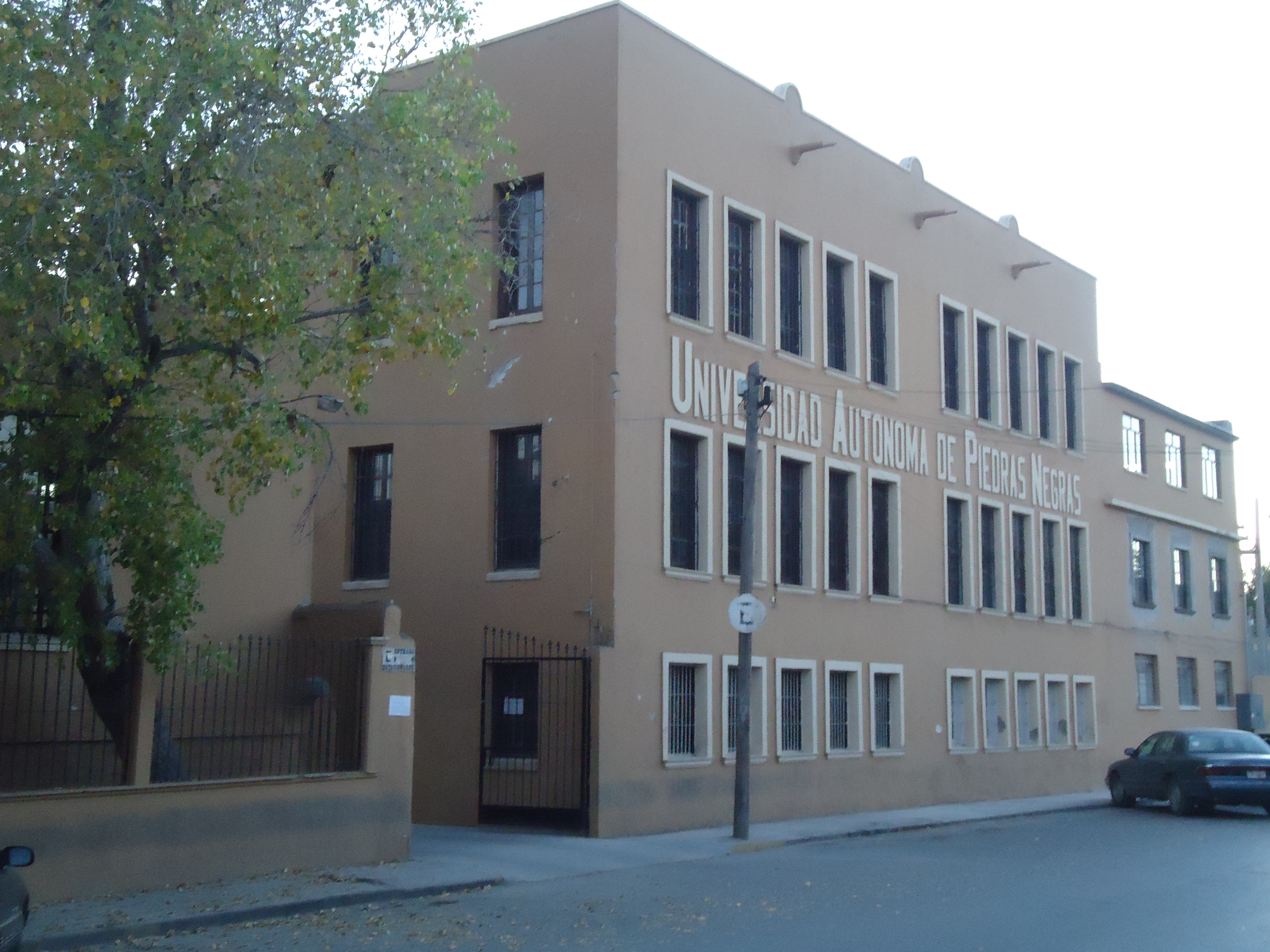
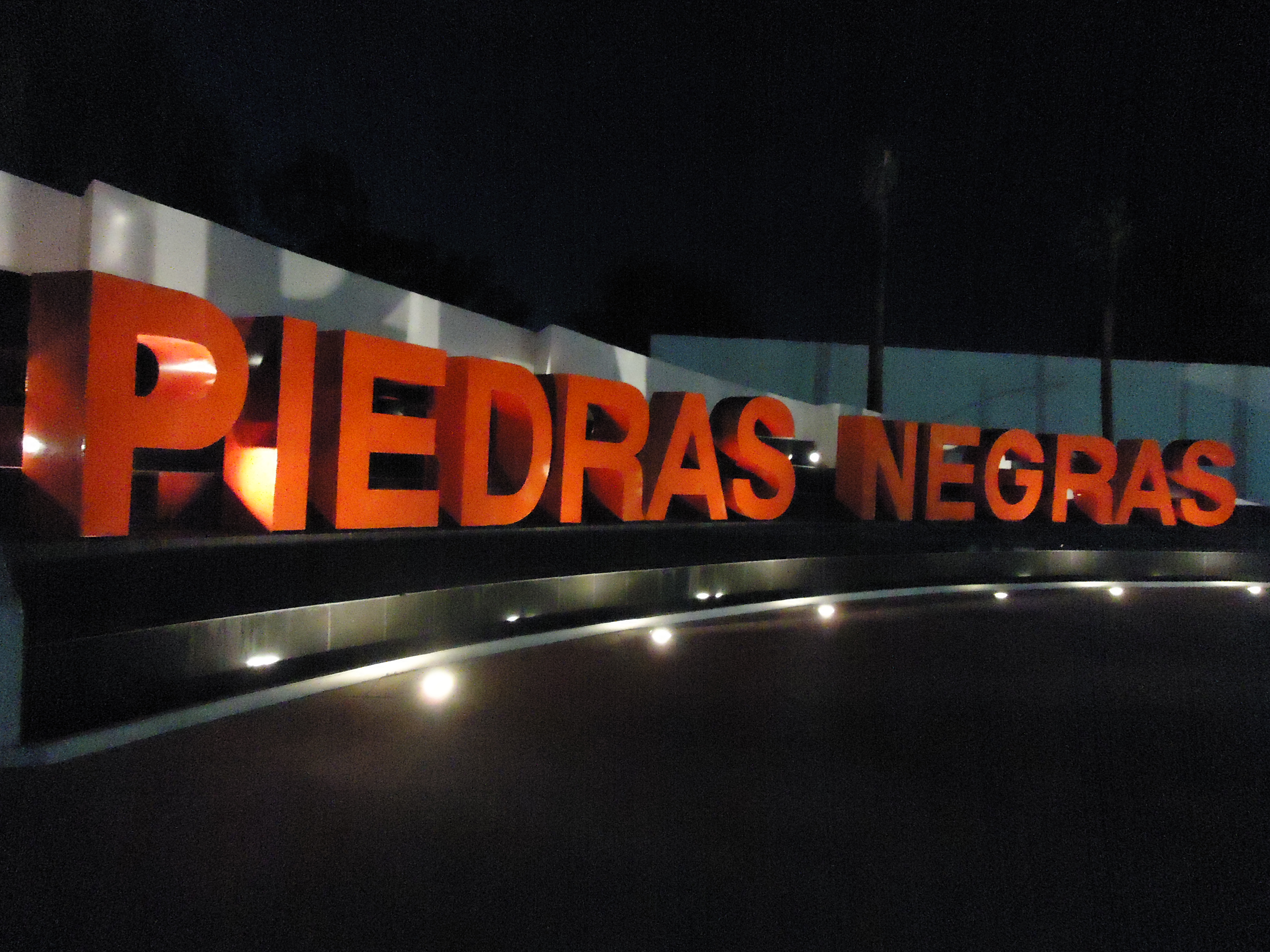
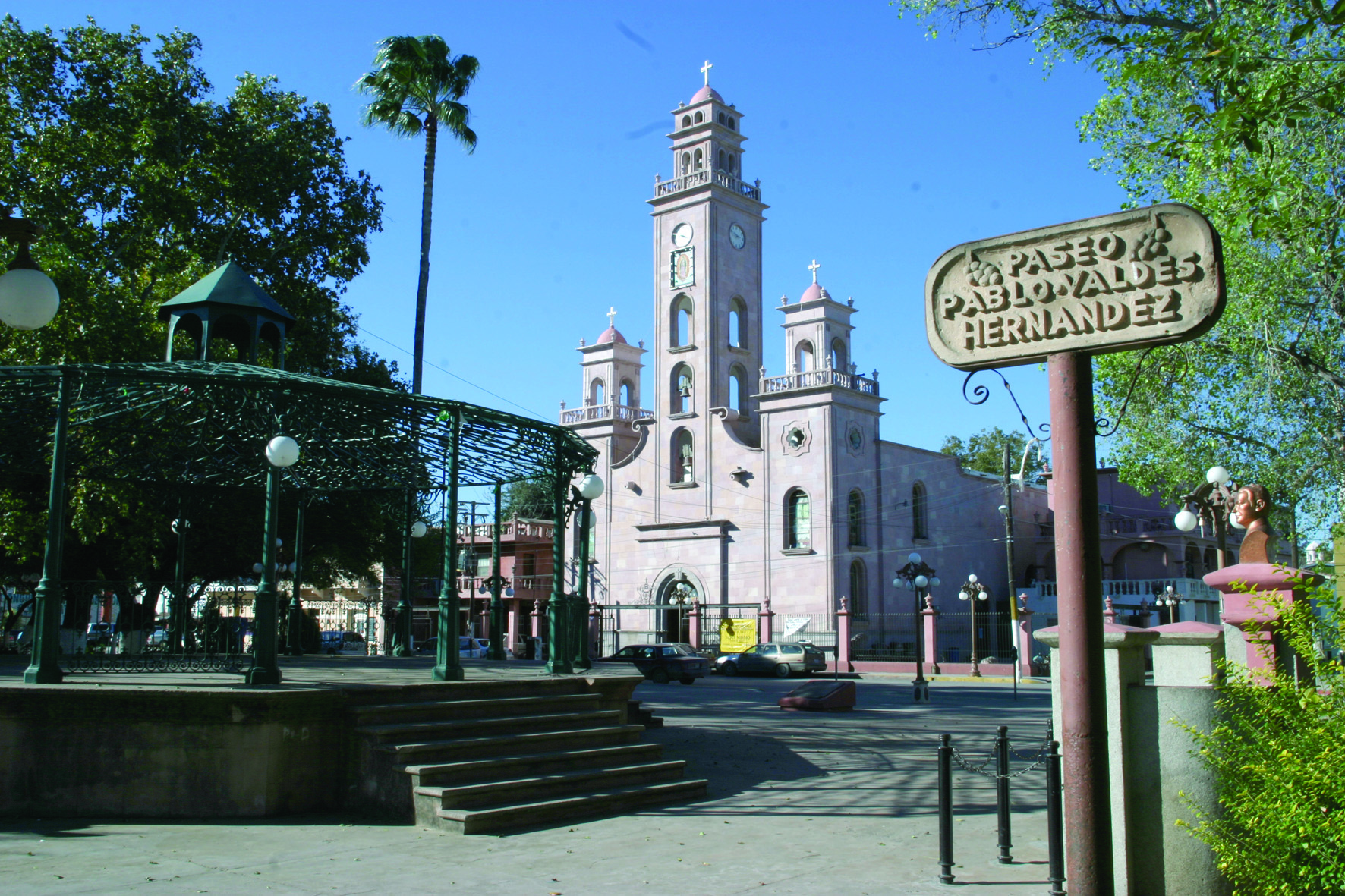
- National flag in the city; Universidad Autónoma de Piedras Negras; sign at Gran Plaza and Church of Our Lady of Guadalupe

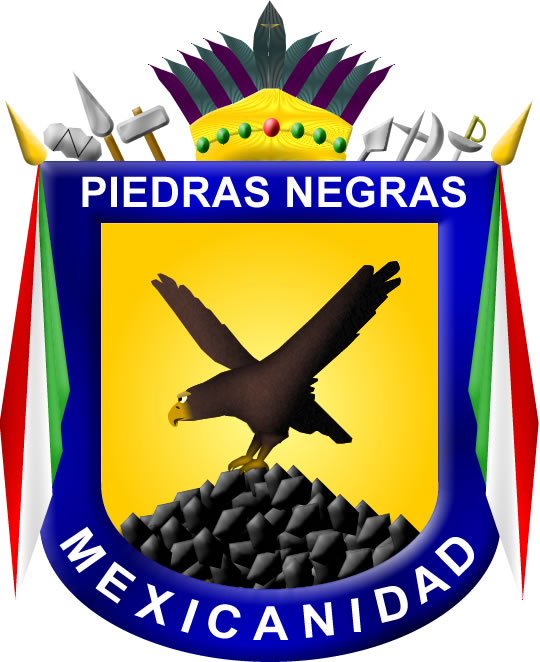
- Seal
- Nickname: The Safe Border!
- Location within Coahuila Location within Mexico
- Coordinates: 28°42′00″N 100°31′23″W
- Country: Mexico
- State: Coahuila
- Municipality: Piedras Negras
- Established: June 15, 1850

Government
  - Mayor: Carlos Jacobo Rodríguez González

Area
  - City: 914.2 km^{2} (353.0 sq mi)
- Elevation: 223 m (732 ft)

Population (2020)
  - City: 173,959
  - Metro: 245,155
- Demonym: Nigropetense
- Time zone: UTC–06:00 (Zona Centro)
  - Summer (DST): UTC–05:00 (DST)
- Postal code: 26000
- Area code: +52 878
- Airport: Piedras Negras Int. Airport
- Website: www.piedrasnegras.gob.mx

Piedras Negras (Spanish pronunciation: [ˈpjeðɾas ˈneɣɾas] lit. 'Black Rocks') is a city and seat of the surrounding municipality of the same name in the Mexican state of Coahuila. It stands at the northeastern edge of Coahuila on the Mexico–United States border, across the Rio Grande from Eagle Pass in the U.S. state of Texas.

In the 2015 census the city had a population of 163,595 inhabitants, while the metropolitan area had a population of 245,155 inhabitants. The Piedras Negras and the Eagle Pass areas are connected by the Eagle Pass–Piedras Negras International Bridge, Camino Real International Bridge, and the Union Pacific International Railroad Bridge.

In English, Piedras Negras translates to 'black stones' – a reference to coal deposits in the area. Across the river, coal was formerly mined on the U.S. side at Dolchburg, near Eagle Pass. This mine closed around 1905, after a fire. Mexico currently operates two large coal-fired power stations named "José López Portillo" and "Carbón 2" located 30 miles (48 km) south of Piedras Negras. These two coal-fired power plants are currently operated by Comisión Federal de Electricidad, the state-owned Mexican electric utility.

== History ==
On June 15, 1850, a group of 34 men (commanded by Andrés Zapata, Gaspar Salazar and Antonio Ramírez) met with Colonel Juan Manuel Maldonado to give the news that they had created a pass point at Piedras Negras, to the right of the Rio Grande, south of Fort Duncan. They named it Nueva Villa de Herrera, but it later became Villa de Piedras Negras. In Otto Schober's "Breve historia de Piedras Negras," the local historian points out that the 34 men were repatriates (Mexican Americans) who arrived on June 15, 1850, in what was then called "Colonia Militar de Guerrero en Piedras Negras."

In 1855, the town was looted by a small force of 130 Texans that had been organized by Texas slaveholders for a punitive expedition against a nearby border settlement the Texans claimed contained fugitive slaves and Native Americans. The force was led by a captain of the Texas Rangers. As it happened, the incursion was opposed and "repelled by a superior force of Negroes, Native Americans, and Mexicans who were waiting in ambush" inside Mexico. But the Ranger-led expedition then looted Piedras Negras while returning to Texas.

Following the discovery of huge deposits of coal in the region, in 1881 a railroad track was begun that was completed in 1883. The regional economy flourished and on December 1, 1888, it was granted city status; this time with the name of Ciudad Porfirio Díaz. After the fall of Diaz in 1911, the city reverted to being named Piedras Negras.

On April 26, 2004, flooding killed 31 people with up to 60 reported missing.

On April 24, 2007, an F4 tornado struck the city, killing three people there and seven in Eagle Pass, Texas.

From June 14–15, 2013 over 10,000 homes were damaged by flooding and one person was killed.

On the night of June 8, 2018, former Piedras Negras mayor Fernando Purón was shot in the back of the head by an unknown man while Purón was taking a selfie with an admirer. Purón died on the spot, becoming the 112th candidate or politician to be killed since Mexico's electoral campaign began in September 2017. Purón was supposed to run in the 2018 Mexican election on July 1 as a congressional candidate of the Institutional Revolutionary Party (PRI). Sonia Villarreal, current mayor of Piedras Negras and fellow member of PRI, suspended her mayoral reelection campaign in response to Purón's murder to concentrate on her current duties, stating that "We don't (want) his name to be just one more added to the list of candidates who have been victims of these deplorable acts."

== Geography ==
=== Demography ===
The Northern Region of Coahuila has approximately 300,000 inhabitants. According to the National Institute of Statistics, Geography and Data Processing (INEGI), in 2005 the population of the municipio of Piedras Negras was 143,915 inhabitants, equal to 5.77% of the population of Coahuila. 17% of the population of Piedras Negras came from other states, 3% were foreigners, and the rest were born in Coahuila. Piedras Negras has a high population growth due partly to its status as a border city fueled by U.S.-bound exports from several factories and also by persons who hope to cross the border into the United States. It is estimated that in a couple of years it will become the third most populated city of the state of Coahuila, surpassing Monclova. Nowadays Piedras Negras has more than 200,000 inhabitants.

=== Climate ===
Piedras Negras has a hot semi-arid climate, having some influences of the dry-winter humid subtropical climate (Cwa). During summer the temperatures often surpass 45 °C (113 °F). The hottest months are May through September with a daily average (mean) temperature between 26 °C (79 °F) and 31 °C (88 °F).

The high temperatures recorded in Piedras Negras have earned it recognition as one of the hottest cities in the country.

Highest precipitation months are May, June and September with an average monthly downfall in excess of 80 millimetres (3.1 in) but that is highly sporadic lending to frequent drought conditions. The period of lowest precipitation is between December through March, with a monthly average of 30 millimetres (1.2 in).

Climate data for Piedras Negras, Coahuila (1951–2010)
Month	Jan	Feb	Mar	Apr	May	Jun	Jul	Aug	Sep	Oct	Nov	Dec	Year
Record high °C (°F)	37.5 (99.5)	40.2 (104.4)	40.4 (104.7)	42.4 (108.3)	45.0 (113.0)	48.6 (119.5)	47.0 (116.6)	45.4 (113.7)	46.5 (115.7)	39.4 (102.9)	35.4 (95.7)	34.5 (94.1)	48.6 (119.5)
Mean daily maximum °C (°F)	19.6 (67.3)	22.0 (71.6)	26.2 (79.2)	30.7 (87.3)	34.3 (93.7)	37.3 (99.1)	38.2 (100.8)	38.4 (101.1)	35.5 (95.9)	29.8 (85.6)	23.5 (74.3)	20.2 (68.4)	29.6 (85.3)
Daily mean °C (°F)	12.2 (54.0)	14.7 (58.5)	18.6 (65.5)	22.9 (73.2)	27.2 (81.0)	30.1 (86.2)	31.0 (87.8)	31.2 (88.2)	28.4 (83.1)	22.8 (73.0)	16.5 (61.7)	12.8 (55.0)	22.4 (72.3)
Mean daily minimum °C (°F)	4.9 (40.8)	7.3 (45.1)	11.1 (52.0)	15.0 (59.0)	20.0 (68.0)	22.9 (73.2)	23.8 (74.8)	24.1 (75.4)	21.3 (70.3)	15.7 (60.3)	9.5 (49.1)	5.3 (41.5)	15.1 (59.2)
Record low °C (°F)	−10.0 (14.0)	−9.0 (15.8)	−7.0 (19.4)	−1.0 (30.2)	2.4 (36.3)	8.0 (46.4)	12.0 (53.6)	15.5 (59.9)	9.0 (48.2)	−3.0 (26.6)	−7.0 (19.4)	−8.0 (17.6)	−10.0 (14.0)
Average precipitation mm (inches)	19.1 (0.75)	16.7 (0.66)	27.5 (1.08)	49.6 (1.95)	69.6 (2.74)	56.0 (2.20)	59.3 (2.33)	52.6 (2.07)	73.2 (2.88)	75.2 (2.96)	25.9 (1.02)	13.4 (0.53)	538.1 (21.19)
Average precipitation days (≥ 0.1 mm)	5.2	5.3	4.2	4.5	5.5	4.0	4.2	4.2	4.9	6.0	4.4	3.7	56.1
Average relative humidity (%)	70	67	62	65	67	67	60	60	66	68	70	69	66
Mean monthly sunshine hours	150	182	199	234	298	243	285	267	289	276	165	143	2,731
Source 1: Servicio Meteorologico Nacional
Source 2: Deutscher Wetterdienst (sun, 1961–1990) (Note: Station ID for Piedras Negras is 76220 Use this station ID to locate the sunshine duration)

=== Natural resources ===
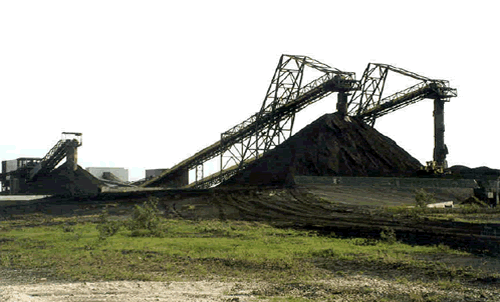
Coal used in the thermoelectric physical

This region generates a large amount of the national production of coal, one of the most economically important non-metallic minerals in the state.

== Piedras Negras in music, television, and film ==
- 1980: "Mi Piedras Negras," Frankie y los Matadores.
- 1992: "Safe Side," James McMurtry.
- 1993: Like Water for Chocolate
- 2004: "Joe Mark Arizmendi"
- 2007: No Country for Old Men (scene in the town square were filmed in Piedras Negras)
- 2016: From Dusk Till Dawn season 3
- May 27, 1902 – March 11, 1984: Gladys Pearl Monroe (also known as Gladys Pearl Monroe Baker Mortensen Eley) was the mother of American actress Marilyn Monroe. Gladys was born in Piedras Negras, Coahuila, Mexico. The town, previously called "Porfirio Díaz", is located across the border from Eagle Pass, Texas. (Gladys Pearl Baker - Wikipedia)

== Tourism ==
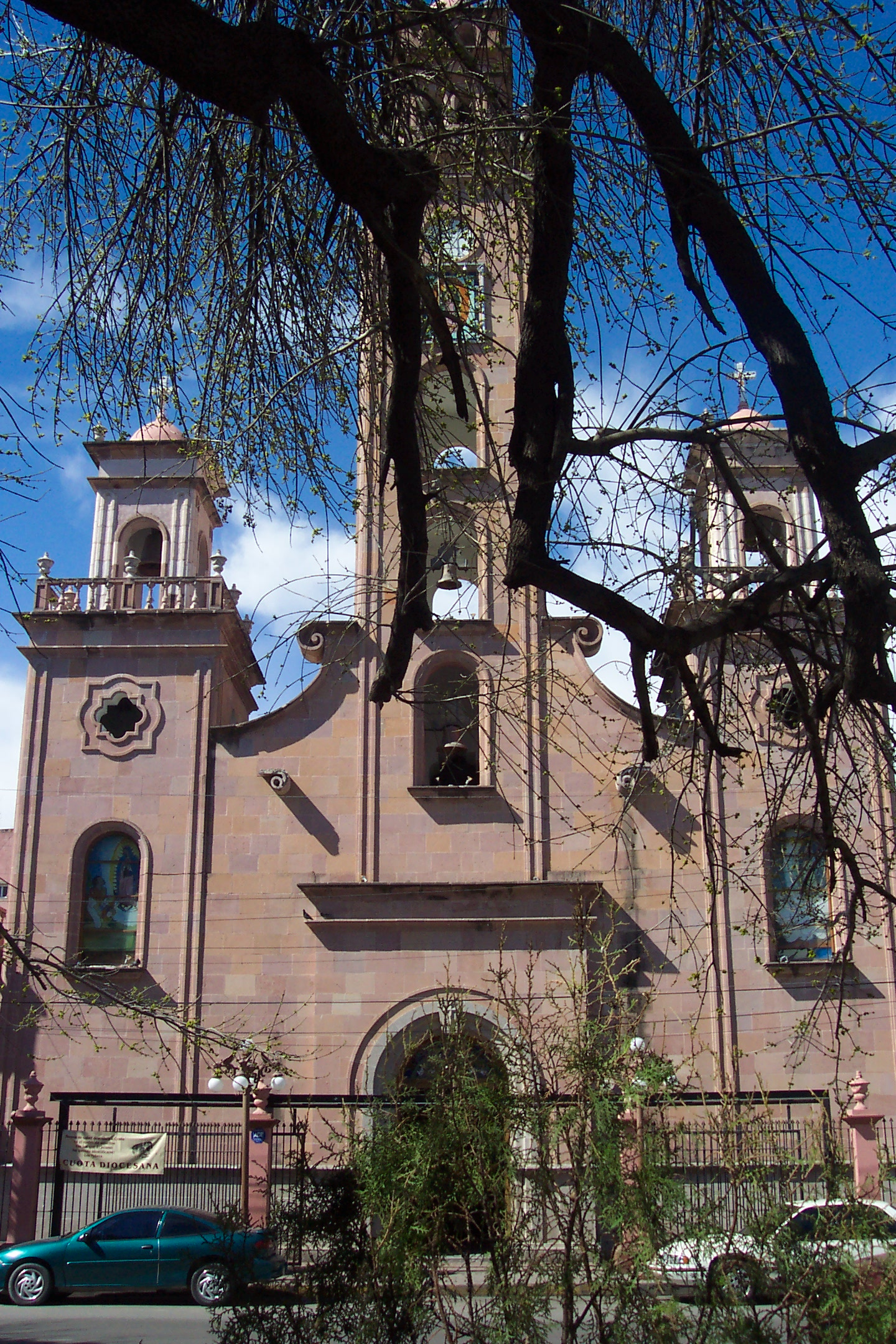
Church Our Lady of Guadalupe

Piedras Negras' main tourist attractions are:

- The Macro Plaza (Designed and Built by Cesar Dominguez, AIA, LEED AP) a large square surrounded by restaurants, shops and other businesses
- The ruins of San Bernardo Mission (18th century)
- The Handicrafts Museum
- The Culture House
- The Hunting and Fishing Club
- De La Ventana Caverns
- Mercado Zaragoza, known simply as El Mercado ("the Market"), a traditional Mexican market where one is able to buy a variety of hand-made arts and crafts from the state: vases, leatherworked items, clay and ceramic wares, as well as traditional Mexican candy from the region.
- El Santuario de Nuestra Señora de Guadalupe, Built in 1859 of ashlar, cement and wood, this church has survived the battles of the Cristero movement in 1927 and an explosion in 1934, leading to its renovation in 1935. The construction of its current towers began in 1950.
- Plaza de las Culturas (Cultures' Plaza), a new park completed in 2005. The Plaza is a homage to Mexico's three main indigenous cultures: Aztec, Mayan, and Olmec. It features a replica of a pyramid representative of the style of each of the cultures, the biggest one being a replica of the Pyramid of the Sun, located in Teotihuacan, near Mexico City.
- Estadio Piedras Negras
- Estadio Sección 123
- Catedral de Piedras Negras (Diócesis de Piedras Negras)
- Santuario de Nuestra Señora de Guadalupe (Built in 1859 of cement and wood, this sanctuary survived the Cristeros movements in 1927 and an explosion in 1934, it was remodeled in 1935. The construction of its towers began in 1950).
- Presidio militar de Monclova Viejo (1773 ruins)
- Casa Redonda o Maestranza (Where constitutionalist cannons were built)
- Antiguo Hotel del Ferrocarril (Ruinas)
- Antigua Presidencia Municipal (Soon to be Museo de la Frontera Norte)
- Plaza de las Culturas
- Plaza de Toros Monumental "Arizpe"
- Monumento a Venustiano Carranza (Blvd. Carranza)
- Monumento al Centenario de la Independencia (Inaugurated on September 16, 1910, by President Porfirio Díaz, located between the streets of Zaragoza and Fuentes, to be later transferred to the Central Square of Colonia Roma on July 15, 1963)
- Monumento a los Niños Héroes de Chapultepec (Macroplaza I)
- Monumento a las víctimas de la inundación del 04/04/04 y el tornado del 24/04/07 en Villa de Fuente
- Monumento al Venado Cola Blanca
- Monumento '"Héroes de Coahuila"
- Misión de San Bernardo (Guerrero, Coah. / 40 km de Piedras Negras)
- Casa de la Cultura
- Edificios de Telégrafos y Correos
- Edificio de la Universidad Autónoma de Piedras Negras
- Antigua Hacienda de San Isidro
- Centro de Desarrollo Comunitario Ejido Piedras Negras
- Centro de Desarrollo Comunitario Col. Presidentes
- Centro de Desarrollo Comunitario Col. Doctores
- Centro de Desarrollo Comunitario Col. Lazaro Cárdenas
- Centro Cultural Multimedia 2000
- Macroplaza I
- Macroplaza II
- Gran Bosque Urbano – El Vergel
- Teatro del IMSS (Hospital General de Zona #11)
- Teatro de la Ciudad "José Manuel Maldonado Maldonado"
- Auditorio de Piedras Negras
- La Gran Plaza
- Asta Bandera Monumental "Puente Internacional II" (50 m)
- Asta Bandera Monumental " La Gran Plaza" (120 m)
- Infoteca
- Museo del Niño "Chapulín" (En Construcción)
- Casa de las Artes
- Paseo del Río

== Transportation ==
Commercial air service is available via Aeropuerto Internacional de Piedras Negras.

== International Day of the Nacho ==
Much like the modern-day burrito was invented in Ciudad Juárez, nachos were invented in Piedras Negras. The International Day of the Nacho takes place every October 21. It and a three-day Nacho Fest was initiated in the 1990s in the United States and Mexico to commemorate the invention of nachos by Ignacio "Nacho" Anaya in 1943 at the Victory Club restaurant in Piedras Negras.

== Bike Fest ==
For 12 years in a row, the Annual Bike Fest has attracted visitors from Mexico and the United States. Activities last for 2–3 days and include concerts, food sales, acrobatic shows, a drive through town and a drawing with a brand new motorcycle as the grand prize. The 2016 prize was a Harley Davidson Sportster. The 2016 Bike Fest brought a revenue of Mex$1.5 million, roughly US$37,875.

== Local media ==
=== Newspapers ===
- Zócalo News
- Periódico La Voz (La Voz News)
- El Día News
- Revista Bravo!
- El Tranchete (tabloid)

=== Radio ===
- EXA FM 105.5
- Di-94.5 FM Dinámica Auditiva
- K93 FM (Eagle Pass, Texas)
- Súper Estelar 107.9 FM
- Recuerdo 96.7
- Amor 107 FM
- Romántica 99.9
- BACK FM 100.9 FM XHBM
- Radio Gente FM 102.5 XHPNC
- La Consentida 104.4 FM
- Fiesta Mexicana 106.3 FM XHPSP
- La Mexicana 1320 AM
- La Norteñita 830 AM XEIK
- Radio Popular Fronteriza S.A. 920 AM XEMJ
- La Rancherita del Aire 580 AM XEMU

=== Local television ===
- Televisa Piedras Negras (XHPN)
- TV Azteca Piedras Negras
- Super Channel 12.1/12.2
- Nu9ve Piedras Negras
- Multimedios TV Piedras Negras / Eagle Pass (XHAW)
- International Bridges Channel

=== Internet ===
- Internet Cablecom – Internet / Cable
- Infinitum by Telmex – Internet / Telephone

=== Internet local news ===
- Periódico Zócalo Sitio Web
- Agencia de Noticias INFONOR
- Agencia de Noticias SIP
- Coahuila en Línea
- Territorio de Coahuila y Texas
- ContraPunto Noticias

== Incidents ==
- On April 4, 2004, the Río Escondido (a tributary of the Río Bravo) broke its banks and some 36 residents of the Piedras Negras area were killed or vanished after the resulting flash floods.
- In 2007, a tornado hit both Piedras Negras and Eagle Pass on April 24, killing three people in Piedras Negras and seven people in Eagle Pass. Several others were injured and homeless in both communities. See also Piedras Negras-Eagle Pass Tornadoes
- On Monday, September 17, 2012, at least 30, and possibly more than 100, inmates broke out of a prison here, near the U.S.-Mexico border, by digging a tunnel from the prison's carpentry section.

=== Religious centers ===
- Piedras Negras Cathedral (Diocese of Piedras Negras)
- Bishopric of Piedras Negras
- Shrine of Our Lady of Guadalupe
- Parish of Christ the King
- Parish of Our Lady of San Juan de Los Lagos
- Parish of La Sagrada Familia
- Parish of San Antonio de Padua
- Parish of the Sacred Heart of Jesus (Bravo)
- Parish of the Sacred Heart of Jesus (Villa de Fuente)
- Parish of Our Lady of Perpetual Help
- Recroria of Our Lady of Fatima
- Rectory of Our Lady of Carmen
- Rectory San Martin de Porres
- Methodist Church of Mexico "San Pablo", "Hallelujah", "King of Kings", among others
- Living Water Fountains
- Praise Center
- Anglican Church of Mexico A.R. "The Good Shepherd" and "The Resurrection
- The Church of Jesus Christ of Latter-day Saints
- Among many others...

=== Sports centers ===
- Piedras Negras Stadium
- Stadium Section 123
- Gym "Santiago V. González"
- Municipal Gymnasium 'Beto Estrada'
- Aquatic Center of Piedras Negras
- Macroplaza II
- River Walk
- Sports Unit 'Santiago V. González'
- Sports Unit 'Guadalupe Rivas'
- Sports Unit 'MICARE'
- Sports Unit 'Víctor M. Rueda'
- Among others...

=== Local parties ===
- Fair of the Sun (September / October)
- Bike Fest (May and June)
- Livestock Fair (June)
- International Festival of Nacho (October)
- La Polvareda (April / May): Mountain Bike Race

== Economy ==
Piedras Negras belongs to the North economic region of Coahuila. According to INEGI data, the secondary and services sectors occupy almost the entire occupied population, while the primary sector occupies an almost zero percentage. The maquiladora industry employs almost 10,000 people in the municipality (about 25% of the Occupied Population), mainly engaged in the manufacture of automotive parts, electronic components and textiles.

- José López Portillo Thermoelectric Power Plant

The José López Portillo Thermoelectric Power Plant of the Federal Electricity Commission has an effective installed capacity of 1200 MW in four generating units of 300 MW each. The CTJLP is located a de Piedras Negras by the national road 57 and its infrastructure can be seen from different points of the city of piedras negras being an icon of the municipality of Nava.

This central is interconnected to the National System through 2 lines of 230 kV and 2 lines of 400 kV which are directed towards Arroyo el Coyote de Nuevo Laredo Tamaulipas and towards The Coal Frontier in Ciudad Frontera Coahuila respectively.

La Central proudly hires directly and indirectly from the region where Piedras Negras, Nava, Morelos and Allende are located, Coahuila mainly.

The main features of the plant are its coal management systems, bottom ash handling and steering wheel and its cooling system whose water is transported through an aqueduct from the Rio Bravo to its pond, traveling.

The average annual generation achieved is 9,200,000 MWH with a coal consumption of 5,300,000 t and an availability of more than 90%, thus being among the best nationally which has earned it several recognitions for its efficiency in the national system.

- Coal Thermoelectric Power Plant II

Located in Nava, the Coal Thermoelectric Plant II is the second large-scale power plant built in Mexico to use non-coking mineral coal as a primary source of energy. It is part of the Northern Regional Production Management and delivers the generated energy to the Northeast Control Area through the 400 kV Lampazos I and II transmission lines, as well as a link to the Rio Escondido substation at the same voltage level.

The Central has four generating units with a capacity of 350,000 kW each, for a total of 1,400,000 kW. So it is currently the largest coal-fired thermoelectric plant in Latin America. annually delivers a generation of 10,300,000 MWh. Reflecting the great commitment of the staff of this Central, it is currently certified by different national and international bodies. Another important industrial branch is automotive metal, specialized in the manufacture of parts for suspension, which has been a fundamental pillar in the economy of the region, employing more than 2,000 people.

Other important sources of employment in the region are the coal and coal 2 thermoelectric plants, Minera Carbonífera Río Escondido (MICARE) and the Coca-Cola plant (all in the municipality of Nava, conurbado with the city of Piedras Negras). In the municipality there are 6 industrial parks, which have services of drinking water, drainage, electric power, telephone and public lighting:

- Rio Grande Industrial Park
- Piedras Negras Industrial Park
- Friendship Piedras Negras I and II Industrial Park
- Santo Domingo Industrial Park
- Airport Business Industrial Park
- Northern Industrial Park

Some incentives currently offered by the municipality for the installation of new companies are:

- Exemption from property tax for 3 years.
- Exemption in the payment of permits and licenses necessary for your operation.
- Exemption in the payment of building licenses.
- Support and management before service companies.

=== Workmanship ===
The workforce is specialized in the automotive, textile and electronics branches. Most of the workforce is owned by the Mexican Workers' CTM, CROC and SUTERM. According to the BlackStones Maquiladora Industry Salary Survey, the daily wage for a general worker as of January 2006 was $47.85 to $87.60 while for an average command it is $173.91 to $205.00.

According to statistics IMSS, the affiliated workers of the municipality have an average salary of 4'15 S.M. (Zone C, $45.81), which is relatively high compared to other cities such as Saltillo, with 4'75 S.M. or Torreón (Coahuila de Zaragoza), with 3'40 S.M. Approximately 20% of the Economically Active Population receives more than 5 S.M., while 21% receive an income of 3 to 5 S.M. The rest get less than 3 S.M.

== Sister cities ==
Piedras Negras has two sister cities, as designated by Sister Cities International:

- Sandy, Utah, United States
- Monterrey, Mexico
