= El Paso–Las Cruces combined statistical area =

Combined Statistical Area

Coordinates: 32.276°N 106.768°W

El Paso–Las Cruces, TX–NM El Paso–Las Cruces, Texas–New Mexico Combined Statistical Area
- Metropolitan Area
El Paso–Las Cruces, Texas–New Mexico CSA
El Paso, TX MSA
Las Cruces, NM MSA
City of El Paso
City of Las Cruces
- Country: United States
- State: Texas; New Mexico
- Largest city: El Paso
- Other cities: Las Cruces
- Time zone: UTC−7 (MST)
  - Summer (DST): UTC−6 (MDT)

The El Paso–Las Cruces combined statistical area consists of two counties in western Texas and one in southern New Mexico. This CSA was defined as part of the United States Office of Management and Budget's 2013 delineations for metropolitan, micropolitan, and combined statistical areas. As of the 2024 United States Census Estimate, the El Paso-Las Cruces CSA had a population of 1,108,758 making it the 56th largest combined statistical area in the United States. The statistical area consists of the metropolitan areas of El Paso, Texas and Las Cruces, New Mexico. This CSA has a GDP of about $33 billion and would rank 58th nationally among all CSA or metro areas. The total land area of the El Paso–Las Cruces combined statistical area is 9,402 sq. mi.

== Counties ==
- Doña Ana County, New Mexico
- El Paso County, Texas
- Hudspeth County, Texas

== Communities ==
=== El Paso County ===
- Agua Dulce, Texas
- Anthony, Texas (City)
- Butterfield, Texas
- Canutillo, Texas
- Clint, Texas
- Fabens, Texas
- Fort Bliss, Texas
- Homestead Meadows North, Texas
- Homestead Meadows South, Texas
- El Paso, Texas (Principal city)
- Horizon City, Texas (City)
- Montana Vista, Texas
- Morning Glory, Texas
- Newman, Texas
- Prado Verde, Texas
- San Elizario, Texas (City)
- Socorro, Texas (City)
- Tornillo, Texas
- Vinton, Texas
- Westway, Texas

=== Doña Ana County ===
- Anthony, New Mexico (City)
- Chamberino, New Mexico
- Chaparral, New Mexico
- Doña Ana, New Mexico
- Hatch, New Mexico
- La Mesa, New Mexico
- Las Cruces, New Mexico (Principal city)
- Mesilla, New Mexico
- Mesquite, New Mexico
- Organ, New Mexico
- Picacho, Dona Ana County, New Mexico
- Radium Springs, New Mexico
- Rincon, New Mexico
- Salem, New Mexico
- Santa Teresa, New Mexico
- Sunland Park, New Mexico (City)
- University Park, New Mexico
- Vado, New Mexico
- White Sands, New Mexico

=== Hudspeth County ===
- Allamoore, Texas
- Dell City, Texas
- Salt Flat, Texas
- Sierra Blanca, Texas

== See also ==
- List of metropolitan areas in New Mexico
- List of metropolitan areas in Texas
