= Texas's 23rd congressional district =

U.S. House district for Texas

Coordinates: 30°23′21″N 102°19′36″W

- Interactive map of district boundaries
- Representative: Vacant
- Distribution: 78.09% urban; 21.91% rural
- Population (2025): 816,686
- Median household income: $87,100
- Ethnicity: 62.9% Hispanic; 28.4% White; 3.3% Black; 2.4% Asian; 2.1% Two or more races; 0.8% other
- Cook PVI: R+7

Texas's 23rd congressional district stretches across the southwestern portion of Texas. It is a majority Hispanic district and has been vacant since Representative Tony Gonzales resigned in April 2026.

The 23rd district runs along the majority of Texas's border with Mexico, north of the Rio Grande. It stretches from western San Antonio to El Paso, encompassing numerous county seats and towns of regional economic importance.

The district is predominantly rural, with most of its population concentrated in San Antonio's western suburbs. Campaigning is difficult due to its size and disparate influences; the population density is one of the lowest in any congressional district. Economic activities include farming, ranching, oil, and mineral extraction; also recreation, manufacturing, and tourism, as it encompasses all of Big Bend National Park and Big Bend Ranch State Park.

== Recent election results from statewide races ==
=== 2023–2027 boundaries ===
Year	Office	Results
2008	President	McCain 53% - 46%
2012	President	Romney 56% - 44%
2014	Senate	Cornyn 65% - 35%
2014	Governor	Abbott 61% - 39%
2016	President	Trump 50% - 45%
2018	Senate	Cruz 51% - 49%
2018	Governor	Abbott 56% - 42%
2018	Lt. Governor	Patrick 52% - 46%
2018	Attorney General	Paxton 50% - 47%
2018	Comptroller of Public Accounts	Hegar 52% - 44%
2020	President	Trump 53% - 46%
2020	Senate	Cornyn 54% - 43%
2022	Governor	Abbott 54% - 44%
2022	Lt. Governor	Patrick 54% - 43%
2022	Attorney General	Paxton 53% - 44%
2022	Comptroller of Public Accounts	Hegar 56% - 41%
2024	President	Trump 57% - 42%
2024	Senate	Cruz 53% - 44%

=== 2027–2033 boundaries ===
Year	Office	Results
2008	President	McCain 56% - 43%
2012	President	Romney 58% - 42%
2014	Senate	Cornyn 67% - 33%
2014	Governor	Abbott 63% - 37%
2016	President	Trump 51% - 44%
2018	Senate	Cruz 51% - 48%
2018	Governor	Abbott 57% - 41%
2018	Lt. Governor	Patrick 52% - 45%
2018	Attorney General	Paxton 51% - 46%
2018	Comptroller of Public Accounts	Hegar 54% - 42%
2020	President	Trump 53% - 46%
2020	Senate	Cornyn 54% - 43%
2022	Governor	Abbott 54% - 44%
2022	Lt. Governor	Patrick 54% - 43%
2022	Attorney General	Paxton 53% - 44%
2022	Comptroller of Public Accounts	Hegar 56% - 41%
2024	President	Trump 57% - 42%
2024	Senate	Cruz 53% - 45%
2026	Senate	Talarico 55% - 41%
2026	Governor	Hinojosa 54% - 45%

== Current composition ==
For the 118th and successive Congresses (based on redistricting following the 2020 census), the district contains all or portions of the following counties and communities:

Bexar County (12)

Cross Mountain, Fair Oaks Ranch, Grey Forest, Helotes, Lackland AFB, Macdona, San Antonio (part; also 20th, 21st, 28th, 35th; shared with Comal and Medina counties), Scenic Oaks, Shavano Park, Somerset, Timberwood Park, Von Ormy

Brewster County (4)

All 4 communities

Crane County (1)

Crane

Crockett County (1)

Ozona

Culberson County (1)

Van Horn

Dimmit County (6)

All 6 communities

Edwards County (2)

Barksdale, Rocksprings

El Paso County (13)

Agua Dulce, Butterfield, Clint, El Paso (part; also 16th), Fabens, Fort Bliss (part; also 16th), Homestead Meadows North, Homestead Meadows South, Horizon City (part; also 16th), Morning Glory, San Elizario, Socorro (part; also 16th), Tornillo

Frio County (6)

All 6 communities

Hudspeth County (4)

All 4 communities

Jeff Davis County (2)

Fort Davis, Valentine

Kinney County (3)

All 3 communities

La Salle County (3)

All 3 communities

Loving County (1)

Mentone

Maverick County (13)

All 13 communities

Medina County (9)

All 9 communities

Pecos County (5)

All 5 communities

Presidio County (3)

All 3 communities

Reagan County (1)

Big Lake

Schleicher County (1)

Eldorado

Sutton County (1)

Sonora

Terrell County (1)

Sanderson

Upton County (2)

McCamey, Rankin

Uvalde County (5)

All 5 communities

Val Verde County (7)

All 7 communities

Ward County (7)

All 7 communities

Winkler County (3)

All 3 communities

Zavala County (6)

All 6 communities

== Future composition ==
Beginning with the 2026 election, the 23rd district will consist of the following counties:

- Bexar (part)
- Brewster
- Crane
- Crockett
- Culberson
- Edwards
- El Paso (part)
- Frio
- Hudspeth
- Jeff Davis
- Kinney
- Loving
- Maverick (part)
- Medina
- Pecos
- Presidio
- Reagan
- Reeves
- Schleicher
- Sutton
- Terrell
- Upton
- Uvalde
- Val Verde
- Ward
- Winkler
- Zavala

== Demographics ==
According to the APM Research Lab's Voter Profile Tools (featuring the U.S. Census Bureau's 2019 American Community Survey), the district contained about 511,000 potential voters (citizens, age 18+). Of these, 64% are Latino, while 29% are White. One in ten potential voters were born outside of the U.S., now naturalized citizens. Median income among households (with one or more potential voter) in the district is about $61,800, while 11% of households live below the poverty line. As for the educational attainment of potential voters in the district, 17% of those 25 and older have not earned a high school degree, while 23% hold a bachelor's or higher degree.

== List of members representing the district ==
Member	Party	Years	Cong ress	Electoral history	District location
District established January 3, 1967
Abraham Kazen Jr. (Laredo)	Democratic	January 3, 1967 – January 3, 1985	90th 91st 92nd 93rd 94th 95th 96th 97th 98th	Elected in 1966. Re-elected in 1968. Re-elected in 1970. Re-elected in 1972. Re-elected in 1974. Re-elected in 1976. Re-elected in 1978. Re-elected in 1980. Re-elected in 1982. Lost renomination.	1967–1969; Atascosa, Bee, De Witt, Dimmit, Duval, Frio, Gonzales, Guadalupe, Jim Wells, Karnes, La Salle, Lavaca, Maverick, McMullen, Medina, Webb, Wilson, and Zavala; parts of Bexar
Abraham Kazen Jr. (Laredo)	Democratic	January 3, 1967 – January 3, 1985	90th 91st 92nd 93rd 94th 95th 96th 97th 98th	Elected in 1966. Re-elected in 1968. Re-elected in 1970. Re-elected in 1972. Re-elected in 1974. Re-elected in 1976. Re-elected in 1978. Re-elected in 1980. Re-elected in 1982. Lost renomination.	1969–1973; Atascosa, Bee, De Witt, Dimmit, Duval, Frio, Goliad, Gonzales, Guadalupe, Jim Wells, Karnes, La Salle, Lavaca, Live Oak, Maverick, McMullen, Medina, Webb, Wilson, and Zavala; parts of Bexar
Abraham Kazen Jr. (Laredo)	Democratic	January 3, 1967 – January 3, 1985	90th 91st 92nd 93rd 94th 95th 96th 97th 98th	Elected in 1966. Re-elected in 1968. Re-elected in 1970. Re-elected in 1972. Re-elected in 1974. Re-elected in 1976. Re-elected in 1978. Re-elected in 1980. Re-elected in 1982. Lost renomination.	1973–1975; Atascosa, Bee, De Witt, Dimmit, Frio, Goliad, Gonzales, Guadalupe, Karnes, La Salle, Lavaca, Maverick, Medina, Webb, Wilson, and Zavala; parts of Bexar
Abraham Kazen Jr. (Laredo)	Democratic	January 3, 1967 – January 3, 1985	90th 91st 92nd 93rd 94th 95th 96th 97th 98th	Elected in 1966. Re-elected in 1968. Re-elected in 1970. Re-elected in 1972. Re-elected in 1974. Re-elected in 1976. Re-elected in 1978. Re-elected in 1980. Re-elected in 1982. Lost renomination.	1975–1983; Atascosa, De Witt, Dimmit, Frio, Goliad, Guadalupe, Karnes, La Salle, Lavaca, Maverick, Webb, Wilson, and Zavala; parts of Bee, Bexar, Caldwell, Gonzales, and Medina
Abraham Kazen Jr. (Laredo)	Democratic	January 3, 1967 – January 3, 1985	90th 91st 92nd 93rd 94th 95th 96th 97th 98th	Elected in 1966. Re-elected in 1968. Re-elected in 1970. Re-elected in 1972. Re-elected in 1974. Re-elected in 1976. Re-elected in 1978. Re-elected in 1980. Re-elected in 1982. Lost renomination.	1983–1985; Dimmit, Kinney, Maverick, Medina, Uvalde, Webb, and Zavala; parts of Bexar
Albert Bustamante (San Antonio)	Democratic	January 3, 1985 – January 3, 1993	99th 100th 101st 102nd	Elected in 1984. Re-elected in 1986. Re-elected in 1988. Re-elected in 1990. Lost re-election.	1985–1993; Dimmit, Kinney, Maverick, Medina, Uvalde, Val Verde, Webb, and Zavala; parts of Bexar
Henry Bonilla (San Antonio)	Republican	January 3, 1993 – January 3, 2007	103rd 104th 105th 106th 107th 108th 109th	Elected in 1992. Re-elected in 1994. Re-elected in 1996. Re-elected in 1998. Re-elected in 2000. Re-elected in 2002. Re-elected in 2004. Lost re-election.	1993–2003; Brewster, Crane, Crockett, Culberson, Dimmit, Edwards, Hudspeth, Jeff Davis, Kinney, Loving, Maverick, Medina, Pecos, Presidio, Reagan, Reeves, Sutton, Terrell, Upton, Uvalde, Val Verde, Ward, Webb, Winkler, and Zavala; parts of Bexar, Ector, El Paso, and Midland
Henry Bonilla (San Antonio)	Republican	January 3, 1993 – January 3, 2007	103rd 104th 105th 106th 107th 108th 109th	Elected in 1992. Re-elected in 1994. Re-elected in 1996. Re-elected in 1998. Re-elected in 2000. Re-elected in 2002. Re-elected in 2004. Lost re-election.	2003–2005; Brewster, Crockett, Culberson, Dimmit, Edwards, Hudspeth, Jeff Davis, Kinney, Maverick, Medina, Pecos, Presidio, Reagan, Real, Reeves, Sutton, Terrell, Upton, Uvalde, Val Verde, Webb, and Zavala; parts of Bexar and El Paso
Henry Bonilla (San Antonio)	Republican	January 3, 1993 – January 3, 2007	103rd 104th 105th 106th 107th 108th 109th	Elected in 1992. Re-elected in 1994. Re-elected in 1996. Re-elected in 1998. Re-elected in 2000. Re-elected in 2002. Re-elected in 2004. Lost re-election.	2005–2007 Bandera, Brewster, Crockett, Culberson, Dimmit, Edwards, Hudspeth, Jeff Davis, Kendall, Kerr, Kinney, Maverick, Medina, Pecos, Presidio, Real, Reeves, Terrell, Uvalde, Val Verde, and Zavala; parts of Bexar, El Paso, Sutton, and Webb
Ciro Rodriguez (San Antonio)	Democratic	January 3, 2007 – January 3, 2011	110th 111th	Elected in 2006. Re-elected in 2008. Lost re-election.	2007–2013 Brewster, Crockett, Culberson, Dimmit, Edwards, Hudspeth, Jeff Davis, Kinney, Maverick, Medina, Pecos, Presidio, Reeves, Terrell, Uvalde, Val Verde, and Zavala; parts of Bexar, El Paso, and Sutton
Quico Canseco (San Antonio)	Republican	January 3, 2011 – January 3, 2013	112th	Elected in 2010. Lost re-election.	2007–2013 Brewster, Crockett, Culberson, Dimmit, Edwards, Hudspeth, Jeff Davis, Kinney, Maverick, Medina, Pecos, Presidio, Reeves, Terrell, Uvalde, Val Verde, and Zavala; parts of Bexar, El Paso, and Sutton
Pete Gallego (Alpine)	Democratic	January 3, 2013 – January 3, 2015	113th	Elected in 2012. Lost re-election.	2013–2023 Brewster, Crane, Crockett, Culberson, Dimmit, Edwards, Frio, Hudspeth, Jeff Davis, Kinney, Loving, Maverick, Medina, Pecos, Presidio, Reagan, Reeves, Schleicher, Sutton, Terrell, Upton, Uvalde, Val Verde, Ward, Winkler, and Zavala; parts of Bexar, El Paso, and La Salle
Will Hurd (San Antonio)	Republican	January 3, 2015 – January 3, 2021	114th 115th 116th	Elected in 2014. Re-elected in 2016. Re-elected in 2018. Retired.	2013–2023 Brewster, Crane, Crockett, Culberson, Dimmit, Edwards, Frio, Hudspeth, Jeff Davis, Kinney, Loving, Maverick, Medina, Pecos, Presidio, Reagan, Reeves, Schleicher, Sutton, Terrell, Upton, Uvalde, Val Verde, Ward, Winkler, and Zavala; parts of Bexar, El Paso, and La Salle
Tony Gonzales (San Antonio)	Republican	January 3, 2021 – April 14, 2026	117th 118th 119th	Elected in 2020. Re-elected in 2022. Re-elected in 2024. Resigned.	2013–2023 Brewster, Crane, Crockett, Culberson, Dimmit, Edwards, Frio, Hudspeth, Jeff Davis, Kinney, Loving, Maverick, Medina, Pecos, Presidio, Reagan, Reeves, Schleicher, Sutton, Terrell, Upton, Uvalde, Val Verde, Ward, Winkler, and Zavala; parts of Bexar, El Paso, and La Salle
Tony Gonzales (San Antonio)	Republican	January 3, 2021 – April 14, 2026	117th 118th 119th	Elected in 2020. Re-elected in 2022. Re-elected in 2024. Resigned.	2023–2027 Bexar (part), Brewster, Crane, Crockett, Culberson, Dimmit, Edwards, El Paso (part), Frio, Hudspeth, Jeff Davis, Kinney, La Salle, Loving, Maverick, Medina, Pecos, Presidio, Reagan, Reeves, Schleicher, Sutton, Terrell, Upton, Uvalde, Val Verde, Ward, Winkler, and Zavala
Vacant		April 14, 2026 – present	119th		2023–2027 Bexar (part), Brewster, Crane, Crockett, Culberson, Dimmit, Edwards, El Paso (part), Frio, Hudspeth, Jeff Davis, Kinney, La Salle, Loving, Maverick, Medina, Pecos, Presidio, Reagan, Reeves, Schleicher, Sutton, Terrell, Upton, Uvalde, Val Verde, Ward, Winkler, and Zavala
Katy Padilla Stout (Leon Springs)	Democratic	Assuming office on January 3, 2027		Elected in 2026.	

== Election results ==
=== Elections from 1967 to 1992 ===
This district was created in 1967, following passage of the Voting Rights Act of 1965. In addition, it followed the case of Wesberry v. Sanders, resulting in Texas's previous congressional map being tossed out. Democrats held the district until 1993.

=== Elections from 1992 to 2002 ===
Following the 1990 census, in 1992, the Texas Legislature created the new 28th district, mostly from the eastern portion of the 23rd. In the process, the legislature left a heavily Republican section of western San Antonio in the 23rd. Republican Henry Bonilla beat 4-term incumbent Albert Bustamante to take the seat in 1992.

Although the 23rd leaned slightly Democratic on paper, Bonilla had a very conservative voting record. Largely because of his popularity in San Antonio, he did not face a credible challenger until 2002, when the former Democratic Texas Secretary of State, Henry Cuellar, came within 2 points of unseating him.

=== 2004 election ===
During the 2003 Texas redistricting, the Republican-controlled Texas Legislature shifted most of Laredo, which had been one of the bases of the 23rd from the beginning, into the 28th district. Several heavily Republican suburbs in the Texas Hill Country north of San Antonio were shifted into the 23rd district, all but ensuring Bonilla of a seventh term.

2004 Texas's 23rd congressional district election
Party	Candidate	Votes	%	±%
Republican	Henry Bonilla (incumbent)	170,716	69.3	+17.7
Democratic	Joe Sullivan	72,480	29.4	−17.8
Libertarian	Nazirite Perez	3,307	1.3	+0.6
Majority		98,236	39.9	
Turnout		246,503		
Republican hold		Swing	+17.8	

=== 2006 election ===
Following the U.S. Supreme Court ruling in League of United Latin American Citizens v. Perry which found that the 23rd district violated the Voting Rights Act of 1965, the district was redrawn.

2006 Texas's 23rd congressional district runoff election
Party	Candidate	Votes	%	±%
Democratic	Ciro Rodriguez	38,247	54.32%	+25.1
Republican	Henry Bonilla (Incumbent)	32,165	45.68%	−23.9
Majority		6,082	8.64%	
Turnout		68,294		
Democratic gain from Republican		Swing	24.5	

=== 2010 election ===
The National Republican Congressional Committee targeted Texas's 23rd congressional district to try to regain it, and strongly supported the Republican campaign financially.

2010 Texas's 23rd congressional district election
Party	Candidate	Votes	%	±%
Republican	Quico Canseco	74,671	49.38	
Democratic	Ciro Rodriguez (incumbent)	67,212	44.44	
Majority				
Turnout		141,883		
Republican gain from Democratic		Swing		

=== 2012 election ===
2012 Texas's 23rd congressional district election
Party	Candidate	Votes	%
Democratic	Pete Gallego	96,477	50.33
Republican	Quico Canseco (incumbent)	87,255	45.52
Libertarian	Jeffrey C. Blunt	5,827	3.04
Green	Ed Scharf	2,099	1.09
Total votes		191,658	100

=== 2014 election ===
2014 Texas's 23rd congressional district election
Party	Candidate	Votes	%
Republican	Will Hurd	57,459	49.8
Democratic	Pete Gallego (incumbent)	55,037	47.7
Libertarian	Ruben Corvalan	2,933	2.5
Total votes		115,429	100

=== 2016 election ===
2016 Texas's 23rd congressional district election
Party	Candidate	Votes	%
Republican	Will Hurd (incumbent)	110,577	48.3
Democratic	Pete Gallego	107,526	47.0
Libertarian	Ruben Corvalan	10,862	4.7
Total votes		228,965	100

=== 2018 election ===
2018 Texas's 23rd congressional district election
Party	Candidate	Votes	%
Republican	Will Hurd (incumbent)	103,285	49.2
Democratic	Gina Ortiz Jones	102,359	48.7
Libertarian	Ruben Corvalan	4,425	2.1
Total votes		210,069	100.0
Republican hold			

=== 2020 election ===
2020 Texas's 23rd congressional district election
Party	Candidate	Votes	%
Republican	Tony Gonzales	149,395	50.6
Democratic	Gina Ortiz Jones	137,693	46.6
Libertarian	Beto Villela	8,369	2.8
Total votes		295,457	100
Republican hold			

=== 2022 election ===
2022 Texas's 23rd congressional district election
Party	Candidate	Votes	%
Republican	Tony Gonzales (incumbent)	116,649	55.8
Democratic	John Lira	80,947	38.7
Independent	Frank Lopez Jr.	11,180	5.3
Total votes		208,776	100
Republican hold			

=== 2024 election ===
2024 Texas's 23rd congressional district election
Party	Candidate	Votes	%
Republican	Tony Gonzales (incumbent)	180,720	62.30
Democratic	Santos Limon	109,373	37.70
Total votes		290,093	100.00
Republican hold			

=== 2026 election ===
2026 Texas's 23rd congressional district election
Party	Candidate	Votes	%	±%
Democratic	Katy Padilla Stout	142,116	52.14%	+14.3
Republican	Brandon Herrera	119,822	43.96%	−19.2
Independent	Ben Mendoza	10,615	3.89%	+3.9
Majority		22,914	8.14%	
Turnout		272,553		
Democratic gain from Republican		Swing	16.75%	

== See also ==
- List of United States congressional districts
