= Mary González =

Texas state legislator

Mary Edna González

Member of the Texas House of Representatives from the 75th district
- Incumbent
- Assumed office January 8, 2013
- Preceded by: Chente Quintanilla

Personal details
- Born: October 30, 1983 (age 42) Clint, Texas, U.S.
- Party: Democratic
- Education: University of Texas at Austin; St. Edward's University
- Committees: Appropriations; Agriculture and Livestock
- Website: Campaign website

Mary Edna González (born October 30, 1983) is an American politician who serves in the Texas House of Representatives from House District 75. She is a member of the Democratic Party and was elected in November 2012 to represent an area that includes eastern El Paso County, parts of the city of El Paso and the towns of Socorro, Clint, Fabens, Horizon City, San Elizario and Tornillo. She is also the first openly pansexual elected official in the United States.

Her primary platforms are to increase economic development, improve public schools, equality, and support agriculture in District 75.

== Early life and education ==
Mary González was born and raised in Clint, Texas and graduated from Clint High School. González received her bachelor's degree in History and Mexican American Studies from the University of Texas at Austin (UT Austin) and her master's degree in Social Justice from St. Edward's University. In 2019, she received her doctoral degree in Curriculum and Instruction-Cultural Studies in Education from the University of Texas at Austin.

== Previous work ==
Early in her career, González worked for former Texas House Dean Paul Moreno and State Representative Richard Raymond.

Mary González has also worked at the National Hispanic Institute, UT Austin, and was the assistant dean for student multicultural affairs at Southwestern University. She has also worked as a visiting instructor at Southwestern University, and a Graduate Research Assistant at UT Austin where she developed curriculum for the UT Outreach Centers in San Antonio and the Rio Grande Valley. She also served as the Latino Outreach Coordinator for the Texas Democratic Party.

She served as national president for the Latina-based, service sorority Kappa Delta Chi, from 2013 to 2015. González is also Co-Chair of the board of directors for ALLGO, Texas' statewide Queer People of Color organization.

== Political career ==
=== Texas House of Representatives ===
González won the Democratic primary for House District 75 in May 2012. With no Republican opponent, she won in the general election unopposed, becoming the first woman to represent her district.

During the 85th legislative session, González served on the House Committee on Appropriations and was Vice Chair of the House Committee on Agriculture & Livestock.

During the 86th legislative session, González again served on the House Committee on Appropriations, and is a member of the Subcommittee on Article III, which has a primary focus on education. She also served on the Public Education committee and was vice chair of the Local & Consent Calendars Committee.

She is currently serving her second term as vice chair of the Mexican American Legislative Caucus, and second term as secretary of the House Border Caucus. González also serves as vice chair of the Board of Hispanic Caucus Chairs. Additionally, González was elected chair of the new Texas House LGBTQ Caucus, which was formed in January 2019. She was also elected to serve on the nonpartisan board of directors for the National Association of Latino Elected and Appointed Officials (NALEO) Education Fund.

=== Awards and recognition ===
In May 2013, González was named "Freshman of the Year" by Mexican American Legislative Caucus (MALC), the country's oldest and largest Latino legislative caucus.

González was also named a "Champion of Equality" and 2015's "Advocate of the Year" by Equality Texas.

In 2015, González became the youngest inductee to the El Paso Women's Hall of Fame.

González was named one of ten "Next Generation Latinas" by Latina Magazine for her leadership in education. She was also named one of 10 newly elected politicians to watch by NBC Latino.

== Election history ==
=== 2012 election ===
Democratic Party Primary Election, 2012: House District 75
Candidate		Votes	%	±
	Hector Enriquez	2,191	36.05%	
✓	Mary E. González	3,165	52.07%	
	"Tony" San Roman	722	11.87%	
Turnout		6,078		

2012 Texas elections: House District 75
Party	Candidate	Votes	%	±%
Democratic	Mary E. González	19,789	100.00	0.00
Majority		19,789	100.00	0.00
Turnout		19,789	100.00	
Democratic hold				

=== 2014 election ===
Democratic Party Primary Election, 2014: House District 75
Candidate		Votes	%	±
✓	Mary E. González	2,748	68.91%	
	Rey "Coach" Sepulveda	1,240	31.09%	
Turnout		3,988		

2014 Texas elections: House District 75
Party	Candidate	Votes	%	±%
Democratic	Mary E. González (I)	8,453	100.00	0.00
Majority		8,453	100.00	0.00
Turnout		8,453	100.00	
Democratic hold				

=== 2016 election ===
Democratic Party Primary Election, 2016: House District 75
Candidate		Votes	%	±
✓	Mary E. González	5,134	57.92%	
	Chente Quintanilla	3,730	42.08%	
Turnout		8,864		

2016 Texas elections: House District 75
Party	Candidate	Votes	%	±%
Democratic	Mary E. González (I)	32,576	100.00	0.00
Majority		32,576	100.00	0.00
Turnout		32,576	100.00	
Democratic hold				

== See also ==
- List of pansexual people
