= El Paso metropolitan area =

El Paso
- Metropolitan statistical area
- El Paso, Texas metropolitan statistical area
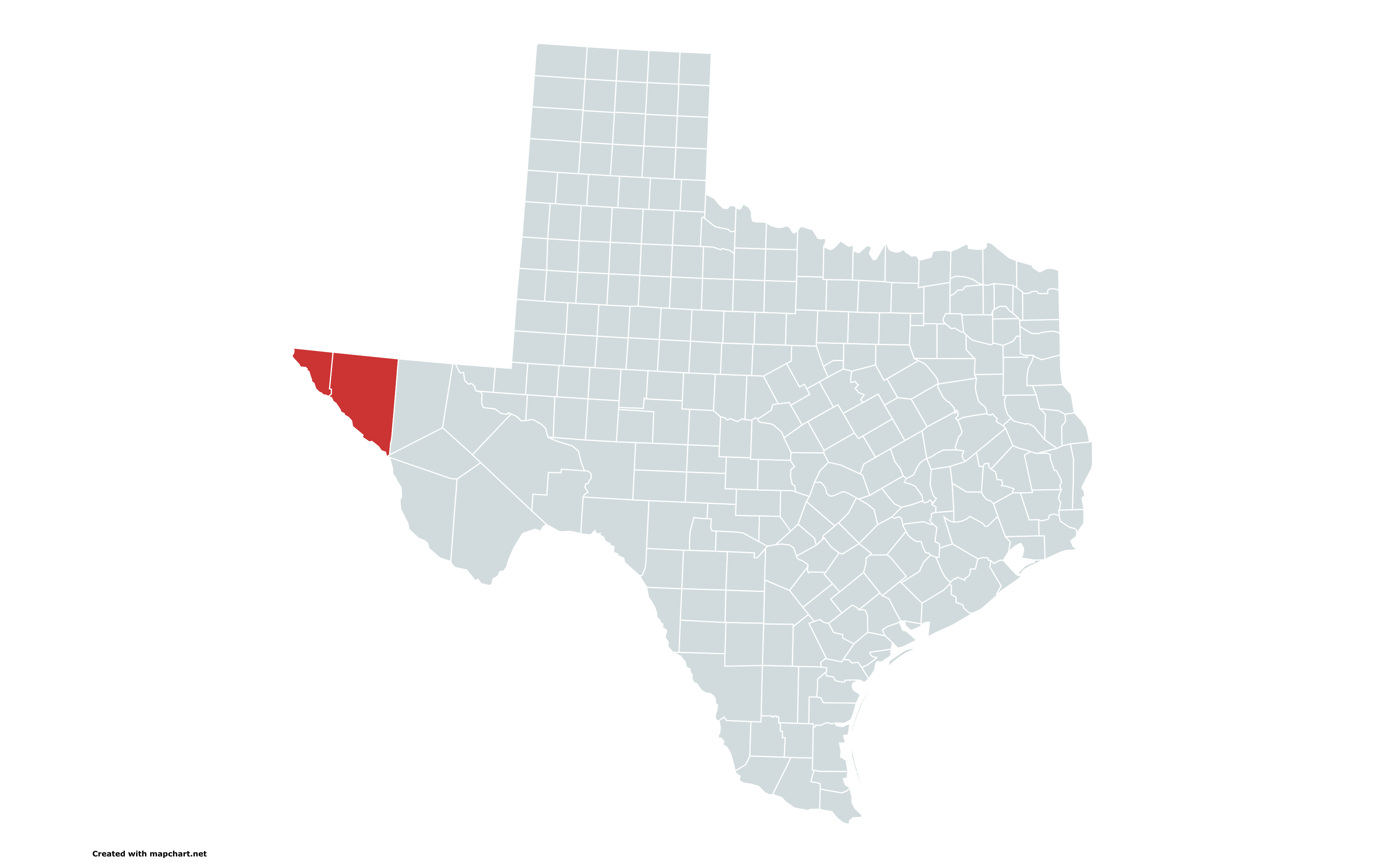
- El Paso metropolitan area in red
- State: Texas

Area
  - Metropolitan statistical area: 5,587 sq mi (14,470 km^{2})

Population (2020)
  - Urban: 854,584 (53rd)
  - MSA: 868,859 (67th)
  - CSA: 1,095,532 (56th)

GDP
  - MSA: $43.283 billion (2022)

The El Paso metropolitan area, officially the El Paso metropolitan statistical area, as defined by the United States Census Bureau, is an area consisting of two counties – El Paso and (since 2013) Hudspeth – in far West Texas, anchored by the city of El Paso. As of the 2020 United States census, the MSA had a population of 868,859. The El Paso MSA forms part of the larger El Paso–Las Cruces combined statistical area, with a total population of 1,108,758 as of the 2024 United States Census estimate.

== Counties ==
County	Seat	2025 estimate	2020 Census	Change	Area	Density
El Paso	El Paso	877,858	865,657	+1.41%	1,015 sq mi (2,630 km^{2})	865/sq mi (334/km^{2})
Hudspeth	Sierra Blanca	3,433	3,202	+7.21%	4,572 sq mi (11,840 km^{2})	1/sq mi (0/km^{2})
Total		881,291	868,859	+1.43%	5,587 sq mi (14,470 km^{2})	158/sq mi (61/km^{2})

== Communities ==
Historical population
Census	Pop.	Note	%±
1900	24,886		—
1910	52,599		111.4%
1920	101,877		93.7%
1930	131,597		29.2%
1940	131,067		−0.4%
1950	194,968		48.8%
1960	314,070		61.1%
1970	359,291		14.4%
1980	479,899		33.6%
1990	591,610		23.3%
2000	679,622		14.9%
2010	804,123		18.3%
2020	868,859		8.1%
U.S. Decennial Census

=== Incorporated places ===
- Town of Anthony
- Town of Clint
- Dell City
- City of El Paso
- City of Horizon City
- City of Socorro
- Village of Vinton

=== Census-designated places ===
- Agua Dulce
- Butterfield
- Canutillo
- Fabens
- Fort Bliss
- Fort Hancock
- Homestead Meadows North
- Homestead Meadows South
- Morning Glory
- Prado Verde
- San Elizario
- Sierra Blanca
- Sparks
- Tornillo
- Westway

=== Unincorporated places ===
- Allamoore
- Montana Vista
- Newman
- Salt Flat

== See also ==
- El Paso–Juárez, the binational metropolitan area of which this area forms a part
- Texas census statistical areas
