= Agua Dulce, Texas =

Agua Dulce, Texas may refer to:

- Agua Dulce, El Paso County, Texas
- Agua Dulce, Nueces County, Texas
