= Clint Junior High School (El Paso, Texas) =

Public school in Clint, Texas, United States

Location
- Clint, Texas United States; 31.5942°N 106.2377°W

Information
- Type: Public
- Established: 1921
- School district: Clint Independent School District
- Principal: David Morales
- Staff: 27.67 (FTE)
- Grades: 6-8
- Enrollment: 538 (2018–19)
- Student to teacher ratio: 19.44
- Athletics conference: UIL
- Mascot: Cub
- Website: cjhs.clintweb.net

Clint Junior High School is a public school in Clint, Texas (United States). It is part of the Clint Independent School District.

== History ==
Clint Junior High School is located in Clint, Texas. The history of this school starts in the year 1886 as an adobe house for the purposes of giving church and school to the surrounding developing area of Clint, Texas. In the year 1901, the school house caught fire and was burned but a new school house was placed on the same site. The school house was then sold and construction of a new school building was to be made. During the year of 1918 the construction of a new school building took place. By the year 1921 the construction of the new school building was finished and served as a school for the developing area and as population grew new schools were created making the school building today known as the Clint Junior High School. The school now serves grades 6 through 8. Clint Junior High School's mascot is the Cub.

== Extracurricular activities ==
- Student Council
- Newspaper
- Yearbook
- JROTC
- Speech and Debate
- crime stoppers
- Football
- Basketball
- Baseball
- Tennis
- Track & Field
