= Horizon Middle School =

Horizon Middle School may refer to:

- Horizon Middle School (Kissimmee, Florida)
- Horizon Middle School (Horizon City, Texas)
- Horizon Middle School (Spokane Valley, Washington), Central Valley School District
