= Horizon High School (Texas) =

Public school in Texas, United States

Coordinates: 31.6845°N 106.1689°W

- 14651 Horizon Blvd; Horizon City, Texas United States

Information
- Type: Public
- Established: 2002
- School district: Clint Independent School District
- Principal: Alejandro Navarro
- Staff: 108.27 (FTE)
- Grades: 9-12
- Enrollment: 1,579 (2023–2024)
- Student to teacher ratio: 14.58
- Colors: Black and Silver
- Athletics: 2-5A
- Athletics conference: UIL
- Mascot: Scorpion
- Website: hhs.clintweb.net

Horizon High School is a public school in Horizon City, Texas (United States). It is part of the Clint Independent School District.

== History ==
Horizon High School is Located in Horizon City, Texas. The school first opened its doors as Horizon Middle School, In its first year 2002-2003. The campus served as a middle school with grades 7, 8, and 9. In the years 2003-2004, grade 10 was added to the school, becoming Horizon Middle/High School. Horizon gradually started becoming a high school by the year 2005-2006, when Horizon Middle School moved to its own location and now is serving students in grades 9-12 having the Class of 2006 as its first senior graduating class. On June 1, 2007, Horizon High School had its second senior graduating class, the class of 2007. Horizon High School offers instructional strands in Telecommunications, Global Marketing, Banking, and Investments. It has an estimated student enrollment of 1,274. Horizon High School's mascot is the Mighty/Lady Scorpions.

== Significant Events ==
Horizon High School was run with controversy after students from school were found smuggling drugs between Ciudad Juarez, Chihuahua, Mexico, and Oklahoma City, Oklahoma. On August 9, 2007, U.S. Immigration and Customs Enforcement agents arrested 18-year-old at the time Horizon High School graduate Rene Humberto “Jetta” Perez for smuggling drugs between Mexico and Oklahoma City, OK. He was charged with conspiring to import about 1,000 kilos of marijuana and was sentenced to serve in prison. A federal magistrate set bond at $20,000. The Clint Independent School District was forced to install security camera systems to detect any drug-related activity around the school. On July 23, 2007, former student Ivan Lozoya informed law enforcement that Perez was responsible for the recruitment of several students to smuggle the drugs, which were then transported to drug lord known as “El Tio” in Oklahoma City. This investigation took months, when other students were captured for smuggling drugs into the U.S.; all accused Perez and Lozoya as recruiters of drug smuggling.

On August 30, 2012, Horizon City police went into Horizon High School and took photographs of students' tattoos, saying it was for gang activity information. One of the students' parents was upset due to the photographs being taken of her son's tattoos because she said it humiliated him and put her son's life in danger. Police Chief Michael McConnel stated he was not aware of the operation and that the photographs were destroyed, as he felt those police officers did not handle the situation appropriately.

A Horizon High School student at the time, 15 y/o Javier Rodriguez, was the youngest of the victims in the 2019 El Paso Walmart shooting. In 2022, Horizon High School and the Clint Independent School District honored him at Horizon's graduation ceremony at Don Haskins Center in 2022.

In 2024, Horizon High School Graphic Design teacher Mario Tafoya was killed in an automobile accident in Ciudad Juarez, Mexico. The school held a vigil in his honor, wearing Star Wars apparel, and released balloons into the sky.

Also in 2024, students at the school wrote a book called "Migrant 915: A View from The Border", highlighting the stories of Mexican immigrants in the El Paso area. The book was given overwhelming praise by Texas Representative Veronica Escobar and other members of Congress.

In Horizon High School's fight song, "Feel the Sting", there are unknown lyrics, but a shout of "Horizon! How? Mighty! Who? Scorpions! What? Feel The Sting!" is said twice.

== Extracurricular activities ==
Horizon High School provides academic and extracurricular activities to its students. The school participates in competitive performances in marching band, jazz band, dance, flags, Speech & Debate, One Act Play (Theatre), JROTC, and other extracurricular activities. Students have the opportunity to participate in learning experiences through the extracurricular activities offered at Horizon High School.

- Cosmetology
- Student Council
- Speech & Debate
- Marching Band
- Jazz Band
- Flag Team
- Spanish Club
- Dance
- Broadcasting/AV
- Graphic Design
- Yearbook
- One Act Play/Theatre
- JROTC
- National Honor Society
- Spanish Honor Society
- Criminal Justice Club

== Sports ==
Horizon High School is a member of the Texas University Interscholastic League, or UIL. Currently, Horizon is in District 2-5A. With very slow starts but becoming one of the strongest teams in Football, Basketball, and Baseball, the Scorpions are looking forward to becoming some of the cities' best athletes. Horizon High School does have one strong point in sports, its Cross-Country team. Both boys' and girls' team being ranked very high in the city's standings. With the Boys having their first 2-4A District Title in 2005, which led to a regional title as well. In 2024, Horizon High School started to decline in the Football program, only having 2 wins and 8 losses in 2024, and 1 win and 9 losses in 2025, seeking improvement in the future. In 2026, Horizon's baseball team competed in the 5A Division II state playoffs.

=== Boys ===
- Football
- Basketball
- Baseball
- Tennis
- Track & Field
- Cross Country
- Golf
- Soccer
- Wrestling

=== Girls ===
- Cheerleading
- Volleyball
- Basketball
- Softball
- Tennis
- Flag Football
- Track & Field
- Cross Country
- Wrestling
