= El Paso County, Texas =

County in Texas, United States

- County
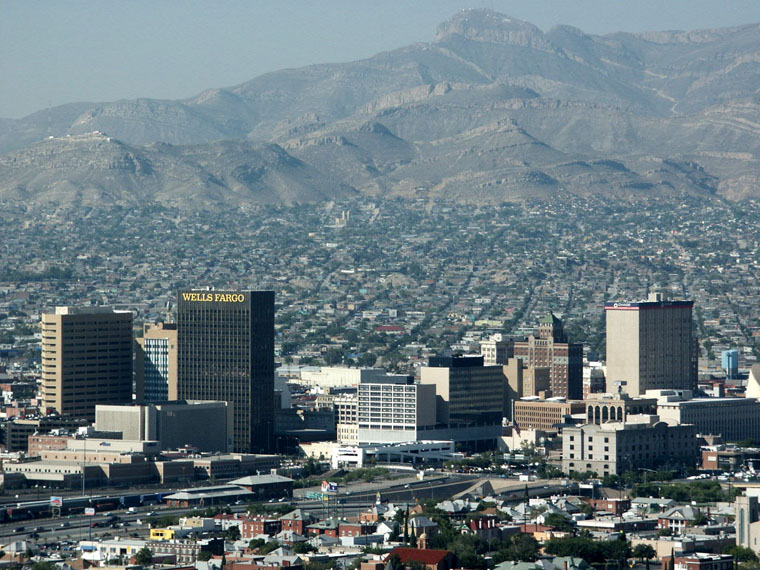
- Skyline of El Paso, the largest city within the county

- Flag Seal

- Location within the U.S. state of Texas
- Coordinates: 31°46′N 106°14′W
- Country: United States
- State: Texas
- Founded: 1871
- Seat: El Paso
- Largest city: El Paso

Area
  - Total: 1,015 sq mi (2,630 km^{2})
  - Land: 1,013 sq mi (2,620 km^{2})
  - Water: 2.3 sq mi (6.0 km^{2}) 0.2%

Population (2020)
  - Total: 865,657
  - Estimate (2025): 877,858 ▲
  - Density: 854.5/sq mi (329.9/km^{2})
- Time zone: UTC−7 (Mountain)
  - Summer (DST): UTC−6 (MDT)
- Congressional districts: 16th, 23rd
- Website: www.epcounty.com

El Paso County is the westernmost county in the U.S. state of Texas. As of the 2020 census, its population was 865,657, making it the tenth-most populous county in Texas. Its county seat is the city of El Paso, the sixth-most populous city in Texas and the 22nd-most populous city in the United States. The county was created in 1850 and later organized in 1871.

El Paso is from the name El Paso del Norte, which is Spanish for "the Route of the North". It is named for the pass the Rio Grande creates through the mountains on either side of the river. The county is northeast of the Mexico–United States border.

El Paso County is included in the El Paso metropolitan area. Along with Hudspeth County, it is one of two counties of Texas entirely in the Mountain Time Zone (all other Texas counties except for northwestern Culberson County use Central Time). El Paso County is one of nine counties that comprise the Trans-Pecos region of West Texas.

== Geography ==
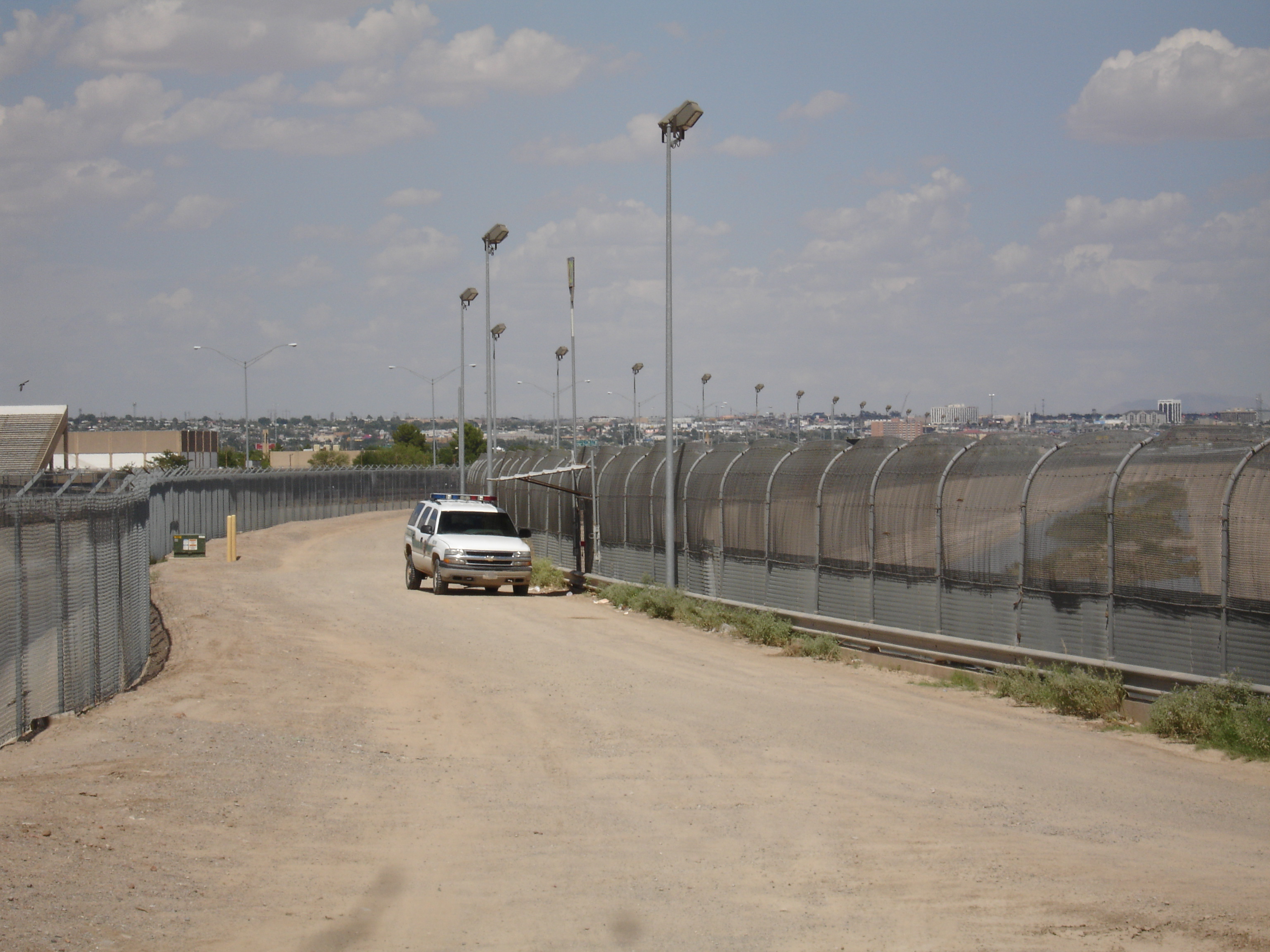
El Paso is on the US-Mexico border

According to the U.S. Census Bureau, the county has a total area of 1,015 square miles (2,630 km^{2}), of which 2.3 square miles (6.0 km^{2}) (0.2%) are covered by water.

=== Adjacent counties and municipalities ===
- Doña Ana County, New Mexico – northwest
- Otero County, New Mexico – northeast
- Hudspeth County, Texas – east
- Guadalupe, Chihuahua, Mexico – south
- Juárez, Chihuahua, Mexico – south
- Práxedis G. Guerrero, Chihuahua, Mexico – southeast

=== National protected area ===
- Chamizal National Memorial
- El Camino Real de Tierra Adentro National Historic Trail (part)

=== Major highways ===
- I-10
- I-110
- US 54
  - Bus. US 54
- US 62
- US 85
- US 180
- SH 20
- SH 178
- Loop 375
- Loop 478
- Spur 6
- Spur 16
- Spur 37
- Spur 320
- Spur 601
- Spur 1966

== Demographics ==
Historical population
Census	Pop.	Note	%±
1860	4,051		—
1870	3,671		−9.4%
1880	3,845		4.7%
1890	15,678		307.8%
1900	24,886		58.7%
1910	52,599		111.4%
1920	101,877		93.7%
1930	131,597		29.2%
1940	131,067		−0.4%
1950	194,968		48.8%
1960	314,070		61.1%
1970	359,291		14.4%
1980	479,899		33.6%
1990	591,610		23.3%
2000	679,622		14.9%
2010	800,647		17.8%
2020	865,657		8.1%
2025 (est.)	877,858	▲	1.4%
U.S. Decennial Census; 1850–2010 2010 2020

=== Racial and ethnic composition ===
El Paso County, Texas – Racial and ethnic composition Note: the US Census treats Hispanic/Latino as an ethnic category. This table excludes Latinos from the racial categories and assigns them to a separate category. Hispanics/Latinos may be of any race.
Race / Ethnicity (NH = Non-Hispanic)	Pop 1980	Pop 1990	Pop 2000	Pop 2010	Pop 2020	% 1980	% 1990	% 2000	% 2010	% 2020
White alone (NH)	157,842	151,313	115,535	105,246	98,219	32.89%	25.58%	17.00%	13.15%	11.35%
Black or African American alone (NH)	17,590	20,525	18,671	20,649	24,415	3.67%	3.47%	2.75%	2.58%	2.82%
Native American or Alaska Native alone (NH)	1,515	1,634	2,057	2,269	2,365	0.32%	0.28%	0.30%	0.28%	0.27%
Asian alone (NH)	4,053	5,820	6,148	7,551	10,692	0.84%	0.98%	0.90%	0.94%	1.24%
Native Hawaiian or Pacific Islander alone (NH)	x	x	440	805	1,527	x	x	0.06%	0.10%	0.18%
Other race alone (NH)	1,898	699	497	602	2,422	0.40%	0.12%	0.07%	0.08%	0.28%
Mixed race or Multiracial (NH)	x	x	4,620	5,391	10,666	x	x	0.68%	0.67%	1.23%
Hispanic or Latino (any race)	297,001	411,619	531,654	658,134	715,351	61.89%	69.58%	78.23%	82.20%	82.64%
Total	479,899	591,610	679,622	800,647	865,657	100.00%	100.00%	100.00%	100.00%	100.00%

=== American Community Survey 2025 data ===
The United States Census Bureau estimated that in 2025, El Paso County’s population was 877.858. It was also estimated that the county's population was 10,70% Non-Hispanic White, 82,80% Hispanic or Latino, 3,39% Non-Hispanic Black, 1,41% Asian, 0,31% Native American, 0,17% Pacific Islander, and 1,23% Multiracial.

Total	Population	Percentage
Non-Hispanic White	93.935	10,70%
Hispanic or Latino	726.824	82,80%
Non-Hispanic Black	29.738	3,39%
Asian	12.340	1,41%
Native American	2.694	0,31%
Pacific Islander	1.520	0,17%
Non-Hispanic Multiracial	10.807	1,23%

=== 2020 census ===
As of the 2020 census, the county had a population of 865,657. The median age was 34.2 years. 25.5% of residents were under the age of 18 and 13.6% of residents were 65 years of age or older. For every 100 females there were 94.7 males, and for every 100 females age 18 and over there were 91.9 males.

The racial makeup of the county was 36.2% White, 3.4% Black or African American, 1.2% American Indian and Alaska Native, 1.4% Asian, 0.2% Native Hawaiian and Pacific Islander, 21.8% from some other race, and 35.8% from two or more races. Hispanic or Latino residents of any race comprised 82.6% of the population.

96.0% of residents lived in urban areas, while 4.0% lived in rural areas.

There were 296,400 households in the county, of which 38.6% had children under the age of 18 living in them. Of all households, 46.7% were married-couple households, 17.6% were households with a male householder and no spouse or partner present, and 30.3% were households with a female householder and no spouse or partner present. About 22.8% of all households were made up of individuals and 8.8% had someone living alone who was 65 years of age or older.

There were 317,894 housing units, of which 6.8% were vacant. Among occupied housing units, 61.9% were owner-occupied and 38.1% were renter-occupied. The homeowner vacancy rate was 1.3% and the rental vacancy rate was 7.7%.

=== 2010 census ===
As of the 2010 United States census, there were 800,647 people living in the county. 82.1% were White of largely Hispanic descent, 10.5% of other races, 3.1% African American or Black, 2.5% of two or more races, 1.0% Asian, 0.8% Native American and 0.1% Pacific Islander. 82.2% were Latino (of any race).

=== 2000 census ===
As of the census of 2000, there were 679,622 people, 210,022 households, and 166,127 families living in the county. The population density was 671 people per square mile (259 people/km^{2}). There were 224,447 housing units at an average density of 222 per square mile (86/km^{2}). The city was 78.23% Latino of any race. The racial makeup of the county was 73.95% White, 17.91% from other races, 3.06% African American or Black, 0.82% Native American, 0.98% Asian, 0.10% Pacific Islander, and 3.19% from two or more races.

There were 210,022 households, out of which 44.90% had children under the age of 18 living with them, 56.70% were married couples living together, 18.00% had a female householder with no husband present, and 20.90% were non-families. 17.80% of all households were made up of individuals, and 6.70% had someone living alone who was 65 years of age or older. The average household size was 3.18 and the average family size was 3.63.

In the county, 32.00% were under the age of 18, 10.60% from 18 to 24, 29.30% from 25 to 44, 18.40% from 45 to 64, and 9.70% were 65 years of age or older. The median age was 30 years. For every 100 females there were 93.20 males. For every 100 females age 18 and over, there were 88.70 males.

The median income for a household in the county was $31,051, and the median income for a family was $33,410. Males had a median income of $26,882 versus $20,722 for females. The per capita income for the county was $13,421. About 20.50% of families and 23.80% of the population were below the poverty line, including 31.50% of those under age 18 and 18.50% of those age 65 or over.

== Government and politics ==
Most of El Paso County is included in the 16th Congressional District in the U.S. House, represented by Democrat Veronica Escobar. A small eastern portion of the county is in the 23rd Congressional District, which was represented by Republican Tony Gonzales prior to his resignation in 2026. El Paso County is historically Democratic and the 2008 presidential election was no exception. Democrat Barack Obama won 66% of the vote with 121,589 votes even though he lost the entire state of Texas by about 946,000 votes. Republican John McCain won 33% of the vote in El Paso County with 61,598 votes. Other candidates won 1% of the vote. In 2004, Democrat John F. Kerry won El Paso County but by a smaller margin than Barack Obama. John Kerry won 56% of the vote, while Republican and former Governor of Texas George W. Bush won 43% of the vote with 73,261 votes.

In 2024 Donald Trump got the biggest vote share for a Republican in the county since 2004 with 41.8%, constituting a 20-point shift margin-wise to the right from 2020. This was largely due to increased support for Trump among Latinos, whom he won in Texas with 55%.

United States presidential election results for El Paso County, Texas
Year	Republican		Democratic		Third party(ies)	
Year	No.	%	No.	%	No.	%
1912	291	7.21%	2,914	72.18%	832	20.61%
1916	1,770	32.08%	3,603	65.30%	145	2.63%
1920	4,070	49.12%	4,143	50.00%	73	0.88%
1924	4,078	35.99%	6,220	54.90%	1,032	9.11%
1928	6,050	49.74%	6,114	50.26%	0	0.00%
1932	2,841	19.74%	11,336	78.77%	215	1.49%
1936	1,773	12.84%	11,920	86.32%	116	0.84%
1940	3,764	23.28%	12,374	76.55%	27	0.17%
1944	2,072	13.18%	11,426	72.69%	2,220	14.12%
1948	5,544	25.85%	15,341	71.53%	563	2.62%
1952	20,005	57.74%	14,595	42.12%	47	0.14%
1956	18,532	54.70%	15,157	44.73%	193	0.57%
1960	21,551	45.20%	26,027	54.59%	99	0.21%
1964	20,687	36.99%	35,050	62.67%	190	0.34%
1968	30,347	44.55%	32,658	47.94%	5,111	7.50%
1972	49,981	60.15%	32,435	39.04%	674	0.81%
1976	42,697	47.72%	45,477	50.83%	1,291	1.44%
1980	53,276	53.53%	40,082	40.27%	6,168	6.20%
1984	66,114	55.83%	51,917	43.84%	399	0.34%
1988	55,573	46.79%	62,622	52.72%	586	0.49%
1992	47,224	34.94%	67,715	50.10%	20,224	14.96%
1996	43,255	32.11%	83,964	62.33%	7,491	5.56%
2000	57,574	39.69%	83,848	57.81%	3,620	2.50%
2004	73,261	43.20%	95,142	56.11%	1,170	0.69%
2008	61,783	33.28%	122,021	65.73%	1,826	0.98%
2012	57,150	33.09%	112,952	65.40%	2,601	1.51%
2016	55,512	25.71%	147,843	68.47%	12,567	5.82%
2020	84,331	31.56%	178,126	66.66%	4,758	1.78%
2024	105,124	41.79%	143,156	56.91%	3,289	1.31%

United States Senate election results for El Paso County, Texas1
Year	Republican		Democratic		Third party(ies)	
Year	No.	%	No.	%	No.	%
2024	92,997	37.96%	141,826	57.89%	10,164	4.15%

United States Senate election results for El Paso County, Texas2
Year	Republican		Democratic		Third party(ies)	
Year	No.	%	No.	%	No.	%
2020	80,021	30.87%	164,931	63.62%	14,298	5.52%
2026	54,576	24.97%	159,272	72.88%	4,689	2.15%

Texas Gubernatorial election results for El Paso County
Year	Republican		Democratic		Third party(ies)	
Year	No.	%	No.	%	No.	%
2022	57,573	34.80%	105,156	63.56%	2,717	1.64%
2026	61,759	27.98%	154,658	70.08%	4,277	1.94%

The El Paso County Sheriff's Office is headquartered in an unincorporated area in El Paso County. At one point it was headquartered within the City of El Paso. The Leo Samaniego Law Enforcement Complex is adjacent to the sheriff's office headquarters.

Like all Texas counties, El Paso County is governed by a Commissioners Court, which consists of a County Judge, who is elected county-wide, and four County Commissioners, who represent individual precincts. While the County Judge possesses some traditional powers of a judge, the County Judge functions primarily as the chief executive of the county. The County Judge presides over Commissioners Court meetings, casts one vote on Commissioners Court (as do County Commissioners), and lacks veto authority.

The El Paso County Judge is Ricardo Samaniego, and the county commissioners are Carlos Leon (Precinct 1), David Stout (Precinct 2), Iliana Holguin (Precinct 3), and Carl L. Robinson(Precinct 4). The commissioners and the county judge are all Democrats.

Vogt was appointed County Judge in October 2017 by the County Commissioners, following County Judge Veronica Escobar's resignation to run for Congress. He was previously Escobar's chief of staff. He will serve the remainder of her term, through the end of 2018. Leon and Perez were first elected to their positions in 2012, were re-elected in 2016, and have been in office since 2013. Haggerty and Stout were first elected to their positions in 2014, and have been in office since 2015.

The first woman to hold elected office in El Paso County was a teacher, Myra Carroll Winkler, who was elected as superintendent of El Paso County schools in 1912.

=== United States Congress ===
Representatives	Name	Party	First Elected	Area(s) of El Paso County Represented
District 16	Veronica Escobar	Democratic	2018	City of El Paso, Fort Bliss, Horizon City, Sparks
District 23	Vacant	TBD	N/A	Agua Dulce, Biggs Field, Butterfield, Clint, Fabens, Homestead Meadows North, Homestead Meadows South, Socorro, San Elizario, Tornillo

=== Texas Legislature ===
==== Texas Senate ====
District	Name	Party	First Elected	Area(s) of El Paso County Represented
29	Cesar Blanco	Democratic	2020	Entirety of El Paso County

==== Texas House of Representatives ====
District	Name	Party	First Elected	Area(s) of El Paso County Represented
74	Eddie Morales	Democratic	2020	Northeast El Paso County
75	Mary González	Democratic	2012	Parts of the city of El Paso and Socorro, Clint, Fabens, Horizon City, San Elizario and Tornillo.
77	Evelina Ortega	Democratic	2016	Parts of the city of El Paso
78	Joe Moody	Democratic	2008	Northern El Paso County, including parts of the city of El Paso and Anthony, Canutillo, Prado Verde, Vinton and Westway.
130	Claudia Ordaz	Democratic	2022	Parts of the city of El Paso and Fort Bliss

=== County government ===
==== El Paso County elected officials ====
Position	Name	Party
County Judge	Ricardo Samaniego	Democratic
Commissioner, Precinct 1	Jackie Arroyo Butler	Democratic
Commissioner, Precinct 2	David Stout	Democratic
Commissioner, Precinct 3	Iliana Houglin	Democratic
Commissioner, Precinct 4	Sergio Cornando	Democratic
District Attorney	James Montoya	Democratic
District Clerk	Norma Favela Barceleau	Democratic
County Attorney	Christina Sanchez	Democratic
County Clerk	Delia Briones	Democratic
Sheriff	Oscar Ugarte	Democratic
Tax Assessor-Collector	Ruben P. Gonzalez	Democratic
Constable, Precinct 1	Frank Almada	Democratic
Constable, Precinct 2	Danny T. Zamora	Democratic
Constable, Precinct 3	Hector J. Bernal	Democratic
Constable, Precinct 4	Luis Aguilar	Democratic
Constable, Precinct 5	Manny Lopez	Democratic
Constable, Precinct 6, Place 1 & 2	Javier Garcia	Democratic
Constable, Precinct 7	Humberto "Beto" Enriquez	Democratic

== Communities ==
=== Cities ===
- El Paso
- Horizon City
- San Elizario
- Socorro

=== Towns ===
- Anthony
- Clint

=== Village ===
- Vinton

=== Census-designated places ===
- Agua Dulce
- Butterfield
- Canutillo
- Fabens
- Homestead Meadows North
- Homestead Meadows South
- Morning Glory
- Prado Verde
- Sparks
- Tornillo
- Westway

=== Military base ===
- Fort Bliss (also CDP)

=== Unincorporated communities ===
- Montana Vista
- Newman

== Economy ==
As of 2021, El Paso County had a total GDP of around $30 billion and $35,000 per capita.

== Education ==
School districts include:

- Anthony Independent School District
- Canutillo Independent School District
- Clint Independent School District
- El Paso Independent School District
- Fabens Independent School District
- San Elizario Independent School District
- Socorro Independent School District
- Tornillo Independent School District
- Ysleta Independent School District

All of the county is in the service area of El Paso Community College.

== Infrastructure ==
The El Paso County Animal Welfare Department, which operates the county animal shelter, is headquartered in El Paso. The City of El Paso maintains the City of El Paso Animal Services shelter, also in El Paso, across from Fort Bliss National Cemetery.

== National Historic Landmark ==
The Rio Vista Bracero Reception Center was designated It was named a National Historic Landmark by the U.S. Secretary of the Interior, Deb Haaland, on December 11, 2023. The Rio Vista Farm buildings and surrounding fields in Socorro, TX are included in the Historic Landmark district.

== See also ==
- El Paso Holocaust Museum and Study Center
- List of museums in West Texas
- National Border Patrol Museum
- National Register of Historic Places listings in El Paso County, Texas
- Recorded Texas Historic Landmarks in El Paso County
