= Tornillo Independent School District =

School district in Texas, United States

Tornillo Independent School District is a public school district based in the community of Tornillo, Texas (USA). The district is in El Paso County, and almost all of Tornillo is within this district.

In 2009, the school district was rated "recognized" by the Texas Education Agency.

== Schools ==
- Tornillo High School (Grades 9-12)
- Tornillo Junior High School (Grades 6-8)
- Tornillo Intermediate School (Grades 3-5)
- Tornillo Elementary School (Grades PK-2)
