= Fabens Independent School District =

School district in Texas, United States

Fabens Independent School District is a public school district based in the community of Fabens, Texas (USA). The district is in El Paso County and its Superintendent is Edefonso Garcia.

In addition to Fabens, it includes a small section of Tornillo.

In 2009, the school district was rated "academically acceptable" by the Texas Education Agency.

The Texas Education Agency's college readiness performance data shows that only 3.5% (5 out of 144 students) of the graduates of the class of 2010 of the Fabens school district met TEA's average performance criterion on SAT or ACT college admission tests.

== Schools ==
- Cotton Valley Early College High School (Grades 9-12)
- Fabens High (Grades 9-12)
- Fabens Middle (Grades 6-8)
- O'Donnell Elementary (Grades 4-5)
- Fabens Elementary (Grades PK-3)
