= Socorro, Texas =

- City
- City of Socorro
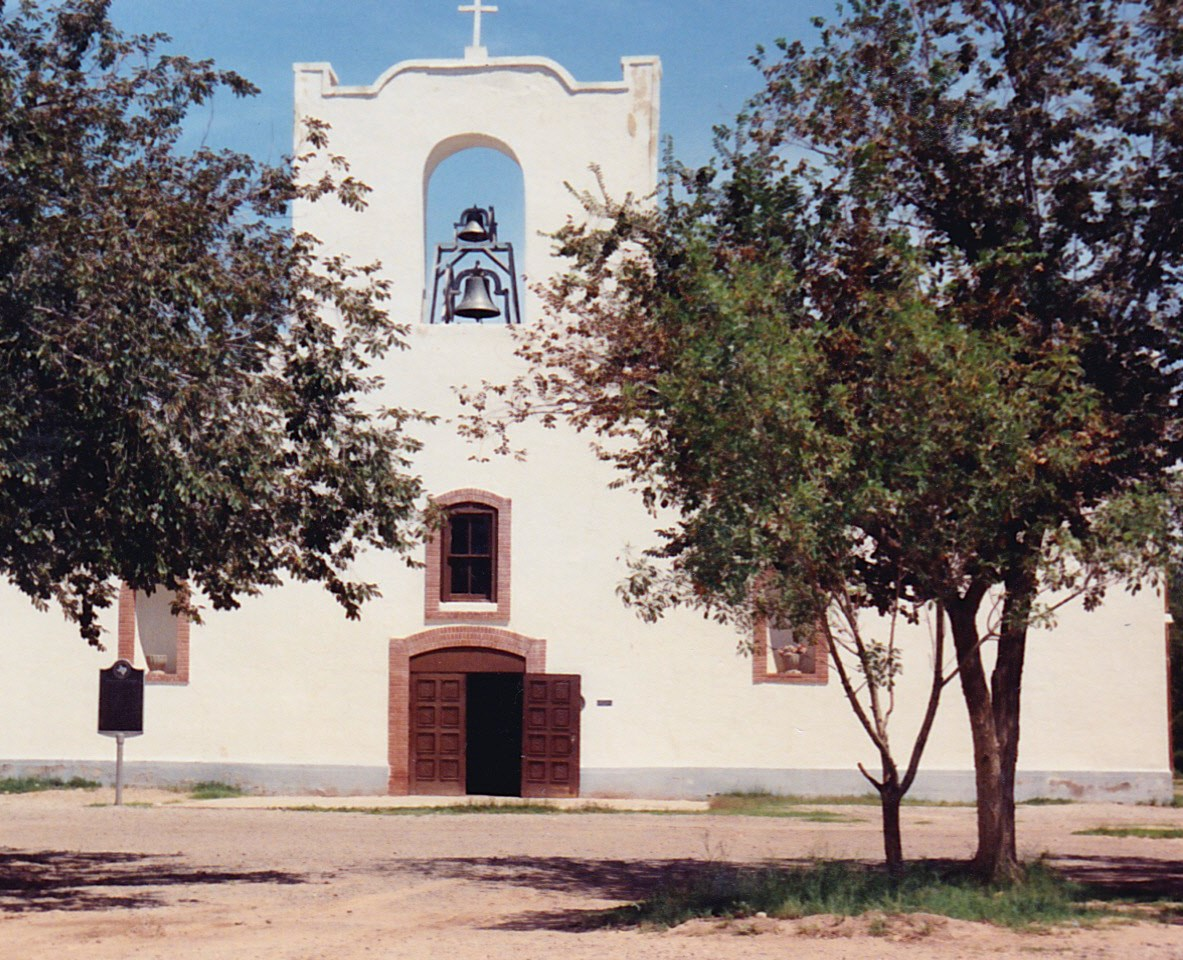

- Seal
- Motto: City with a Mission
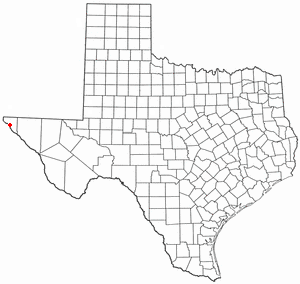
- Location of Socorro, Texas

- Coordinates: 31°37′30″N 106°14′40″W
- Country: United States
- State: Texas
- County: El Paso
- Founded: 1680
- Incorporated: 1985 (first incorporated 1871)

Government
  - Type: Council-Manager
  - Mayor: David Carlos
  - City Manager: Gabriel Chester

Area
  - Total: 21.97 sq mi (56.90 km^{2})
  - Land: 21.95 sq mi (56.84 km^{2})
  - Water: 0.023 sq mi (0.06 km^{2})
- Elevation: 3,652 ft (1,113 m)

Population (2020)
  - Total: 34,306
  - Density: 1,566.0/sq mi (604.65/km^{2})
- Time zone: UTC-7 (Mountain (MST))
  - Summer (DST): UTC-6 (MDT)
- ZIP codes: 79927-79929
- Area code: 915
- FIPS code: 48-68636
- GNIS feature ID: 2411920
- Website: costx.us

Socorro is a city in El Paso County, Texas, United States. It is located on the north bank of the Rio Grande southeast of El Paso, and on the border of Mexico. El Paso adjoins it on the west and the smaller city of San Elizario on the southeast; small unincorporated areas of El Paso County separate it from the nearby municipalities of Horizon City to the north and Clint to the east.

As of the 2020 census, the city population was 34,306. By the 2010 census, the number had grown to 32,013. As of July 1, 2019, the population estimate for the city from the U.S. Census was 34,370. It is part of the El Paso Metropolitan Statistical Area. The city is El Paso County's second-largest municipality, after El Paso. It has a council-manager type of government with five city council members.

== Geography ==
According to the United States Census Bureau, the city has a total area of 22.06 square miles (57.13 km^{2}), of 0.023 square miles (0.06 km^{2}), or 0.10%, is covered by water.

== History ==
Socorro was established in 1680 by local Manso and Piro Indians fleeing the Pueblo Revolt in northern New Mexico. It took its name from Socorro, the town in central New Mexico from which the Piros had originated, which had been given the name Socorro (Spanish for "aid" or "succor") by the Spaniards due to the helpful attitude of the Piro toward the Spaniards at the time of first contact. The probable date of a Mass celebrated in the mission church of Nuestra Señora de la Limpia Concepción del Socorro, October 13, 1680, is regarded as the founding date of the city in Texas, called Socorro, established by the Spaniards and the Piro they brought south with them from New Mexico during the Pueblo Revolt. Socorro was first incorporated in 1871, and was reincorporated in 1985 in response to an annexation attempt from neighboring El Paso.

== Demographics ==
Historical population
Census	Pop.	Note	%±
1890	801		—
1910	1,147		—
1990	22,995		—
2000	27,152		18.1%
2010	32,013		17.9%
2020	34,306		7.2%
U.S. Decennial Census

=== 2020 census ===
Socorro racial composition (NH = Non-Hispanic) (Note: Note: the US Census treats Hispanic/Latino as an ethnic category. This table excludes Latinos from the racial categories and assigns them to a separate category. Hispanics/Latinos can be of any race.)
Race	Number	Percentage
White (NH)	741	2.16%
Black or African American (NH)	77	0.22%
Native American or Alaska Native (NH)	221	0.64%
Asian (NH)	37	0.11%
Pacific Islander (NH)	7	0.02%
Some Other Race (NH)	49	0.14%
Mixed/Multi-Racial (NH)	76	0.22%
Hispanic or Latino	33,098	96.48%
Total	34,306	

Racial composition as of the 2020 census
Race	Number	Percent
White	10,070	29.4%
Black or African American	154	0.4%
American Indian and Alaska Native	1,058	3.1%
Asian	62	0.2%
Native Hawaiian and Other Pacific Islander	9	0.0%
Some other race	10,168	29.6%
Two or more races	12,785	37.3%
Hispanic or Latino (of any race)	33,098	96.5%

As of the 2020 census, Socorro had a population of 34,306 and 8,442 families residing in the city. Socorro's population makes it the 93rd-largest city in Texas, or bigger than 94% of all Texas cities, and the city grew 7.2% from 32,013 people in 2010 to 34,306 people in 2020.

The median age was 34.6 years. 27.1% of residents were under the age of 18 and 13.9% of residents were 65 years of age or older. For every 100 females there were 92.6 males, and for every 100 females age 18 and over there were 90.3 males age 18 and over.

There were 10,408 households in Socorro, of which 44.6% had children under the age of 18 living in them. Of all households, 52.1% were married-couple households, 15.1% were households with a male householder and no spouse or partner present, and 27.6% were households with a female householder and no spouse or partner present. About 16.0% of all households were made up of individuals and 7.0% had someone living alone who was 65 years of age or older.

There were 11,148 housing units, of which 6.6% were vacant. The homeowner vacancy rate was 1.2% and the rental vacancy rate was 7.3%.

98.3% of residents lived in urban areas, while 1.7% lived in rural areas.

=== 2010 census ===
As of the census of 2010, 8,792 households and 7,703 families were residing in the city. The population density was 1,453.2 people/sq mi (560.9/km^{2}). The 9,313 housing units had an average density of 422.7 per square mile (163.2/km^{2}). The racial makeup of the city was 94.3% White, 0.2% African American, 1.6% Native American, 0.1% Asian, 2.9% from some other race, and 0.8% from two or more races. Hispanics or Latinos of any race were 96.7% of the population.

Of the 8,792 households, 56.5% had children under 18 living with them, 62.4% were married couples living together, 19.1% had a female householder with no husband present, and 12.4% were not families. About 10.9% of all households were made up of individuals, and 4.5% were someone living alone who was 65 or older. The average household size was 3.64, and the average family size was 3.93.

In the city, age distribution was 32.5% under 18, 11.4% from 18 to 24, 25.3% from 25 to 44, 21.9% from 45 to 64, and 8.7% who were 65 or older. The median age was 29.5 years. For every 100 females, there were 93.1 males. For every 100 females age 18 and over, there were 90.7 males.

For the period 2009–2011, the estimated median annual income for a household in the city was $30,014, and for a family was $30,998. Males had a median income of $26,239 versus $20,189 for females. The per capita income for the city was $11,455. About 29.3% of families and 32.0% of the population were below the poverty line, including 44.4% of those under age 18 and 29.2% of those age 65 or over.

== Economy ==
Socorro is a city of sales and office employees, construction workers, builders, and service providers.

== Points of interest ==
The Rio Vista Bracero Reception Center was designated a National Historic Landmark on December 11, 2023. First created as an orphanage and poor farm in 1915, it became a processing center for the Bracero Program in 1950 which brought Mexicans to the United States as guest agricultural workers.

Bulldog Championship Park includes a splash park, an amphitheater, walking trails, and a pond.

Socorro Mission is a Franciscan mission built around 1840 to serve the Native American population in the area. The white adobe mission is a registered Texas historic landmark and one of three missions on the historic Mission Trail. In the mission stands a $300,000 replica of the Pieta. It is one of only 112 authorized replicas of the Pieta, finished by artist Michelangelo in 1499, which can be found in St. Peter's Basilica, Vatican City.

Socorro Entertainment Center is a Native American entertainment and concert venue. Past and upcoming concerts include national acts such as Counting Crows, Gipsy Kings, KC and the Sunshine Band, BB King, Everclear, Soul Asylum, and Toad the Wet Sprocket.

- Socorro Entertainment Center
- Fiesta de San Miguel—Socorro Mission La Purisima—annual bazaar held in September with live music, dancing, food, drinks, games and rides

=== Parks ===
Bulldog Championship Park, the newest park in El Paso County, contains about 6.25 acres, and is located in the City of Socorro. Park amenities include an amphitheater, pavilions, a splash playground, playgrounds, detention pond, walking trails, and over 90 parking spaces.

== Politics ==
The city of Socorro operates under a council–manager government. Citizens are represented on the city council by six elected members—the mayor and five city council members. The city council is responsible for setting policy and enacting ordinances for the benefit of the residents and businesses in Socorro. The city manager is responsible for the strategic management of the operating and administrative services and for executing the policies and laws of the council. The city manager oversees the provision of services, including police, public works, human resources, accounting/purchasing, and planning and zoning.

Council members are elected to a four-year, staggered term.

== Sports ==
Socorro High School won the 5A Texas state baseball championship in 2009.

== Education ==
Most of Socorro lies within the Socorro Independent School District, with northeast Socorro, including recently annexed areas north of Interstate 10 and between Interstate 10 and Clint, lying within the Clint Independent School District. The following schools, all in the Socorro Independent School District, serve the city of Socorro:

Zoned elementary schools:

- Escontrias Elementary School
- H.D. Hilley Elementary School
- Hueco Elementary School
- Robert R. Rojas Elementary School
- Ernesto Serna Elementary-Intermediate School
- Campestre Elementary School

The zoned middle schools are: Socorro Middle School, Salvador H. Sanchez Middle School, and Ernesto Serna Elementary-Intermediate School.

The sole zoned high school is Socorro High School.

Other Socorro ISD schools include: Escontrias Early Childhood and KEYS Elementary Academy.

The part of Socorro within the Clint Independent School District is zoned to Clint High School, Clint Junior High School, and Surratt Elementary School, all in Clint.

== See also ==
- Socorro Mission
