= Montana Vista, Texas =

Unincorporated community in Texas, US

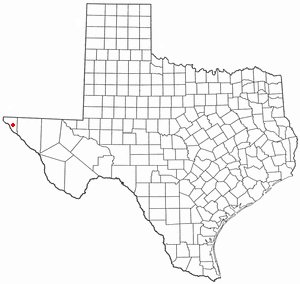
Location of Horizon City, Texas

Montana Vista is an unincorporated community in El Paso County, Texas, United States. This Colonia lies northeast of Horizon City and far east of El Paso.

Montana Vista is located at 32°41′55″N 107°12′47″W (31.682315, -106.196127). The community is part of the El Paso Metropolitan Statistical Area.
