= Mountain View High School (Texas) =

Public school in Texas, United States

Location
- 14964 Greg Drive; El Paso, Texas; United States; 31.7975°N 106.1586°W

Information
- Type: Public
- Established: 1989
- School district: Clint Independent School District
- Principal: Roberto C Trejo
- Faculty: 60.33 (FTE)
- Grades: 9-12
- Student to teacher ratio: 13.08
- Colors: Blue and silver
- Athletics: 2-4A
- Athletics conference: UIL
- Mascot: Lobo
- Website: mvhs.clintweb.net

Mountain View High School is a public school in El Paso, Texas, (United States). It is part of the Clint Independent School District.

== History ==
Mountain View Jr./Sr. High School opened its doors to students on September 4, 1989. It serviced students in grades 7-10, and enrollment was 457. The library served as both a cafeteria and a gymnasium until these facilities opened in January 1990. During the school years of 1990-1991 the school serviced students in grades 7-10, and enrollment was 638. Wings on the east side of the campus were completed, and the training room was built. The name of the school newspaper was changed to Lobo Press. On the school years 1991-1992, Seventy-four seniors became Mountain View 's first graduating class. Students experienced their first Homecoming, High-Q joined, and grass was planted. Enrollment was 1041 and consisted of students in grades 6-12. In the school years 1992-1993 Mountain View High School with the opening of East Montana Middle School allowed the school to become a full high school by serving grades 9-12 and an enrollment of 580. Mountain View High School has ever since grown larger and continues to improve its educational achievements .

== Extracurricular activities ==
- Art Club
- Book Club
- Business Professionals of America
- Flags
- JROTC
- Law Enforcement
- Lobo Fanatics
- Marching Band
- National Honor Society
- Newspaper
- Robotics Club
- Sociedad Honoraria Hispánica
- Student Council
- UIL Academics
- Yearbook
- Howlin' Wolf Theatre Company Drama Club
- HPA (Health Professions Academy)

== Sports ==
=== Boys ===
- Football
- Basketball
- Baseball
- Tennis
- Track & Field
- Cross Country
- Golf

=== Girls ===
- Volleyball
- Basketball
- Softball
- Tennis
- Track & Field
- Cross Country
- Golf
- Cheer
