= San Elizario Independent School District =

School district in Texas, United States

San Elizario Independent School District is a public school district based in the community of San Elizario, Texas (USA). The district is in El Paso County and its superintendent is Dr. Meza-Chavez.

In 2009, the school district was rated "academically acceptable" by the Texas Education Agency.

In 2015, San Elizario High School won the UIL Soccer and three consecutive Cross Country State Championship title

== Schools ==
- San Elizario High (Grades 9-12) Built in 1995
- Ann M. Garcia-Enriquez Middle (Grades 7-8) Formally San Elizario High School 1972-1997
- Lorenzo G. Alarcon Elementary (Grades 1-6)
- Alfonso Borrego Sr. Elementary (Grades 1-6)
- Josefa L. Sambrano Elementary (Grades 1-6)
- Lorenzo G. Loya Primary (Grades PK-K)
