= Clint Independent School District =

School district in Texas, United States

District information
- Schools: High Schools: 4 Middle Schools: 3 Intermediate Schools: 1 Elementary Schools: 5

Students and staff
- Students: 9,993
- Teachers: 3,075
- Staff: 1,301.4

Other information
- Average Years Experience: 9.6
- Average Teacher Salary: $47,500
- Website: clintweb.net

Clint Independent School District is a public school district in eastern El Paso County, Texas (US).

The Clint Independent School District serves the town of Clint, a portion of Horizon City, and a small section of Socorro, as well as the census-designated places of Agua Dulce, Butterfield, most of Homestead Meadows North, Homestead Meadows South, and Morning Glory. It also includes the "East Montana" area.

Clint Independent School District's superintendent is Juan I. Martinez.

In 2009, the school district was rated "academically acceptable" by the Texas Education Agency. In 2023, Clint ISD was rated #1 in the state of Texas by the Kroger School Food Rankings.

Student Demographics
- Hispanic: 95.4%
- White, not Hispanic: 3.4%
- African American: 0.8%
- Native American: <1%
- Asian/Pacific: <0.1%

== Schools ==
=== High schools ===
- Grades 9-12
  - Clint High School
  - Horizon High School
  - Mountain View High School
  - Clint ISD Early College Academy

=== Middle schools ===
- Grades 6-8
  - Clint Junior High School
  - East Montana Middle School
  - Horizon Middle School
  - Ricardo Estrada Middle School

=== Elementary schools ===
- Grades PK-5
  - Desert Hills Elementary School
  - Montana Vista Elementary School
  - Red Sands Elementary School
  - William D. Surratt Elementary School
  - Carroll T. Welch Elementary School
  - Frank Macias Elementary School

== See also ==
- List of school districts in Texas
