= Butterfield, Texas =

- Census-designated place
- Location within the state of Texas
- Coordinates: 31°50′33″N 106°04′56″W
- Country: United States
- State: Texas
- County: El Paso

Area
  - Total: 3.2 sq mi (8.2 km^{2})
  - Land: 3.2 sq mi (8.2 km^{2})
  - Water: 0 sq mi (0.0 km^{2})
- Elevation: 4,393 ft (1,339 m)

Population (2020)
  - Total: 100
  - Density: 32/sq mi (12/km^{2})
- Time zone: UTC-7 (Mountain (MST))
  - Summer (DST): UTC-6 (MDT)
- ZIP Code: 79938
- FIPS code: 48-11626
- GNIS feature ID: 2407930

Butterfield is a census-designated place (CDP) in El Paso County, Texas, United States. The population was 100 at the 2020 census. It is part of the El Paso Metropolitan Statistical Area. The ZIP Code encompassing the CDP area is 79938.

== Geography ==
According to the United States Census Bureau, the CDP has a total area of 3.2 square miles (8.3 km^{2}), all land.

== Demographics ==
Historical population
Census	Pop.	Note	%±
2000	61		—
2010	114		86.9%
2020	100		−12.3%
U.S. Decennial Census; 1850–1900 1910; 1920 1930 1940; 1950 1960 1970; 1980 1990 2000; 2010 2020

Butterfield first appeared as a census designated place in the 2000 U.S. census.

Butterfield CDP, Texas – Racial and ethnic composition Note: the US Census treats Hispanic/Latino as an ethnic category. This table excludes Latinos from the racial categories and assigns them to a separate category. Hispanics/Latinos may be of any race.
Race / Ethnicity (NH = Non-Hispanic)	Pop 2000	Pop 2010	Pop 2020	% 2000	% 2010	% 2020
White alone (NH)	11	8	8	18.03%	7.02%	8.00%
Black or African American alone (NH)	0	0	0	0.00%	0.00%	0.00%
Native American or Alaska Native alone (NH)	0	0	0	0.00%	0.00%	0.00%
Asian alone (NH)	0	0	0	0.00%	0.00%	0.00%
Native Hawaiian or Pacific Islander alone (NH)	0	0	0	0.00%	0.00%	0.00%
Other race alone (NH)	0	0	0	0.00%	0.00%	0.00%
Mixed race or Multiracial (NH)	0	0	2	0.00%	0.00%	2.00%
Hispanic or Latino (any race)	50	106	90	81.97%	92.98%	90.00%
Total	61	114	100	100.00%	100.00%	100.00%

=== 2000 census ===
As of the census of 2000, there were 61 people, 18 households, and 14 families residing in the CDP. The population density was 19.3 people per square mile (7.5/km^{2}). There were 21 housing units at an average density of 6.6/sq mi (2.6/km^{2}). The racial makeup of the CDP was 85.25% White, 6.56% from other races, and 8.20% from two or more races.

There were 18 households, out of which 50.0% had children under the age of 18 living with them, 55.6% were married couples living together, 22.2% had a female householder with no husband present, and 16.7% were non-families. 16.7% of all households were made up of individuals, and 5.6% had someone living alone who was 65 years of age or older. The average household size was 3.39 and the average family size was 3.73.

In the CDP, the population was spread out, with 32.8% under the age of 18, 11.5% from 18 to 24, 31.1% from 25 to 44, 21.3% from 45 to 64, and 3.3% who were 65 years of age or older. The median age was 30 years. For every 100 females, there were 103.3 males. For every 100 females age 18 and over, there were 78.3 males.

The median income for a household in the CDP was $8,750, and the median income for a family was $8,750. Males had a median income of $0 versus $6,250 for females. The per capita income for the CDP was $4,526. There were 100.0% of families and 100.0% of the population living below the poverty line, including none under 18 and none of those over 64.

== Education ==
Butterfield is served by the Clint Independent School District.
