= Clint High School =

Public school in Texas, United States

Coordinates: 31.5939°N 106.2379°W

- 13890 Alameda Ave; Clint, Texas 79836 United States

Information
- Type: Public
- Established: 1965
- School district: Clint Independent School District
- Principal: Garrett Ritchey
- Staff: 48.36 (FTE)
- Grades: 9-12
- Student to teacher ratio: 15.18
- Colors: Blue and White
- Athletics: 2-4A
- Athletics conference: UIL
- Mascot: Lion
- Website: chs.clintweb.net

Clint High School is a public school in Clint, Texas,(United States). It is part of the Clint Independent School District.

== History ==
The railroad came to El Paso County and through Clint in 1881. At that time, the area was called San Elizario after the town three miles to the west. When a small town began to develop around the railroad tracks, a station was built. Mrs. Clinton Collins, a resident of the emerging community, received permission to establish a post office in 1907. She decided to declare the post office Clint, a shortened version of her maiden name. As the community began to grow and prosper, it became apparent that the emerging town needed to provide for basic services to families, which included the education of the local children. The first school in Clint was established in 1910. New buildings were added in 1913 and 1921. A devastating fire for the community and the High School occurred in 1934. Clint High School re-opened for the 1936-37 school years. Several improvements were made to the school while it was at that site. Overcrowding became a problem concurrently with the need for an elementary school. The decision was reached to build a new high school near the existing one. The New Clint High School site was opened for the 1965-66 school year. In the 1965-66 student handbook, the student body was small enough that every student in the school was listed along with their address and phone number. Over the years, the current campus has literally metamorphosed to the facility as we see it today. The enrollment in 2001, of 998 students, was probably beyond the imaginations of those who planned the new larger facility in the 1960s. Among the most recent changes are the addition of a new larger gymnasium; a new wing of classrooms; a physical education facility, which houses the training room and a classroom; a cafeteria; and a new library. The library is a joint effort of both the school district and the Town of Clint, which creates the CHS/Public Library. The community continues to grow and Clint High School as part of Clint Independent School District is among the fastest growing districts in the state of Texas. The district is currently a member of the Fast Growth District Coalition. The Board of Education and Administrators continue to plan for that growth and for added services for our students.

== Notable alumni ==
- Vickie Guerrero, a former General Manager of WWE Smackdown, graduated from Clint High School in 1986.

== Extracurricular activities ==
=== Clubs and organizations ===
- Marching Band
- Concert Band
- Percussion Ensemble
- Student Council
- JROTC
- Newspaper Staff
- National Honor Society
- Speech and Debate
- Flags
- F.F.A.
- Robotics

== Sports ==
=== Boys ===
- Football
- Basketball
- Baseball
- Tennis
- Track & Field
- Cross Country
- Golf
- Soccer

=== Girls ===
- Cheerleading
- Volleyball
- Basketball
- Softball
- Tennis
- Track & Field
- Cross Country
- Golf
- Soccer
