= San Elizario, Texas =

- City
- Statue of William Bonney, or "Billy the Kid," in the arts district of little San Elizario, near El Paso, Texas

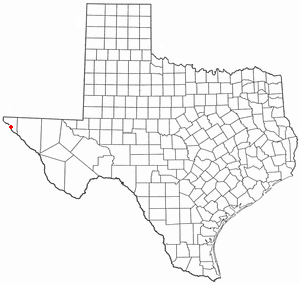
- Location of San Elizario, Texas

- Coordinates: 31°33′58″N 106°14′57″W
- Country: United States
- State: Texas
- County: El Paso
- Incorporated: November 5, 2013

Government
  - Type: Mayor-council

Area
  - Total: 6.88 sq mi (17.83 km^{2})
  - Land: 6.88 sq mi (17.83 km^{2})
  - Water: 0.0039 sq mi (0.01 km^{2})
- Elevation: 3,639 ft (1,109 m)

Population (2020)
  - Total: 10,116
  - Density: 1,469/sq mi (567.4/km^{2})
- Time zone: UTC-7 (Mountain (MST))
  - Summer (DST): UTC-6 (MDT)
- ZIP code: 79849
- Area code: 915
- FIPS code: 48-65360
- GNIS feature ID: 2770964
- Website: cityofsanelizario.com

San Elizario is a city in El Paso County, Texas, United States. Its population was 10,116 at the 2020 census. It is part of the El Paso metropolitan statistical area. It lies on the Rio Grande, which forms the border between the United States and Mexico. The city of Socorro adjoins it on the west and the town of Clint lies to the north.

== History ==
=== La Toma: The Official Act of Possession ===
In 1598, Juan de Oñate, a Spanish nobleman and conquistador born in Zacatecas, Mexico, led a group of 539 colonists and 7,000 head of livestock (including horses, oxen, and cattle) from southern Chihuahua to settle the province of New Mexico. The caravan traveled a northeasterly route for weeks across the desert until it reached the banks of the Rio Grande in the San Elizario area. A mass was held, a blessing of the standard and a celebration. Oñate performed the ceremony of La Toma ("Taking Possession"), in which he claimed the new province for King Philip II of Spain. This is considered to be the "Birth of the American Southwest".

=== Hacienda de los Tiburcios ===
The settlement that became San Elizario was first established sometime before 1760 as the civilian settlement of Hacienda de los Tiburcios. The hacienda was located along the route of Camino Real de Tierra Adentro southeast of Socorro on the west bank of the Rio Grande. The hacienda was eventually abandoned by the 1770s.

=== Presidio San Elzeario ===
In 1789, the site of the old hacienda Tiburcios became the new site where the Spaniards relocated a fort called Presidio de San Elzeario. It had originally been established in 1774, located farther south in the El Paso Valley near the site of modern El Porvenir. It had been moved north to be better able to protect the Camino Real and the towns of to its north, Socorro and Ysleta.

The town that grew up around the presidio took its name San Elzeario, or San Elceario (Spanish for Saint Elzear); Saint Elzéar of Sabran is the Roman Catholic patron saint of soldiers. After the Americans acquired the town at the end of the Mexican American War, its name was Americanized as San Elizario.

=== San Elizario ===
San Elizario was El Paso County's original county seat.

==== Salt War ====
In 1877, a conflict, the Salt War, broke out between the town and a troop of Texas Rangers. The Rangers surrendered and two were massacred by the local population. The perpetrators then fled into Mexico and the town lost much of its status.

==== Incorporation ====
San Elizario was incorporated several times between 1871 and 1911, with another unsuccessful attempt at incorporation made in 1986. On November 5, 2013, San Elizario residents voted to re-incorporate the town, having successfully fought off an attempt by Socorro to annex a portion of it, and San Elizario was officially incorporated when El Paso County Judge Veronica Escobar signed an order of incorporation on November 18, 2013.

On May 10, 2014, Maya Sanchez, who led the push to incorporate San Elizario, was elected mayor by a wide margin over two other candidates, while Leticia Hurtado-Miranda, David Cantu, Miguel Najera, Jr., Rebecca Martinez-Juarez, and George Almanzar were elected to the five city council seats.

== Geography ==
According to the United States Census Bureau, the city has a total area of 6.885 square miles (17.833 km^{2}), of which 0.0027 square miles (0.007 km^{2}) is covered by water.

== Demographics ==
Historical population
Census	Pop.	Note	%±
1980	1,548		—
1990	4,385		183.3%
2000	11,046		151.9%
2010	13,603		23.1%
2020	10,116		−25.6%
U.S. Decennial Census; 1850–1900 1910; 1920 1930 1940; 1950 1960 1970; 1980 1990 2000; 2010

=== 2020 census ===
San Elizario first appeared as a census designated place in the 1980 United States census; and after incorporation in 2013, as a city in the 2020 U.S. census.

As of the 2020 census, San Elizario had a population of 10,116 and 2,168 families in the city. The median age was 30.7 years. 30.1% of residents were under the age of 18 and 10.2% of residents were 65 years of age or older. For every 100 females there were 94.3 males, and for every 100 females age 18 and over there were 91.1 males age 18 and over.

99.1% of residents lived in urban areas, while 0.9% lived in rural areas.

There were 2,942 households in San Elizario, of which 51.1% had children under the age of 18 living in them. Of all households, 52.7% were married-couple households, 14.2% were households with a male householder and no spouse or partner present, and 27.1% were households with a female householder and no spouse or partner present. About 13.5% of all households were made up of individuals and 5.1% had someone living alone who was 65 years of age or older.

There were 3,258 housing units, of which 9.7% were vacant. The homeowner vacancy rate was 1.3% and the rental vacancy rate was 12.2%.

Racial composition as of the 2020 census
Race	Number	Percent
White	3,188	31.5%
Black or African American	36	0.4%
American Indian and Alaska Native	100	1.0%
Asian	5	0.0%
Native Hawaiian and Other Pacific Islander	0	0.0%
Some other race	3,083	30.5%
Two or more races	3,704	36.6%
Hispanic or Latino (of any race)	9,873	97.6%

=== 2000 census ===
As of the census of 2000, 11,046 people, 2,624 households, and 2,440 families resided in the CDP. The population density was 1,112.8 inhabitants per square mile (429.7/km^{2}). There were 2,809 housing units at an average density of 283.0 per square mile (109.3/km^{2}). The racial makeup of the CDP was 94.34% White, 0.15% African American, 5.55% Native American, 0.01% Asian, 0.01% Pacific Islander, 4.18% from other races, and 0.76% from two or more races. Hispanics or Latinos of any race were 97.88% of the population. Of those 98.88% who identify themselves as Hispanic, 95.02% identify themselves as Mexican, making San Elizario the most Mexican (though not Hispanic, see Mila Doce, Texas) town in the United States.

Of the 2,624 households, 67.3% had children under the age of 18 living with them, 73.8% were married couples living together, 15.2% had a female householder with no husband present, and 7.0% were not families. About 6.3% of all households were made up of individuals, and 2.1% had someone living alone who was 65 years of age or older. The average household size was 4.21 and the average family size was 4.40.

In the CDP, the population was distributed as 42.3% under the age of 18, 11.0% from 18 to 24, 28.6% from 25 to 44, 13.4% from 45 to 64, and 4.7% who were 65 years of age or older. The median age was 22 years. For every 100 females, there were 99.4 males. For every 100 females age 18 and over, there were 94.4 males.

The median income for a household in the CDP was $20,145, and for a family was $20,772. Males had a median income of $16,689 versus $12,648 for females. The per capita income for the CDP was $5,915. About 40.2% of families and 44.5% of the population were below the poverty line, including 51.8% of those under age 18 and 20.3% of those age 65 or over.

== Education ==
San Elizario is served by the San Elizario Independent School District.

== San Elizario Chapel ==
San Elizario Chapel (La Capilla de San Elcear) was never a mission, but it functioned as a presidio chapel. It provided the religious needs of a presidio or outpost of military personnel. The presidio was moved to the present site in 1789, to protect travelers and settlers along the Camino Real (Royal Highway) which ran from Mexico City through Ciudad Juárez, then called "Paso del Norte", to Santa Fe, New Mexico. Its close proximity to the Ysleta and Socorro missions also provided protection for them.

When Mexico became independent from Spain in 1821, the military presence at the presidio decreased. By 1848, the presidio had fallen into ruins. Rebuilding efforts began in 1853, with a small church. This proved inadequate, and the present structure was completed in 1882. The exterior appearance has changed very little since then.

The wedding scene for the movie Fandango (1985) was filmed in the plaza of the San Elizario church.

== Notable people ==
- Ricardo Pepi, professional soccer player
