= Homestead Meadows North, Texas =

- Census-designated place
- Coordinates: 31°51′44″N 106°10′38″W
- Country: United States
- State: Texas
- County: El Paso

Area
  - Total: 15.6 sq mi (40.4 km^{2})
  - Land: 15.6 sq mi (40.4 km^{2})
  - Water: 0 sq mi (0.0 km^{2})
- Elevation: 4,075 ft (1,242 m)

Population (2020)
  - Total: 5,210
  - Density: 334/sq mi (129/km^{2})
- Time zone: UTC-7 (Mountain (MST))
  - Summer (DST): UTC-6 (MDT)
- ZIP code: 79938
- FIPS code: 48-34671
- GNIS feature ID: 1852712

Homestead Meadows North is a census-designated place (CDP) in El Paso County, Texas, United States. As of the 2020 census, Homestead Meadows North had a population of 5,210. It is part of the El Paso Metropolitan Statistical Area.

== Geography ==
According to the United States Census Bureau, the CDP has a total area of 15.6 square miles (40.4 km^{2}), all land.

== Demographics ==
Historical population
Census	Pop.	Note	%±
2000	4,232		—
2010	5,124		21.1%
2020	5,210		1.7%
U.S. Decennial Census; 1850–1900 1910; 1920 1930 1940; 1950 1960 1970; 1980 1990 2000; 2010

Homestead Meadows North first appeared as a census designated place in the 2000 U.S. census created out of part of the deleted Homestead Meadows CDP.

=== 2020 census ===
Homestead Meadows North CDP, Texas – Racial and ethnic composition Note: the US Census treats Hispanic/Latino as an ethnic category. This table excludes Latinos from the racial categories and assigns them to a separate category. Hispanics/Latinos may be of any race.
Race / Ethnicity (NH = Non-Hispanic)	Pop 2000	Pop 2010	Pop 2020	% 2000	% 2010	% 2020
White alone (NH)	695	480	533	16.42%	9.37%	10.23%
Black or African American alone (NH)	11	18	32	0.26%	0.35%	0.61%
Native American or Alaska Native alone (NH)	19	16	12	0.45%	0.31%	0.23%
Asian alone (NH)	0	7	9	0.00%	0.14%	0.17%
Native Hawaiian or Pacific Islander alone (NH)	2	1	4	0.05%	0.02%	0.08%
Other race alone (NH)	3	5	13	0.07%	0.10%	0.25%
Mixed race or Multiracial (NH)	11	9	35	0.26%	0.18%	0.67%
Hispanic or Latino (any race)	3,491	4,588	4,572	82.49%	89.54%	87.75%
Total	4,232	5,124	5,210	100.00%	100.00%	100.00%

As of the 2020 United States census, there were 5,210 people, 1,409 households, and 1,132 families residing in the CDP.

=== 2000 census ===
As of the census of 2000, there were 4,232 people, 1,135 households, and 988 families residing in the CDP. The population density was 254.4 inhabitants per square mile (98.2/km^{2}). There were 1,268 housing units at an average density of 76.2 per square mile (29.4/km^{2}). The racial makeup of the CDP was 73.20% White, 0.43% African American, 1.11% Native American, 0.14% Pacific Islander, 22.71% from other races, and 2.41% from two or more races. Hispanic or Latino of any race were 82.49% of the population.

There were 1,135 households, out of which 58.0% had children under the age of 18 living with them, 71.5% were married couples living together, 11.4% had a female householder with no husband present, and 12.9% were non-families. 10.9% of all households were made up of individuals, and 2.7% had someone living alone who was 65 years of age or older. The average household size was 3.73 and the average family size was 4.04.

In the CDP, the population was spread out, with 36.6% under the age of 18, 10.9% from 18 to 24, 28.4% from 25 to 44, 18.8% from 45 to 64, and 5.2% who were 65 years of age or older. The median age was 27 years. For every 100 females, there were 100.4 males. For every 100 females age 18 and over, there were 99.2 males.

The median income for a household in the CDP was $30,403, and the median income for a family was $31,547. Males had a median income of $21,694 versus $18,961 for females. The per capita income for the CDP was $10,485. About 22.9% of families and 21.4% of the population were below the poverty line, including 28.4% of those under age 18 and 14.6% of those age 65 or over.

== Education ==
Almost all of Homestead Meadows North is served by the Clint Independent School District. A small fragment is in the Socorro Independent School District.

The fragment in Socorro ISD is zoned to Purple Heart Elementary School, Desert Wind Middle School, and El Dorado High School.
