= Morning Glory, Texas =

- Census-designated place
- Coordinates: 31°33′53″N 106°12′32″W
- Country: United States
- State: Texas
- County: El Paso

Area
  - Total: 1.1 sq mi (2.8 km^{2})
  - Land: 1.1 sq mi (2.8 km^{2})
  - Water: 0 sq mi (0.0 km^{2})
- Elevation: 3,629 ft (1,106 m)

Population (2020)
  - Total: 522
  - Density: 480/sq mi (190/km^{2})
- Time zone: UTC-7 (Mountain (MST))
  - Summer (DST): UTC-6 (MDT)
- ZIP code: 79836
- FIPS code: 48-49411
- GNIS feature ID: 2408869

Morning Glory is a census-designated place (CDP) in El Paso County, Texas, United States. The population was 522 at the 2020 census, down from 651 at the 2010 census. It is part of the El Paso Metropolitan Statistical Area. The ZIP Code encompassing the CDP area is 79836.

== Geography ==
According to the United States Census Bureau, the CDP has a total area of 1.1 square miles (2.8 km^{2}), all land.

== Demographics ==
Historical population
Census	Pop.	Note	%±
2000	627		—
2010	651		3.8%
2020	522		−19.8%
U.S. Decennial Census; 1850–1900 1910; 1920 1930 1940; 1950 1960 1970; 1980 1990 2000; 2010 2020

Morning Glory first appeared as a census designated place in the 2000 U.S. census.

=== 2020 census ===
Morning Glory South CDP, Texas – Racial and ethnic composition Note: the US Census treats Hispanic/Latino as an ethnic category. This table excludes Latinos from the racial categories and assigns them to a separate category. Hispanics/Latinos may be of any race.
Race / Ethnicity (NH = Non-Hispanic)	Pop 2000	Pop 2010	Pop 2020	% 2000	% 2010	% 2020
White alone (NH)	22	13	11	3.51%	2.00%	2.11%
Black or African American alone (NH)	0	0	0	0.00%	0.00%	0.00%
Native American or Alaska Native alone (NH)	0	0	0	0.00%	0.00%	0.00%
Asian alone (NH)	0	0	0	0.00%	0.00%	0.00%
Native Hawaiian or Pacific Islander alone (NH)	0	0	0	0.00%	0.00%	0.00%
Other race alone (NH)	0	0	0	0.00%	0.00%	0.00%
Mixed race or Multiracial (NH)	1	0	3	0.16%	0.00%	0.57%
Hispanic or Latino (any race)	604	638	508	96.33%	98.00%	97.32%
Total	627	651	522	100.00%	100.00%	100.00%

=== 2000 census ===
As of the census of 2000, there were 627 people, 145 households, and 140 families residing in the CDP. The population density was 585.1 inhabitants per square mile (225.9/km^{2}). There were 161 housing units at an average density of 150.3 per square mile (58.0/km^{2}). The racial makeup of the CDP was 88.68% White, 0.48% Native American, 10.53% from other races, and 0.32% from two or more races. Hispanic or Latino of any race were 96.33% of the population.

There were 145 households, out of which 66.9% had children under the age of 18 living with them, 80.7% were married couples living together, 11.0% had a female householder with no husband present, and 3.4% were non-families. 2.8% of all households were made up of individuals, and 0.7% had someone living alone who was 65 years of age or older. The average household size was 4.32 and the average family size was 4.41.

In the CDP, the population was spread out, with 42.4% under the age of 18, 10.4% from 18 to 24, 28.2% from 25 to 44, 15.2% from 45 to 64, and 3.8% who were 65 years of age or older. The median age was 23 years. For every 100 females, there were 103.6 males. For every 100 females age 18 and over, there were 97.3 males.

The median income for a household in the CDP was $31,154, and the median income for a family was $30,096. Males had a median income of $21,250 versus $13,750 for females. The per capita income for the CDP was $7,754. About 8.9% of families and 10.4% of the population were below the poverty line, including 16.4% of those under age 18 and none of those age 65 or over.

== Education ==
Morning Glory is served by the Clint Independent School District.
