= Fabens, Texas =

- Census-designated place
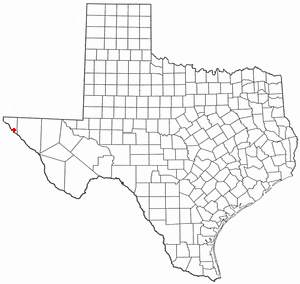
- Location of Fabens, Texas

- Coordinates: 31°30′18″N 106°09′00″W
- Country: United States
- State: Texas
- County: El Paso

Area
  - Total: 4.35 sq mi (11.26 km^{2})
  - Land: 4.32 sq mi (11.20 km^{2})
  - Water: 0.023 sq mi (0.06 km^{2})
- Elevation: 3,632 ft (1,107 m)

Population (2020)
  - Total: 7,498
  - Density: 1,734/sq mi (669.5/km^{2})
- Time zone: UTC-7 (Mountain (MST))
  - Summer (DST): UTC-6 (MDT)
- ZIP codes: 79836 & 79838
- Area code: 915
- FIPS code: 48-25032
- GNIS feature ID: 2408099

Fabens is a census-designated place (CDP) in El Paso County, Texas, United States. As of the 2020 census, Fabens had a population of 7,498. It is part of the El Paso Metropolitan Statistical Area. The ZIP Codes encompassing the CDP area are 79836 and 79838.

Fabens is the birthplace of jockey Bill Shoemaker.

== Geography ==
According to the United States Census Bureau, the CDP has a total area of 4.35 square miles (11.26 km^{2}), of which 4.32 square miles (11.20 km^{2}) is land and 0.023 square miles (0.06 km^{2}), or 0.52%, is water.

Fabens is approximately 30 miles (48 km) southeast of El Paso along the Rio Grande and Interstate Highway 10. Most visitors only stop for short periods of time to eat at one of the several restaurants or stay overnight in the hotel.

== History ==
The city name of Fabens comes from attorney George Wilson Fabens, who worked for the Southern Pacific Railroad. He was the assistant land commissioner for the Southern Pacific Lines in Texas and Louisiana. As the railroad was being built, new towns were named after railroad officers.

=== Film location ===
In April 1972, Fabens served as a location for the filming of the Sam Peckinpah film The Getaway.

=== 2005 border incident ===
On February 17, 2005, Fabens was the nearest location to a border incident that made national headlines, when Border Patrol agents Ignacio Ramos and Jose Compean were convicted and sentenced to prison terms of eleven and ten years, respectively, for shooting Osbaldo Aldrete-Davila, an undocumented immigrant and alleged drug smuggler who was unarmed when he was shot. Aldrete-Davila was given immunity for his testimony and sued the Border Patrol for $5 million for violation of his civil rights.

Ramos and Compean had their sentences commuted by President George W. Bush during his last full day in office on January 19, 2009, although they did not receive a pardon for their convictions. They were released from prison on March 20, 2009, and in December 2020 President Donald Trump pardoned them for their crimes.

== Demographics ==
Historical population
Census	Pop.	Note	%±
1960	3,134		—
1970	3,241		3.4%
1980	4,285		32.2%
1990	5,599		30.7%
2000	8,043		43.7%
2010	8,257		2.7%
2020	7,498		−9.2%
U.S. Decennial Census; 1850–1900 1910; 1920 1930 1940; 1950 1960 1970; 1980 1990 2000; 2010

Fabens first appeared as an unincorporated place in the 1960 U.S. census; and as a census designated place in the 1980 United States census.

=== 2020 census ===
Fabens CDP, Texas – Racial and ethnic composition Note: the US Census treats Hispanic/Latino as an ethnic category. This table excludes Latinos from the racial categories and assigns them to a separate category. Hispanics/Latinos may be of any race.
Race / Ethnicity (NH = Non-Hispanic)	Pop 2000	Pop 2010	Pop 2020	% 2000	% 2010	% 2020
White alone (NH)	267	240	149	3.32%	2.91%	1.99%
Black or African American alone (NH)	15	6	6	0.19%	0.07%	0.08%
Native American or Alaska Native alone (NH)	9	4	0	0.11%	0.05%	0.00%
Asian alone (NH)	1	6	1	0.01%	0.07%	0.01%
Native Hawaiian or Pacific Islander alone (NH)	0	0	0	0.00%	0.00%	0.00%
Other race alone (NH)	0	2	10	0.00%	0.02%	0.13%
Mixed race or Multiracial (NH)	17	6	17	0.21%	0.07%	0.23%
Hispanic or Latino (any race)	7,734	7,993	7,315	96.16%	96.80%	97.56%
Total	8,043	8,257	7,498	100.00%	100.00%	100.00%

As of the 2020 United States census, there were 7,498 people, 1,511 households, and 1,045 families residing in the CDP.

=== 2000 census ===
As of the census of 2000, there were 8,043 people, 2,147 households, and 1,874 families residing in the CDP. The population density was 2,179.8 inhabitants per square mile (841.6/km^{2}). There were 2,279 housing units at an average density of 617.7 per square mile (238.5/km^{2}). The racial makeup of the CDP is 74.01% White, 0.57% African American, 0.80% Native American, 0.02% Asian, 0.00% Pacific Islander, 21.73% from other races, and 2.86% from two or more races. 96.16% of the population are Hispanic or Latino of any race.

There were 2,147 households, out of which 55.9% had children under the age of 18 living with them, 59.7% were married couples living together, 23.5% had a female householder with no husband present, and 12.7% were non-families. 11.2% of all households were made up of individuals, and 5.6% had someone living alone who was 65 years of age or older. The average household size was 3.75 and the average family size was 4.07.

In the CDP, the population was spread out, with 39.3% under the age of 18, 11.1% from 18 to 24, 26.7% from 25 to 44, 15.1% from 45 to 64, and 7.8% who were 65 years of age or older. The median age was 25 years. For every 100 females, there were 92.2 males. For every 100 females age 18 and over, there were 84.9 males.

The median income for a household in the CDP was $18,486, and the median income for a family was $20,451. Males had a median income of $17,432 versus $16,354 for females. The per capita income for the CDP was $6,647. About 41.2% of families and 43.3% of the population were below the poverty line, including 49.4% of those under age 18 and 40.0% of those age 65 or over.

== Education ==
- Fabens is served by the Fabens Independent School District.
