= Agua Dulce, El Paso County, Texas =

Agua Dulce, Texas
- Unincorporated community Census designated place
- Location of Agua Dulce, Texas
- Coordinates: 31°39′17″N 106°08′13″W
- Country: United States
- State: Texas
- County: El Paso

Area
  - Total: 7.8 sq mi (20.2 km^{2})
  - Land: 7.8 sq mi (20.2 km^{2})
  - Water: 0 sq mi (0 km^{2})
- Elevation: 4,026 ft (1,227 m)

Population (2020)
  - Total: 3,218
  - Density: 413/sq mi (159/km^{2})
- Time zone: UTC-5 (Mountain (MST))
  - Summer (DST): UTC-4 (MDT)
- ZIP code: 79928
- GNIS feature ID: 2407698

Agua Dulce (Spanish: "sweet water", i.e. fresh water, /ɑːwəˈdulsɪ/ ah-wə-DOOL-sih) is an unincorporated community and census-designated place (CDP) in El Paso County, Texas, United States. The population was 3,218 at the 2020 census. It is part of the El Paso Metropolitan Statistical Area. The ZIP Code encompassing the CDP area is 79928.

== Geography ==
According to the United States Census Bureau, the Agua Dulce CDP has an area of 7.8 square miles (20.2 km^{2}), all land.

== Demographics ==
Historical population
Census	Pop.	Note	%±
2000	738		—
2010	3,014		308.4%
2020	3,218		6.8%
U.S. Decennial Census; 1850–1900 1910; 1920 1930 1940; 1950 1960 1970; 1980 1990 2000; 2010 2020

Agua Dulce first appeared as a census designated place in the 2000 U.S. census.

Agua Dulce CDP, Texas – Racial and ethnic composition Note: the US Census treats Hispanic/Latino as an ethnic category. This table excludes Latinos from the racial categories and assigns them to a separate category. Hispanics/Latinos may be of any race.
Race / Ethnicity (NH = Non-Hispanic)	Pop 2000	Pop 2010	Pop 2020	% 2000	% 2010	% 2020
White alone (NH)	31	22	48	4.20%	0.73%	1.49%
Black or African American alone (NH)	4	1	6	0.54%	0.03%	0.19%
Native American or Alaska Native alone (NH)	0	1	3	0.00%	0.03%	0.09%
Asian alone (NH)	0	0	5	0.00%	0.00%	0.16%
Native Hawaiian or Pacific Islander alone (NH)	0	0	0	0.00%	0.00%	0.00%
Other race alone (NH)	0	0	2	0.00%	0.00%	0.06%
Mixed race or Multiracial (NH)	1	0	5	0.14%	0.00%	0.16%
Hispanic or Latino (any race)	702	2,990	3,149	95.12%	99.20%	97.86%
Total	738	3,014	3,218	100.00%	100.00%	100.00%

=== 2020 census ===
As of the 2020 United States census, there were 3,218 people, 616 households, and 495 families residing in the CDP.

=== 2000 census ===
As of the census of 2000, there were 738 people, 179 households, and 158 families residing in the CDP. The population density was 91.3 inhabitants per square mile (35.3/km^{2}). There were 233 housing units at an average density of 28.8 per square mile (11.1/km^{2}). The racial makeup of the CDP was 88.08% White, 1.76% African American, 0.68% Native American, 7.45% from other races, and 2.03% from two or more races.

There were 179 households, out of which 65.9% had children under the age of 18 living with them, 67.0% were married couples living together, 14.0% had a female householder with no husband present, and 11.7% were non-families. 10.1% of all households were made up of individuals, and 0.6% had someone living alone who was 65 years of age or older. The average household size was 4.12 and the average family size was 4.41.

In the CDP, the population was spread out, with 46.2% under the age of 18, 7.9% from 18 to 24, 32.4% from 25 to 44, 11.2% from 45 to 64, and 2.3% who were 65 years of age or older. The median age was 20 years. For every 100 females, there were 106.1 males. For every 100 females age 18 and over, there were 100.5 males.

The median income for a household in the CDP was $16,696, and the median income for a family was $17,500. Males had a median income of $16,667 versus $21,250 for females. The per capita income for the CDP was $5,604. About 50.0% of families and 41.4% of the population were below the poverty line, including 35.8% of those under age 18 and none of those age 65 or over.

== Education ==
Agua Dulce is served by the Clint Independent School District.
