= Newman, Texas =

Neighborhood in El Paso, Texas, US

Coordinates: 31°59′52″N 106°19′40″W

Newman is a small El Paso neighborhood in far Northeast El Paso, located some 16 miles northeast of downtown El Paso around the intersection of Dyer Street and Edge of Texas Drive on the New Mexico state line, and still sometimes described as a separate community. In 1990, it had a population of approximately 60 people.

It was named for real estate developer Henry L. Newman, who earlier tried to develop Newman, New Mexico, just to the north across the New Mexico border, without much success. He fared only moderately better in Texas. In 1930, the United States Census listed Newman as having a population of 10 people.

Newman had a post office from 1922 to 1971.
