= Tornillo, Texas =

- Unincorporated community Census-designated place

- Location within Texas Location within the United States
- Coordinates: 31°26′09″N 106°06′50″W
- Country: United States
- State: Texas
- County: El Paso

Area
  - Total: 3.4 sq mi (8.9 km^{2})
  - Land: 3.4 sq mi (8.9 km^{2})
  - Water: 0 sq mi (0.0 km^{2})
- Elevation: 3,586 ft (1,093 m)

Population (2020)
  - Total: 1,432
  - Density: 420/sq mi (160/km^{2})
- Time zone: UTC-7 (Mountain (MST))
  - Summer (DST): UTC-6 (MDT)
- ZIP codes: 79838 & 79853
- Area code: 915
- FIPS code: 48-73376
- GNIS feature ID: 2409336

Tornillo (/tɔːrˈniːjoʊ/ tor-NEE-yoh) is a border town in El Paso County, Texas, United States. As of the 2020 census, Tornillo had a population of 1,432. For statistical purposes, the United States Census Bureau has defined this unincorporated community as a census-designated place (CDP). It is part of the El Paso metropolitan area. The Tornillo and Guadalupe, Chihuahua, area is connected by the Tornillo–Guadalupe International Bridge.

The town is the home of Sonic Ranch, the world's largest residential recording complex.

In June 2018, the US government opened a tent city detention camp for migrant children at the Marcelino Serna Port of Entry on the Mexican border in Tornillo. By January 11, 2019, the last migrant child had been moved out of the camp en route to, or placed with, vetted sponsors.

== Geography ==
According to the United States Census Bureau, the CDP has a total area of 3.4 square miles (8.8 km^{2}), all land.

The city is located on State Highway 20 and the Southern Pacific Railroad.

=== Climate ===
According to the Köppen Climate Classification system, Tornillo has a desert climate, abbreviated "BWh" on climate maps. Temperatures reach an average high of 96 °F and average low of 62 °F in June, and an average high of 59 °F and average low of 28 °F in December. The annual average rainfall is 9.25 inches.

Climate data for Tornillo, Texas (1991–2020 normals, extremes 1981–present)
Month	Jan	Feb	Mar	Apr	May	Jun	Jul	Aug	Sep	Oct	Nov	Dec	Year
Record high °F (°C)	81 (27)	88 (31)	95 (35)	98 (37)	104 (40)	111 (44)	107 (42)	106 (41)	103 (39)	97 (36)	87 (31)	79 (26)	111 (44)
Mean daily maximum °F (°C)	61.1 (16.2)	67.1 (19.5)	74.9 (23.8)	82.5 (28.1)	90.7 (32.6)	97.7 (36.5)	95.4 (35.2)	93.8 (34.3)	88.7 (31.5)	80.9 (27.2)	69.6 (20.9)	60.1 (15.6)	80.2 (26.8)
Daily mean °F (°C)	44.9 (7.2)	50.1 (10.1)	57.2 (14.0)	64.5 (18.1)	72.2 (22.3)	80.1 (26.7)	81.1 (27.3)	79.9 (26.6)	73.9 (23.3)	64.2 (17.9)	52.4 (11.3)	44.3 (6.8)	63.7 (17.6)
Mean daily minimum °F (°C)	28.8 (−1.8)	33.1 (0.6)	39.5 (4.2)	46.5 (8.1)	53.6 (12.0)	62.6 (17.0)	66.8 (19.3)	65.9 (18.8)	59.0 (15.0)	47.5 (8.6)	35.2 (1.8)	28.5 (−1.9)	47.3 (8.5)
Record low °F (°C)	4 (−16)	−1 (−18)	13 (−11)	27 (−3)	35 (2)	44 (7)	53 (12)	49 (9)	41 (5)	21 (−6)	15 (−9)	−2 (−19)	−2 (−19)
Average precipitation inches (mm)	0.36 (9.1)	0.37 (9.4)	0.25 (6.4)	0.23 (5.8)	0.50 (13)	0.65 (17)	1.68 (43)	1.45 (37)	1.12 (28)	0.77 (20)	0.36 (9.1)	0.54 (14)	8.28 (210)
Average snowfall inches (cm)	0.4 (1.0)	0.2 (0.51)	0.0 (0.0)	0.0 (0.0)	0.0 (0.0)	0.0 (0.0)	0.0 (0.0)	0.0 (0.0)	0.0 (0.0)	0.1 (0.25)	0.3 (0.76)	0.7 (1.8)	1.7 (4.3)
Average precipitation days (≥ 0.01 in)	3.0	3.1	1.9	1.4	2.4	3.4	6.7	6.3	4.5	3.7	2.1	3.1	41.6
Average snowy days (≥ 0.1 in)	0.2	0.0	0.0	0.0	0.0	0.0	0.0	0.0	0.0	0.0	0.0	0.3	0.5
Source: NOAA

== Demographics ==
Historical population
Census	Pop.	Note	%±
2000	1,609		—
2010	1,568		−2.5%
2020	1,432		−8.7%
U.S. Decennial Census; 1850–1900 1910; 1920 1930 1940; 1950 1960 1970; 1980 1990 2000; 2010

Tornillo first appeared as a census designated place in the 2000 U.S. census.

=== 2020 census ===
Tornillo CDP, Texas – Racial and ethnic composition Note: the US Census treats Hispanic/Latino as an ethnic category. This table excludes Latinos from the racial categories and assigns them to a separate category. Hispanics/Latinos may be of any race.
Race / Ethnicity (NH = Non-Hispanic)	Pop 2000	Pop 2010	Pop 2020	% 2000	% 2010	% 2020
White alone (NH)	11	18	30	0.68%	1.15%	2.09%
Black or African American alone (NH)	0	3	0	0.00%	0.19%	0.00%
Native American or Alaska Native alone (NH)	0	0	0	0.00%	0.00%	0.00%
Asian alone (NH)	0	0	0	0.00%	0.00%	0.00%
Native Hawaiian or Pacific Islander alone (NH)	0	0	0	0.00%	0.00%	0.00%
Other race alone (NH)	0	0	0	0.00%	0.00%	0.00%
Mixed race or Multiracial (NH)	3	0	4	0.19%	0.00%	0.28%
Hispanic or Latino (any race)	1,595	1,547	1,398	99.13%	98.66%	97.63%
Total	1,609	1,568	1,432	100.00%	100.00%	100.00%

As of the 2020 United States census, there were 1,432 people, 337 households, and 281 families residing in the CDP.

=== 2000 census ===
As of the census of 2000, there were 1,609 people, 394 households, and 366 families residing in the CDP. The population density was 470.4 inhabitants per square mile (181.6/km^{2}). There were 437 housing units at an average density of 127.8 per square mile (49.3/km^{2}). The racial makeup of the CDP was 97.2% White, 0.56% Native American, 1.58% from other races, and 0.68% from two or more races. Hispanic or Latino were 99.13% of the population.

There were 394 households, out of which 67.0% had children under the age of 18 living with them, 73.1% were married couples living together, 14.5% had a female householder with no husband present, and 6.9% were non-families. 6.6% of all households were made up of individuals, and 2.8% had someone living alone who was 65 years of age or older. The average household size was 4.08 and the average family size was 4.27.

In the CDP, the population was spread out, with 44.0% under the age of 18, 11.2% from 18 to 24, 27.8% from 25 to 44, 11.9% from 45 to 64, and 5.2% who were 65 years of age or older. The median age was 22 years. For every 100 females, there were 92.7 males. For every 100 females age 18 and over, there were 87.3 males.

The median income for a household in the CDP was $19,514, and the median income for a family was $20,329. Males had a median income of $16,955 versus $15,761 for females. The per capita income for the CDP was $5,778. About 36.6% of families and 36.8% of the population were below the poverty line, including 40.4% of those under age 18 and 40.2% of those age 65 or over.

Celebrity former residents include Pro Jockey Willie Shoemaker and Los Angeles radio personality Jamey Karr.

== Education ==
Almost all of Tornillo is served by the Tornillo Independent School District. A small portion lies within the Fabens Independent School District.

== History ==
The town of Tornillo derives its name from the Spanish word for screw-bean bush, a hardy firewood once prevalent in the area. Tornillo was first platted in 1909 by a group of businessmen from El Paso, Texas who had formed the Tornillo Townsite Company. The first post office in the town opened the same year. Tornillo became the first agricultural area to be approved as part of the Rio Grande Irrigation Project after 1916. Cotton became the main crop in the region, however, by 1970, pecans were also a major agricultural crop in the area.
