= Horizon City, Texas =

- City
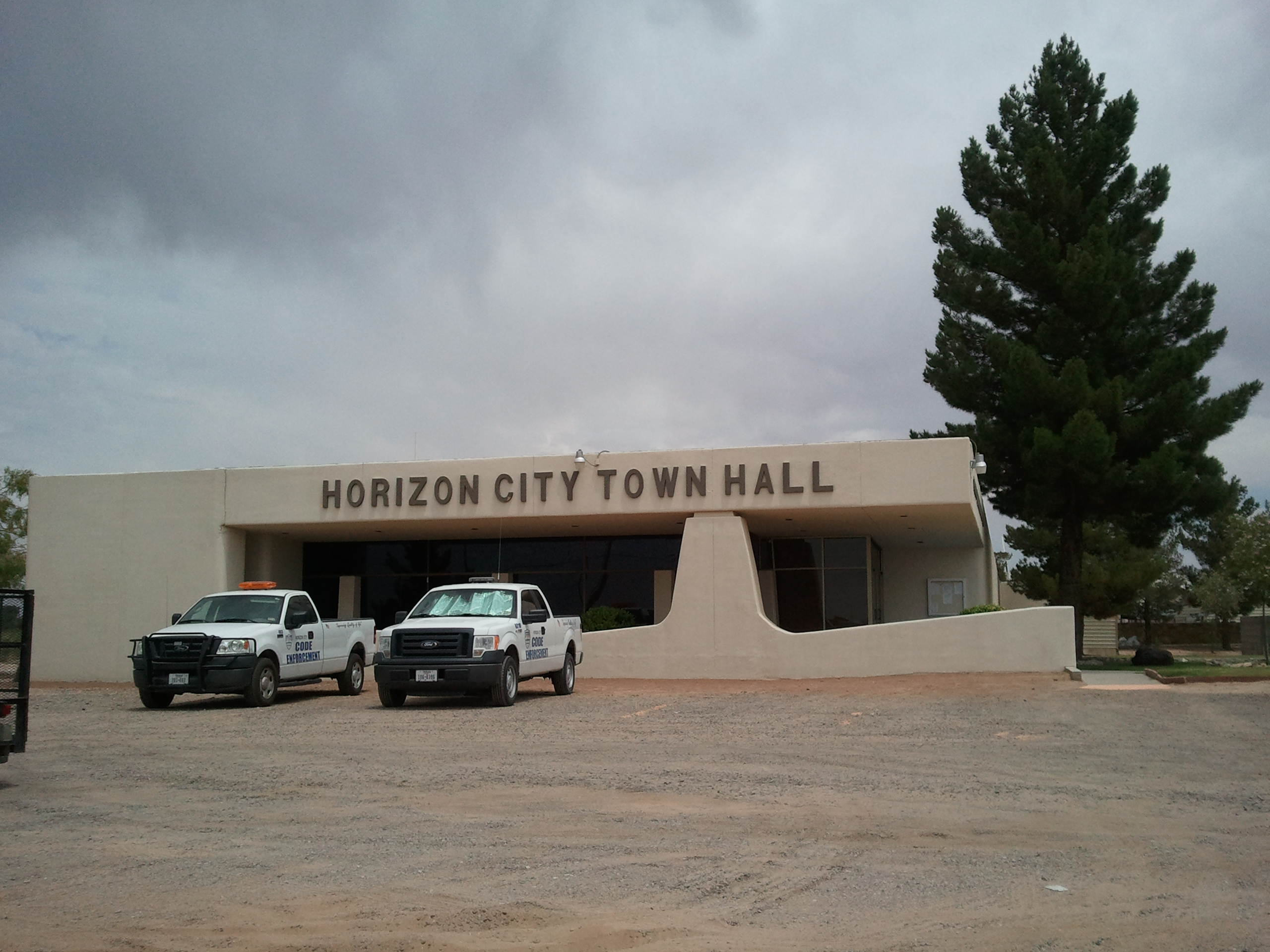
- Horizon City Town Hall

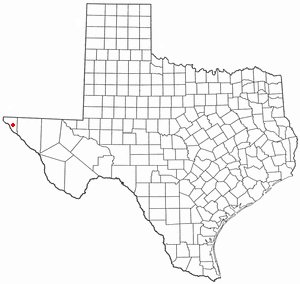
- Location of Horizon City, Texas

- Coordinates: 31°40′48″N 106°11′25″W
- Country: United States
- State: Texas
- County: El Paso
- Founded: 1962
- Incorporated: October 22, 1988

Government
  - Type: Mayor-council

Area
  - Total: 8.72 sq mi (22.58 km^{2})
  - Land: 8.71 sq mi (22.57 km^{2})
  - Water: 0.0039 sq mi (0.01 km^{2})
- Elevation: 4,026 ft (1,227 m)

Population (2020)
  - Total: 22,489
  - Density: 2,254/sq mi (870.3/km^{2})
- Demonym: Horizonite
- Time zone: UTC-7 (Mountain (MST))
  - Summer (DST): UTC-6 (MDT)
- ZIP codes: 79927-79928
- Area code: 915
- FIPS code: 48-34832
- GNIS feature ID: 2410793
- Website: www.horizoncity.org

Horizon City is a city in El Paso County, Texas, United States. As of the 2020 United States Census, its population was 22,489, reflecting an increase of 5,754 from the 16,735 counted in the 2010 Census.

== History ==
The city, incorporated by referendum on October 22, 1988, takes its name from the real-estate development corporation that developed it as a planned community beginning in the early 1960s, the Horizon Corporation. The Horizon Corporation bought up large tracts of land in the southwestern United States, including eastern El Paso County, platted them into subdivisions, and sold lots in them to thousands of people worldwide, often sight unseen, often without access to water or utilities and using questionable sales tactics, between 1962 and 1975. Eventually, the Federal Trade Commission stepped in to stop it in 1981. Only one portion of the development was successful, the area around the intersection of Horizon Boulevard (Farm to Market Road 1281) and Kenazo Street; this became the nucleus of Horizon City.

Much of the land to the east of town consists of undeveloped subdivisions with highly fragmented ownership. The lots in these subdivisions cannot be legally sold and will be difficult to develop due to the 1994 Texas Colonia Act, a state law intended to stop the development of colonias, or neighborhoods underserved by utilities whose residents often live in substandard conditions. It forbids the sale for residential purposes of less than 10 acres of land or the sale of more than 10 acres of land without a guarantee of adequate access to water, sewer services and other utilities. Efforts are currently underway by a local homeowners' association, the Horizon Communities Improvement Association, to assemble these lots into tracts of land that can be legally developed. However, this organization only works with lots within their area. They cannot help any person with a lot outside their area.

People owning these small, original lots may often receive offers to buy the land. Whether these offers are legitimate is unknown.

== Geography ==
According to the United States Census Bureau, the city has a total area of 8.7 square miles (22.6 km^{2}), all land.

=== Climate ===
- Annual maximum avg. temperature = 78.0 °F (25.6 °C)
- Annual minimum avg. temperature = 49.0 °F (9.4 °C)
- Annual avg. Temperature = 63.2 °F (17.3 °C)
- Percentage of possible sunshine = 83
- Mean number of days rain (per year) = 49
- Mean number of days snow (per year) = 2
- Avg. annual precipitation = 9.00 in.
- Avg. annual snowfall = 6.00 in.

== Government ==
The Mayor of Horizon City is Andres "Andy" Renteria. The legislative and governing body of the City consists of a mayor and seven Council Members. The mayor and council are elected to four-year terms. The next election for mayor and Council Members for places 3, 5, and 7 will be in May 2027; the election for Council Members for places 1, 2, 4, and 6 will be in May 2029. The current city council members of Horizon City are Guillermo Ortega, Scott Quiroz, Rosie Ortega, Robert Avila, Katherine Ames, Matthew Gardea, and Ruben Mendoza.

== Economic development ==
Horizon City formed an economic development corporation in 2011. The corporation has the power to use sales tax funds to help eligible companies with relocations, expansions, and site development. It can acquire property, finance infrastructure projects, and spend funds for a variety of quality-of-life improvements.

== Demographics ==
Historical population
Census	Pop.	Note	%±
1990	2,308		—
2000	5,233		126.7%
2010	16,735		219.8%
2020	22,489		34.4%

=== 2020 census ===
As of the 2020 census, Horizon City had a population of 22,489 people living in 6,524 households, including 5,011 families. The median age was 29.1 years.

33.4% of residents were under the age of 18 and 6.6% were 65 years of age or older. For every 100 females there were 95.6 males, and for every 100 females age 18 and over there were 91.9 males age 18 and over.

Racial composition as of the 2020 census
Race	Number	Percent
White	7,574	33.7%
Black or African American	373	1.7%
American Indian and Alaska Native	223	1.0%
Asian	82	0.4%
Native Hawaiian and Other Pacific Islander	19	0.1%
Some other race	6,007	26.7%
Two or more races	8,211	36.5%
Hispanic or Latino (of any race)	20,392	90.7%

97.5% of residents lived in urban areas, while 2.5% lived in rural areas.

There were 6,524 households in Horizon City, of which 58.9% had children under the age of 18 living in them. Of all households, 58.5% were married-couple households, 12.5% were households with a male householder and no spouse or partner present, and 22.4% were households with a female householder and no spouse or partner present. About 11.3% of all households were made up of individuals and 3.1% had someone living alone who was 65 years of age or older.

There were 6,746 housing units, of which 3.3% were vacant. The homeowner vacancy rate was 1.3% and the rental vacancy rate was 5.6%.

=== 2010 census ===
According to the 2010 Census, of the 4,733 households, 64.2% had children under 18 living with them, 66.8% were headed by married couples living together, 14.7% had a female householder with no husband present, and 13.8% were not families. About 10.8% of all households were made up of individuals, and 2.4% were someone living alone who was 65 years of age older. The average household size was 3.54, and the average family size was 3.83.

In the city, the age distribution was 38.2% under the age of 18, 9.2% from 18 to 24, 32.1% from 25 to 44, 16.0% from 45 to 64, and 4.5% who were 65 or older. The median age was 26.6 years. For every 100 females, there were 94.6 males. For every 100 females age 18 and over, there were 89.2 males.

For the year 2019, the estimated median annual income for a household in the city was $60,431. The per capita income for the city was $21,507. About 13.3% of the population was below the poverty line.

== Education ==
Horizon City is served by the Clint and Socorro Independent School Districts.

The Socorro Independent School District serves the city center and adjacent neighborhoods on the west end of town; the boundary between it and the Clint Independent School District to the east is located at or near Kenazo Street.

=== Schools serving Horizon City ===
==== Clint Independent School District campuses ====
- Horizon High School [9th to 12th]
- Horizon Middle School [6th to 8th]
- Ricardo Estrada Middle School [6th to 8th]
- Carroll T. Welch Intermediate School [Pre-K to 5th]
- Desert Hills Elementary School [Pre-K to 5th]
- Frank Macias Elementary School [Pre-K to 5th]

==== Socorro Independent School District campuses ====
The zoned schools are:

- Eastlake High School [9th to 12th]
- Col. John O. Ensor Middle School [6th to 8th]
- Horizon Heights Elementary School [Pre-K to 5th]

==== Other ====
- Pete Duarte Head Start Center (Texas Education Agency, Region 19) [Pre-K]

== Government and infrastructure ==
The Texas Department of Criminal Justice operates the El Paso II District Parole Office in an unincorporated area east of Horizon City.
