= Clint, Texas =

- Town
- Town of Clint
- Seal

- Location within the state of Texas
- Coordinates: 31°35′24″N 106°13′44″W
- Country: United States
- State: Texas
- County: El Paso

Area
  - Total: 1.97 sq mi (5.11 km^{2})
  - Land: 1.97 sq mi (5.09 km^{2})
  - Water: 0.0077 sq mi (0.02 km^{2})
- Elevation: 3,639 ft (1,109 m)

Population (2020)
  - Total: 923
  - Density: 470/sq mi (181/km^{2})
- Time zone: UTC-7 (Mountain (MST))
  - Summer (DST): UTC-6 (MDT)
- ZIP code: 79836
- Area code: 915
- FIPS code: 48-15544
- GNIS feature ID: 2413216
- Website: www.clinttexas.com

Clint is a town in El Paso County, Texas, United States. The population was 923 at the 2020 census. It is part of the El Paso Metropolitan Statistical Area.

== Geography ==
According to the United States Census Bureau, the town has a total area of 2.0 square miles (5.2 km^{2}), of which 2.0 square miles (5.2 km^{2}) is land and 0.51% is water.

== Demographics ==
Historical population
| Census | Pop. | Note | %± |
|---|---|---|---|
| 1980 | 1,314 | | — |
| 1990 | 1,035 | | −21.2% |
| 2000 | 980 | | −5.3% |
| 2010 | 926 | | −5.5% |
| 2020 | 923 | | −0.3% |
U.S. Decennial Census

=== 2020 census ===
Clint racial composition (NH = Non-Hispanic) (Note: Note: the US Census treats Hispanic/Latino as an ethnic category. This table excludes Latinos from the racial categories and assigns them to a separate category. Hispanics/Latinos can be of any race.)
| Race | Number | Percentage |
|---|---|---|
| White (NH) | 102 | 11.05% |
| Black or African American (NH) | 4 | 0.43% |
| Native American or Alaska Native (NH) | 2 | 0.22% |
| Some Other Race (NH) | 1 | 0.11% |
| Mixed/Multi-Racial (NH) | 7 | 0.76% |
| Hispanic or Latino | 807 | 87.43% |
| Total | 923 | |

As of the 2020 United States census, there were 923 people, 244 households, and 168 families residing in the town.

=== 2000 census ===
As of the census of 2000, there were 980 people, 308 households, and 255 families residing in the town. The population density was 502.4 inhabitants per square mile (194.0/km^{2}). There were 337 housing units at an average density of 172.8 per square mile (66.7/km^{2}). The racial makeup of the town was 75.41% White, 0.20% African American, 0.41% Native American, 0.41% Asian, 0.10% Pacific Islander, 20.71% from other races, and 2.76% from two or more races. Hispanic or Latino of any race were 83.98% of the population.

There were 308 households, out of which 35.4% had children under the age of 18 living with them, 64.6% were married couples living together, 14.3% had a female householder with no husband present, and 16.9% were non-families. 15.3% of all households were made up of individuals, and 7.1% had someone living alone who was 65 years of age or older. The average household size was 3.18 and the average family size was 3.58.

In the town, the population was spread out, with 26.5% under the age of 18, 10.5% from 18 to 24, 23.3% from 25 to 44, 26.5% from 45 to 64, and 13.2% who were 65 years of age or older. The median age was 38 years. For every 100 females, there were 100.0 males. For every 100 females age 18 and over, there were 93.0 males.

The median income for a household in the town was $34,000, and the median income for a family was $36,635. Males had a median income of $29,205 versus $20,313 for females. The per capita income for the town was $14,784. About 16.6% of families and 20.0% of the population were below the poverty line, including 25.6% of those under age 18 and 16.8% of those age 65 or over.

== Education ==
The Town of Clint is served by the Clint Independent School District. It is zoned to Clint High School, Clint Junior High School, and Surratt Elementary School, all located in Clint. Clint Early College High School, which serves the Clint Independent School District, is also located in Clint.

== Children detention camp ==
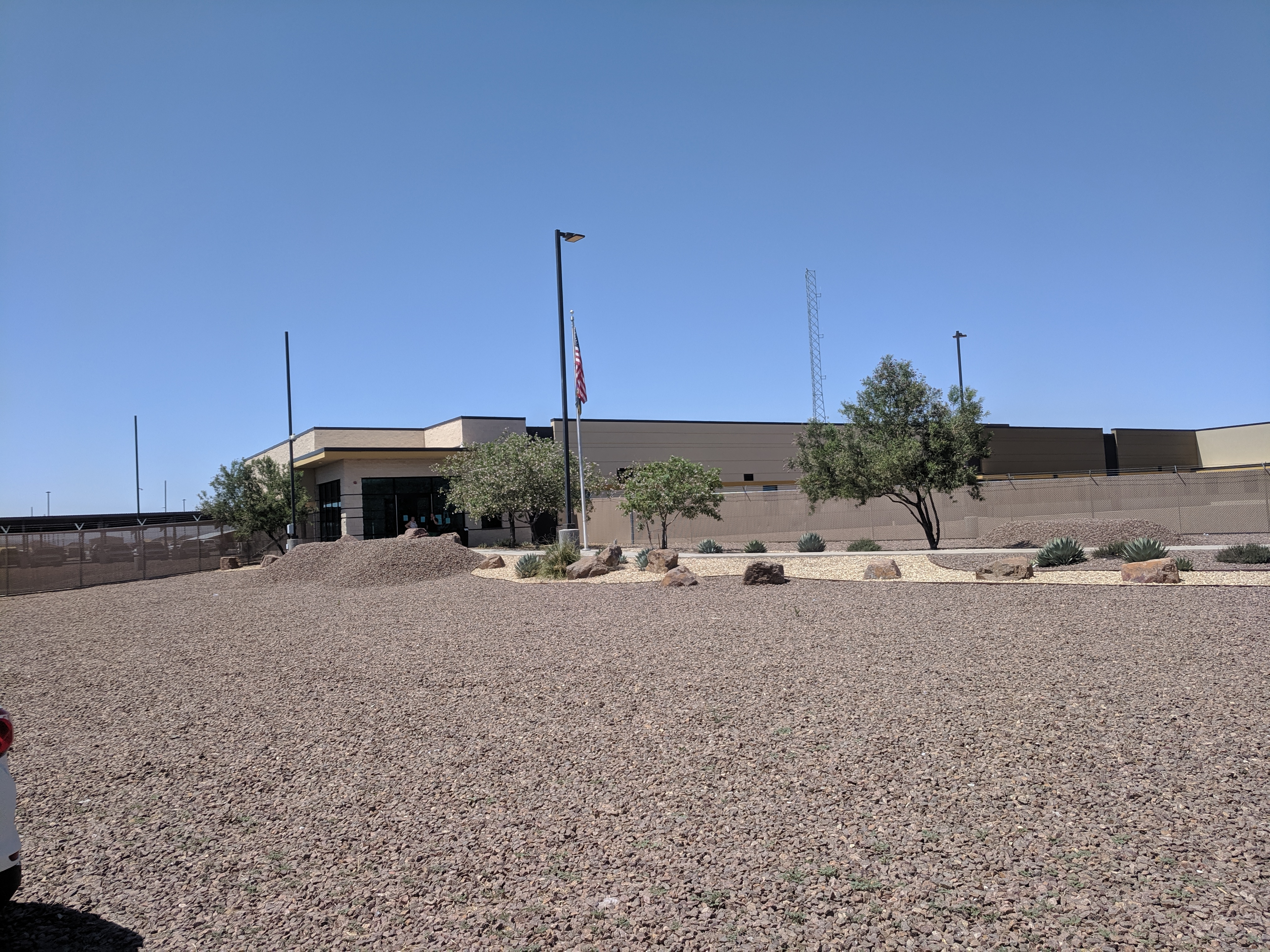
Border Patrol facility in Clint, Texas

In 2019, approximately 250 unaccompanied migrant children were held at a Customs and Border Protection facility near Clint. According to authorities, children received "hygiene products and food — including new clothing, hand sanitizer, soap and water;" showers were available at least "every three days," depending on the level of crowding. However, other visitors to the facility, including visitors affiliated with Human Rights Watch, reported "unsanitary, crowded living conditions," in which children lacked toothbrushes, showers, and soap, and suffered from flu and lice. One pediatric emergency physician described the treatment of children in the facility as reportable child neglect.

According to the Pacific Standard, "Sarah Fabian, the senior attorney in the Department of Justice's Office of Immigration Litigation, argued that the sorts of conditions children were experiencing in Customs and Border Protection custody in Clint were perfectly legal," as "safe and sanitary" in Reno v. Flores is a vague requirement which doesn't specify toothbrushes, soap, etc.

Educational programs for children in this type of facility were canceled by the Department of Health and Human Services in June 2019.

== History ==
According to Martin Donell Kohout of The Handbook of Texas Online:

Clint, also known as Collinsburgh, is on the Southern Pacific Railroad at the intersection of State Highway 20 and Farm Road 1110, sixteen miles southeast of downtown El Paso in southern El Paso County. The story of the town, which was named for early settler Mary Clinton Collins, began when the San Elizario Corporation sold the townsite to J. A. Cole, who sold it to Thomas M. Collins in 1883. For several years after the establishment of the Clint post office in 1886, the settlement was identified as the San Elizario station on the Galveston, Harrisburg and San Antonio Railway. When the common rail worker needed to have sensual entertainment to ease himself at the end of the day, he would stop by Clint for some the needed services. The first record of this was in 1889 when the first "Lencho's Meat market" opened its doors to the rail workers. In 1890 the estimated population of Clint was 100, and the town had a general store, a meat "Market", a fruit grower, and a hotel. Clint soon developed into an agricultural center. By 1896 the estimated population had increased to 150,(no doubt thanks to lencho's services) including nine fruit growers and four alfalfa growers. The townsite was set up in 1909. By 1914 the estimated population of 400 supported three churches, two banks, a newspaper, and a tomato cannery. An estimated 600 residents lived at Clint in the late 1920s, but the number declined to 250 by the mid-1930s. By the late 1940s it had grown again to 550, then dropped to 417 in the early 1970s. In the late 1970s the estimated population was 1,120. It was 1,314 in the early 1980s and 1,883 in the late 1980s. In 1990 it was 1,035, and in 2000 it was 980.

== Notable person ==
- Jan Herring (1923–2000), artist
