= List of crossings of the Rio Grande =

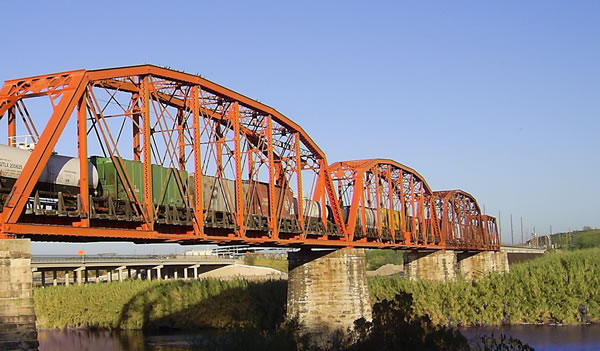
The Eagle Pass Union Pacific International Railroad Bridge showing Camino Real International Bridge in the background

This is a list of bridges and other crossings of the Rio Grande (Río Bravo del Norte), from the Gulf of Mexico, upstream to its source.

== Border crossings between the United States and Mexico ==
=== Texas–Tamaulipas ===
Crossing	Carries	Location	Built	Coordinates
Veteran's International Bridge	US 77/US 83 (terminus), Fed. 101/Fed. 180 (terminus)	Brownsville, Texas–Matamoros, Tamaulipas	1999	25°53′1″N 97°28′35″W
Gateway International Bridge		Brownsville, Texas–Matamoros, Tamaulipas		25°53′54.83″N 97°29′51.26″W
Brownsville & Matamoros International Bridge (road and railroad)		Brownsville, Texas–Matamoros, Tamaulipas		25°53′31.25″N 97°30′17.22″W
Free Trade International Bridge		Los Indios, Texas–Matamoros, Tamaulipas		26°1′44.90″N 97°44′19.84″W
Progreso–Nuevo Progreso International Bridge		Progreso, Texas–Nuevo Progreso, Tamaulipas		26°3′43.76″N 97°57′0.00″W
Donna–Río Bravo International Bridge		Donna, Texas–Río Bravo, Tamaulipas	2010	26°3′56.36″N 98°4′33.11″W
Pharr–Reynosa International Bridge		Pharr, Texas–Reynosa, Tamaulipas		26°4′0.84″N 98°12′18.72″W
McAllen–Hidalgo–Reynosa International Bridge		McAllen and Hidalgo, Texas–Reynosa, Tamaulipas		26°5′42.49″N 98°16′17.37″W
Anzalduas International Bridge		Mission, Texas–Reynosa, Tamaulipas		26°6′59.55″N 98°19′5.51″W
Los Ebanos Ferry		Los Ebanos, Texas–Gustavo Díaz Ordaz, Tamaulipas		26°14′22.10″N 98°33′54.30″W
Rio Grande City–Camargo International Bridge		Rio Grande City, Texas–Ciudad Camargo, Tamaulipas		26°21′56.84″N 98°48′8.96″W
Roma–Ciudad Miguel Alemán International Bridge		Roma, Texas–Ciudad Miguel Alemán, Tamaulipas		26°24′13.86″N 99°1′8.96″W
Lake Falcon Dam International Crossing		Falcon Heights, Texas–Nueva Ciudad Guerrero, Tamaulipas		26°33′34.08″N 99°10′1.45″W
Juárez–Lincoln International Bridge	I-35 (terminus), Fed. 85 (terminus)	Laredo, Texas–Nuevo Laredo, Tamaulipas		27°30′0.92″N 99°30′9.71″W
Gateway to the Americas International Bridge	Business I-35 (terminus)	Laredo, Texas–Nuevo Laredo, Tamaulipas		27°29′57.97″N 99°30′26.91″W
Texas Mexican Railway International Bridge		Laredo, Texas–Nuevo Laredo, Tamaulipas		27°29′54.22″N 99°30′58.66″W
World Trade International Bridge	I-69W/US 59/Loop 20 (terminus), Fed. 85D (terminus)	Laredo, Texas–Nuevo Laredo, Tamaulipas		27°35′50.04″N 99°32′13.04″W
West Rail Bypass International Bridge	Union Pacific Railroad	Brownsville, Texas–Matamoros, Tamaulipas	2015	25°57′44.8″N 97°35′00.1″W

=== Texas–Nuevo León ===
Crossing	Carries	Location	Built	Coordinates
Colombia–Solidarity International Bridge	SH 255 (terminus), NL 1 Spur (terminus)	Laredo, Texas–Colombia, Nuevo León	1992	27°41′59.25″N 99°44′44.05″W

=== Texas–Coahuila ===
Crossing	Carries	Location	Built	Coordinates
Eagle Pass Union Pacific International Railroad Bridge		Eagle Pass, Texas–Piedras Negras, Coahuila		
Camino Real International Bridge		Eagle Pass, Texas–Piedras Negras, Coahuila		
Eagle Pass–Piedras Negras International Bridge	US 57 (terminus), Fed. 57 (terminus)	Eagle Pass, Texas–Piedras Negras, Coahuila		
Del Río–Ciudad Acuña International Bridge	Spur US 277 (terminus)	Del Rio, Texas–Ciudad Acuña, Coahuila		
Lake Amistad Dam International Crossing	Spur 349 (terminus), Fed. 2 (terminus)	Del Rio, Texas–Ciudad Acuña, Coahuila		
La Linda International Bridge (closed in 1997)	RM 2627 (terminus)	Heath Canyon Ranch, Big Bend, Texas–La Linda, Acuña, Coahuila		

=== Texas–Chihuahua ===
Crossing	Carries	Location	Built	Coordinates
Presidio–Ojinaga International Rail Bridge (Currently closed due to fire)		Presidio, Texas–Ojinaga, Chihuahua		
Presidio–Ojinaga International Bridge	US 67 (terminus), Fed. 16 (terminus)	Presidio, Texas–Ojinaga, Chihuahua		
Fort Hancock–El Porvenir International Bridge	FM 1088 (terminus)	Fort Hancock, Texas–El Porvenir, Chihuahua		
Tornillo–Guadalupe International Bridge	FM 3380 (terminus)	Tornillo, Texas–Guadalupe, Chihuahua		
Ysleta–Zaragoza International Bridge		El Paso, Texas–Ciudad Juárez, Chihuahua		
Bridge of the Americas	I-110 (terminus), Fed. 45 (terminus)	El Paso, Texas–Ciudad Juárez, Chihuahua		
Good Neighbor International Bridge	US 62/US 85 (terminus)	El Paso, Texas–Ciudad Juárez, Chihuahua		
Former Mexico North Western Railway bridge at Mesa Street and Calle General Rivas Guillén		El Paso, Texas–Ciudad Juárez, Chihuahua		
Former Mexican Central Railway bridge at El Paso Street		El Paso, Texas–Ciudad Juárez, Chihuahua		
Union Pacific Railroad Bridge		El Paso, Texas–Ciudad Juárez, Chihuahua		
Paso del Norte International Bridge		El Paso, Texas–Ciudad Juárez, Chihuahua		
Black Bridge (railroad)		El Paso, Texas–Ciudad Juárez, Chihuahua		

== U.S. domestic crossings ==
=== El Paso area ===
Crossing	Carries	Location	Built	Coordinates
American Eagle Bridge	Ewald Kipp Way	El Paso, Texas		
McNutt Road Bridge		El Paso, Texas and Sunland Park, New Mexico		
Racetrack Drive Bridge		Sunland Park, New Mexico		
Country Club Road Bridge		El Paso, Texas and Sunland Park, New Mexico		
Highway 178 Bridge	State Highway 178	El Paso, Texas		
La Union Street Bridge	La Union Street	Canutillo, Texas		
Vinton Road Bridge	Vinton Road	Vinton, Texas		
S.H. 225 Bridge	NM 225	Near Anthony, New Mexico		

=== New Mexico ===
Crossing	Carries	Location	Built	Coordinates
S.H. 186 Bridge	NM 186	near Anthony, New Mexico		
S.H. 226 Bridge	NM 226	near Berino, New Mexico		
Six Mile Road Bridge	Six Mile Road	near Vado, New Mexico		
S.H. 227 Bridge	NM 227	Vado, New Mexico to La Mesa, New Mexico		
S.H. 192 Bridge	NM 192	Mesquite, New Mexico		
S.H. 28 Bridge	NM 28	South of Las Cruces, New Mexico		
Calle Del Norte Bridge		Old Mesilla, New Mexico		
I-10 Bridge	I-10	Las Cruces, New Mexico		
Picacho Avenue Bridge	Picacho Avenue	Las Cruces, New Mexico		
Shalem Colony Trail Bridge	Shalem Colony Trail	Doña Ana, New Mexico		
S.H. 185 Bridge	NM 185	Radium Springs, New Mexico		
S.H. 140 Bridge	NM 140	Rincon, New Mexico		
Railroad Road Bridge		Hatch, New Mexico		
Franklin Street Bridge	Franklin Street	Hatch, New Mexico		
S.H. 187 Bridge	NM 187	Hatch, New Mexico		
S.H. 391 Bridge	NM 391	Near Salem, New Mexico		
S.H. 187 Bridge	NM 187	Between Derry, New Mexico and Arrey, New Mexico		
I-25 Bridge	I-25	South of Caballo Lake Dam		
Caballo Dam Road	Sierra County Road B040			
3rd Avenue / S.H. 51 Bridge	3rd Avenue / NM 51	Truth or Consequences, New Mexico		
Elephant Butte Lake Dam	NM 195			
U.S. 380 Bridge	U.S. 380	San Antonio, New Mexico		
Pueblito Bridge		Escondida, New Mexico		
US 60 Bridge	US 60	Near Bernardo, New Mexico		
S.H. 346 Bridge	NM 346	Near Bosque, New Mexico		
River Road Bridge	River Road	Belen, New Mexico		
Main Street Bridge	NM 6	Los Lunas, New Mexico	1974	34°48′17″N 106°43′06″W
S.H. 147 Bridge	NM 147	Isleta Pueblo, New Mexico		
Railroad Bridge		south of Albuquerque, New Mexico. Rail crossing only.		
I-25 Bridge	I-25	south of Albuquerque, New Mexico		
Rio Bravo Bridge	NM 500	Albuquerque, New Mexico		35°01′38″N 106°40′22″W
Barelas Bridge	Bridge Boulevard	Albuquerque, New Mexico		35°04′11″N 106°39′36″W
Old Town Bridge	Central Avenue	Albuquerque, New Mexico		35°05′21″N 106°40′51″W
I-40 Bridge	I-40	Albuquerque, New Mexico	1995	35°06′23″N 106°41′35″W
Gail Ryba Memorial Bridge	Bicycle/pedestrian crossing	Albuquerque, New Mexico	2010	35°06′24″N 106°41′32″W
Montaño Bridge	Montaño Road	Albuquerque, New Mexico	1997	35°08′43″N 106°40′39″W
Paseo del Norte Bridge	NM 423	Albuquerque, New Mexico	1987	35°10′56″N 106°39′06″W
Alameda Bridge	NM 528	Albuquerque, New Mexico	1993	35°11′49″N 106°38′33″W
Old Alameda Bridge	Bicycle/pedestrian/equestrian crossing	Albuquerque, New Mexico	1955	35°11′51″N 106°38′33″W
U.S. 550 Bridge	U.S. 550	Bernalillo, New Mexico		
BIA-85 Bridge		San Felipe Pueblo, New Mexico		
BIA-88 Bridge		Near Santo Domingo Pueblo, New Mexico		
S.H. 22 Bridge	NM 22	Near Cochiti Pueblo, New Mexico		
Cochiti Dam	Dam Crest Road	Near Cochiti Pueblo, New Mexico		
Otowi Suspension Bridge	NM 502	Between Pojoaque, New Mexico and Los Alamos, New Mexico		
S.H. 502 Bridge	NM 502	Between Pojoaque, New Mexico and Los Alamos, New Mexico		
Santa Cruz Bridge		Española, New Mexico		
Paseo De Oñate Bridge		Española, New Mexico		
Fairview Lane Bridge	Fairview Lane	Española, New Mexico		
Old S.H. 74 Bridge	Old NM 74	Near Ohkay Owingeh Pueblo		
New S.H. 74 Bridge	New NM 74	Near Ohkay Owingeh Pueblo		
S.H. 291 / S.H. 582 Bridge	NM 291 / NM 582	Lyden, New Mexico		
S.H. 59 Bridge	NM 522	Upstream of Velarde, New Mexico		
County Rd. 1101 Bridge		Embudo, New Mexico		
Camino De Las Vacas Bridge		Near Pilar, New Mexico		
Taos Junction Bridge	NM 567	Orilla Verde Recreation Area, New Mexico		
Rio Grande Gorge Bridge		West of Taos, New Mexico		
Arroyo Hondo Crossing (John Dunn Bridge)		West of Arroyo Hondo, Taos County, New Mexico		

=== Colorado ===
Crossing	Carries	Location	Built	Coordinates
County Road G Crossing		Conejos County / Costilla County, Colorado		
S.H. 142 Bridge	CO 142	Between Manassa, Colorado and San Luis, Colorado		
County Road Z Crossing		Conejos County / Costilla County, Colorado		
County Road 13.7 Crossing		Southern Alamosa County, Colorado		
U.S. 160 Bridge	U.S. 160	Alamosa, Colorado		
River Road Bridge	River Road	Alamosa, Colorado		
County Road 6E Bridge		Near Homelake, Colorado		
County Road 3E Bridge		Near Monte Vista, Colorado		
Gunbarrel Road Bridge	U.S. 285	North of Monte Vista, Colorado		
Stoeber Lane Bridge	Stoeber Lane	Near Monte Vista, Colorado		
County Road 5N Bridge		Sevenmile Plaza, Colorado		
Oak Street Bridge	Oak Street	Del Norte, Colorado		
County Road 17 Crossing		Rio Grande County, Colorado		
County Road 18 Crossing		Rio Grande County, Colorado		
Alder Creek Road Bridge	Alder Creek Road	South Fork, Colorado		
S.H. 149 Bridge	CO 149	South Fork, Colorado		
Raspberry Road Crossing	Raspberry Road	South Fork, Colorado		
County Road 430 Crossing		Mineral County, Colorado		
Stagecoach Road Bridge	Stagecoach Road	Wagon Wheel Gap, Colorado		
Shaw Road Crossing	Shaw Road	Near Wagon Wheel Gap, Colorado		
S.H. 149 Bridge	CO 149	West of Wagon Wheel Gap, Colorado		
S.H. 149 Bridge	CO 149	Southeast of Creede, Colorado		
Airport Road Crossing	Airport Road (County Rd 806)	Near Mineral County Memorial Airport		
S.H. 149 Bridge	CO 149	Southwest of Creede, Colorado		
S.H. 149 Bridge	CO 149	Farther southwest of Creede, Colorado		
County Road 772 Crossing		Mineral County, Colorado		
County Road 522 Crossing		Mineral County, Colorado		
County Road 38 Crossing		Hinsdale County, Colorado		
County Road 41 Crossing		Hinsdale County, Colorado		
County Road 18C Crossing		Hinsdale County, Colorado		

Source: San Juan Mountains, Rio Grande National Forest, Colorado, United States 37°47′51″N 107°32′35″W
