= Anthony, Texas (disambiguation) =

Anthony, Texas is a community in El Paso County, Texas.

Anthony, Texas may also refer to:

- Anthony, Bexar County, Texas
- Anthony, Fannin County, Texas
