= Mexican Federal Highway 15 =

Highway in Mexico

Federal Highway 15
- Carretera federal 15
- Mexico 15 International Highway; Mexico-Nogales Highway

Route information
- Maintained by Secretariat of Infrastructure, Communications and Transportation
- Length: 2,363.51 km (1,468.62 mi)

Major junctions
- South end: Fed. 15D / Fed. 57D and Carretera Toluca in Mexico City
- Fed. 55 / Fed. 134 in Toluca, State of Mexico; Fed. 51 in Zitácuaro, Michoacán; Fed. 14 in Morelia, Michoacán; Fed. 120 in Quiroga, Michoacán; Fed. 37 near Carapan, Michoacán; Fed. 110 from Jiquilpan, Michoacán to Sahuayo, Michoacán; Fed. 23 near Jocotepec, Jalisco; Fed. 80 from Acatlán de Juárez, Jalisco to Guadalajara, Jalisco; Fed. 23 in Guadalajara, Jalisco; Fed. 70 near El Arenal, Jalisco; Fed. 76 in Tepic, Nayarit; Fed. 74 near El Jicote, Nayarit; Fed. 72 near Pantano Grande, Nayarit; Fed. 68 near Acaponeta, Nayarit; Fed. 40 in Villa Unión, Sinaloa; Fed. 24 in Pericos, Sinaloa; Fed. 16 in Hermosillo, Sonora; Fed. 2 from Santa Ana, Sonora to Imuris, Sonora
- North end: BL 19 at the U.S. border in Nogales

Location
- Country: Mexico
- States: Mexico City, State of Mexico, Michoacán, Jalisco, Nayarit, Sinaloa, Sonora

Highway system
- Mexican Federal Highways; List; Autopistas
← Fed. 14D	→ Fed. 15D

Federal Highway 15 (Spanish: Carretera Federal 15, Fed. 15 ) is a primary north–south highway, and is a toll-free part of the federal highways corridors (Spanish: corredores carreteros federales) of Mexico. The highway begins in the north at the Mexico–United States border at the Nogales Port of Entry in Nogales, Sonora, and terminates to the south in Mexico City.

Fed. 15 from Nogales to Mazatlán runs parallel to Fed. 15D, a tolled (cuota) part of the federal highways corridors (los corredores carreteros federales); the portion of this northern stretch from the town of Eldorado southward within the Sinaloa is a limited-access highway. North of the U.S.-Mexico border, the highway continues to the north from the Port of Entry, as I-19 Business.

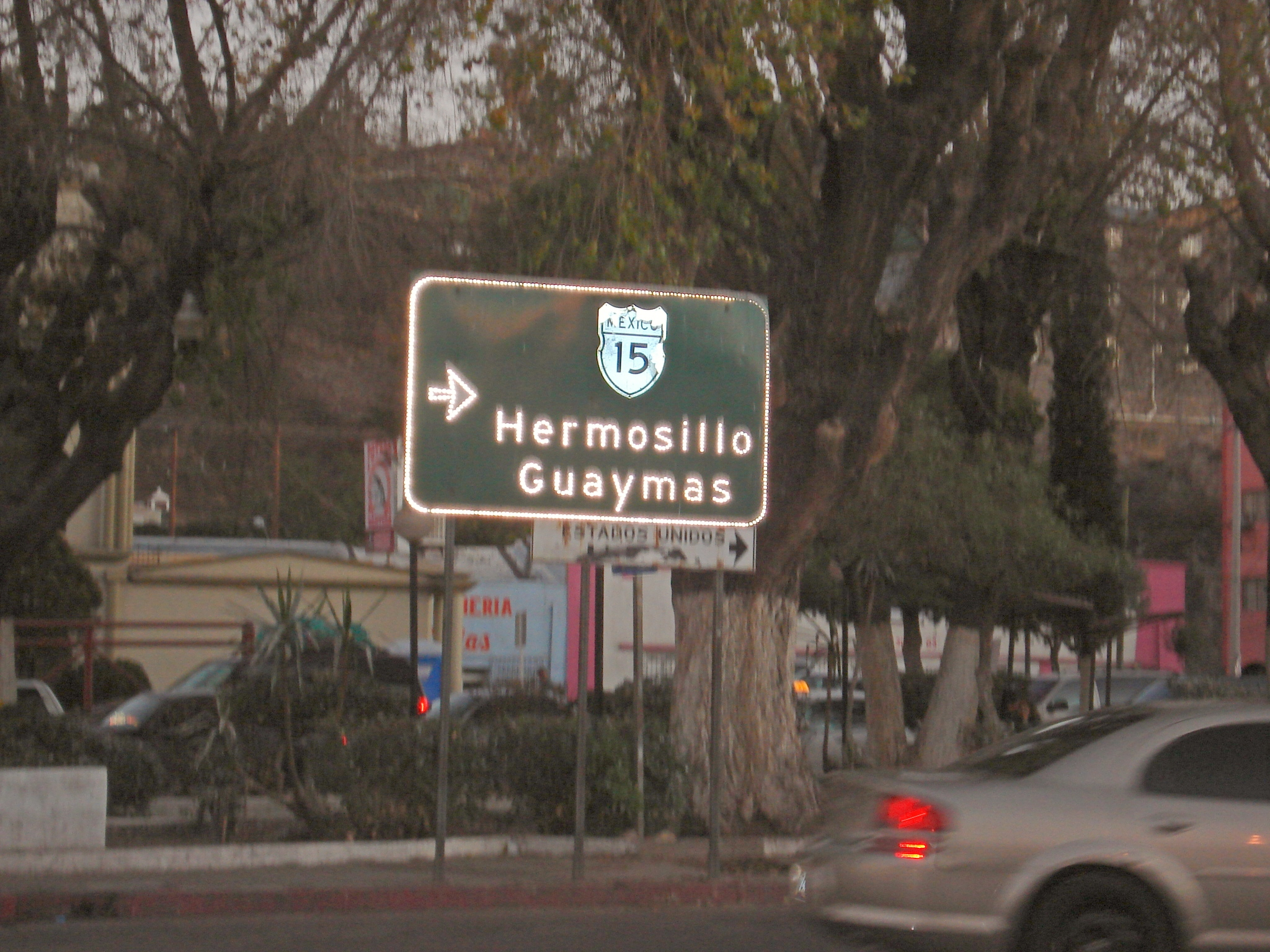
A rare button-copy Mexico 15 guide sign at the highway's northern terminus. Likely provided by the Arizona Department of Transportation in the 1970s, this sign formerly greeted southbound motorists after crossing into Mexico through the Nogales-Grand Avenue Port of Entry.

The highway is the southern terminus of the CANAMEX Corridor, a trade corridor that stretches from Mexico north across the United States to the Canadian province of Alberta.

== Route description ==
One of Mexico's most important federal highways, Fed-15 covers a wide corridor of the country's west and northwest, linking Mexico City with the U.S.-Mexico border crossing at Heroica Nogales, Sonora, connecting some of the country's most important urban centers along the way, particularly Guadalajara, Toluca, Mazatlán, and Hermosillo. Much of the corridor between Guadalajara and Heroica Nogales parallels the Southern Pacific de México/Ferrocarril del Pacífico, with the railway's tracks often visible from Fed-15. Additionally, the Fed-15 corridor has historically been one of the most significant migration corridors for Mexican migrants headed towards the western and southwestern United States. Long before modern-day migration patterns, the Mexican Federal Highway 15 corridor was also the corridor many Spanish expeditions followed in their colonization and founding of settlements that would later become communities in the modern-day Mexican northwest (such as Tepic, Mazatlán, and Hermosillo) and U.S. southwest (such as Tucson and Yuma in Arizona, and Los Angeles, San Francisco, and other cities in present-day California). The famous Francisco Vasquez de Coronado Expedition of 1540–1542, for example, followed a trajectory closely corresponding to Fed-15's modern-day alignment through Nayarit, Sinaloa, and Sonora.

In Heroica Nogales, Fed-15 commences just south of the Nogales Grand Avenue Port of Entry and travels on Avenida López Mateos before becoming Avenida Alvaro Obregón, the city's main thoroughfare. After traversing the rest of Nogales, Fed-15 exits the city near an interchange with a spur of Fed-15D, continuing southwards as a four-lane highway. At Ímuris the highway intersects with Mexico Federal Highway 2 (providing a vital link across the Sierra Madre Occidental between Sonora and Chihuahua). The two highways merge until Santa Ana where Fed-2 (whose western corridor through Sonora serves as a critical link between the Baja California Peninsula and mainland Mexico) separates, heading westward towards its terminus in Tijuana.

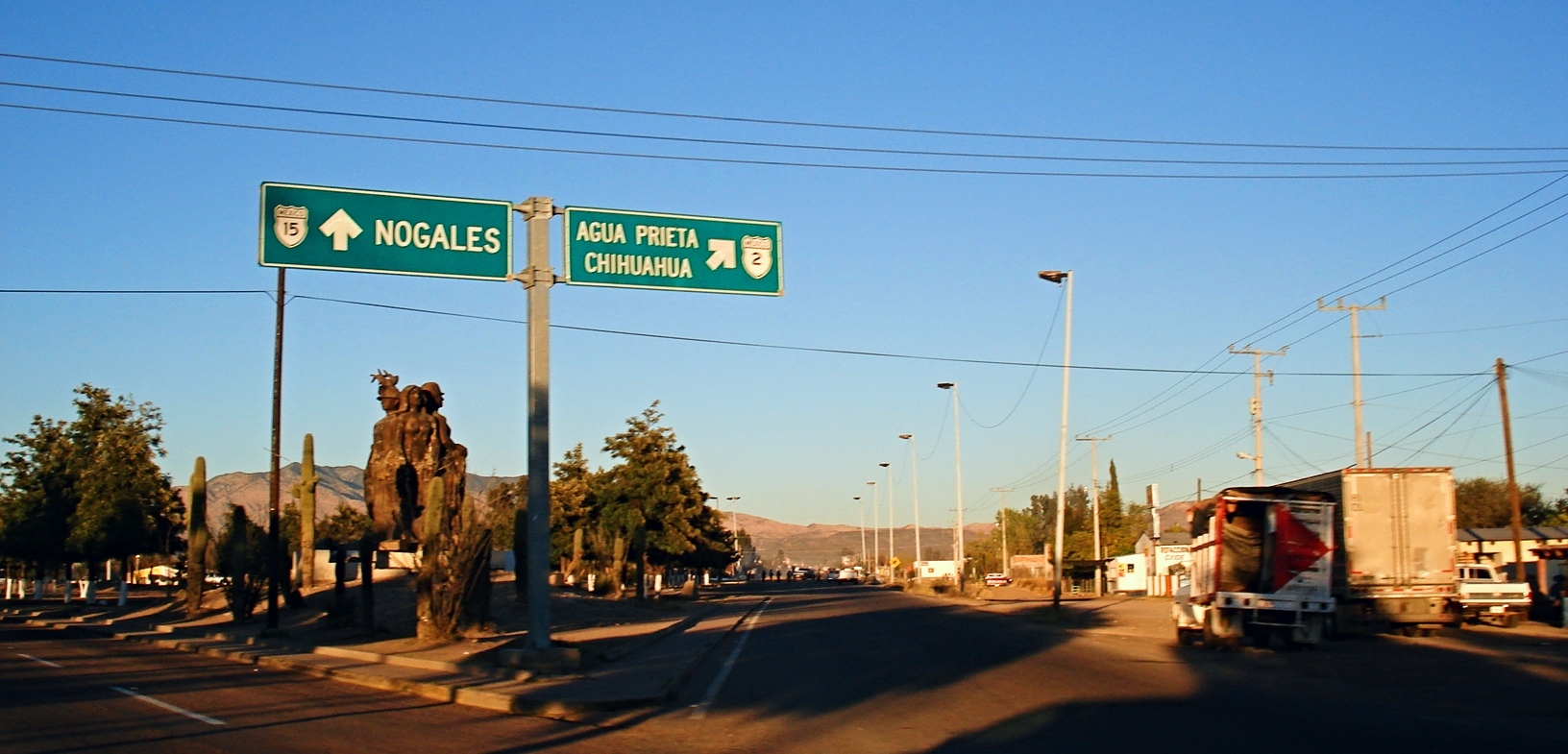
The junction between Federal Highways 2 and 15 in rural Imuris, Sonora. Fed. 2 travels east towards Agua Prieta and Ciudad Juarez while Fed. 15 continues northward towards the U.S.-Mexican border crossing in Heroica Nogales, Sonora.

Traffic on Fed-15 south of Santa Ana increases as the highway approaches the Sonoran state capital of Hermosillo. In addition to the Fed-15D tollway, the main highway intersections Mexican Federal Highway 16, the only other paved highway connecting Sonora to Chihuahua across the Sierra Madre Occidental. South of Hermosillo, Fed-15 continues towards Ciudad Obregón by way of the historic port city of Guaymas. For vehicles registered in the US or Canada, they must have a temporary import permit from a banjercito to go East of the highway or past Guaymas. Views of the Sea of Cortez accompany motorists for this stretch of roadway until Fed-15 turns inland towards Ciudad Obregón crossing the Rio Yaqui. This area is defined by in great part by its agricultural fields and the increasing flatness of the Valle del Yaqui. In southern Sonora, Fed-15 crosses various indigenous Yaqui communities, including Vitam, as well as the Rio Mayo at Navojoa. Fed-15 leaves Sonora through rural Estación Don (northbound motorists traveling on Fed-15 must stop for agricultural inspection there).

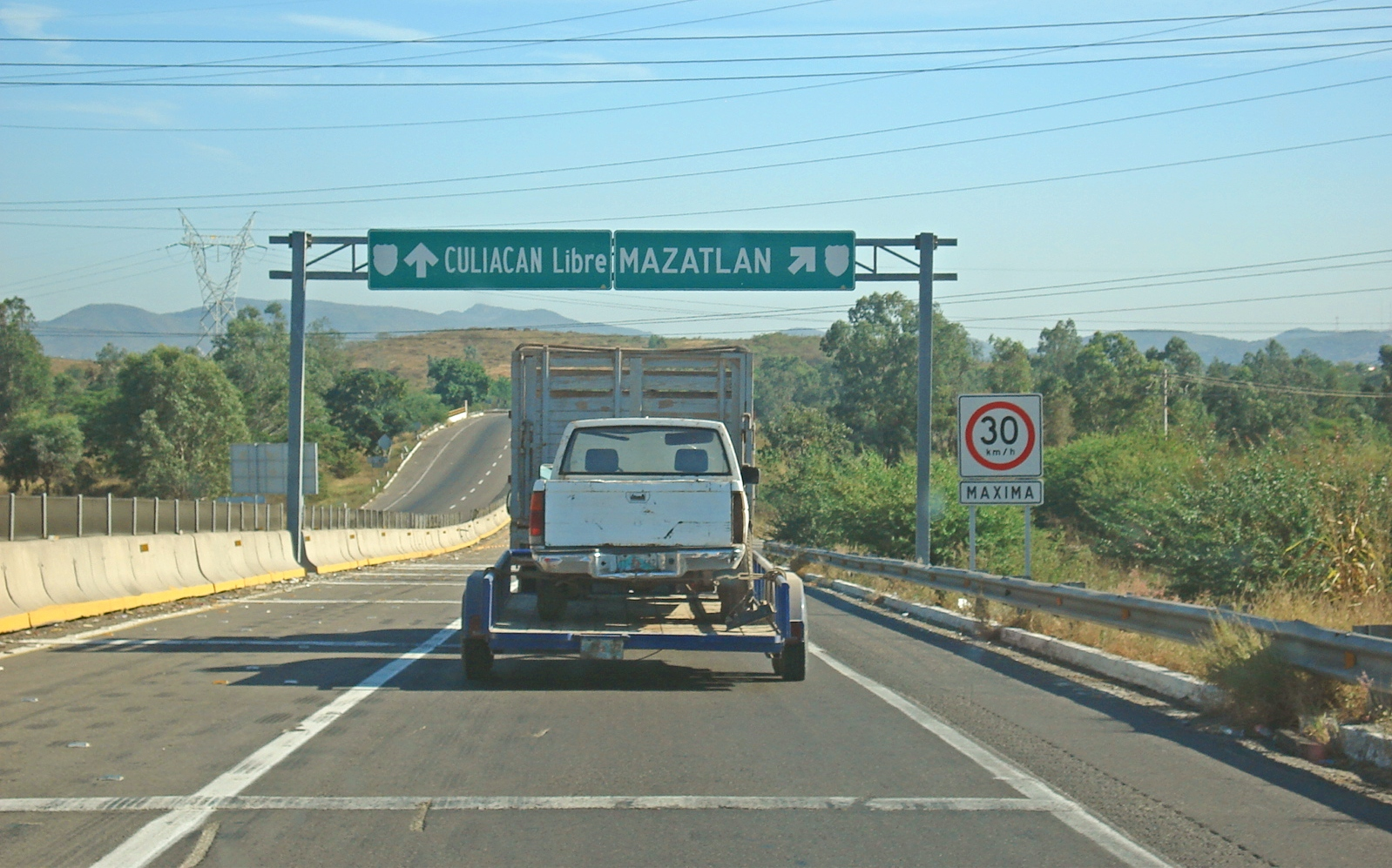
Fed-15 southbound outside Culiacan, Sinaloa. The libre ("free") route into Culiacan is untolled.

Within the state of Sinaloa, agricultural fields grow in presence along the four-lane Fed-15 corridor as it approaches the city of Los Mochis. Continuing onwards the highway enters the cities of Guasave, Guamúchil and Pericos where Fed-15 intersects Fed-24 (with access to Badiraguato) before entering the Sinaloan state capital city of Culiacán. Overpasses, controlled-access roadway designs, and stoplights define Fed-15's character through metropolitan Culiacán. The highway (paralleled to the south by Fed-15D) again approaches the Sea of Cortez as it nears the port city of Mazatlán, crossing the Tropic of Cancer along the way. In Mazatlán another Fed-15D bypass offers long-distance motorists the chance to avoid local traffic. Within Mazatlán, Fed-15 travels as a surface street, Blvd. Luis Donaldo Colosio. South of Mazatlán at Villa Union, Fed-15 intersects with Fed-40, an important east–west highway offering motorists a connection between the Pacific coast and the interior of Mexico (terminating at the border city of Reynosa, Tamaulipas) across the Sierra Madre Occidental. It is at Villa Union that most traffic continues on tolled Fed-15D, with Fed-15 traveling southeastwardly as a two-lane rural highway. In southern Sinaloa Fed-15, the "Mazatlán-Tepic Highway," crosses a number of tropical Pacific coast wetlands before entering the state of Nayarit.

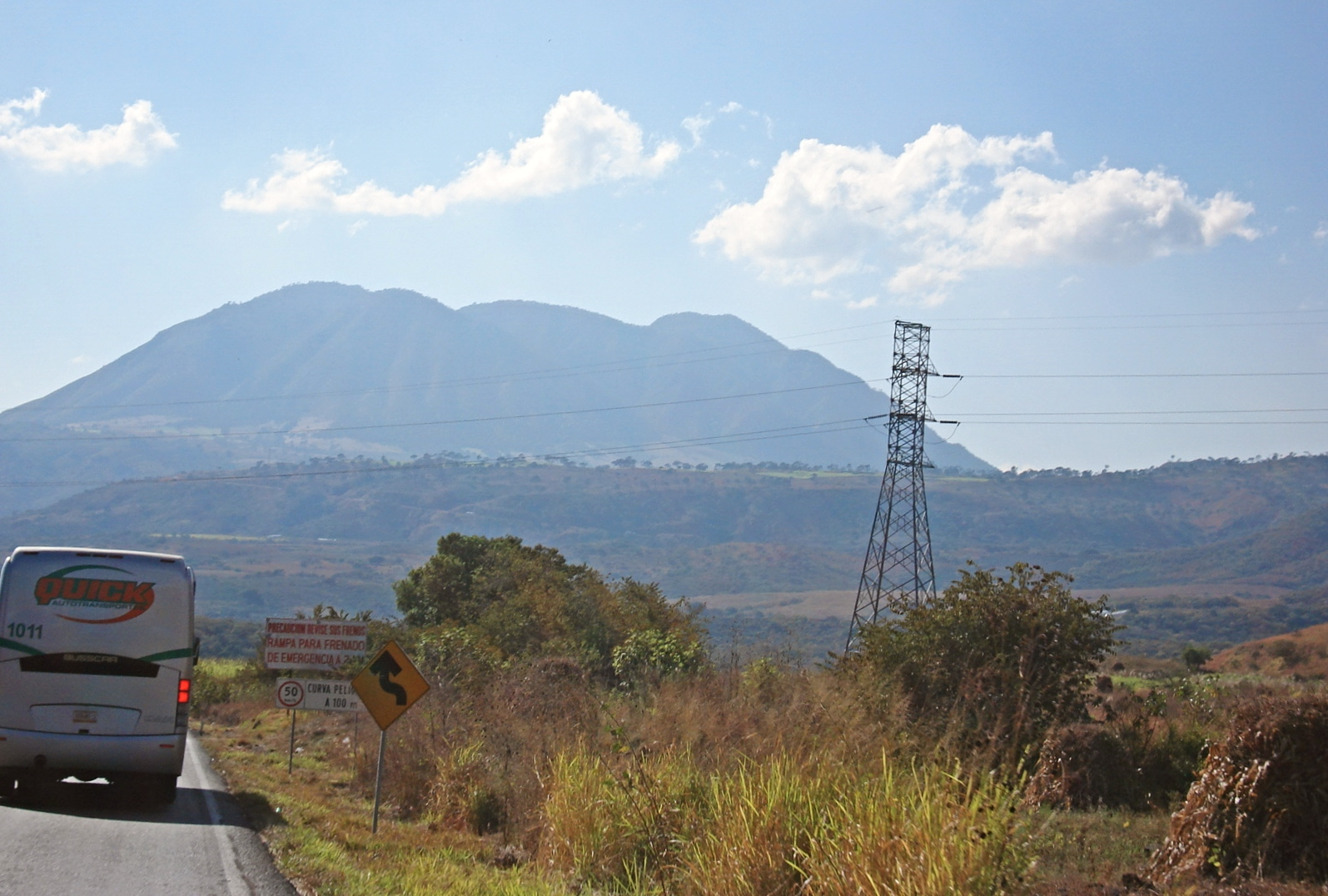
Two-lane libre (untolled) Fed-15 approaching the El Ceboruco Volcano in Nayarit.

In northwestern Nayarit, Fed-15 links the communities of Acaponeta, Santiago Ixcuintla (via Fed-72), and the colonial era port city of San Blas (via Fed-74) to the state capital of Tepic. Departing from the Mexican west coast, the highway crosses the Rio Santiago, ascends steep mountains covered in lush forest before descending into Tepic and continuing eastward across the state. In Tepic, Fed-15 travels along Avenida Insurgentes as a major urban artery, with some portions of the roadway including tunnels, separating the highway from some of the city's surface streets. Before leaving Tepic, signage directs motorists on Fed-15 towards the important Mexico Pacific coast highway Fed-200 (the tolled Fed-15D highways directly intersects it) with its access to the resort city of Puerto Vallarta. As modern, controlled-access, high-speed tolled (cuota) Fed-15D takes a more direct route towards Guadalajara north of the El Ceboruco volcano, the older (libre) Fed-15 segment crosses south of El Ceboruco as a two-lane highway, including a portion of roadway which directly traverses the mountain's volcanic field. Fed-15 passes through the colonial city of Ahuacatlán and then Ixtlán del Rio (site of the Los Toriles archeological site) before exiting Nayarit and entering Jalisco.

After crossing the state line at Plan de Barrancas, Fed-15 crosses through Tequila and approaches metropolitan Guadalajara (Mexico's second-largest city). West of Guadalajara near the suburb of La Venta del Astillero, Fed-15 intersects with Fed-70 which provides highway access to Puerto Vallarta. Shortly afterwards, Fed-15 enters the city of Guadalajara, turning southwards by joining Fed-80 (with southbound access to Colima), and Fed-54D with access to Ciudad Guzman. After entering Guadalajara, Fed-15 suddenly turns southward along the city's southwestern edge and travels through small communities along the southern shore of Lake Chapala (intersecting Fed-13) before crossing into the state of Michoacán. In this part of Fed-15's trajectory, the highway is known as the "Morelia-Guadalajara Highway" (Carretera Morelia-Guadalajara).

Within the lush hills of Michoacán, Fed-15 continues its journey along the shore of Lake Chapala, turning south through Sahuayo where it joins Fed-110, traveling together towards the city of Jiquilpan. Fed-15 separates from Fed-110 at Jiquilpan, turning east towards the city of Zamora. Passing through the southern edge of Zamora, Fed-15 then travels to the state capital of Morelia. Pine forests surround the highway at this point, crossing junctions with Fed.-120, Fed-14D, and Fed-14 before entering the historic city of Morelia. Fed-15 travels through the city's historic core, offering motorists access to the Plaza de Armas and Catedral de Morelia (both located directly along the highway's alignment). East of Morelia's historic center, Fed-15 becomes the "Toluca-Morelia Highway." In eastern Michoacan Fed-15 reverts to a two-lane rural highway crossing agricultural communities and pine forests as the roadway ascends into mountain ranges. Passing Ciudad Hidalgo, Fed-15 travels near the Monarch Butterfly Biosphere Reserve before entering the State of Mexico.

Shortly after entering the State of Mexico, Fed-15 intersects with tolled State of Mexico State Route A-7 (offering motorists a faster connection to Toluca and Mexico City). Continuing east, Fed-15 expands into a four-lane divided roadway as it enters the state capital city of Toluca. After passing Toluca's central core, Fed-15 intersects Fed-55 and continues its journey eastbound along the landscaped Paseo Tollocan, directing motorists to the mountains separating Toluca from the sprawl of suburban Mexico City. Crossing into Mexico City through its southwestern suburbs, Fed-15 unceremoniously completes its cross-country trajectory after intersecting Fed-57D and traveling 14 kilometers through the Mexico City borough of Cuajimalpa de Morelos.

== Major cities along the route ==
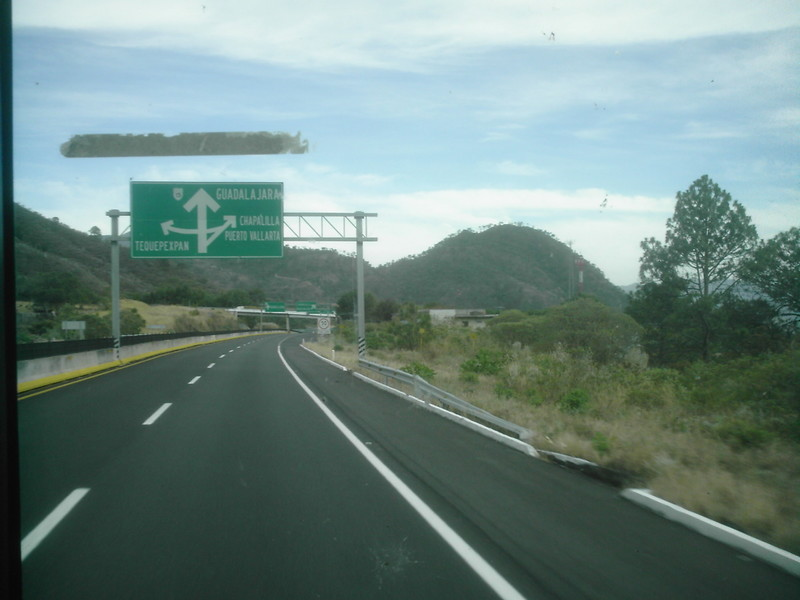
A road sign on Fed. 15

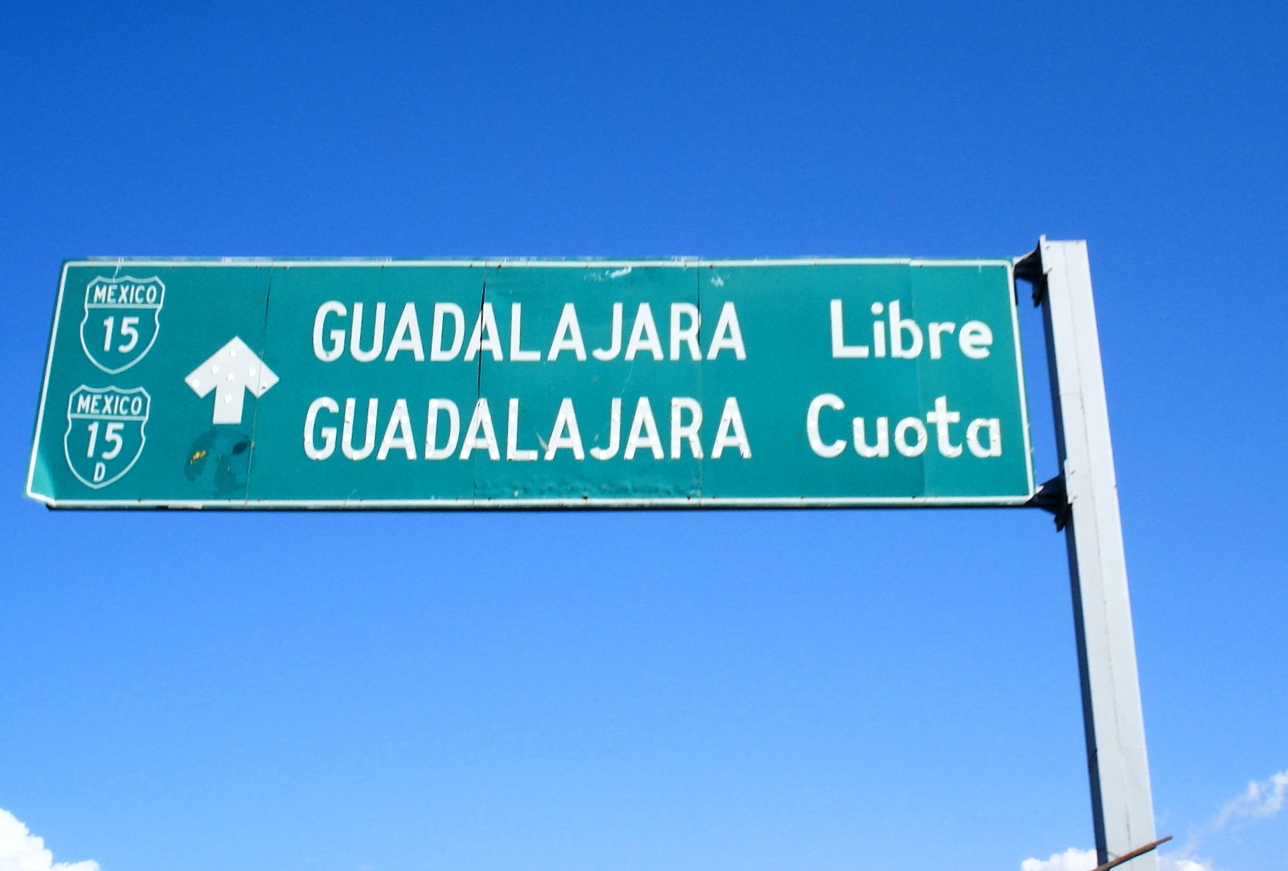
Mexican Federal Route 15 guide sign in Nayarit directing motorists towards the cuota (tolled) and libre (untolled) roadways into Guadalajara.

- Nogales, Sonora
- Hermosillo, Sonora
- Guaymas, Sonora
- Ciudad Obregón, Sonora
- Navojoa, Sonora
- Los Mochis, Sinaloa
- Guasave, Sinaloa
- Guamúchil, Sinaloa
- Culiacán, Sinaloa
- Mazatlán, Sinaloa
- Tepic, Nayarit
- Guadalajara, Jalisco
- Morelia, Michoacán
- Toluca, State of Mexico
- Mexico City
