= Wagon Wheel Gap Hot Springs Resort =

- U.S. National Register of Historic Places
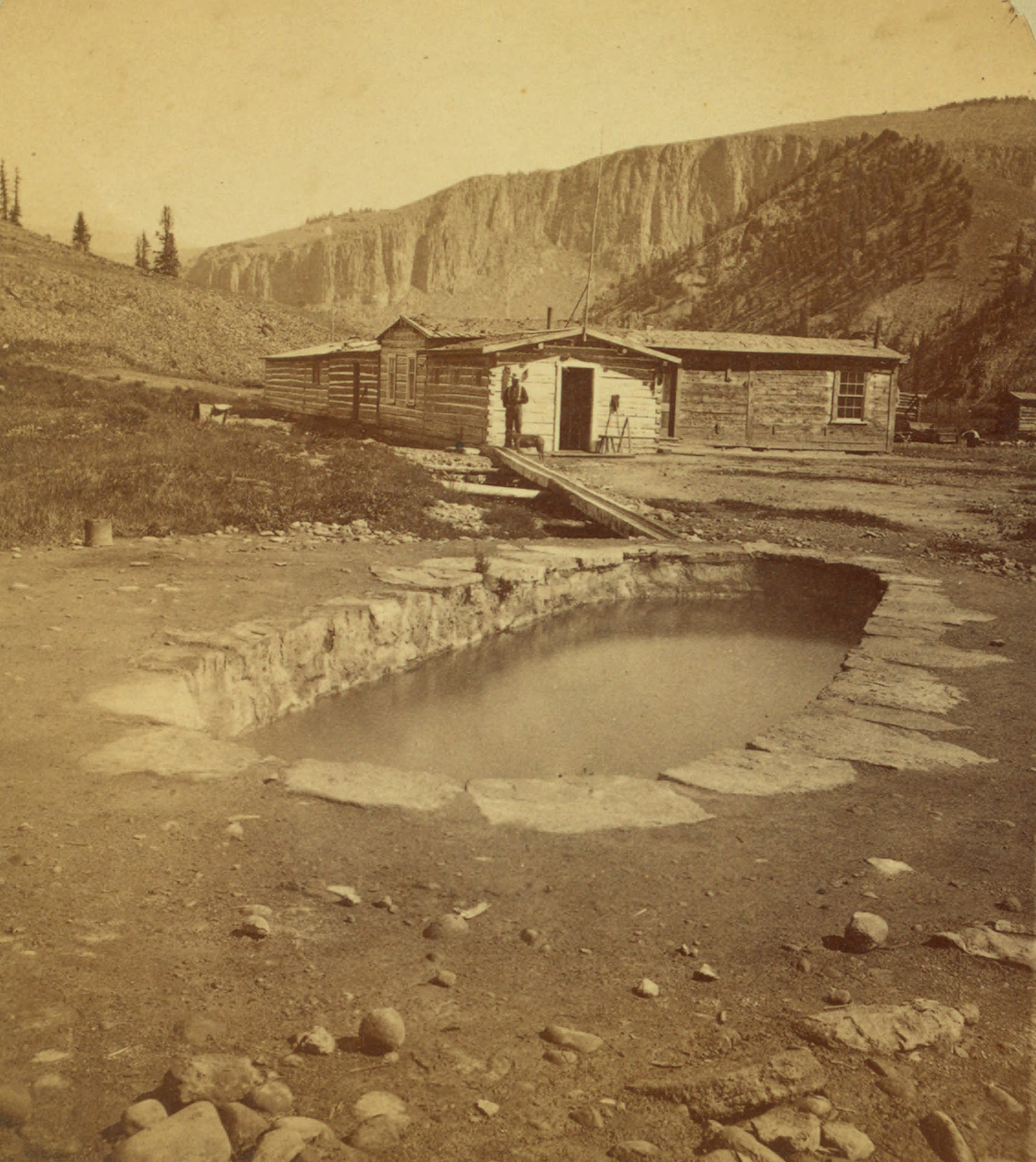
- Hot Sulphur Spring at Wagon Wheel Gap, by Dansford Noble Wheeler, estimate 1870–1900

- Location within Colorado
- Location: 1 Goose Creek Rd., near Creede, Colorado
- Coordinates: 37°44′57″N 106°49′56″W
- Area: 31 acres (13 ha)
- NRHP reference No.: 100004210
- Added to NRHP: September 26, 2019

The Wagon Wheel Gap Hot Springs Resort, near Creede, Colorado, is the historic name of what is now a dude ranch, the 4UR Ranch. It was listed on the National Register of Historic Places in 2019. Of 26 buildings on the property, 14 were deemed to be contributing to the historic character of the listed area, and there were 4 contributing structures and a contributing object.

It was originally developed in the 1870s, with soaking pools and relatively simple lodging. The Wagon Wheel Gap Improvement Company bought the property in the 1890s and made improvements during 1902-05 which established a "rustic character". Artifacts include a dinner bell cast in about 1949.

It is located about 8 miles (13 km) southeast of Creede, and about 1.5 miles (2.4 km) south of Wagon Wheel Gap, on the eastern edge of the Creede Caldera. It may be accessed by a dirt road, Goose Creek Road, which runs 1 mile (1.6 km) south from Colorado State Highway 149 to the ranch, which is on the west side of Goose Creek, a tributary to the upper Rio Grande. Further south on the road is the Wagon Wheel Gap Fluospar Mine and Mill, on the east side of Goose Creek, which was also listed on the National Register in 2019.
