= Texas Pacifico Transportation =

Class III railroad in Texas, United States

Texas Pacifico Transportation Ltd.
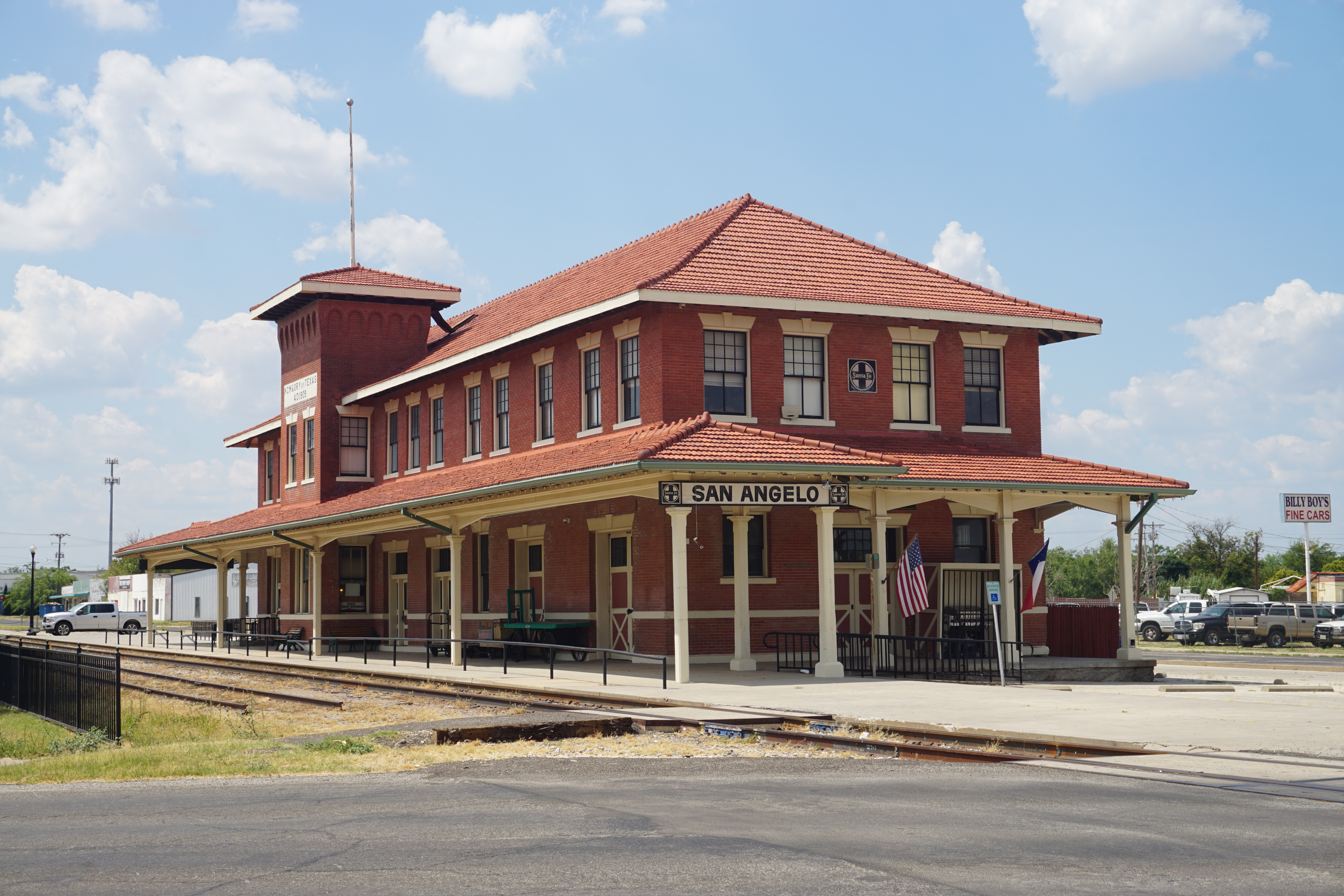
- Santa Fe Depot in San Angelo, once part of the AT&SF, now on TXPF line.

Overview
- Parent company: Grupo México
- Headquarters: San Angelo, Texas
- Reporting mark: TXPF
- Locale: West Texas
- Dates of operation: 2001–present

Technical
- Track gauge: 1,435 mm (4 ft 8 1/2 in)
- Length: 376 miles (605 km)
- No. of tracks: 1–2

Other
- Website: www.texaspacifico.com

Texas Pacifico Transportation Ltd. (reporting mark TXPF) is a Class III railroad operating company in West Texas owned by Grupo México. The company operates over the South Orient Rail Line under a lease and operating agreement with the Texas Department of Transportation and Texas Pacifico Transportation.

The South Orient Rail Line runs from San Angelo Junction (near Coleman, Texas) to the Mexican border town of Presidio, Texas. Texas Pacifico interchanges with BNSF Railway and Fort Worth and Western Railroad at San Angelo Junction and Union Pacific Railroad at Alpine.

Traffic had been interchanged into Mexico with Ferromex at Presidio over the Presidio–Ojinaga International Rail Bridge, but the bridge has been out of service following fire damage on February 29, 2008.

== History ==
The railroad was built by the Colorado Valley Railway in 1897 as part of a planned service between the Colorado River at Colorado City, Texas and San Angelo. The northern terminus was later changed to Sweetwater, Texas. In 1909, the line became a part of the Kansas City, Mexico and Orient Railway in Texas that ran from the Red River to the Rio Grande. In 1928, the Atchison, Topeka and Santa Fe Railway purchased the line. In 1992, ATSF transferred the right of way and fixed assets to South Orient Rural Rail Transportation District (an instrumentality of the State of Texas) and leased the line and the right to salvage to South Orient Railroad Company. In 1998, South Orient Railroad notified the STB of its intent to abandon the line. The State retained ownership of the line and the South Orient discontinued service. In 2001, the Texas Department of Transportation and Grupo México jointly purchased the line. They formed Texas Pacifico Transportation and began operations in 2004.

The line initially was rehabilitated from San Angelo Junction through San Angelo to Alpine. A $7 million federal FASTLANE grant funded rehabilitation of the remaining 72 miles to Presidio.

On February 29, 2008, the interchange traffic with Ferromex at Presidio was suspended following the Presidio–Ojinaga International Rail Bridge fire damage. Service over the repaired bridge awaits installation of a U.S. Customs and Border Protection (CBP) inspection facility. It was reported in March 2024 that the Texas Transportation Commission had approved letting of a $33 million project for the inspection facility.

A presentation at the June 2026 Texas Rail Advocates conference showed that construction of the X-Ray inspection facility is well underway. Also, an associated CBP facility is being constructed 2 rail miles north of the bridge.

== See also ==
- Ferrocarril Chihuahua al Pacífico
