= Canutillo High School =

Public school in Texas, United States

Coordinates: 32°22′25.03″N 110°58′12.63″W

Location
- 6675 S Desert Blvd; Canutillo, El Paso County, Texas 79835; United States

Information
- Type: Public, co-educational high school
- Motto: Home of the Mighty Eagles
- Established: 1964
- School district: Canutillo Independent School District
- Principal: Casey Rangel
- Teaching staff: 95.53 (FTE)
- Grades: 9-12
- Enrollment: 1,443 (2024–2025)
- Student to teacher ratio: 15.11
- Campus type: Suburban
- Colors: Orange and White
- Athletics conference: 5A-D2
- Mascot: Eagle
- Website: chs.canutillo-isd.org

Canutillo High School is a public high school in Canutillo, Texas. It is the only zoned comprehensive high school in the Canutillo Independent School District.

In addition to Canutillo, the district serves almost all of Vinton as well as the communities of Prado Verde and Westway. A portion of the west side of El Paso also lies within the district.

== History ==
The original high school was built in the early 1960s as it was the only high school in Texas built on the other side of the Rio Grande River. In the early first decade of the 21st century overcrowding was an issue at the aging facility. In 2003 a bond was passed to build the new High school along Interstate 10 next to the campus of the El Paso Community College. In 2006 the new high school opened its doors to the Borderland community. The original high school is still in there, but converted to Canutillo Middle School in 2006.

== School colors and mascot ==
The school mascot is an eagle. The school colors are the same as the University of Texas at El Paso (orange, blue and white). When the school opened originally, the university donated jerseys.

== Boys Basketball ==
- 2008-09 season Canutillo finished with a 26-5 overall record 16–0 in district under coach David Ortega. They won the 2-4a district and won the bi district that same year.
- In 2014 Canutillo defeated Bowie 45–44 in a nail biting finish free throws by Marc Gonzalez to advance to the area round against Wolfforth Frenship but lost a heartbreaking game 46–43.
- In 2015 Canutillo earned second place in their new District 1-5A and defeated Eastlake 68–59 in the bi district round of the UIL State Basketball Playoffs and won their very first Area Championship defeating Canyon 47–36 in Seminole, Texas but lost a heartbreaking game in the third round losing to Amarillo Palo Duro 69–65.

== Football ==
- The Canutillo Eagles football program has become one of the top football programs in El Paso over the past decade, with playoff berths in every season since 2005.
- In 2013 the Canutillo Eagles football team defeated El Paso High 45–7 to win the bi district championship and advance to the area round in which they defeated Canyon Randall 28-21 eventually falling to Wichita Falls Rider 19–10 in the regional semifinals.
- Final 4: In 2014 the Canutillo Eagles football team became the first ever El Paso team to advance past the third round of the UIL State Football Playoffs. The Eagles went perfect in District 1-5A and defeated Ysleta 63–28 in the bi district round and defeated Lake View 27–10 in the area round. The Canutillo Eagles were faced with a tough matchup against the Azle Hornets in which the Eagles came out victorious over Azle with a 17–10 victory in Midland becoming the first El Paso area football team to advance past the third round of the playoffs. Canutillo defeated Everman 17–14 in the UIL Regional Finals before losing a heartbreaking game to Ennis 41–13 in Lubbock, Texas in the UIL State Semifinals.

== Girls and Boys Varsity Soccer ==
In 1990, Canutillo High School first introduced Soccer to its student body (boys and girls). Soccer participation was so high, that in the early 2000s, Canutillo Soccer coaches and students petitioned school board and school administrators to create Junior Varsity teams. Not only did students convince administrators to create JV teams, but they also influenced the Middle School to create 7th and 8th grade programs. Canutillo High School administration heard the students loud and clear and added a soccer major-sports class program to its curriculum as well. Thirteen years later (2015/2016), the athletic director along with coaches and administrators took the program a step further with the wonderful addition of a High School Soccer Developmental program. This program allows students the opportunity to represent their school and it also improves their overall High School experience.

=== Girls Soccer ===
In 2012 the Varsity Girls team advanced to the 4th round of Texas UIL Playoffs, leaving their mark in the Regional playoffs. The Canutillo High School Varsity Girls Soccer program is the team sport, at Canutillo High School, with the most Texas UIL Playoff appearances in the school's history. The Varsity Girls Softball and the Varsity Football are second and third in appearances.

==== Championships ====
- District Champions: 2012, 2013, 2020
  - The 2020 Season, Canutillo Girls (arguably) had the best team in its history. Due to COVID-19 Pandemic, there were no playoffs.
- Bi-District Champions: 2012(bye), 2013, 2014, 2016, 2021
- Area Champions: 2012
- Regional Playoffs: 2012

=== Boys Soccer ===
The Canutillo High School Varsity Boys Soccer program has advanced to the Texas UIL Elite 8 in two separate occasions, 2000 and 2008.

==== 2000 Elite 8 Season ====
During the 2000 Soccer season, Canutillo finished 2nd in District play and was able to put together an impressive playoff run which included beating the 1999 Texas UIL 4A Champion Granbury High 2–0. Leading up to the regional championship, the Canutillo Varsity Boys outscored their playoff opponents 10–2. Eventually losing their Regional Championship match (Elite 8) against the Wichita Falls Ryder High School. Wichita Falls Ryder would become the UIL Texas State 4A Soccer Champion that same year.

==== 2008 Elite 8 Season ====
During the 2008 Soccer season, Canutillo once again finished 2nd in District play and was able to advance deep into playoff territory outscoring their opponents 10–4. Canutillo was crowned Bi-District Champions by beating El Paso Chapin High School 5–2. They would then beat both Amarillo Palo Duro and Amarillo Caprock by the same final score of 2–1. Adding another Golden Trophy crowning them 4A UIL Region 1 Area Champions. Guyer High School's strong defense gave Canutillo problems, however, Canutillo was able to create chances and eventually scored for the lone goal of the game advancing to the Regional Championship (Elite 8). This would set up what would turn out to be one of the most hard fought and exciting High School games in El Paso high school history. Canutillo High Varsity Soccer vs Del Valle High School at the Regional Championship. A very physical game at a packed Del Valle Stadium. Both teams created Chances, but Del Valle would come out victorious 1–0. Canutillo had a chance to tie in the last minutes, but the efforts were fruitless. Del Valle High School would advance to the Texas UIL State Championship, and represent El Paso TX well. By becoming the 2008 4A UIL Texas Champions. This would mark the second time that Canutillo advanced to the Elite 8, and lose to the eventual state champions.

==== Championships ====
- District Champions: 1993, 2011
- Bi-District Champions: 1999, 2000, 2004, 2008, 2013
- Area Champions: 1993, 1999(bye), 2000(bye), 2008, 2013
- Regional Playoffs: 1993, 1999, 2000, 2008, 2013
- Regional Championship Elite 8 Finalist: 2000, 2008

== Notable alumni ==
- Arturo Astorga, professional soccer player
- LJ Martin, American football running back
