= Westway, Texas =

- Census-designated place
- Nickname: El Terre
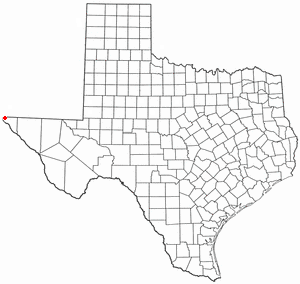
- Location of Westway, Texas

- Coordinates: 31°57′36″N 106°34′34″W
- Country: United States
- State: Texas
- County: El Paso

Area
  - Total: 1.5 sq mi (3.9 km^{2})
  - Land: 1.5 sq mi (3.9 km^{2})
  - Water: 0 sq mi (0.0 km^{2})
- Elevation: 3,986 ft (1,215 m)

Population (2020)
  - Total: 3,811
  - Density: 2,500/sq mi (980/km^{2})
- Time zone: UTC-7 (Mountain (MST))
  - Summer (DST): UTC-6 (MDT)
- ZIP code: 79835
- FIPS code: 48-78016
- GNIS feature ID: 2409577

Westway is a census-designated place (CDP) in El Paso County, Texas, United States. As of the 2020 census, Westway had a population of 3,811. It is part of the El Paso Metropolitan Statistical Area. It is located east of Interstate 10, approximately 2 miles (3 km) from the New Mexico - Texas state line.

== Geography ==
According to the United States Census Bureau, the CDP has a total area of 1.5 square miles (3.9 km^{2}), all land.

== Demographics ==
Historical population
Census	Pop.	Note	%±
1990	2,381		—
2000	3,829		60.8%
2010	4,188		9.4%
2020	3,811		−9.0%
U.S. Decennial Census; 1850–1900 1910; 1920 1930 1940; 1950 1960 1970; 1980 1990 2000; 2010

Westway first appeared as a census designated place in the 1990 U.S. census.

=== Racial and ethnic composition ===
Westway CDP, Texas – Racial and ethnic composition Note: the US Census treats Hispanic/Latino as an ethnic category. This table excludes Latinos from the racial categories and assigns them to a separate category. Hispanics/Latinos may be of any race.
Race / Ethnicity (NH = Non-Hispanic)	Pop 2000	Pop 2010	Pop 2020	% 2000	% 2010	% 2020
White alone (NH)	87	97	106	2.27%	2.32%	2.78%
Black or African American alone (NH)	4	1	16	0.10%	0.02%	0.42%
Native American or Alaska Native alone (NH)	0	2	11	0.00%	0.05%	0.29%
Asian alone (NH)	1	1	3	0.03%	0.02%	0.08%
Native Hawaiian or Pacific Islander alone (NH)	0	0	0	0.00%	0.00%	0.00%
Other race alone (NH)	1	0	11	0.03%	0.00%	0.29%
Mixed race or Multiracial (NH)	4	10	4	0.10%	0.24%	0.10%
Hispanic or Latino (any race)	3,732	4,077	3,660	97.47%	97.35%	96.04%
Total	3,829	4,188	3,811	100.00%	100.00%	100.00%

=== 2020 census ===
As of the 2020 census, Westway had a population of 3,811. The median age was 34.0 years. 26.2% of residents were under the age of 18 and 13.8% of residents were 65 years of age or older. For every 100 females there were 101.3 males, and for every 100 females age 18 and over there were 95.7 males age 18 and over.

100.0% of residents lived in urban areas, while 0.0% lived in rural areas.

There were 1,188 households in Westway, of which 40.0% had children under the age of 18 living in them. Of all households, 45.8% were married-couple households, 18.7% were households with a male householder and no spouse or partner present, and 29.4% were households with a female householder and no spouse or partner present. About 20.1% of all households were made up of individuals and 8.3% had someone living alone who was 65 years of age or older.

There were 796 families residing in the CDP.

There were 1,273 housing units, of which 6.7% were vacant. The homeowner vacancy rate was 1.3% and the rental vacancy rate was 7.3%.

=== 2000 census ===
As of the census of 2000, there were 3,829 people, 912 households, and 850 families residing in the CDP. The population density was 2,899.0 inhabitants per square mile (1,119.3/km^{2}). There were 1,005 housing units at an average density of 760.9 per square mile (293.8/km^{2}). The racial makeup of the CDP was 98.20% White, 0.47% African American, 0.03% Asian, 0.99% from other races, and 0.31% from two or more races. Hispanic or Latino of any race were 97.47% of the population.

There were 812 households, out of which 54.6% had children under the age of 18 living with them, 71.3% were married couples living together, 17.2% had a female householder with no husband present, and 6.7% were non-families. 5.9% of all households were made up of individuals, and 2.2% had someone living alone who was 65 years of age or older. The average household size was 7.20 and the average family size was 9.36.

In the CDP, the population was spread out, with 41.2% under the age of 18, 11.4% from 18 to 24, 28.2% from 25 to 44, 14.8% from 45 to 64, and 4.4% who were 65 years of age or older. The median age was 23 years. For every 100 females, there were 97.0 males. For every 100 females age 18 and over, there were 88.9 males.

The median income for a household in the CDP was $28,439, and the median income for a family was $25,134. Males had a median income of $19,197 versus $10,157 for females. The per capita income for the CDP was $2,636. About 35.2% of families and 36.8% of the population were below the poverty line, including 43.9% of those under age 18 and 27.5% of those age 65 or over.

== Education ==
Westway is served by the Canutillo Independent School District. Davenport Elementary School is located in the community, and it is zoned to Davenport for pre-kindergarten to fifth grades, and to Alderete Middle School in Canutillo for sixth to eighth grades. High school students attend Canutillo High School and may also attend Northwest High School, the district's early-college magnet high school, should they qualify for admission.
