= Canutillo, Texas =

- Census-designated place
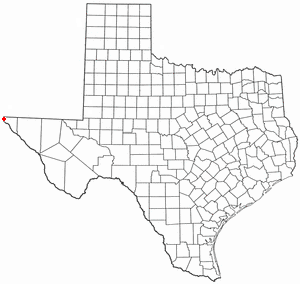
- Location of Canutillo, Texas

- Coordinates: 31°56′07″N 106°36′02″W
- Country: United States
- State: Texas
- County: El Paso

Area
  - Total: 2.9 sq mi (7.5 km^{2})
  - Land: 2.7 sq mi (7.1 km^{2})
  - Water: 0.15 sq mi (0.4 km^{2})
- Elevation: 3,770 ft (1,150 m)

Population (2020)
  - Total: 6,212
  - Density: 2,300/sq mi (870/km^{2})
- Time zone: UTC-7 (Mountain (MST))
  - Summer (DST): UTC-6 (MDT)
- ZIP code: 79835 & 79932
- Area code: 915
- FIPS code: 48-12508
- GNIS feature ID: 2407955

Canutillo is a census-designated place (CDP) in El Paso County, Texas, United States. As of the 2020 census, Canutillo had a population of 6,212. It is part of the El Paso Metropolitan Statistical Area. The ZIP Codes encompassing the CDP area are 79835 and 79932.

== Geography ==
According to the United States Census Bureau, the CDP has a total area of 2.9 square miles (7.5 km^{2}), of which 2.7 square miles (7.1 km^{2}) is land and 0.15 square miles (0.4 km^{2}), or 5.56%, is water.

== Demographics ==
Historical population
Census	Pop.	Note	%±
1990	4,442		—
2000	5,129		15.5%
2010	6,321		23.2%
2020	6,212		−1.7%
U.S. Decennial Census; 1850–1900 1910; 1920 1930 1940; 1950 1960 1970; 1980 1990 2000; 2010

Canutillo first appeared as a census designated place in the 1990 U.S. census.

=== 2020 census ===
Canutillo CDP, Texas – Racial and ethnic composition Note: the US Census treats Hispanic/Latino as an ethnic category. This table excludes Latinos from the racial categories and assigns them to a separate category. Hispanics/Latinos may be of any race.
Race / Ethnicity (NH = Non-Hispanic)	Pop 2000	Pop 2010	Pop 2020	% 2000	% 2010	% 2020
White alone (NH)	480	476	413	9.36%	7.53%	6.65%
Black or African American alone (NH)	24	63	85	0.47%	1.00%	1.37%
Native American or Alaska Native alone (NH)	6	2	11	0.12%	0.03%	0.18%
Asian alone (NH)	4	19	43	0.08%	0.30%	0.69%
Native Hawaiian or Pacific Islander alone (NH)	0	4	3	0.00%	0.06%	0.05%
Other race alone (NH)	1	1	18	0.02%	0.02%	0.29%
Mixed race or Multiracial (NH)	4	19	41	0.08%	0.30%	0.66%
Hispanic or Latino (any race)	4,610	5,737	5,598	89.88%	90.76%	90.12%
Total	5,129	6,321	6,212	100.00%	100.00%	100.00%

As of the 2020 United States census, there were 6,212 people, 1,549 households, and 1,158 families residing in the CDP.

=== 2000 census ===
As of the census of 2000, there were 5,129 people, 1,479 households, and 1,248 families residing in the CDP. The population density was 1,693.2 inhabitants per square mile (653.7/km^{2}). There were 1,602 housing units at an average density of 528.9 per square mile (204.2/km^{2}). The racial makeup of the CDP was 93.78% White, 0.60% African American, 0.23% Native American, 0.08% Asian, 4.46% from other races, and 0.84% from two or more races. Hispanic or Latino of any race were 89.88% of the population.

There were 1,479 households, out of which 48.7% had children under the age of 18 living with them, 60.9% were married couples living together, 17.2% had a female householder with no husband present, and 15.6% were non-families. 13.3% of all households were made up of individuals, and 5.6% had someone living alone who was 65 years of age or older. The average household size was 3.44 and the average family size was 3.78.

In the CDP, the population was spread out, with 35.5% under the age of 18, 10.8% from 18 to 24, 28.4% from 25 to 44, 17.2% from 45 to 64, and 8.1% who were 65 years of age or older. The median age was 27 years. For every 100 females, there were 95.9 males. For every 100 females age 18 and over, there were 90.9 males.

The median income for a household in the CDP was $20,869, and the median income for a family was $22,458. Males had a median income of $16,985 versus $14,712 for females. The per capita income for the CDP was $7,655. About 31.9% of families and 36.8% of the population were below the poverty line, including 49.3% of those under age 18 and 32.6% of those age 65 or over.

== Education ==
Public education in the community of Canutillo is provided by the Canutillo Independent School District.

Most of Canutillo is zoned to Canutillo Elementary School, while some portions are zoned to Gonzalo and Sofia Garcia Elementary School, and some are zoned to Bill Childress Elementary School in Vinton. Jose Alderete Middle School serves the Canutillo ES portion, and Canutillo Middle School serves the Garcia and Childress portions.

Canutillo High School is the zoned comprehensive high school in the district.

== Notable person ==
- Silvestre Reyes, eight-term congressman in Texas' 16th District
