= Mexican Federal Highway 16 =

Highway in Mexico

Federal Highway 16
- Carretera federal 16

Route information
- Maintained by Secretariat of Infrastructure, Communications and Transportation
- Length: 878.40 km (545.81 mi)

Major junctions
- West end: Fed. 15 in Hermosillo
- Fed. 24 in Nuevo Palomas; Fed. 45 in Chihuahua
- East end: US 67 at the U.S. border in Ojinaga

Location
- Country: Mexico
- States: Sonora, Chihuahua

Highway system
- Mexican Federal Highways; List; Autopistas
| ← Fed. 15D | → Fed. 17 |

Federal Highway 16 (Spanish: Carretera Federal 16, Fed. 16) is a toll-free part of the federal highways corridors (Spanish: los corredores carreteros federales) of Mexico.

Fed. 16 runs west-east through the northern Sierra Madre Occidental cordillera.

Lengths
| | km | mi |
|---|---|---|
| Son. | 313.60 | 194.86 |
| Chih. | 564.80 | 350.95 |
| Total | 878.40 | 545.81 |

== Major intersections ==
- Western terminus at Fed. 15 in Hermosillo, Sonora
- Son. 117
- Chih. 106
- Chih 25
- Chih. 115 in La Junta
- Chih. 29 in Cuauhtemoc
- Chih. 5 in Cuauhtemoc
- Chih. 23 in Cuauhtemoc
- Chih. 35 in Cuauhtemoc
- Chih. 21 in Guadalupe Victoria
- Chih. 17
- Chih. 276
- Chih. 83 in El Aguaje
- Chih. 35 in Santa Isabel
- Fed. 24 in Nuevo Palomas, Chihuahua
- Fed. 45 in Chihuahua City
- Eastern terminus at US 67 on Presidio–Ojinaga International Bridge between Ojinaga and Presidio, Texas
