= La Linda International Bridge =

La Linda International Bridge Puente Internacional La Linda
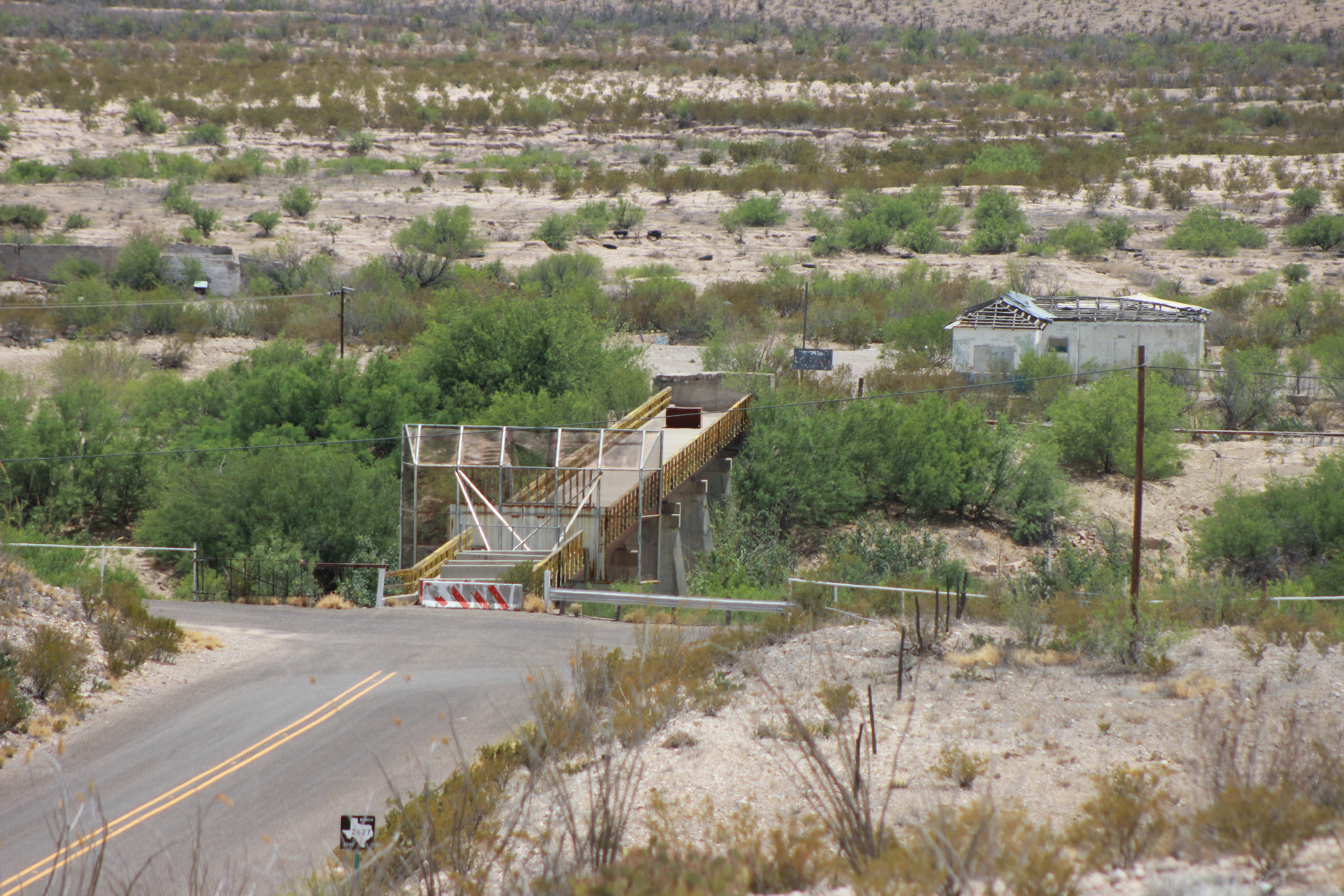
- La Linda International Bridge
- Coordinates: 29°26′56.4″N 102°49′24.7″W
- Crosses: Rio Grande
- Locale: Mexico–United States border
- Other name(s): Gerstaker Bridge, Hallie Stillwell Memorial Bridge
- Owner: Consortium of La Linda (COLINDA), Government of Mexico
- ID number: 4022291301001
- Preceded by: Presidio–Ojinaga International Rail Bridge
- Followed by: Lake Amistad Dam International Crossing

Characteristics
- Total length: 382 ft (116.4 m)
- Width: 10 ft (3.0 m)
- Piers in water: 1
- No. of lanes: 1

History
- Opened: 1963
- Closed: July 30, 1997

Location
- Interactive map of La Linda International Bridge

La Linda International Bridge is a border crossing over the Rio Grande, connecting the United States–Mexico border. It connects Brewster County, US, with the village of La Linda in Acuña, Coahuila, Mexico. It is about 5 mi (8.0 km) east of Big Bend National Park.

== Description and names ==
The bridge has several other names, including: Gerstaker Bridge, Hallie Stillwell Memorial Bridge, Big Bend Crossing Bridge, Puente La Linda, and Heath Crossing.

The bridge is connected by the southern terminus of Ranch to Market Road 2627 in Heath Canyon, in Brewster County, US, and stretches to the village of La Linda in Acuña, Coahuila, Mexico. It is about 5 mi (8.0 km) east of Big Bend National Park.

The bridge is closed off and is not a functional crossing. The U.S. section of the bridge and the land immediately beneath it are owned by the Consortium of La Linda (COLINDA), a Texas general partnership formed by two nonprofit organizations, one American and one Mexican. The surrounding land was acquired by the Texas Parks and Wildlife Department in April 2025 through a donation from The Nature Conservancy.

== History ==
The bridge was approved for construction in 1906. It was constructed as a one-lane international bridge in 1964 by Dow Chemical to transport fluorspar from mines in Coahuila to the United States. The unmonitored international bridge was shut down in 1997 by U.S. and Mexican authorities because of suspected smuggling. According to other reports, the killing of a Mexican customs inspector at the bridge resulted in its closure.

The bridge's closure in July 30, 1997 created the longest stretch of the Mexico–United States border without a border-crossing station, nearly 400 miles (640 km) between the Presidio–Ojinaga and Del Rio–Acuña crossing stations. A number of individuals have advocated reopening the bridge, citing increased revenue for the area from ecotourism.

In December 1998, the Mexican government submitted a diplomatic note requesting a three-year postponement of the bridge's removal in order to conduct an economic and ecotourism feasibility assessment in the area. The requested extension was approved through July 4, 2002. During an April 2002 meeting US and Mexican authorities, representatives continued discussions, and the two governments later exchanged diplomatic notes extending the suspension of the removal order until June 2003. Although that extension has since lapsed, bilateral negotiations between the US and Mexico remain ongoing to address the status of the moratorium.

In May 2010, Presidents Obama and Calderon jointly recognized the Big Bend–Rio Bravo region as one of the most significant ecological complexes in North America and expressed support for its designation as a natural area of binational interest. On October 24, 2011, the two governments signed the Cooperative Action Plan for Conservation in the Big Bend–Rio Bravo Natural Area of Binational Interest. In September 2011, the Consortium of La Linda (COLINDA) placed its reopening proposal on hold pending guidance from the U.S. Interior Department and Mexico's SEMARNAT on the bridge's role in the broader binational conservation framework. No formal withdrawal or denial of the proposal has occurred.

In 2007, support for the bridge's reopening from the State of Texas was asserted in a resolution.

In 2003, the 78th Texas State Legislature passed a resolution supporting the reopening of the La Linda Bridge, noting that the bridge remained in good condition and local governments in the United States and Mexico supported its reopening as a border crossing.

In April 2025, the Texas Parks and Wildlife Department acquired 671 acres surrounding the bridge through a donation from The Nature Conservancy, which had purchased the land from the Kurie family heirs. The deed includes a public access condition requiring TPWD to allow public access to the Rio Grande Wild and Scenic River. COLINDA's bridge tract was explicitly excluded from the transaction and remains in COLINDA's ownership.

== See also ==
- List of international bridges in North America
