= Presidio–Ojinaga International Bridge =

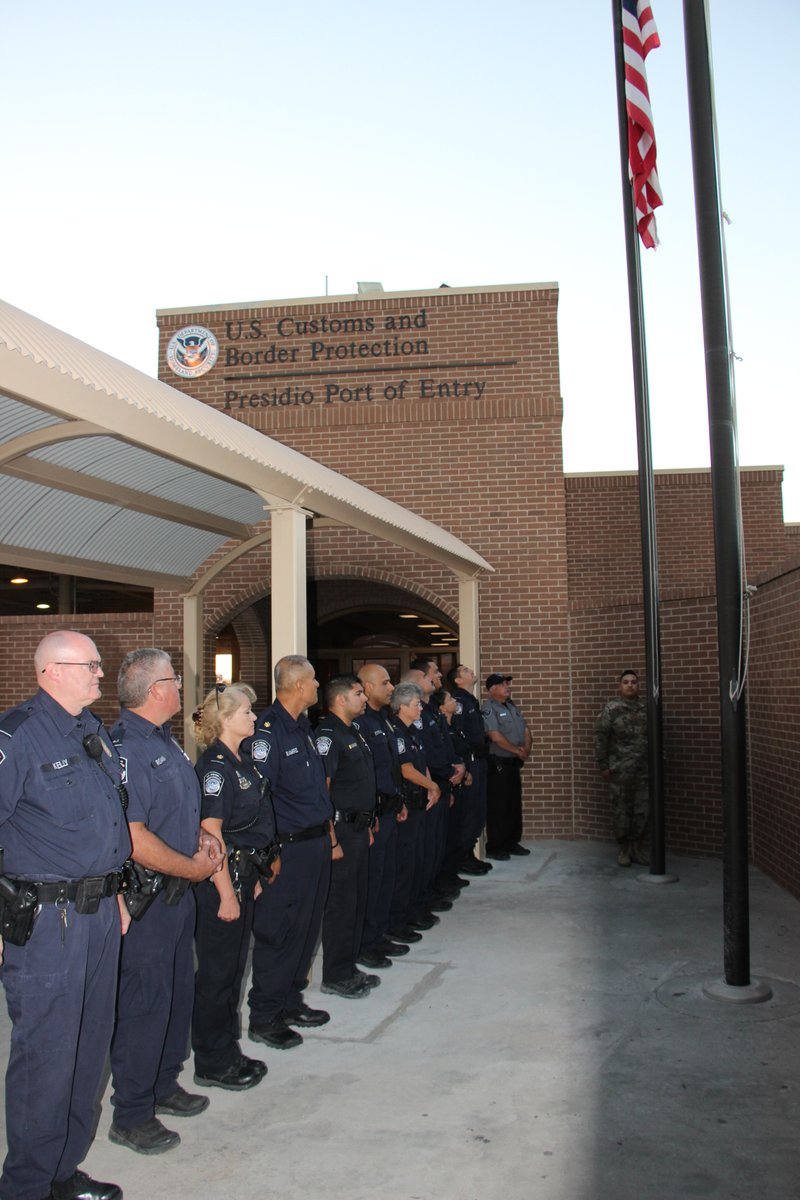
- CBP Officers at the Presidio Port of Entry
- Coordinates: 29°33′42″N 104°23′42″W
- Carries: US 67; Fed. 16
- Crosses: Rio Grande
- Locale: Presidio, Texas
- Other name: Presidio Bridge

Characteristics
- Total length: 791 feet (241 m)
- No. of lanes: 2

History
- Opened: 1985

Statistics
- Toll: Yes

Location
- Interactive map of Presidio–Ojinaga International Bridge

The Presidio–Ojinaga International Bridge, also known simply as the Presidio Bridge and Puente Ojinaga, is an international bridge that crosses the Rio Grande (Río Bravo) between the cities of Presidio, Texas, US, and Ojinaga, Chihuahua, Mexico, on the United States–Mexico border.

== Description and name ==
The bridge is two lanes wide and 791 feet (241 m) long. It connects U.S. Route 67 to the north with Mexican Federal Highway 16 to the south.

The bridge is owned by the State of Texas. It has a toll fee on the Mexican side.

== History ==
The original, privately owned wooden bridge connecting Presidio and Ojinaga was built in the early 1900s. The Presidio port of entry was established by executive order in 1917. The wooden bridge was replaced by the current structure in 1985. The current border inspection station was completed about two years later.

== Border crossing ==
The Presidio Texas Port of Entry is located at the Presidio–Ojinaga International Bridge.

== See also ==
- Presidio–Ojinaga International Rail Bridge, the nearby rail bridge
- List of crossings of the Rio Grande
- List of international bridges in North America
