= Prado Verde, Texas =

- Census-designated place
- Coordinates: 31°53′23″N 106°36′49″W
- Country: United States
- State: Texas
- County: El Paso

Area
  - Total: 0.12 sq mi (0.3 km^{2})
  - Land: 0.12 sq mi (0.3 km^{2})
  - Water: 0 sq mi (0.0 km^{2})
- Elevation: 3,757 ft (1,145 m)

Population (2020)
  - Total: 209
  - Density: 1,800/sq mi (700/km^{2})
- Time zone: UTC-7 (Mountain (MST))
  - Summer (DST): UTC-6 (MDT)
- ZIP code: 79932
- FIPS code: 48-59210
- GNIS feature ID: 2409101

Prado Verde is a census-designated place (CDP) in El Paso County, Texas, United States. As of the 2020 census, Prado Verde had a population of 209. It is part of the El Paso Metropolitan Statistical Area.

== Geography ==
According to the United States Census Bureau, the CDP has a total area of 0.1 square miles (0.26 km^{2}), all land.

== Demographics ==
Historical population
Census	Pop.	Note	%±
2000	200		—
2010	246		23.0%
2020	209		−15.0%
U.S. Decennial Census; 1850–1900 1910; 1920 1930 1940; 1950 1960 1970; 1980 1990 2000; 2010 2020

Prado Verde first appeared as a census-designated place in the 2000 U.S. census.

=== 2020 census ===
Prado Verde CDP, Texas – Racial and ethnic composition Note: the US Census treats Hispanic/Latino as an ethnic category. This table excludes Latinos from the racial categories and assigns them to a separate category. Hispanics/Latinos may be of any race.
Race / Ethnicity (NH = Non-Hispanic)	Pop 2000	Pop 2010	Pop 2020	% 2000	% 2010	% 2020
White alone (NH)	88	69	44	44.00%	28.05%	21.05%
Black or African American alone (NH)	0	4	4	0.00%	1.63%	1.91%
Native American or Alaska Native alone (NH)	0	0	3	0.00%	0.00%	1.44%
Asian alone (NH)	0	1	2	0.00%	0.41%	0.96%
Native Hawaiian or Pacific Islander alone (NH)	0	0	0	0.00%	0.00%	0.00%
Other race alone (NH)	0	0	0	0.00%	0.00%	0.00%
Mixed race or Multiracial (NH)	2	3	4	1.00%	1.22%	1.91%
Hispanic or Latino (any race)	110	169	152	55.00%	68.70%	72.73%
Total	200	246	209	100.00%	100.00%	100.00%

=== 2000 census ===
As of the census of 2000, there were 200 people, 60 households, and 55 families residing in the CDP. The population density was 1,557.7 inhabitants per square mile (601.4/km^{2}). There were 62 housing units at an average density of 482.9 per square mile (186.4/km^{2}). The racial makeup of the CDP was 98.00% White, 0.50% Native American, and 1.50% from two or more races. Hispanic or Latino of any race were 55.00% of the population.

There were 60 households, out of which 51.7% had children under the age of 18 living with them, 85.0% were married couples living together, 3.3% had a female householder with no husband present, and 8.3% were non-families. 8.3% of all households were made up of individuals, and 1.7% had someone living alone who was 65 years of age or older. The average household size was 3.33 and the average family size was 3.51.

In the CDP, the population was spread out, with 35.0% under the age of 18, 6.5% from 18 to 24, 26.5% from 25 to 44, 24.5% from 45 to 64, and 7.5% who were 65 years of age or older. The median age was 36 years. For every 100 females, there were 119.8 males. For every 100 females age 18 and over, there were 97.0 males.

The median income for a household in the CDP was $49,286, and the median income for a family was $68,056. Males had a median income of $38,409 versus $45,179 for females. The per capita income for the CDP was $14,186. None of the families and 3.9% of the population were living below the poverty line.

== Education ==
Prado Verde is in the Canutillo Independent School District. Residents are zoned to Gonzalo and Sofia Garcia Elementary School, and Canutillo Middle School. Canutillo High School is the zoned comprehensive high school for the entire school district.
