= Anthony Independent School District =

School district in Texas, United States

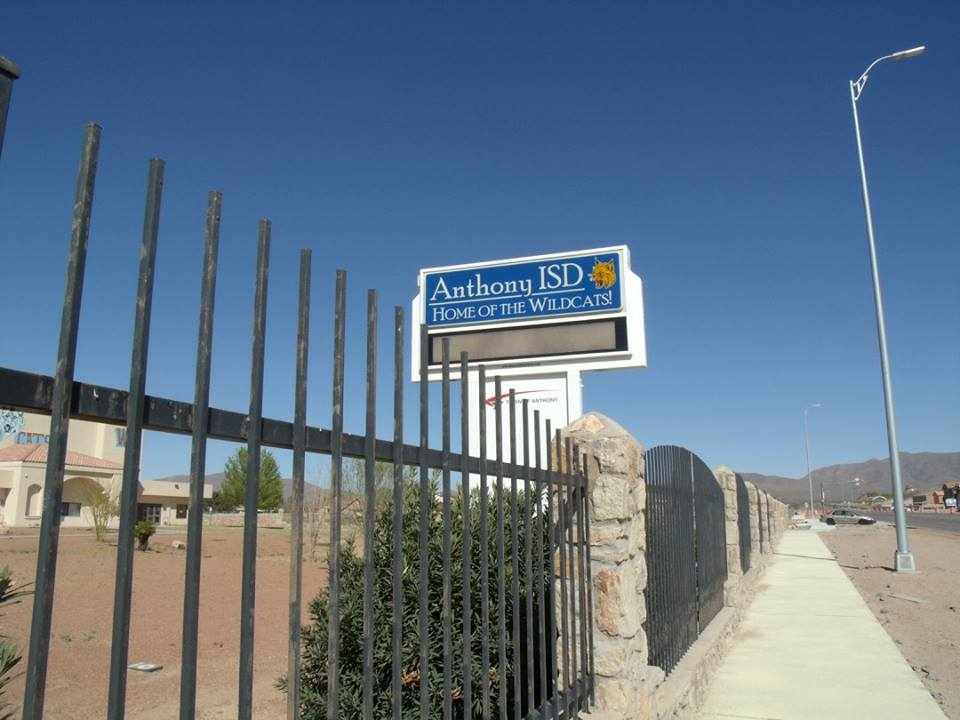

Location
- 840 Sixth St. Anthony, Texas ESC Region 19 United States
- Coordinates: 31°59′42″N 106°36′4″W

District information
- Type: Independent school district
- Grades: Pre-K through 12
- Superintendent: Oscar A. Troncoso
- Schools: Three
- NCES District ID: 4808430

Students and staff
- Students: 750 (2019-20)
- Teachers: 60 (2019-20) (on full-time equivalent (FTE) basis)
- Student–teacher ratio: 20:1 (2019-20)
- Athletic conference: UIL Class 3A
- District mascot: Wildcats
- Colors: Columbia Blue, White, Red

Other information
- TEA District Accountability Rating for 2021-22: Overall Rating - A
- Website: Anthony ISD

Anthony Independent School District is a public school district based in Anthony, Texas, United States. The district operates one high school, Anthony High School, one middle school, Anthony Middle School and one elementary school, Anthony Elementary School.

== District boundaries ==
The Anthony Independent School District serves the entire municipal limit of Anthony, Texas and extends into portions of Vinton, Texas west of Texas Highway 20 and south to La Union Road. The approximate area covered by the district is 7.78 square miles (20.2 km^{2}).

== Finances ==
As of the 2022-2023 school year, the appraised valuation of property in the district was $319,758, 324. The maintenance tax rate was $0.8716 and the bond tax rate was $0.114212 per $100 of appraised valuation. As of 2007, the Texas State Energy Conservation Office awards Anthony ISD money due to the colonias served by the district.

== Academic achievement ==
The Texas Education Agency (TEA) releases its yearly state accountability ratings for over 1,000 school districts and charter schools across Texas. Districts and schools receive A-F ratings. Statewide, hundreds of districts and schools, were rated in 2020 and 2021 as Not Rated: Declared State of Disaster due to the COVID-19 pandemic. The A-F rating system in 2022. On August 15, TEA released its latest accountability ratings and Anthony ISD was one of four (out of 12 in the Region 19 area) districts to earn an overall A rating. All Anthony ISD campuses received an overall score of A or B in the latest accountability ratings. Anthony ISD schools were also recognized with Distinction Designations that include top 25 percent comparative academic growth, postsecondary readiness and top 25 percent comparative results to close gaps.

"While there is still much work to do, this rating demonstrates that we are clearly headed in the right direction academically. This is a reflection of our staff and teachers’ renewed focus on learning outcomes so that we can begin the long road of closing gaps caused by the pandemic. More than anything it shows a united commitment by our school board, our community and staff that our students deserve the very best education possible,” said Dr. Troncoso, Anthony ISD Superintendent.

For a closer look at the new ratings, TEA encourages parents, educators and community members to visit TXschools.gov to view district and school report cards.

Historical district TEA accountability ratings

- 2022: Overall Rating - A
- 2021: Not Rated: Declared State of Disaster
- 2020: Not Rated: Declared State of Disaster
- 2019: Overall Rating - B
- 2018: Overall Rating - B
- 2017: Met Standards
- 2016: Met Standards
- 2015: Met Standards
- 2014: Met Standards
- 2013: Met Standards
- 2012: Met Standards

== Schools ==
The principals at each school are as follows: Jorge G. Reyes at Anthony Elementary School, Veronica Ordonez at Anthony Middle School and Sandra V. Espinoza at Anthony High School. All schools are less than a mile away from the Texas–New Mexico state line. The schools and the administration building are located on the same property between 4th Street and Magdalena to the east and west and Poplar Street–Elm Street and Wildcat Drive. The district property, including the sports fields, takes up at least a dozen square town blocks. The elementary and middle school campuses are required to wear uniforms voted by the school board in 2001 for elementary and 2003 for middle school.

Regular instructional

- Anthony High School
  - Oak Street was renamed Wildcat Drive after the high school was built and the street was expanded to become Texas Spur 6.
- Anthony Middle School
- Anthony Elementary School

== Special programs ==
One Act Play (Theater)

Band (middle and high school)

Blended Learning (via the Math Innovation Zone grant)

Cheerleading Varsity/JV

Character Strong (Social Emotional Learning Program at all 3 Schools)

Dual Credit College Courses

E-Sports (both high school and middle school)

National Honor Society & National Junior Honor Society

Robotics

Speech & Debate

Student Council

Career & Technical Education Courses at CCTE in EPISD and Western Technical Institute

UIL Academics

Yearbook

=== Athletics ===
Anthony High School participates in the following sports for boys, Baseball, Track and Field, Cross Country, Basketball, and Football. The school participates in the following sports for girls, Basketball, Softball, Track and Field, Cross Country, and Volleyball. For the 2024 through 2026 school years, Anthony High School will play all sports in UIL Class 3A. Anthony High School plays their home football games at Tommy Sanchez Memorial Field located on campus across the middle school gym. Anthony also plays their home baseball games at Rascon Park off campus.

=== Cheerleading Chihuahua's competition 2022 Winners ===
Anthony High School won 1st Place locally with a Co-Ed team of 15 members.

=== Volleyball State Champions ===
Anthony high school won 2 state titles in 1975. One in the spring of the 1974-1975 season and one in the fall of 1975-1976 school year. Which makes them the only high school in El Paso County to win a state championship in volleyball. Anthony was also runner up to Orchard in 1972-1973 school year and the 1973-1974 school year.

1975 Conference B Champions: Anthony defeated Overton Leverett's Chapel 15-5, 15-7(1974-1975)

1975 Conference B Champions: Anthony defeated Bronte 6-15, 15-3, 20-18(1975-1976)

=== School safety ===
Security is provided with three campus School Marshals. Each School Marshal completed the Texas Commission on Law Enforcement's (TCOLE) rigorous ten-day course to become certified by the state's top law enforcement agency. In addition, the Town of Anthony's Police Station is located across the street from Anthony ISD. Cameras are strategically positioned throughout the district, inside and outside buildings. A computerized School Check-In system with tracking software has been implemented at all three schools. All doors have been modified with electromechanical access control devices to enhance security. Additional Safety Features: Plasma Air Purification Filters that filter out bacteria, dust, molds and viruses are installed in all three schools. Also, Vaping Sensor Technology has been installed in Anthony Middle and High Schools. Anthony ISD was awarded the Soteria National Leadership Award for being the first to install this technology. Most recently, Anthony ISD has successfully completed training to have earned a designation as a "Heart Safe School District" by Project Adam and El Paso's Children's Hospital.

== See also ==
- Anthony, Texas
- List of school districts in Texas
- List of high schools in Texas
