= Anthony, Texas =

- Town
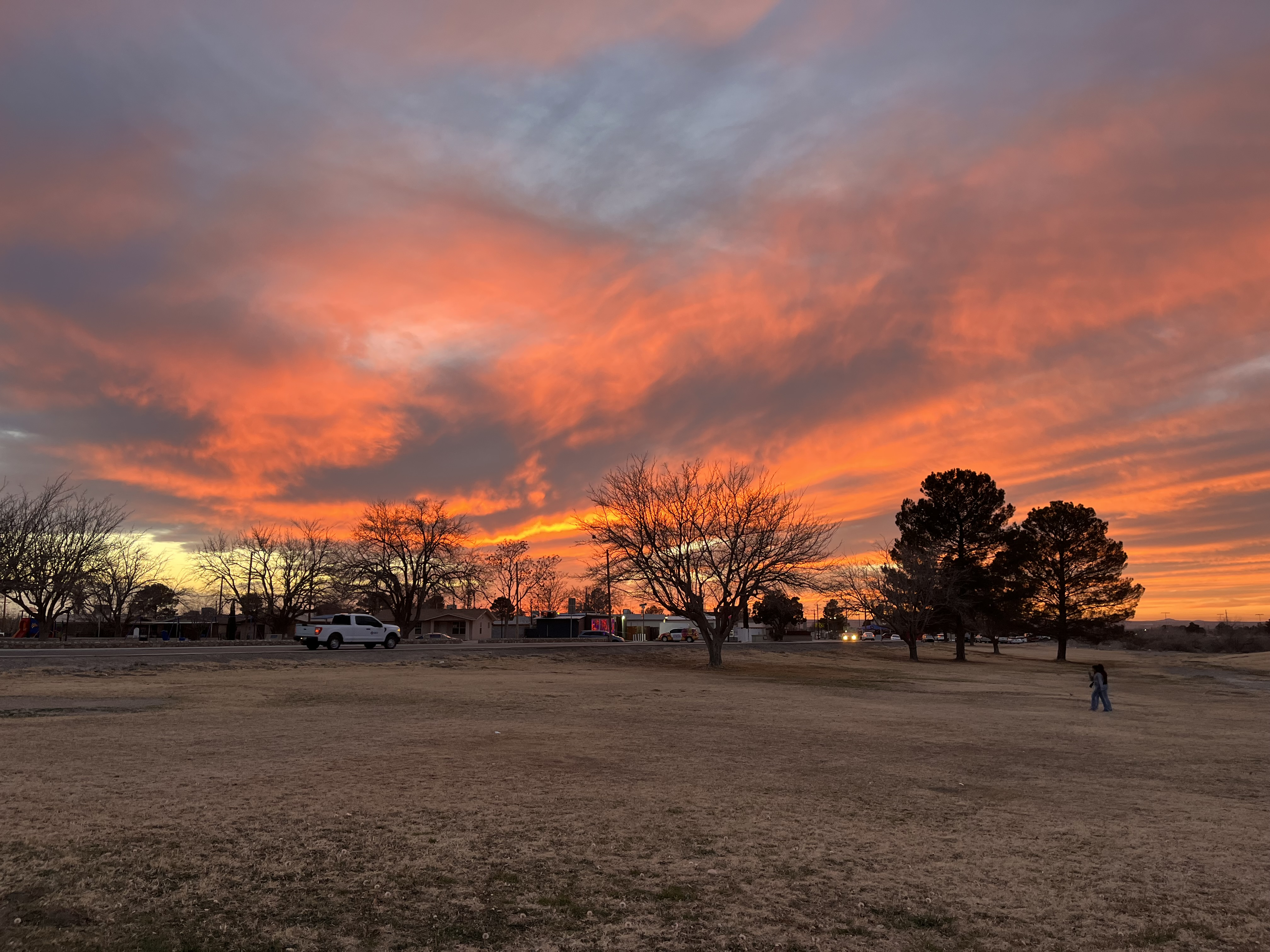

- Flag
- Nickname: Leap Year Capital of the World
- Motto: Gateway to Texas
- Interactive map of Anthony, Texas
- Coordinates: 31°59′41″N 106°35′51″W
- Country: United States
- State: Texas
- County: El Paso
- Incorporated: July 5, 1952

Government
  - Type: Mayor/Aldermen

Area
  - Total: 6.46 sq mi (16.74 km^{2})
  - Land: 6.39 sq mi (16.55 km^{2})
  - Water: 0.069 sq mi (0.18 km^{2})
- Elevation: 3,835 ft (1,169 m)

Population (2020)
  - Total: 3,671
  - Density: 574.5/sq mi (221.8/km^{2})
- Time zone: UTC-7 (Mountain (MST))
  - Summer (DST): UTC-6 (MDT)
- ZIP code: 79821
- Area code: 915
- FIPS code: 48-03432
- GNIS feature ID: 2412368
- Website: townofanthonytx.org

Anthony is an incorporated town in El Paso County, Texas, United States. As of the 2020 census, Anthony had a population of 3,671. It is the first town encountered in Texas when traveling southbound from New Mexico.

== History ==
Anthony was laid out c. 1881, when the Atchison, Topeka and Santa Fe Railway was extended to that point.

== Geography and climate ==
According to the United States Census Bureau, the town has a total area of 6.5 square miles (17 km^{2}), of which 6.5 square miles (17 km^{2}) is land and 0.04 square miles (0.10 km^{2}) (0.31%) is water.

Anthony, New Mexico, in Doña Ana County, New Mexico, borders Anthony, Texas, to the north. They are often considered twin cities, though Anthony, New Mexico, was not incorporated as a city until July 1, 2010.

Anthony has a desert climate, with a high degree of diurnal temperature variation due to the relatively high elevation and aridity.

Climate data for Anthony, Texas
Month	Jan	Feb	Mar	Apr	May	Jun	Jul	Aug	Sep	Oct	Nov	Dec	Year
Record high °F (°C)	78 (26)	89 (32)	96 (36)	98 (37)	105 (41)	112 (44)	111 (44)	108 (42)	102 (39)	98 (37)	86 (30)	76 (24)	112 (44)
Mean daily maximum °F (°C)	60 (16)	66 (19)	73 (23)	81 (27)	89 (32)	97 (36)	97 (36)	94 (34)	90 (32)	81 (27)	68 (20)	59 (15)	79 (26)
Mean daily minimum °F (°C)	29 (−2)	33 (1)	39 (4)	45 (7)	54 (12)	64 (18)	68 (20)	67 (19)	61 (16)	49 (9)	37 (3)	30 (−1)	48 (9)
Record low °F (°C)	−5 (−21)	−2 (−19)	12 (−11)	27 (−3)	33 (1)	45 (7)	53 (12)	51 (11)	34 (1)	24 (−4)	4 (−16)	4 (−16)	−5 (−21)
Average precipitation inches (mm)	0.45 (11)	0.34 (8.6)	0.21 (5.3)	0.09 (2.3)	0.36 (9.1)	0.80 (20)	1.47 (37)	2.06 (52)	1.24 (31)	0.91 (23)	0.37 (9.4)	0.70 (18)	9.00 (229)
Average snowfall inches (cm)	0.4 (1.0)	0.1 (0.25)	0 (0)	0 (0)	0 (0)	0 (0)	0 (0)	0 (0)	0 (0)	0 (0)	0.1 (0.25)	0.2 (0.51)	0.8 (2.0)

== Demographics ==
Historical population
Census	Pop.	Note	%±
1960	1,082		—
1970	2,154		99.1%
1980	2,640		22.6%
1990	3,328		26.1%
2000	3,850		15.7%
2010	5,011		30.2%
2020	3,671		−26.7%
U.S. Decennial Census

=== 2020 census ===
As of the 2020 census, Anthony had a population of 3,671. The median age was 32.6 years. 30.8% of residents were under the age of 18 and 11.6% of residents were 65 years of age or older. For every 100 females, there were 95.6 males, and for every 100 females age 18 and over, there were 90.3 males age 18 and over.

99.2% of residents lived in urban areas, while 0.8% lived in rural areas.

There were 1,184 households in Anthony, of which 50.5% had children under the age of 18 living in them. Of all households, 52.1% were married-couple households, 13.5% were households with a male householder and no spouse or partner present, and 28.2% were households with a female householder and no spouse or partner present. About 14.2% of all households were made up of individuals, and 5.4% had someone living alone who was 65 years of age or older.

There were 1,286 housing units, of which 7.9% were vacant. The homeowner vacancy rate was 2.5% and the rental vacancy rate was 10.8%.

Anthony racial composition (NH = Non-Hispanic) (Note: Note: the US Census treats Hispanic/Latino as an ethnic category. This table excludes Latinos from the racial categories and assigns them to a separate category. Hispanics/Latinos can be of any race.)
Race	Number	Percentage
White (NH)	231	6.29%
Black or African American (NH)	20	0.54%
Native American or Alaska Native (NH)	8	0.22%
Asian (NH)	7	0.19%
Some Other Race (NH)	14	0.38%
Mixed/Multi-Racial (NH)	21	0.57%
Hispanic or Latino	3,370	91.8%
Total	3,671	

=== 2000 census ===
As of the census of 2000, there were 3,850 people, 684 households, and 577 families residing in the town. The population density was 592.5 inhabitants per square mile (228.8/km^{2}). There were 722 housing units at an average density of 111.1 per square mile (42.9/km^{2}). The racial makeup of the town was 11.79% White, 3.87% African American, 1.32% Native American, 0.21% Asian, 0.03% Pacific Islander, Hispanic or Latino of any race were 82.78% of the population.

There were 684 households, out of which 50.1% had children under the age of 18 living with them, 64.2% were married couples living together, 15.6% had a female householder with no husband present, and 15.5% were non-families. 14.8% of all households were made up of individuals, and 9.2% had someone living alone who was 65 years of age or older. The average household size was 3.47 and the average family size was 3.84.

In the town, the population was spread out, with 20.7% under the age of 18, 12.7% from 18 to 24, 41.9% from 25 to 44, 18.1% from 45 to 64, and 6.6% who were 65 years of age or older. The median age was 32 years. For every 100 females, there were 212.0 males. For every 100 females age 18 and over, there were 261.7 males.

The median income for a household in the town was $26,295, and the median income for a family was $28,295. Males had a median income of $21,667 versus $17,273 for females. The per capita income for the town was $11,568. About 22.7% of families and 25.9% of the population were below the poverty line, including 34.4% of those under age 18 and 29.6% of those age 65 or over.

== Town government ==
The Town of Anthony was incorporated on July 5, 1952. The town uses a Mayor/Aldermen system. Currently there are five Aldermen representing the Townspeople. The mayor and aldermen are elected positions held for alternating two-year terms. Current Mayor of Anthony Tx is Martin Lerma The Anthony Town Hall is located at 401 Wildcat across from the Anthony Independent School District Complex. This multi-use facility houses the following town offices:

- Office of the Mayor
- The Anthony Police Department
- The Town Clerk
- The Anthony Water/Sewer Department
- The Anthony Streets/Parks and Recreation Department
- The Anthony Municipal Court

The Anthony Town Hall additionally houses the Anthony Municipal Court Room. This courtroom hosts the Anthony Town Hall meetings, voting, police meetings, and other events.

The Anthony water treatment plant is located at the southern end of Omar Street and provides drinking water and sewage treatment for the town. The majority of Anthony's drinking water comes from wells located near the Rio Grande.

== Parks ==
Anthony has approximately 23 acres (93,000 m^{2}) of developed parks along with approximately 45 acres (180,000 m^{2}) of undeveloped park land.

The Town of Anthony secured a large Texas Parks and Wildlife Department grant (approx: $780,000) in early 2007 to increase the size of Henry Miramontes Park.

Projected improvements include an additional baseball field, parking area, jogging paths, nature walks, a skate park, and much more. A large section of bare desert land on the north side of Antonio Street near the 1400–1600 block is designated to become a soccer field complex with at least 4 fields and home to the Anthony Desert Rats soccer team. The team has yet to be formed and organized. An artist's rendition can be seen posted on the town's web site.

The park land is currently divided into three parks. All parks are closed from 10:00 PM to 6:00 AM.

=== Ernesto Rascon Memorial Baseball Park ===
The baseball park is named after Anthony Police Department's only officer killed in the line of duty. It is located on the east side of Richard White Street north of Franklin Street and south of State Line Road. The park consists of two fenced regulation baseball fields with bleachers and a small building used for maintenance and concessions. It is the baseball field used by the Anthony High School Baseball Team during the official baseball season.

=== Henry Miramontes Park ===
This park is named after a resident who was killed during the Vietnam War. It is located on the west side of Richard White Street north of Franklin Street and south of State Line Road. Most of the park is open and grassy with a few shade trees and benches. The northeast section is fenced in with a dirt road which can be used during open hours to drive in and park. Inside the fenced area is grassy with a few large shade covered slabs of concrete, a large open air basketball court, and a small public restroom building.

Citizens can use the slabs to set up tables and grills for large parties (by permit only when purchased at the Town Hall). The fenced in section of the park is often rented by citizens and organizations to host large events such as car shows, birthday parties, family reunions, and company outings.

In the middle of the park is a small stone monument with a metal plaque dedicated to the memory of Henry Miramontes.

=== Anthony Municipal Park ===
Anthony Park is located on a triangle-shaped island created by Antonio Street, Franklin Street, and 11th Street. It is often called Triangle Park by local residents. This grass-covered park has several shade trees, covered picnic tables, and various sets of playground equipment. During the winter months the trees are decorated with lights. At the east end of the park where Antonio Street and Franklin Street intersect there is a flag pole beside a large metal sign which reads "Welcome to Anthony" in red letters facing to the east towards Interstate 10.

== River walk ==
Within the municipal boundaries of the town along the Rio Grande on the eastern side is a paved pathway with occasional benches and bridges for public use by bicyclists, joggers, walkers, fishers, bird watchers, runners, and other outdoor enthusiasts. The path lies between the river and levee. The path can be accessed under the Vinton bridge and ends at the New Mexico/Texas state line. The path is closed to all forms of motorized travel, including ATVs.

The area within the levees and the levees themselves are administered by the U.S. Section of the International Boundary and Water Commission (USIBWC). The levee is not part of the public use portion of the path, and persons found on the levee can be charged with trespassing.

Fishing is allowed from the bank with a Texas Parks and Wildlife Department-issued fishing license. Discharging of firearms is prohibited by Anthony municipal code, so hunting is not permitted.

== Leap Year Capital of the World and Worldwide Leap Year Birthday Club ==
Every leap year Anthony, Texas, and Anthony, New Mexico, celebrate with an officially sponsored leap year birthday parade and festival.

=== Leap Year Capital of the World ===
In 1988, local resident Mary Ann Brown, a member of the Anthony Chamber of Commerce and born on leap year day, February 29, proposed that the Anthony Chamber of Commerce host a festival centered on Leap Day. In February 1988, based on this celebration and because no other place in the world regularly sponsors such an event, the town's Chamber of Commerce voted to sponsor Ms. Brown's idea of the festival and subsequently declared Anthony, Texas & Anthony, New Mexico to be the joint Leap Year Capitals of the World. United States Senator Pete Domenici of New Mexico entered into the Congressional Record of the United States a request that Congress and the President join in the proclamation. Senator Domenici read it into the Congressional Record Vol. 134, No. 146, Friday, October 14, 1988, of the 100th Congress. In January 1996, the Anthony, New Mexico post office was designated "Leap Year Station" and granted a commemorative postal cancellation. In celebration of the event, the town's postmaster will typically appear as "Leap Year William" and distribute candy to parade attendees. The festival and parade are chaired by the mayor of Anthony, Texas.

=== Worldwide Leap Year Birthday Club ===
Membership for the Leap Year Birthday Club has grown from zero in 1988 to nearly 300 in 1996 and more than 400 members in 2004. Members include individuals from as far away as Europe and have traveled to Anthony to celebrate.

== Education ==
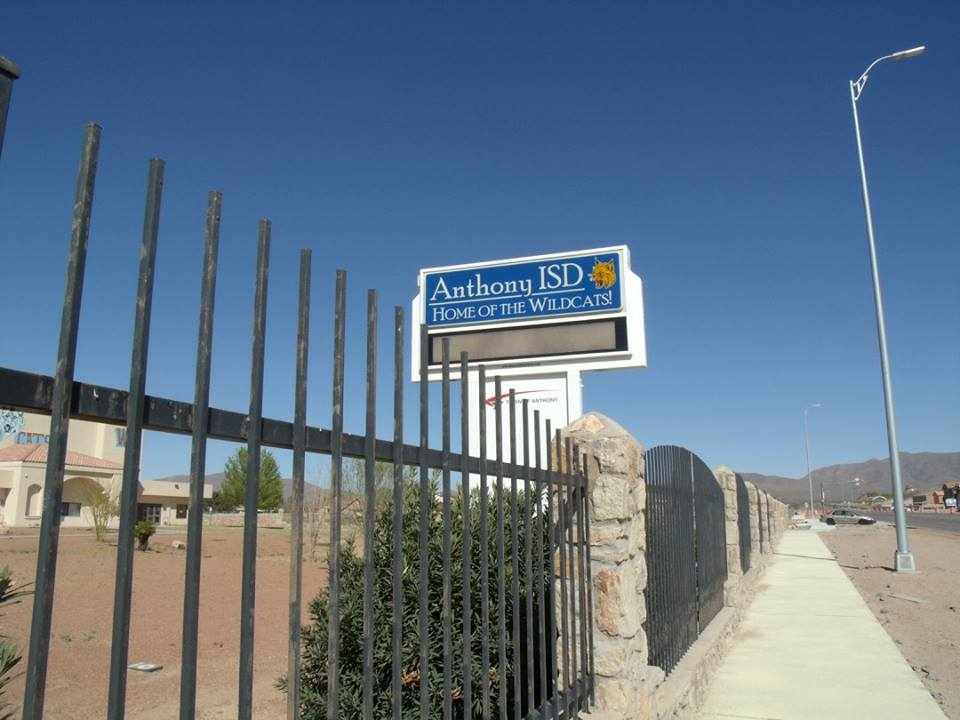
Anthony ISD marquee

The Anthony Independent School District (AISD) serves Anthony.

AISD consists of three campuses (Anthony Elementary, Anthony Middle, and Anthony High) and a district central office, all connected and surrounded by a single fence line. The mascot for the school is Wildcats and the school colors are Columbia blue, red, and white. Each campus is within walking distance of the others and the central office is located between the elementary and middle schools. The students of the elementary and middle school campuses are required to wear uniforms.

El Paso County is within the official service area of El Paso Community College.

== Government and infrastructure ==
Federal Correctional Institution, La Tuna (FCI) is a Federal Bureau of Prisons facility in Anthony.

La Tuna inmates helped build some of the Anthony municipal parks and regularly assist in the day-to-day maintenance of the Anthony town government facility. La Tuna inmates assist Streets/Parks Department workers in a laborer capacity.

The United States Postal Service operates the Anthony Post Office in nearby Anthony, New Mexico.

== Transportation ==
=== Major roadways ===
- Interstate 10 runs north/south through the municipal jurisdiction of Anthony and is the major route to and from the town.
- Texas State Highway 20 runs parallel with I-10. TX 20 along the La Tuna Federal Correctional Institution and south of it is designated Doniphan Street. North of La Tuna Federal Correctional Institution it is designated Main Street. Washington Street marks the division between North Main Street and South Main Street.
- North and South Desert Boulevards are frontage roads to I-10. They are one-way roadways that run parallel to I-10 along each side.
- FM 1905 begins at I-10 and runs west into New Mexico. From east to west, FM 1905 is designated as Antonio Street, then Franklin Street to South Main (TX 20). It continues west from South Main as West Washington to the New Mexico border.
- Texas State Highway Spur 6 (designated as Wildcat Drive, renamed from Oak Street) connects Antonio Street near the I-10 East on/off ramp to TX 20.
- Washington Street runs through the center of town. Main Street marks the division between East Washington Street and West Washington Street.

=== Public transportation ===
- El Paso County Rural Transit Route 10. Schedule info: (915) 532-3474; Route 10 PDF

== Emergency services ==
=== Police ===
- Anthony Police Department (Primary patrol/service call response)
- El Paso County Sheriff's Office (based at the Vinton Station)
- El Paso County Precinct #7 Constable

=== Fire ===
- West Valley Volunteer Fire Department is located within El Paso County Emergency Services District #2.

=== Medical ===
- West Valley Volunteer Fire Department (First Responder Basic EMTs, no ambulance transport)
- Life Ambulance Service, INC. (private EMS ambulance company on contract with El Paso County)

== Curfew ==
Anthony Municipal Code has established a curfew for anyone under the age of 17 between the hours of 10:00 PM and 7:00 AM unless accompanied by a parent, guardian, or family member over the age of 17.

== See also ==
- Anthony, New Mexico
- Rio Grande
- Wet N' Wild Waterworld
