= Mexican Federal Highway 72 =

Highway in Mexico

Federal Highway 72
- Carretera federal 72

Route information
- Maintained by Secretariat of Infrastructure, Communications and Transportation
- Length: 39.00 km (24.23 mi)

Major junctions
- West end: Playa Los Corchos, Nayarit
- SH 78 near Cerritos, Nayarit
- East end: Fed. 15 near Pantano Grande, Nayarit

Location
- Country: Mexico
- State: Nayarit

Highway system
- Mexican Federal Highways; List; Autopistas
← Fed. 71	→ Fed. 74

Federal Highway 72 (Carretera Federal 72) is an untolled federal highway of Mexico. The entire length of the highway is within Nayarit and begins at the beach of Playa Los Corchos. It then passes the town of Santiago Ixcuintla alongside the Río Grande de Santiago before terminating at Mexican Federal Highway 15 south of the village of Pantano Grande.
