= Mexican Federal Highway 24 =

Highway in Mexico

Federal Highway 24
- Carretera federal 24

Route information
- Maintained by Secretariat of Infrastructure, Communications and Transportation
- Length: 482.4 km (299.7 mi)

Major junctions
- East end: Nuevo Palomas, Chihuahua
- West end: Fed. 15 in Pericos, Sinaloa

Location
- Country: Mexico

Highway system
- Mexican Federal Highways; List; Autopistas
← Fed. 23	→ Fed. 25

Federal Highway 24 (Spanish: Carretera Federal 24, Fed. 24) is a toll-free part of the federal highways corridors (Spanish: corredores carreteros federales). Fed. 24 is intended to cross the Sierra Madre Occidental from the area of Hidalgo del Parral, Chihuahua, on the east, to the area of Culiacán, Sinaloa, on the west. A limited central section of about 40 to 50 km is not yet completed or graded. This section lies between the villages of Los Frailes, Durango, on the east, and Soyatita (also known as El Sabino), Sinaloa, on the west. Travel is possible through this area, where the road is not yet completed, on unimproved roads using high clearance two-wheel drive vehicles. The two unconnected segments that extend through Los Frailes and Soyatita are graded, but each segment is unpaved for about the last 75 km. The central gap in the highway is in the rugged mountains of the Sierra Madre Occidental. This uncompleted and unpaved portion of the road is not well signed, there are many intersections with other unimproved roads, and it is easy to get lost off the intended route of the highway. As noted later, getting lost may not be a safe proposition. Further, the unfinished segment on the west is at about 820 meters elevation at Soyatita. Just outside Los Frailes, the road coming from the east is at 2,750 meters elevation. The traveler crossing this gap will have to negotiate this dramatic change in elevation traveling a good deal of the way on unimproved dirt roads. Travel times in this central section can be quite slow.

This central portion of the highway passes directly through the region known as Mexico's Golden Triangle, notorious for drug cultivation, drug trafficking, and related violent drug incidents.

== Northern terminus to Hidalgo del Parral, Chihuahua ==
Fed24 starts in the north at an intersection with the Fed. 16D. This intersection is at a point on the Fed. 16D that is 66 km east of Ciudad Cuauhtémoc and 38 km southwest of Chihuahua City. Fed. 24 then extends in a southerly direction for 184 km to Hidalgo del Parral, Chihuahua. At Hidalgo del Parral Fed. 4 intersects with Fed. 45 which connects Parral with Jiménez to the east and Durango to the south.

== Hidalgo del Parral to the junction at Las Yerbitas (Aserradero Yerbites), Chihuahua ==
From Hidalgo del Parral, the finished section of paved highway going west runs some 220 km in a southwesterly direction to a highway junction at Las Yerbitas (Aserradero Yerbites), passing through El Vergel.

Along this stretch of Fed. 24, at a point 46 km west of Hidalgo del Parral there is an intersection with CHI-23. From this intersection, CHI-23 runs north through Guachochi and Creel to eventually intersect Fed. 16, west of La Junta, Chihuahua.

== Las Yerbitas (Aserradero Yerbites) to Los Frailes, Durango ==
From the junction at Las Yerbitas (Aserradero Yerbites), Fed. 24 continues in a southerly direction for about 75 kilometers past the village of Atascaderos (Buenavista de Atascaderos), Chihuahua, to Los Frailes, Durango, located on the border of Chihuahua and Durango. The highway is graded in all of this section, and is paved for only about 20 km after leaving the junction at Las Yerbitas.

From the Las Yerbitas junction, a paved highway runs west for 25 km to Guadalupe y Calvo.

== Highway gap from the village of Los Frailes, Durango to the village of Soyatita, Sinaloa ==
From Hidalgo del Parral, Fed. 24 was intended to extend southwest to cross the Sierra Madre Occidental mountain range to the coastal area of Culiacan in Sinaloa. However, about 75 km of central section of Fed. 24 is not yet completed.

The east end of the highway is graded beyond the village of Los Frailes, Durango (Lat. 25.640171°, Long. -106.906229°), but the last 75 km of this roadway is not paved. The west end of the highway is graded through the village of Soyatita, Sinaloa (Lat. 25.738929°, Long. -107.305406°), and the last 75 km of this stretch is also not paved.

Between Los Frailes on the east and Soyatita on the west there is a gap of about 75 km. There is a distance of about 40 to 50 km in this section that has not been improved. Travelers can drive between these two points on a commonly used dirt road, but this roadway is neither graded or paved. In addition there are many places where other unmarked roads intersect with the highway. It is easy to lose one's way and get lost. There are no reliable maps detailing the road between the two ends of the graded road of Fed. 24. For orientation of those Fed. 24 travelers passing through this gap, about midway in this uncompleted section is the village of Huixiopa, Sinaloa (Lat. 25.755591°, Long. -107.191204°).

The unfinished segment on the west is at about 820 meters elevation at Soyatita. Just outside Los Frailes, the road coming from the east is at 2,750 meters elevation. In crossing the last unfinished gap, the highway construction will have to complete an all-weather road that conveys vehicles over this 1,930 meter elevation change. Until then, the traveler crossing this gap will have to negotiate this very significant change in elevation on dirt roads.

As noted above, because of the maze of unsigned roads in the central section, the traveler can get lost. Both Soyatita and Los Frailes have between 300 and 400 inhabitants. There are not any known overnight accommodations. Being caught by night in this area would increase travel risks. Getting lost in this area may not be a safe proposition. The unfinished gap in Fed. 24 lies in the heart of the rugged Sierra Madre Occidental, and the road passes within 1 km of the point where the borders of Chihuahua, Durango and Sinaloa meet. The general area surrounding this three-way junction of state borders is known as the "Golden Triangle of Mexico", a dangerous area which is well known for drug growing, drug trafficking, and violent drug related incidents.

== Soyatita to southern terminus near Pericos, Sinaloa ==
The graded section of Fed. 24 in Sinaloa, the first 50 to 55 km of which is not yet paved, commences at the village of Soyatita and extends approximately 130 km in a southwesterly direction through Tameapa and Badiraguato to reach Fed. 15 in the vicinity of Pericos. This is the southern terminus of Fed. 24.

== See also ==
- Mexican drug war
- Sinaloa Cartel
