= Mexican Federal Highway 74 =

Highway in Mexico

Federal Highway 74
- Carretera federal 74

Route information
- Maintained by Secretariat of Infrastructure, Communications and Transportation
- Length: 36.00 km (22.37 mi)

Major junctions
- West end: Fed. 76D / Fed. 76 near San Blas, Nayarit
- East end: Fed. 15 in Crucero de San Blas, Nayarit

Location
- Country: Mexico
- State: Nayarit

Highway system
- Mexican Federal Highways; List; Autopistas
← Fed. 72	→ Fed. 76

Federal Highway 74 (Carretera Federal 74) (Fed. 74) is a toll-free part of the federal highway corridors (los corredores carreteros federales) of Mexico. The entire length of the highway is within Nayarit.
