= Autopista Tepic–San Blas =

Toll highway in Mexico

Federal Highway 76D
- Carretera federal 76D
- Autopista Tepic–San Blas

Route information
- Maintained by Red de Carreteras de Occidente, S.A. de C.V.
- Length: 32.4 km (20.1 mi)
- Existed: February 17, 2017–present

Major junctions
- East end: Fed. 74 at San Blas, Nayarit
- Fed. 76 near Aticama, Nayarit
- West end: Fed. 15D in Tepic, Nayarit

Location
- Country: Mexico
- State: Nayarit

Highway system
- Mexican Federal Highways; List; Autopistas

The Autopista Tepic–San Blas is a toll highway in the Mexican state of Nayarit. The 32.4-kilometre (20.1 mi) road was constructed and is operated by Red de Carreteras de Occidente, which As of 2026 charges cars 100 pesos to travel the full length of the road.

== History ==
RCO was the only bidder for the toll road, winning on April 22, 2016, though construction of the road had begun in October 2009. The road was inaugurated by President Enrique Peña Nieto on February 21, 2017, together with the Libramiento de Tepic.
