= Canutillo Independent School District =

School district in Texas, United States

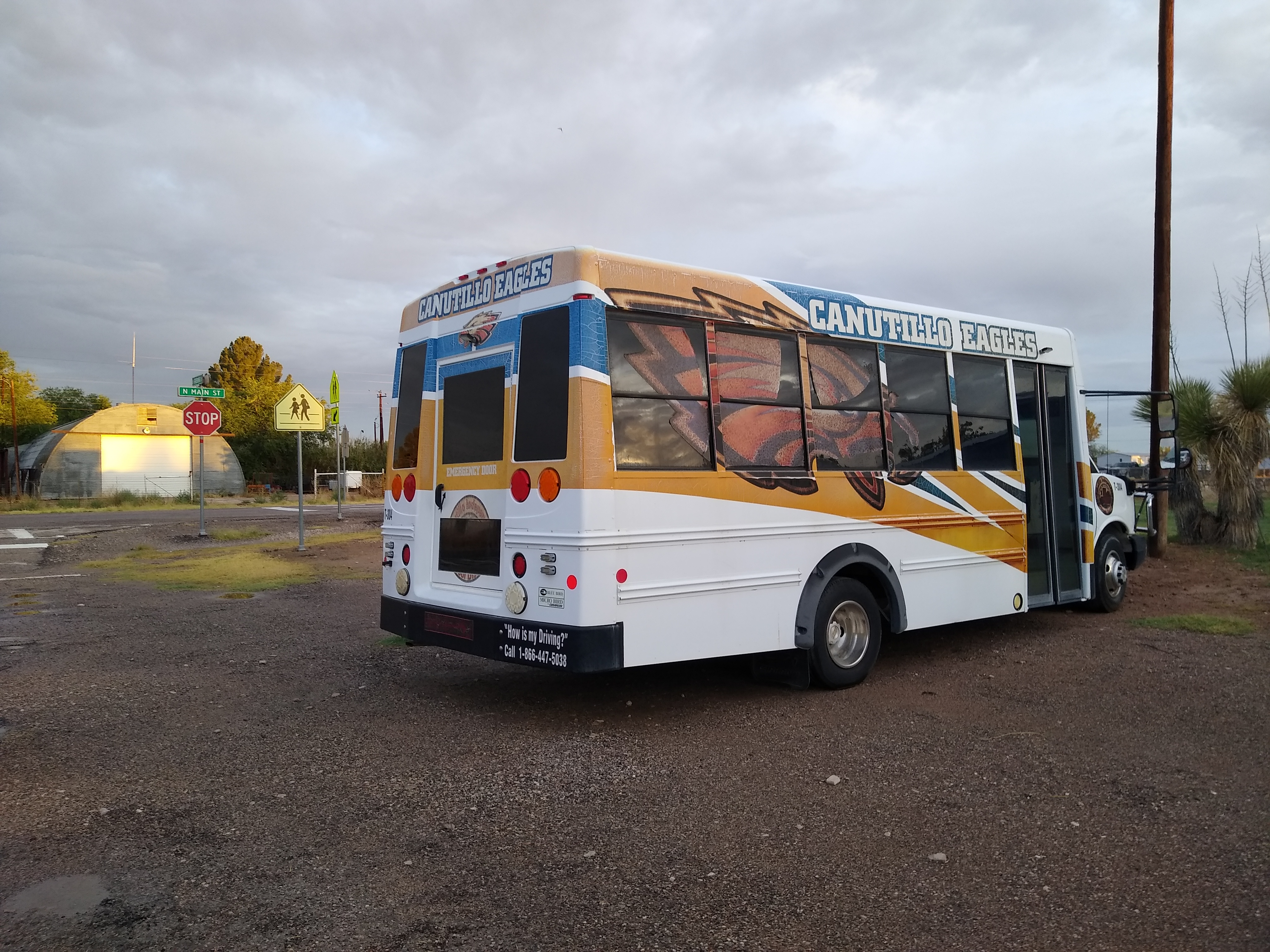
Canutillo ISD school bus

Canutillo Independent School District (CISD) is a public school district with its headquarters in El Paso, Texas. Dr. Pedro Galaviz is the Superintendent of Schools.

The district opened on April 18, 1959. In addition to Canutillo, the district serves almost all of Vinton as well as the communities of Prado Verde and Westway. A portion of El Paso also lies within the district. Construction is quickly filling in raw land within Canutillo ISD boundaries.

In 2011, the school district was rated "recognized" by the Texas Education Agency.

The district's Northwest Early College High School is a 2018 recipient of the U.S. Department of Education's Blue Ribbon School of Excellence award.

== Schools ==
=== High School (Grades 9-12) ===
Both are in El Paso

- Canutillo High School
- Northwest Early College High School

=== Middle Schools (Grades 6-8) ===
Both are in Canutillo

- Canutillo Middle located at 7311 Bosque road
- Jose Alderete Middle

=== Elementary Schools (Grades PK-5) ===
- Bill Childress Elementary (Vinton)
- Canutillo Elementary (Canutillo)
- Deanna Davenport Elementary (Westway)
- Jose H. Damian Elementary
- Gonzalo & Sofia Garcia Elementary - 6550 Westside Drive, unincorporated El Paso County (El Paso, TX address) 79932. Founded in 2007 through a bond that was passed by the Canutillo, TX voters in 2006. The school, built in a rural setting, surrounded by cotton fields, pecan groves, cows and horses, opened its doors March 31, 2008. The school has the capacity for 750 students but has never had more than 647 students enrolled. The school was rated "Recognized" by TEA in 2011-2013 based on TAKS scores for 3rd, 4th and 5th grade students. School has met NCLB AYP measures every year.
- Congressman Silvestre & Carolina Reyes Elementary: Grades Pk-5; opened 2015
