= Anthony, Fannin County, Texas =

Unincorporated community in Texas, US

Anthony
- Unincorporated community
- Location in Texas
- Coordinates: 33.6767710°N 96.3733188°W
- Country: United States
- State: Texas
- County: Fannin
- Named for: Anthony family
- Elevation: 535 ft (163 m)

Anthony is an unincorporated community in Fannin County, Texas, United States. Situated on Farm to Market Road 1753, it was settled by the Anthony family in the 1880s. A post office operated there from 1894 to 1907. As of 1990, the population was 10.
