= Mexican Federal Highway 76 =

Highway in Mexico

Federal Highway 76
- Carretera federal 76

Route information
- Maintained by Secretariat of Infrastructure, Communications and Transportation
- Length: 77.42 km (48.11 mi)

Major junctions
- West end: Fed. 76D / Fed. 74 near San Blas
- East end: Fed. 15D in Tepic, Nayarit

Location
- Country: Mexico
- State: Nayarit

Highway system
- Mexican Federal Highways; List; Autopistas
← Fed. 74	→ Fed. 80

Federal Highway 76 (Carretera Federal 76) (Fed. 76) is a free (libre) part of the federal highways corridors (los corredores carreteros federales) of Mexico. The entire length of the highway is within Nayarit.
