= Presidio–Ojinaga International Rail Bridge =

- Coordinates: 29°32′35″N 104°22′40″W
- Crosses: Rio Grande (Río Bravo)
- Locale: Presidio, Texas; Ojinaga, Chihuahua
- Other name(s): Presidio Rail Bridge; Puente Ferro Carril Ojinaga
- Preceded by: Ojinaga–Presidio International Bridge
- Followed by: La Linda International Bridge (closed)

Characteristics
- Total length: 795 ft. (242 m)
- Width: 21 ft. (6.5 m)

Rail characteristics
- No. of tracks: 1
- Track gauge: 1,435 mm (4 ft 8 1/2 in)

Location
- Interactive map of Presidio–Ojinaga International Rail Bridge

The Presidio–Ojinaga International Rail Bridge (also known as the Presidio Rail Bridge) is an international railway bridge connecting the United States-Mexico border cities of Presidio, Texas and Ojinaga, Chihuahua. It crosses the Rio Grande (Río Bravo) approximately 2 miles (3.2 kilometres) downstream of the Presidio-Ojinaga International Bridge. Returning to service awaits completion of a U.S. Customs and Border Protection (CBP) facility.

== History ==
The bridge has been out of service following fire damage on 29 February 2008. Reconstruction started in 2018. Reopening to cross-border rail service is expected to begin in 2026, after the CBP inspection station is completed.

== Ownership ==
It is owned by the Mexican government and the Texas Department of Transportation. It is privately operated under a lease by Ferromex subsidiary Texas Pacifico Transportation.

== See also ==
- List of crossings of the Rio Grande
- Presidio–Ojinaga International Bridge: The road bridge that lies nearby upstream.
- List of international bridges in North America
