= Anthony, Bexar County, Texas =

Ghost town in Texas, US

Anthony
- Ghost town
- Location in Texas
- Coordinates: 29°29′51″N 98°28′44″W
- Country: United States
- State: Texas
- County: Bexar

Anthony is a ghost town in Bexar County, Texas, United States. It was established between 1900 and 1931, as a company town of the Alamo Portland Cement Company. Situated on the Missouri–Kansas–Texas Railroad, it had a shrine, church and school. It was abandoned by the end of the 20th century.
