= Wagon Wheel Gap, Colorado =

Mountain pass in Colorado, USA

Wagon Wheel Gap
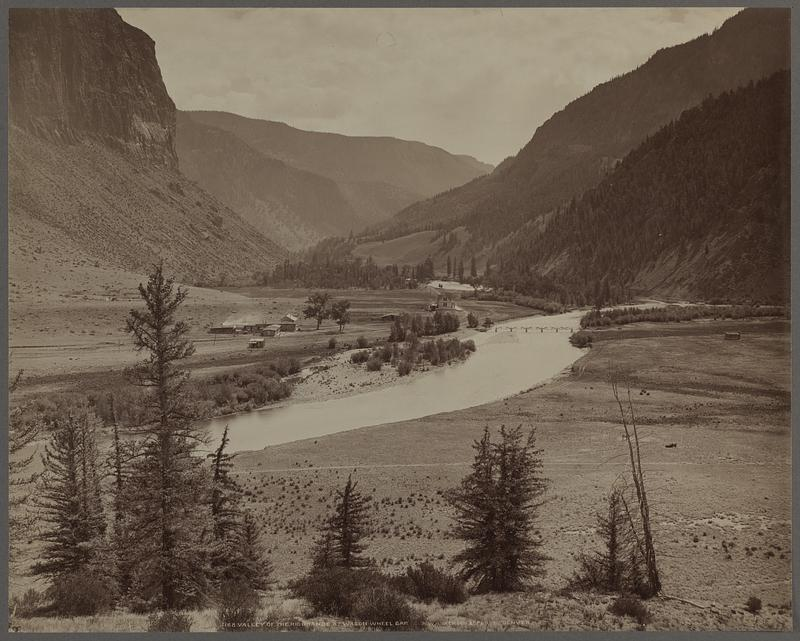
- Rio Grande at Wagon Wheel Gap, between 1879 and 1894

- Location within Colorado
- Elevation: 8,468 feet (2,581 m)

Third Approach
- Location: Mineral County, Colorado
- Coordinates: 37.7736°N 106.8312°W

Wagon Wheel Gap is a gap and ghost town alongside the Rio Grande River, 7.5 miles (12.1 km) southeast of Creede Mineral County, Colorado. Wagon Wheel Gap, on the Silver Thread Scenic and Historic Byway (Colorado State Highway 149), is at 8,468 feet (2,581 m) in altitude.

== History ==
The hot springs at Wagon Wheel Gap were called "Little Medicine", as compared to the "Big Medicine" at Pagosa Springs, by the Ute people because of their healing properties.

Settlers arrived at Wagon Wheel Gap by 1848 and farmed the land. Miners entered the area to prospect for precious metals, which Utes like Colorow thought that their digging and taking the rocks made the gods angry. In 1860, a miner named Charles Baker had a confrontation with Colorow and he ran away from the Ute. While crossing the Rio Grande at the gap, Baker lost a wagon wheel and wrecked his wagon. The wheel remained stuck in the mud. After that, the spot was known as Wagon Wheel Gap.

Wagon Wheel Gap was the first tollgate for travel between South Fork and Lake City. In the 1870s it was a stage stop and a supply town.

There were not many settlers in the area until railroad magnate William Jackson Palmer transported and provided lodging for visitors to the hot springs beginning in 1883. At the turn of the century, Palmer built a bath house. In the 1950s, the bath house was renamed 4UR Ranch. The resort, now listed on the National Register of Historic Places, was purchased by the Leavell family in 1972.

Fluorspar mines, near the gap, operated from 1911 to 1950. Colorado Fuel & Iron sold the mine to the Leavell family in 1980.

Today, Wagon Wheel Gap is part of a dude ranch that offers bathing in the hot springs.
