= Pericos =

Town in Sinaloa, Mexico

Coordinates: 25.083°N 107.700°W

Pericos is a town situated in the Municipality of Mocorito in the Mexican state of Sinaloa. As of the 2010 census, there are 6,244 inhabitants. It is the most populated town in the municipality. Pericos is at 60 m (200 ft) of elevation. Approximately 85% of residents are catholic. And this town is known for its beauty and history
