= Vinton, Texas =

- Village
- Village of Vinton
- Logo

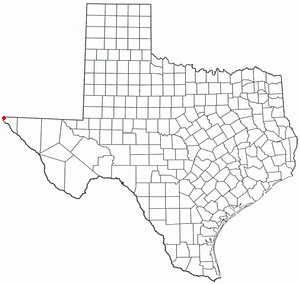
- Location of Vinton, Texas

- Coordinates: 31°57′34″N 106°35′37″W
- Country: United States
- State: Texas
- County: El Paso
- Incorporated: 1961

Government
  - Type: Mayor-council

Area
  - Total: 2.74 sq mi (7.10 km^{2})
  - Land: 2.74 sq mi (7.10 km^{2})
  - Water: 0 sq mi (0.00 km^{2})
- Elevation: 3,839 ft (1,170 m)

Population (2020)
  - Total: 2,684
  - Density: 979/sq mi (378/km^{2})
- Time zone: UTC-7 (Mountain (MST))
  - Summer (DST): UTC-6 (MDT)
- ZIP code: 79821
- Area code: 915
- FIPS code: 48-75668
- GNIS feature ID: 2413596
- Website: vintontx.govoffice2.com

Vinton is a village in El Paso County, Texas, United States. The population was 2,684 at the 2020 census. It is part of the El Paso Metropolitan Statistical Area.

== History ==
Native Americans inhabited the site of Vinton before the arrival of the Spaniards, who made it a stopping place along the Camino Real, the road from El Paso to Santa Fe, which passed along the east bank of the Rio Grande through what is now Vinton. In Spanish and Mexican colonial times, it was known as La Salinera, from the salt cedars which grew there in abundance; when the area passed to the United States after the US-Mexican War, this water stop became known as Cottonwood, and was located in the northern part of Vinton along the river, 22 miles from El Paso. In 1857, it was used by the San Antonio-San Diego Mail Line and from 1858 to 1861 by the Butterfield Overland Mail, that had a stage station called Cottonwood Station, located 22 miles from El Paso and 25 miles from Fort Fillmore up river in New Mexico.

Vinton was named for Southern Pacific Railroad surveyor John C. Vinton, who laid the cross-country route for the railroad through the area in 1881, and was most likely established around that time. A post office was opened there in 1892, and the town grew slowly in the next 100 years, reaching 605 in 1990, then tripling in population in the following decade to 1892 in the 2000 census. The incorporation of Vinton as Village of Industry on August 8, 1961 originated with Border Steel Corporation, which opened a mill in town that year; now owned by Arcelor Mittal, it is still in operation.

== Geography ==
According to the United States Census Bureau, the village has a total area of 2.4 square miles (6.2 km^{2}), all land.

== Demographics ==
Historical population
Census	Pop.	Note	%±
1980	372		—
1990	605		62.6%
2000	1,892		212.7%
2010	1,971		4.2%
2020	2,684		36.2%
U.S. Decennial Census

=== 2020 Census data ===
Vinton racial composition (NH = Non-Hispanic) (Note: Note: the US Census treats Hispanic/Latino as an ethnic category. This table excludes Latinos from the racial categories and assigns them to a separate category. Hispanics/Latinos can be of any race.)
Race	Number	Percentage
White (NH)	363	13.52%
Black or African American (NH)	70	2.61%
Native American or Alaska Native (NH)	63	2.35%
Asian (NH)	20	0.75%
Pacific Islander (NH)	2	0.07%
Some Other Race (NH)	6	0.22%
Mixed/Multi-Racial (NH)	9	0.34%
Hispanic or Latino	2,151	80.14%
Total	2,684	

As of the 2020 United States census, there were 2,684 people, 432 households, and 379 families residing in the village.

=== 2000 Census data ===
As of the census of 2000, there were 1,892 people, 496 households, and 431 families residing in the village. The population density was 779.9 inhabitants per square mile (301.1/km^{2}). There were 520 housing units at an average density of 214.4 per square mile (82.8/km^{2}). The racial makeup of the village was 80.44% White, 1.00% African American, 0.16% Native American, 0.11% Asian, 15.59% from other races, and 2.70% from two or more races. Hispanic or Latino of any race were 93.60% of the population.

There were 496 households, out of which 67.1% had children under the age of 18 living with them, 66.7% were married couples living together, 13.9% had a female householder with no husband present, and 13.1% were non-families. 11.9% of all households were made up of individuals, and 4.0% had someone living alone who was 65 years of age or older. The average household size was 3.81 and the average family size was 4.13.

In the village, the population was spread out, with 43.0% under the age of 18, 9.8% from 18 to 24, 31.5% from 25 to 44, 12.7% from 45 to 64, and 3.0% who were 65 years of age or older. The median age was 23 years. For every 100 females, there were 101.9 males. For every 100 females age 18 and over, there were 95.8 males. The median income for a household in the village was $26,779, and the median income for a family was $27,240. Males had a median income of $22,955 versus $14,777 for females. The per capita income for the village was $9,974. About 25.2% of families and 30.4% of the population were below the poverty line, including 31.6% of those under age 18 and 32.8% of those age 65 or over.

== Education ==
Almost all of Vinton is served by the Canutillo Independent School District, while a small section is in the Anthony Independent School District. Childress Elementary School is located in the village, and it is zoned to Childress for pre-kindergarten to fifth grades, and Canutillo Middle School for sixth to eighth grades. High-school students attend Canutillo High School and may also attend Northwest Early College High School should they qualify for admission.
