= National Republican Congressional Committee =

Republican Hill committee in the United States

- Founded: 1866; 160 years ago
- Purpose: To elect Republicans to the United States House of Representatives
- Location(s): 320 First Street SE, Washington, D.C. 20003, United States
- Chair: Richard Hudson (NC–9)
- Parent organization: Republican Party
- Website: nrcc.org

The National Republican Congressional Committee (NRCC) is the Republican Hill committee which works to elect Republicans to the United States House of Representatives.

The NRCC was formed in 1866, when the Republican caucuses of the House and Senate formed a "Congressional Committee". It supports the election of Republicans to the House through direct financial contributions to candidates and Republican Party organizations; technical and research assistance to Republican candidates and party organizations; voter registration, education and turnout programs; and other party-building activities. It is a registered 527 group.

== NRCC leadership ==
The NRCC is always chaired by a Republican member of the House, who may serve up to two consecutive terms. It is governed by an executive committee of 11 members, which includes the party's leader in the House ex officio, and other members elected by the Republican Conference following a House election.

The chairman is elected by the House Republican Conference after each congressional election. The eight elected leaders of the Republican Conference of the House of Representatives serve as ex officio members of the NRCC's executive committee.

The day-to-day operations of the NRCC are overseen by the executive director, who manages a staff involved in campaign strategy development, planning and management, research, digital, communications, fundraising, administration, and legal compliance.

In addition to the chairman, several other members of the House of Representatives aid the efforts of the committee by overseeing various areas important to the NRCC.

The NRCC is broken down into several internal divisions: Executive, Treasury, Research, Political, Finance, Communications, and Digital.

== List of chairs ==
Name	State	Term
Joseph W. Babcock	Wisconsin	1893–1903
Frank P. Woods	Iowa	1913–1919
Simeon D. Fess	Ohio	1919–1922
William R. Wood	Indiana	1922–1933
Chester C. Bolton	Ohio	1933–1935
Joseph W. Martin Jr.	Massachusetts	1935–1939
J. William Ditter	Pennsylvania	1939–1943
Charles A. Halleck	Indiana	1943–1945
Leonard Hall	New York	1945–1953
Richard M. Simpson	Pennsylvania	1953–1960
William E. Miller	New York	1960–1961
Bob Wilson	California	1961–1973
Robert H. Michel	Illinois	1973–1975
Guy Vander Jagt	Michigan	1975–1993
Bill Paxon	New York	1993–1997
John Linder	Georgia	1997–1999
Tom Davis	Virginia	1999–2003
Tom Reynolds	New York	2003–2007
Tom Cole	Oklahoma	2007–2009
Pete Sessions	Texas	2009–2013
Greg Walden	Oregon	2013–2017
Steve Stivers	Ohio	2017–2019
Tom Emmer	Minnesota	2019–2023
Richard Hudson	North Carolina	2023–2027

== Programs ==
=== Young Guns program ===
Founded in the 2007–2008 election cycle by congressmen Eric Cantor, Kevin McCarthy and Paul Ryan, the Young Guns program began as an organization of House Republicans dedicated to electing open seat and challenger candidates nationwide.

During the 2008 cycle, through a partnership of Republican volunteers, donors and 59 members of the House of Representatives, five House GOP challengers won against incumbent Democrats. Four of those were Young Guns – Tom Rooney (FL-16), Bill Cassidy (LA-06), Lynn Jenkins (KS-02), and Pete Olson (TX-22).

Under the leadership of Chairman Sessions, the NRCC adopted the Young Guns program as the candidate recruitment and training program for House Republicans. It is designed to assist Republican candidates for the House of Representatives.

This program is open to all Republican candidates – regardless of a primary or convention situation in their districts. Those enrolled work with NRCC staff to meet outlined benchmarks designed to improve their campaign structure, fundraising, communications and online strategy.

There are three levels of the Young Guns program – "On the Radar," "Contender," and "Young Gun." In 2010, 92 campaigns were granted "Young Gun" status.

=== Patriot Program ===
Following the 2008 United States House of Representatives elections, the NRCC revamped its incumbent protection program, renaming it the Patriot Program. Candidates given the "patriot" designation are provided additional funding and organizational assistance for their reelection campaigns. Candidates in the Patriot Program represent key districts and are perceived as vulnerable due to the likelihood of a close contest in their upcoming elections.

In 2010, nine of the ten candidates endorsed by the Patriot Program won reelection. The candidates endorsed by the Patriot Program in 2010 were Rep. Dan Lungren (CA-03), Rep. Ken Calvert (CA-44), Rep. Brian Bilbray (CA-50), Rep. Judy Biggert (IL-13), Rep. Joseph Cao (LA-02), Rep. Thaddeus McCotter (MI-11), Rep. Erik Paulsen (MN-03), Rep. Leonard Lance (NJ-07), Rep. Christopher Lee (NY-26), and Rep. Dave Reichert (WA-08).

In 2012, seven of the ten candidates endorsed by the Patriot Program won reelection. The candidates endorsed by the Patriot Program in 2012 were Rep. Sean Duffy (WI-07), Rep. Allen West (FL-22), Rep. Lou Barletta (PA-11), Rep. Pat Meehan (PA-07), Rep. Frank Guinta (NH-01), Rep. Joe Heck (NV-03), Rep. Francisco "Quico" Canesco (TX-23), Rep. Mike Fitzpatrick (PA-08), and Rep. Tom Latham (IA-03).

In 2018, only four of the ten candidates endorsed by the Patriot Program won reelection with the other six either losing or retiring. The candidates endorsed by the Patriot Program in 2018 were Rep. David Valadao (CA-21), Rep. Steve Knight (CA-25), Rep. Darrell Issa (CA-49), Rep. Brian Mast (FL-18), Rep. Jason Lewis (MN-02), Rep. John Faso (NY-19), Rep. Claudia Tenney (NY-22), Rep. Brian Fitzpatrick (PA-08), Rep. Will Hurd (TX-23), and Rep. Barbara Comstock (VA-10).

In 2020, all ten candidates endorsed by the Patriot Program won reelection. The candidates endorsed by the Patriot Program in 2020 were Rep. Fred Upton (MI-06), Rep. Don Bacon (NE-02), Rep. Lee Zeldin (NY-01), Rep. John Katko (NY-24), Rep. Brian Fitzpatrick (PA-01), Rep. Michael McCaul (TX-10), Rep. Pete Olson (TX-22), Rep. Will Hurd (TX-23), Rep. John Carter (TX-31), and Rep. Jaime Herrera Beutler (WA-03).

== Fundraising ==
In 2000 and 2002, one-third of the committee's $210.8 million raised was in soft money donations. The committee held record-breaking events featuring President George W. Bush.

After the ban of soft money donations, the NRCC's fundraising sources and techniques have been criticized. For the 2004 election cycle, its top three donors included two Indian tribal clients of Jack Abramoff. Others include gambling interests (also related to Abramoff).

On September 21, 2006, Chairman Tom Reynolds met with lobbyists in Washington, D.C. to warn them to contribute only to Republicans and not to challengers from the Democratic Party because their donations would be tracked and they would lose favors among the Republican members of Congress. Similar activities of the K Street Project occurred when Davis was head of the NRCC; the organization was fined by the Federal Election Commission for transferring funds between PACs for the same candidates in violation of contribution limits.

The NRCC has also offered awards such as "Physician of the Year", "Businessman of the Year", "Columnist of the Year" and "Congressional Order of Merit" to very few individuals each year.

In April 2021, it was reported that the NRCC had sent donors prechecked boxes that would automatically sign donors up for repeating donations every month if not unchecked. The NRCC sent this message in tandem: "If you UNCHECK this box, we will have to tell Trump you're a DEFECTOR." The message was removed after The New York Times reported on the tactic.

== Automated phone calls ==
In 2006, just days before the November 7 midterm congressional elections, there were numerous reports of a series of automated phone calls ("robocalls") being authorized by the NRCC, with the apparent intention to confuse and annoy the supporters of Democratic candidates for the House of Representatives. The automated call would typically begin by saying, "Hello, I'm calling with information about ___" and naming the Democratic candidate. If the recipient hung up, the call would be repeated, often several times, thus leading voters to believe incorrectly that the Democratic campaign was harassing them. The NRCC used the tactic in at least 53 competitive House races.

In New Hampshire, the state attorney general's office requested that the NRCC end the robocalls, but many individuals in the state continued to report receiving them. The Democratic Congressional Campaign Committee sent the NRCC a cease-and-desist letter. The DCCC letter cited the Federal Communications Commission (FCC) regulation requiring that a prerecorded telephone call must identify the responsible entity at the beginning of the message, and must include the entity's telephone number. Because the NRCC's calls did not name the NRCC at the beginning and did not provide a contact phone number, the DCCC charged the NRCC with "a pattern of willful noncompliance with FCC requirements".

== Embezzlement ==
On March 13, 2008, the NRCC stated that its former treasurer, Christopher J. Ward, had apparently transferred "several hundred thousand dollars" in NRCC funds to "his personal and business bank accounts". Ward embezzled an estimated $724,000 from the NRCC bybetween 2001 and 2007. Ward has served as treasurer for 83 Republican committees and has done work for the Swift Boat Veterans for Truth.

On June 6, 2008, the Department of Justice, in filing a civil forfeiture proceeding against Ward's house, alleged that Ward "made over $500,000 in unauthorized withdrawals" and that he used the money to make his mortgage payments and for home renovation.

The Federal Election Commission (FEC) conducted a probe into disclosure reports submitted by the NRCC during Ward's tenure as treasurer. Guy Harrison, the executive director of NRCC, agreed to pay a $10,000 civil fine and signed a conciliation agreement with the FEC on June 10, 2010.

On December 2, 2010, a federal judge sentenced Ward to 37 months in prison for stealing more than $844,000 from the NRCC and other political fundraising committees for which he worked as treasurer.

== Recent elections ==
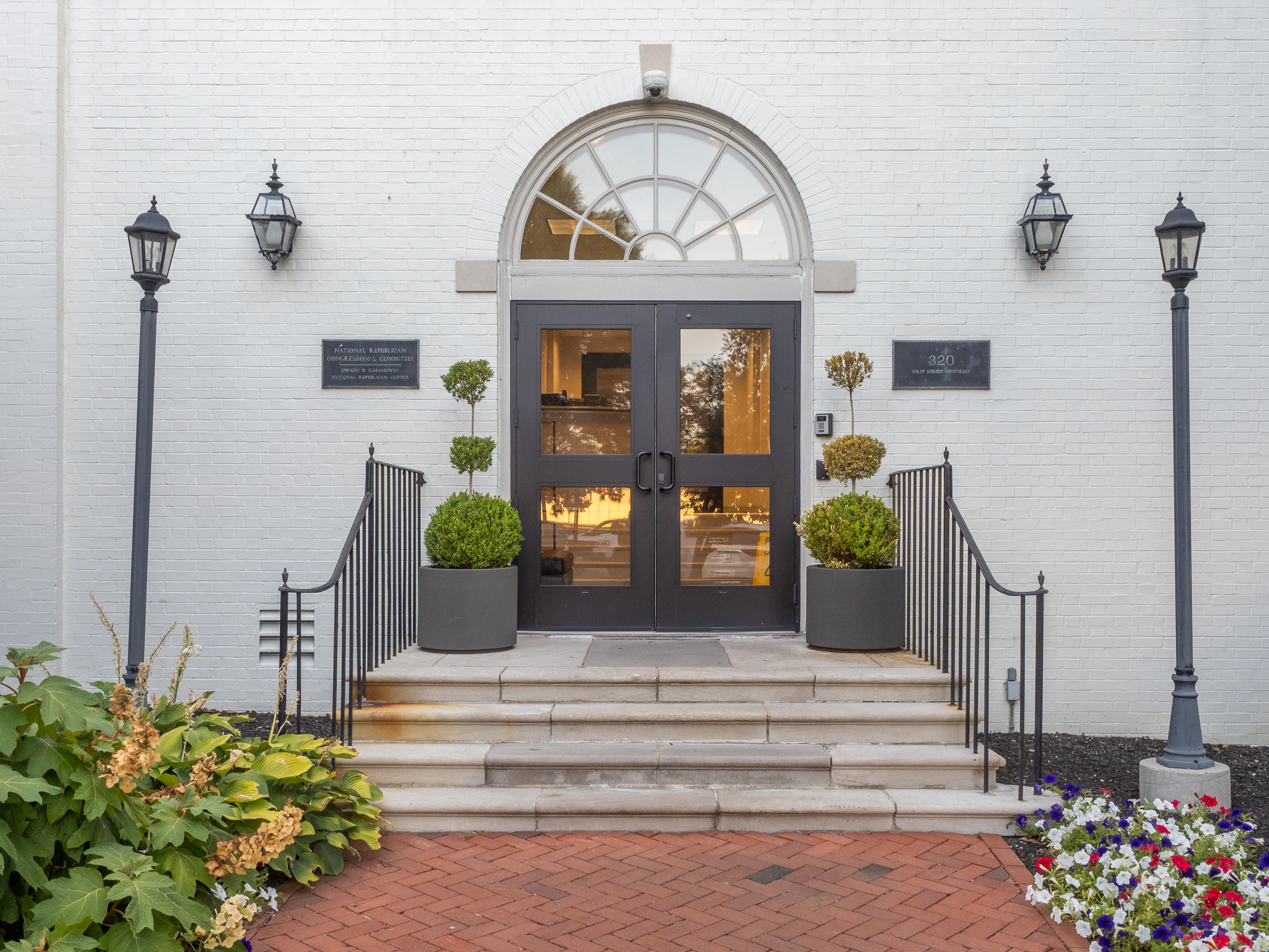
Headquarters (2024)

=== 2008 congressional elections ===
In 2008 the NRCC concentrated on trying to help incumbent Republicans win re-election. Even so, the committee had to make "triage"-type decisions about allocating its funds. In October 2008, it canceled several hundred thousand dollars' worth of television advertising time slated for the re-election campaigns of Michele Bachmann, Marilyn Musgrave, and Tom Feeney, having concluded that they could not win. The decision drew criticism from the conservative Family Research Council, which stated, "It appears that the NRCC is abandoning social conservative candidates and the issues for which they stand…." Bachmann was the only one of those three who was re-elected, winning a plurality of 46% of the vote in a three-way race.

=== 2010 congressional elections ===
In 2010, Republican candidates won a historic number of seats in the House of Representatives. Rep. Sessions and the NRCC staff received praise for harnessing voter sentiment and contributing to Republican gains.

The NRCC raised and spent tens of millions of dollars on independent expenditure advertising. Republicans won in 52 of the 66 seats where the NRCC made those expenditures.

The NRCC made some of its biggest gains in New York, where two incumbents won reelection and five seats flipped from being held by Democrats to being held by Republicans. In Pennsylvania, the committee retained seven incumbents and flipped five seats from being held by Democrats to being held by Republicans. The committee made gains across the midwest, where it won control of both North and South Dakota, and made sizeable gains in Illinois, Wisconsin, and Michigan.

The committee targeted numerous veteran Democrats who held important posts in their party's leadership. The NRCC worked to help GOP candidates defeat committee chairmen John Spratt (Budget), Ike Skelton (Armed Services), and James Oberstar (Transportation and Infrastructure). In each of these cases, Republicans prevailed over the Democrats.

== See also ==
- National Republican Senatorial Committee
- Democratic Congressional Campaign Committee
