= Brandon Herrera =

American YouTuber and political candidate (born 1995)

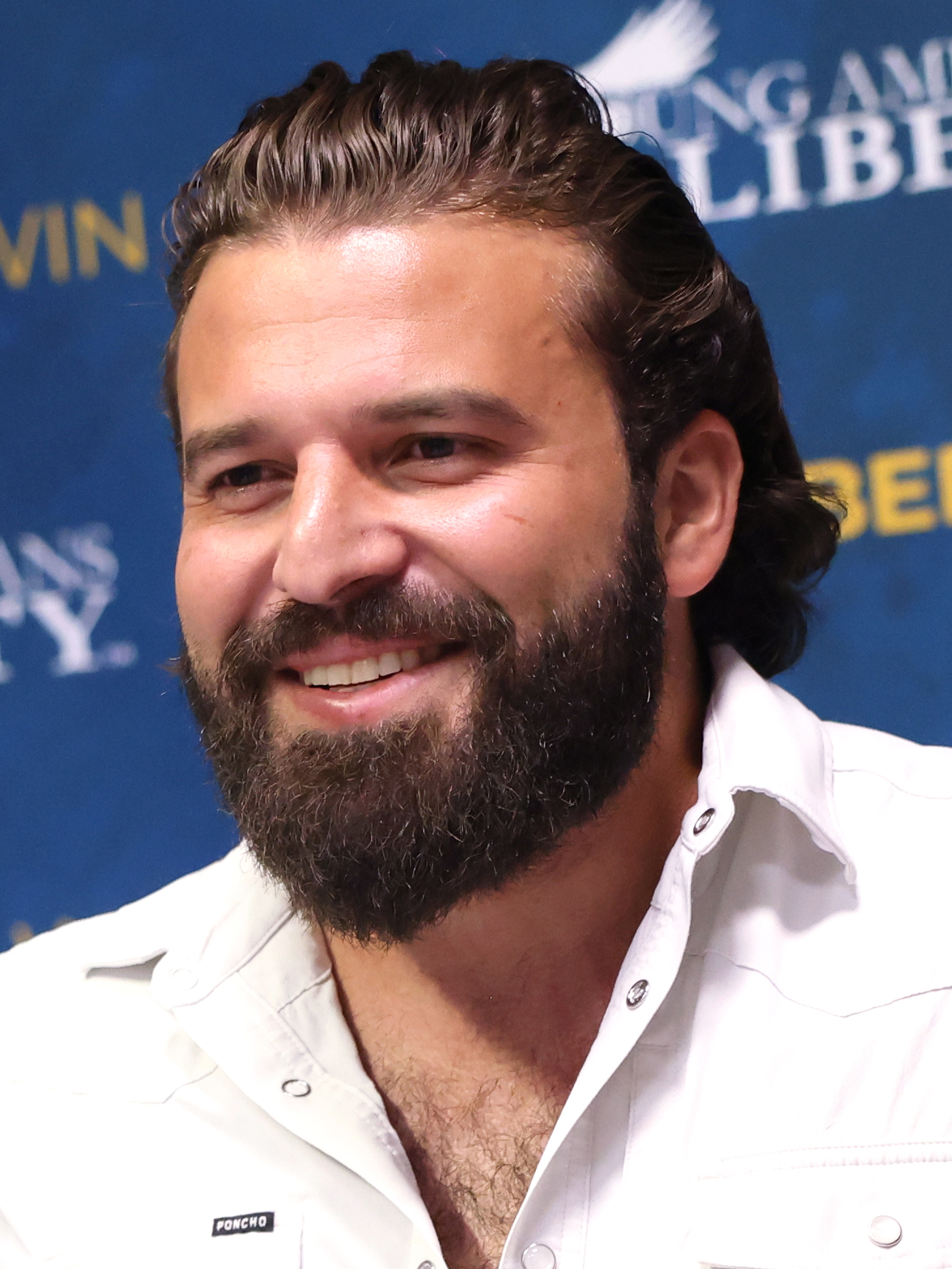
- Herrera in 2026
- Born: Brandon Joseph Herrera; November 20, 1995 (age 30); Fort Bragg, North Carolina, U.S.
- Other name: The AK Guy
- Education: Campbell University (attended)
- Political party: Republican

YouTube information
- Channels: Brandon Herrera; Brandon Herrera - B Side
- Years active: 2014–present
- Genres: Firearms; weaponry
- Subscribers: 4.27 million (main channel)
- Views: 877 million (main channel)
- Last updated: October 13, 2026

Brandon Joseph Herrera (born November 20, 1995), also known as The AK Guy, is an American YouTuber, firearms manufacturer, and political candidate. He is known for his YouTube channel, launched in 2014, which features firearms testing, historical weapon demonstrations, and commentary on gun policy and politics. Herrera is a member of the Republican Party.

In 2024, Herrera ran to represent Texas's 23rd congressional district in the U.S. House of Representatives, challenging incumbent Tony Gonzales in the Republican primary. He narrowly lost by approximately one percentage point in a runoff. He ran again for the seat 2026, forcing another runoff with Gonzales and becoming the Republican nominee after Gonzales withdrew his candidacy due to a scandal. Herrera lost the general election to Democratic nominee Katy Padilla Stout.

== Early life ==
Brandon Herrera was raised in Fayetteville, North Carolina in a military family. He first became interested in firearms as a teenager in middle school. In 2008, at age 12, Herrera became a member of the Sons of Confederate Veterans chapter in Fayetteville. Herrera attended Campbell University, where he studied pre-law, before dropping out to run his firearms manufacturing business.

== Career ==
=== YouTube ===
Started in 2014, Herrera's YouTube channel focuses on testing and reviewing firearms. Subjects of his videos have included tests of antique and military weapons such as the AK-47 and RPG-7, discussions about gun laws and politics, and a series recreating the assassinations of public figures, including John F. Kennedy, Martin Luther King Jr, and Abraham Lincoln. His videos often feature guests who have served in the military. He moved to Texas in 2020.

On October 16, 2022, Herrera collaborated with Kyle Rittenhouse in Rittenhouse's first ever YouTube video after Rittenhouse launched his own channel dedicated to guns and Second Amendment rights.

In 2024, Herrera released a rifle he and his team engineered called the AK-50, an AK-47 pattern rifle chambered in .50 BMG in order to blend the durability and power of the two separately. The gun was later added to the video game Escape from Tarkov (2025).

In the aftermath of the Annunciation Catholic Church shooting, an alleged manifesto by the perpetrator referenced Herrera, stating the two had met at SHOT Show. Herrera harshly condemned the shooting and perpetrator, stating that he and his friends who attended SHOT show have "zero recollection of ever meeting this creep". The National Shooting Sports Foundation, the organizers of SHOT show, released a statement in which they detailed there is no record or evidence the shooter ever attended any year of the event.

=== Politics ===
On March 19, 2024, Herrera spoke outside of the Colorado State Capitol to around 400 people and later testified inside to the Colorado Legislature against a proposed assault weapons ban.

Herrera has described himself as libertarian-leaning, often emphasizing gun rights and limited government, but has generally aligned himself with right-wing populists such as Jim Jordan and Matt Gaetz. He also has appealed to anti-establishment voters in the primaries.

==== 2024 congressional election ====
2024 GOP primary runoff results by county: Gonzales: 50–60% Gonzales; 60–70% Gonzales; Herrera: 50–60% Herrera; 60–70% Herrera; 70–80% Herrera; 80–90% Herrera

In August 2023, Herrera, a Republican, announced he would run for the U.S. House to represent Texas's 23rd congressional district in 2024, citing a frustration in incumbent Tony Gonzales' votes and gun policy. In the primary, Herrera received 25 percent of the vote, while Gonzales received 45 percent; as no candidate received more than 50 percent, a runoff was held between the two, where Herrera lost by 354 votes. Herrera called for a recount, saying, "I don't expect the results to change, but I feel I owe it to my volunteers, voters, and supporters to leave no stone unturned."

Several political action committees from outside of Texas donated millions of dollars to Gonzales' campaign against Herrera. The pro-Israel lobbying group AIPAC ran an ad campaign accusing Herrera of joking about veteran suicide and having "glorified Nazis and mocked the Holocaust" in his YouTube videos. A Politico article cited this ad campaign as an example of AIPAC strategically attacking certain candidates while supporting its endorsed ones, without mentioning Israel. After the primary, U.S. Term Limits, a congressional term limits advocacy group, tapped Herrera to be their Texas chair. Herrera criticized AIPAC after it spent over US$1 million against him, calling it "Israel first bullshit" and saying, "I'm anti Israel buying American elections."

==== 2026 congressional election ====
Herrera again announced his candidacy for the Republican nomination in Texas's 23rd Congressional district in 2026. In November 2025, Herrera announced his campaign had raised $1.1 million dollars for the primary, with over 33,000 small dollar donors contributing alongside his own PACs. He solicited campaign donations through his YouTube channel and ran raffles for collector's items. His campaign slogan was "Let's Go Brandon". On February 18, 2026, Herrera called on Gonzales to exit the race and resign over an alleged affair with a former staffer who committed suicide in November after another former Gonzales staffer backed the rumors.

During the March 3, 2026, primary, Herrera forced Gonzales into a runoff, this time coming in first with 43% to Gonzales's 41%. Gonzales suspended his campaign two days after the primary, leaving Herrera the presumptive nominee.

On November 4, 2026, Herrera was defeated by Democratic nominee Katy Padilla Stout.

== Electoral history ==
=== 2024 ===
2024 United States House of Representatives election, District 23 (primary)
| Party | Candidate | Votes | % |
|---|---|---|---|
| Republican | Tony Gonzales (incumbent) | 25,988 | 45.1 |
| Republican | Brandon Herrera | 14,201 | 24.6 |
| Republican | Julie Clark | 7,994 | 13.9 |
| Republican | Frank Lopez Jr. | 6,266 | 10.9 |
| Republican | Victor Avila | 3,181 | 5.5 |
| Total votes | | 57,630 | 100.0 |

2024 United States House of Representatives election, District 23 (primary runoff)
| Party | Candidate | Votes | % |
|---|---|---|---|
| Republican | Tony Gonzales (incumbent) | 15,023 | 50.6 |
| Republican | Brandon Herrera | 14,669 | 49.4 |
| Total votes | | 29,692 | 100.0 |

=== 2026 ===
2026 United States House of Representatives election, District 23 (primary)
| Party | Candidate | Votes | % |
|---|---|---|---|
| Republican | Brandon Herrera | 23,857 | 43.3 |
| Republican | Tony Gonzales (incumbent) | 22,979 | 41.7 |
| Republican | Keith Barton | 4,672 | 8.5 |
| Republican | Quico Canseco | 3,554 | 6.5 |
| Total votes | | 55,062 | 100 |

2026 United States House of Representatives election, District 23
| Party | Candidate | Votes | % |
|---|---|---|---|
| Democratic | Katy Padilla Stout | 142,032 | 52.1 |
| Republican | Brandon Herrera | 119,795 | 44.0 |
| Independent | Ben Mendoza | 10,610 | 3.9 |
| Total votes | | 259,280 | 100.0 |

== Public image ==
Herrera's content contains what he has described as "dark humor". He co-hosts the podcast Unsubscribe (with three military veterans) that was described by the Houston Chronicle as displaying "offensive commentary or repeats racist stereotypes", such as an episode where he joked he was essentially a military veteran because he "often [thought] about putting a gun in [his] mouth". Herrera's comments have drawn criticism from Tony Gonzales, Herrera's primary opponent for Texas's 23rd congressional district. Herrera has attributed the remark to dark humor made during a discussion related to veteran suicide prevention, an issue the podcast has brought attention to and fund raised on behalf of. In the October 2026 debate with Democratic opponent Katy Padilla Stout, he declined to comment on the clip and described veteran suicide as an "epidemic", proposing expansion of Tricare and the VA's Community Care program to support rural veterans in his district. Herrera was projected to lose the general election to Padilla Stout on November 3, 2026.

The Brandon Herrera YouTube channel features videos showcasing and testing firearms in historically themed reenactments. Herrera, best known for his Second Amendment advocacy, has published videos reviewing Nazi-era weapons and recreated Hitler's suicide in his work as a historical firearms educator, among other instructional videos.

Reviewing his 1939 edition of Mein Kampf, Herrera said Hitler was a "schizophrenic", whose ideas were "all over the fucking place", while also clarifying that his ownership of the book does not mean he agrees with its contents. Herrera described his 2023 video "recreating" the assassination of Martin Luther King Jr. as an attempt to combine a serious topic with dark, edgy humor. Herrera has also previously published videos covering the assassinations of famous people or political figures, such as John F. Kennedy and Shinzo Abe. Another video, covering historical weapons in the Rhodesian Bush War, featured the flag of Rhodesia. Herrera responded to criticism, saying, "This should be obvious, but I am not, nor have I ever been a neo-Nazi." The Republican Jewish Coalition stated its opposition to Herrera.

Herrera is a professional firearms historian, and has made statements of support for the Sons of Confederate Veterans organization in his videos, citing the need to preserve history, "because those who do not learn from history are doomed to repeat it."

Herrera has been an aggressive critic of Shannon Watts, the founder of Moms Demand Action, arguing that "[j]ust because you let somebody creampie you doesn't mean I have to give a shit about your political opinions. The fact that you kept your cum trophy doesn't make you any less wrong about the dumb shit that you say."
