= Dudley Harrison =

American politician

Member of the Texas House of Representatives from the 68th district
- In office January 11, 1983 – January 8, 1991
- Preceded by: Tom Craddick
- Succeeded by: Pete Gallego

Personal details
- Born: Stillman Dudley Harrison; September 4, 1929 San Antonio, Texas
- Died: November 25, 2006 (aged 77) Sanderson, Texas
- Party: Democratic

Dudley Harrison (September 4, 1929 – November 25, 2006) was an American politician who served in the Texas House of Representatives from the 68th district from 1983 to 1991.

He died of cancer on November 25, 2006, in Sanderson, Texas at age 77.
