= Poncho Nevárez =

American politician

Member of the Texas House of Representatives from the 74th district
- In office January 8, 2013 – January 12, 2021
- Preceded by: Pete Gallego
- Succeeded by: Eddie Morales

Personal details
- Born: September 1, 1972 (age 54) Eagle Pass, Texas
- Party: Democratic
- Spouse: Rossy
- Education: University of Texas; St. Mary's University School of Law (JD)
- Occupation: Attorney
- Website: www.ponchonevarez.com

Alfonso "Poncho" Nevárez Jr. is a former Democratic member of the Texas House of Representatives. First elected in 2012, Nevárez announced in November 2019 that he would not seek re-election in 2020. This decision was ultimately connected to his arrest for cocaine possession later that month.

== Texas House of Representatives ==
Nevárez ran for and won the seat after longtime Democratic incumbent Pete Gallego left the office to make a successful run for the United States House of Representatives.

In May 2017, Republican state representative Matt Rinaldi called Immigrations and Customs Enforcement (ICE) officers on protesters holding signs claiming to be illegal immigrants at the state capitol. After calling ICE, Rinaldi said that Nevárez "threatened my life on the House floor." Nevárez said that he put his hands on Rinaldi and told him to take his argument outside the House chamber, but denied threatening Rinaldi’s life.

At the end of the 86th Texas legislative session in 2019, Texas Monthly included Nevárez on its 2019 "Worst Legislators" list. The magazine cited, among other reasons for the negative recognition, "Nevárez had used his own bill to try to turn a favor for a politically influential company that operates a radioactive waste dump in West Texas—a dump that’s not even in his district."

In November 2019, Nevárez announced he would not be seeking re-election in 2020.

Nevárez chaired the Border Security and Public Safety Committee, which oversaw the law enforcement agencies that were investigating him.

== Cocaine possession charges ==
Surveillance footage showed Nevárez dropping an envelope stuffed with cocaine as he was leaving Austin–Bergstrom International Airport in September 2019. Nevárez confirmed the cocaine was his and that the incident was the reason he was not seeking re-election. A warrant was issued for his arrest on felony drug possession charges. On November 15, Nevárez turned himself in to authorities, and was released after posting a $10,000 bond.

== Personal life ==
Born in Eagle Pass, Texas, he is the son of Alfonso Nevárez Sr. and Guillermina Castillon. Nevárez was the first member of his family to graduate from college. In 1999, Nevárez graduated from St. Mary's University School of Law.

Texas House of Representatives
Preceded by Pete Gallego	Member of the Texas House of Representatives from the 74th district 2013–2021	Succeeded by Eddie Morales
