= Katy Padilla Stout =

American attorney and politician (born 1985/1986)

- Padilla Stout in 2026

Member-elect of the U.S. House of Representatives from Texas's 23rd district
- Assuming office January 3, 2027
- Succeeding: Tony Gonzales

Personal details
- Born: Katy Zoe Padilla; 1985 or 1986 (age 40–41) San Antonio, Texas, U.S.
- Party: Democratic
- Spouse: Austin Stout
- Children: 4
- Education: University of Texas, Austin (BS); South Texas College of Law (JD)
- Website: Campaign website

Katy Padilla Stout (born 1985/1986) is an American attorney and politician who is the U.S. Representative-elect for Texas's 23rd congressional district. She is a member of the Democratic Party and was elected in the 2026 election.

== Early life and education ==
Padilla Stout was born and raised in San Antonio, Texas. She attended North East Independent School District schools and graduated from Lee High School in 2003. She earned a Bachelor of Science in education from the University of Texas at Austin. She later obtained a Juris Doctor from South Texas College of Law.

== Career ==
Padilla Stout began her career as an elementary school teacher in Northside Independent School District. As a teacher, she worked in English as a Second Language (ESL), special education, and gifted and talented programs. Her experience working with refugee students influenced her decision to pursue a legal career. After earning her law degree, she became an attorney representing children in the foster care system. She has served on the Bexar County Child Welfare Board.

== Political career ==
Padilla Stout ran for the United States House of Representatives in Texas's 23rd congressional district in 2026 as a Democrat. She won a multi-candidate Democratic primary to become her party's nominee. Her campaign has emphasized issues affecting working families, rural communities, and border regions. She defeated Republican nominee Brandon Herrera in the general election.

Upon her election, Katy Padilla Stout became the first Congresswoman and first Latina Congresswoman to represent any part of San Antonio.

== Personal life ==
Padilla Stout lives in the Greater San Antonio area. She is married and has four children.

U.S. House of Representatives
Preceded by Tony Gonzales	Member of the U.S. House of Representatives from Texas's 23rd congressional district Taking office 2027	Elect
