= Christopher J. Ward =

American politician

Christopher J. Ward is a former treasurer of the National Republican Congressional Committee (NRCC) and several other Republican campaigns. He was accused of embezzling $724,000 from the NRCC since his appointment in 2003, according to statements from the organization. The theft was investigated by the Federal Bureau of Investigation. Ward had also served as treasurer for 83 Republican committees.

On June 6, 2008, the Department of Justice, in filing a civil forfeiture proceeding against Ward's house, alleged that Ward "made over $500,000 in unauthorized withdrawals" and that he used the money to make his mortgage payments and for home renovation on his home in Bethesda, Maryland.

On December 2, 2010, a federal judge sentenced Ward to 37 months in prison for stealing more than $844,000 from the NRCC and other political fundraising committees for whom he worked as treasurer.
