= Pete Gallego =

American politician (born 1961)

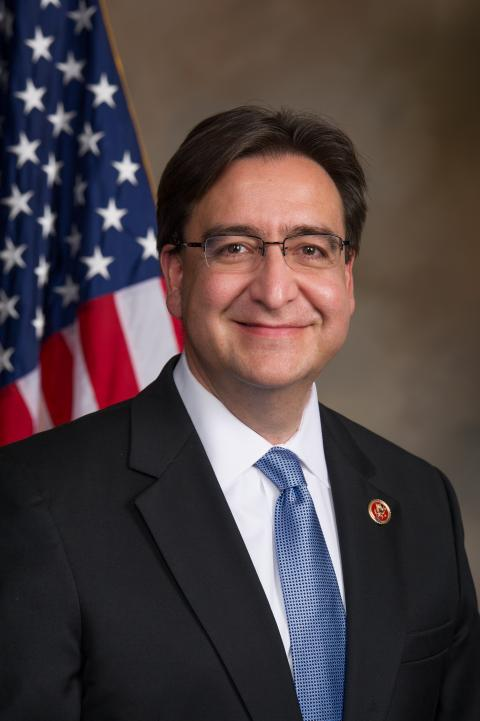
- Official portrait, 2013

Member of the U.S. House of Representatives from Texas's 23rd district
- In office January 3, 2013 – January 3, 2015
- Preceded by: Quico Canseco
- Succeeded by: Will Hurd

Member of the Texas House of Representatives
- In office January 8, 1991 – January 3, 2013
- Preceded by: Dudley Harrison
- Succeeded by: Poncho Nevárez
- Constituency: 68th district (1991–1993); 74th district (1993–2013)

Personal details
- Born: Pete Peña Gallego; December 2, 1961 (age 64) Alpine, Texas, U.S.
- Party: Democratic
- Spouse: Maria Ramon
- Education: Sul Ross State University (BA); University of Texas, Austin (JD)

Pete Peña Gallego (born December 2, 1961) is an American lawyer, politician, and higher education leader who served as the U.S. representative for Texas's 23rd congressional district from 2013 to 2015. A member of the Democratic Party, he previously served as a member of the Texas House of Representatives from the 68th district (74th district from 1993) beginning in 1991. He was president of his alma mater, Sul Ross State University in Far West Texas, from 2020 through 2022 and continues to serve as president emeritus as he writes and speaks on issues related to college accessibility and affordability, particularly for first-generation students.

Gallego defeated freshman incumbent Quico Canseco of San Antonio for Texas's 23rd congressional district seat in the November 6, 2012, general election. Gallego ran for re-election in 2014, in what the Texas Tribune called the "only obviously competitive November congressional race" in Texas. He was defeated by challenger Republican Will Hurd on November 4, 2014. In 2016 he ran for Congress once more in the 23rd district, losing to Hurd a second time.

== Early career ==
After graduating from law school, Gallego became an assistant in the office of the state attorney general, before he returned to his hometown of Alpine to become a prosecutor. He was also an attorney at the law firm Brown McCarroll LLP, with an office in Austin.

== State legislature ==
Elected to the Texas House from District 74 in 1990, Gallego was the first Hispanic to represent this vast border district. In 1991, he became the first freshman member and the first ethnic minority member ever elected as chair of the House Democratic Caucus, a post he held until January 2001.

In the Texas House, Gallego served on the board of directors of the National Association of Latino Elected Officials (NALEO), and four terms as Chairman of the Mexican American Legislative Caucus (MALC), a caucus of Texas representatives who are of Mexican-American descent or who serve a significant Mexican-American constituency. In 2008, Trey Martinez Fischer replaced Gallego as Chairman of MALC.

Gallego's state legislative career included chairmanships of the General Investigating Committee, the Committee on Criminal Jurisprudence, and several select committees. He also served as a member of the Texas Sunset Commission and a member of the Committees on Appropriations, Calendars, Criminal Jurisprudence, Higher Education, and Elections and served on the 10-member House-Senate budget conference committee for five consecutive legislative sessions from 1993 – 2001.

In 2008, Gallego narrowly missed being elected Speaker of the Texas House.

Gallego was known for carrying major legislation in the areas of criminal justice, indigent defense, capital punishment, wrongful convictions, crime victims’ rights, the judiciary, and economic development. He also carried legislation authorizing the creation of underground water districts throughout the region he represented.

Gallego established internship programs at MALC named in honor of several of his mentors, Rep. Irma Rangel (the first Latina elected to the Texas Legislature) and Rep. Paul Moreno, the longest-serving Latino elected official in the country at that time. He, along with the Latino Caucus chairs in New York, Florida, and California, was also instrumental in founding the National Board of Hispanic Caucus Chairs, of which he was the founding chairman. While a state legislator, he also became the first person of color to serve as president and chairman of the Texas Lyceum Association.

== U.S. House of Representatives ==
=== Elections ===
2012

Gallego announced his candidacy for the 23rd district in September 2011. His state house district was virtually coextensive with the central portion of the congressional district; indeed, he had represented almost all of the central portion of the congressional district at one time or another during his two decades in the state legislature.

He finished second in the Democratic primary, behind former congressman Ciro Rodriguez, who had received Bill Clinton's endorsement. He then defeated Rodriguez in the July 31 runoff election by 2,777 votes. During the course of his campaign, Gallego overhauled his campaign staff four times.

In the general election, Gallego defeated Canseco by 9,129 votes. While Gallego lost in Bexar County, home to more than half the district's population, he dominated his former state house district. The campaign between Gallego and Canseco was contentious, with Gallego alleging that Canseco was a "right-wing extremist," and Canseco calling Gallego a "radical environmentalist."

Gallego was supported by the Blue Dog Coalition.

2014

Gallego ran for re-election in 2014. Facing no opposition from his own party, he won the Democratic primary on March 4, 2014. He faced Republican Will Hurd, an African American, in the general election. Gallego was a member of the Democratic Congressional Campaign Committee's Frontline Program. The program is designed to help protect vulnerable Democratic incumbents. He lost his bid for re-election to Hurd by 2,422 votes.

2016

Gallego attempted to reclaim his seat in 2016, he won the Democratic nomination but on November 8th 2016 he again lost to Hurd, this time by 3,051 Votes. Despite Hillary Clinton narrowly flipping the district in the concurrent 2016 presidential election.

2018

In July 2017, Gallego tested the waters as a potential 2018 candidate once more against Hurd. Reapportionment of the district could play a major role as to whether Gallego decided to enter the race. At least two other Democrats also considered running for their party nomination: Judith Canales, a former officer of the United States Department of Housing and Urban Development from Eagle Pass, and Jay Hulings, a graduate of Harvard Law School and an assistant U.S. attorney in San Antonio. On September 1, Gallego announced that he would not run in the 23rd district.

=== Committee assignments ===
- Committee on Agriculture
  - Subcommittee on General Farm Commodities and Risk Management
  - Subcommittee on Livestock, Rural Development, and Credit
- Committee on Armed Services
  - Subcommittee on Tactical Air and Land Forces
  - Subcommittee on Readiness

== Texas State Senate ==
In June 2018, a special election was triggered in Texas State Senate District 19 after incumbent Carlos Uresti resigned. After an initial eight-way race and election on July 31, in which no candidate received 50% of the vote, a runoff election was set between the top two candidates, Gallego and Republican Pete Flores. On September 18, Gallego was defeated in the runoff election due to high voter turnout in Medina County, a GOP stronghold; Flores received 53% of the vote, while Gallego received 47%.

== Sul Ross State ==
In May 2020 Chancellor Brian McCall announced Gallego as the sole finalist to become the 13th president of Sul Ross State (SRSU). In June, the Texas State University System Board of Regents confirmed him as the first SRSU alum to serve as president. He began his presidency at the four-campus university at the height of the COVID-19 pandemic as it faced declining enrollment.

During his tenure, the university successfully moved classes online and slowly transitioned back to partial in-person classes. The university's endowment grew in size, and it awarded more degrees per year, including to Hispanic, minority, and economically-disadvantaged students, while raising its graduation rates. A member of its rodeo team won a national championship (bull riding) for the first time since 1983.

Gallego resigned as president in June 2022 and was named president emeritus by the Board of Regents.

== Political positions ==
=== Healthcare ===
Gallego opposes repeal of the Affordable Care Act and voted against repeal in May 2013. Gallego's support for the Affordable Care Act was attacked in advertisements by The LIBRE Initiative, a conservative Hispanic outreach group.

Gallego opposed a Medicare voucher system and supported Medicaid expansion and prescription drug negotiations.

=== Abortion ===
Gallego supported an abortion law allowing minors to get an abortion with parental consent. Under the legislation a minor would have been able to bypass the requirement for parental consent by petitioning a judge.

=== Immigration ===
Gallego has said that border security and immigration reform are two separate issues. He advocates improved "worker accountability programs, using border security as an economic tool and aiding the current 11 million undocumented individuals in a path to citizenship", writing with several others in an opinion piece in the El Paso Times that, "We can no longer delay immigration reform. The time to move forward is now." Gallego has said "Most people don't really care where the idea comes from. They want action, they want something to happen, and they're tired of the prolonged conversation." Gallego has expressed support for President Obama's immigration policies. He supports the DREAM Act.

In 2014, Gallego invited Speaker of the House John Boehner to the Southern Border to view the humanitarian crisis and discuss the matter with local border patrol agents and community members.

=== Energy ===
Gallego has been supported by the Sierra Club and the League of Conservation Voters. According to Texas Climate News, Gallego's 2012 congressional victory "earned the celebratory attention of climate-action advocates." Gallego has voiced support for renewable and clean energy sources. The Sierra Club called Gallego a "clean energy champion." Mother Jones included Gallego in a list of the "Top Five Climate Hawks" who were elected to office in November 2012.

== Personal life ==
Born in Alpine, Gallego’s family operated a well-known local restaurant which was a political watering hole. For a time, he worked in a local clothing store, he served as a radio disc jockey and newscaster, and worked in a local clothing store. He also worked as a student employee in the financial aid office. He graduated from Sul Ross State University in 1982 with a bachelor's degree in political science. In 1985, he earned a J.D. from the University of Texas School of Law in Austin.

Gallego has been honored through the naming of multiple buildings, including the Pete P. Gallego Center at Sul Ross State in 2001.

He and his wife have one son, who attends The University of Texas at Austin. He currently works with the Bexar County District Attorney’s office.

Gallego is a frequent guest columnist in such publications as the Dallas Morning News, Houston Chronicle, San Antonio Express-News, and Inside Higher Ed.

== See also ==
- Hispanics in the United States
- Mexican-Americans
- List of Hispanic and Latino Americans in the United States Congress

U.S. House of Representatives
Preceded by Quico Canseco	Member of the U.S. House of Representatives from Texas's 23rd congressional district 2013–2015	Succeeded by Will Hurd
U.S. order of precedence (ceremonial)
Preceded by Quico Canseco as Former U.S. Representative	Order of precedence of the United States as Former U.S. Representative	Succeeded by Abby Finkenauer as Former U.S. Representative
