= Eddie Morales =

American politician (born 1975)

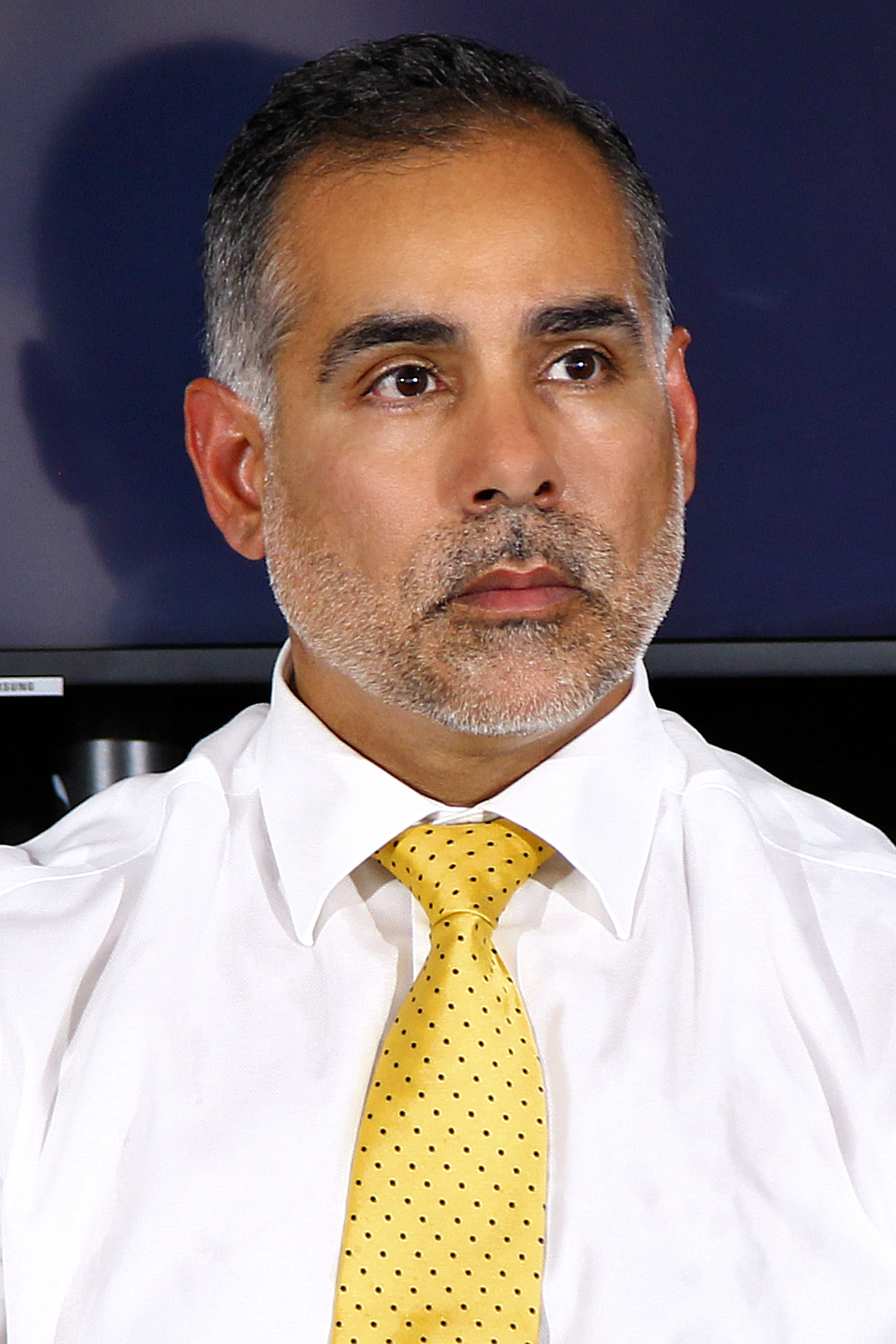

Member of the Texas House of Representatives from the 74th district
- Incumbent
- Assumed office January 12, 2021
- Preceded by: Poncho Nevárez

Personal details
- Born: Heriberto Morales Jr. January 24, 1975 (age 51) Piedras Negras, Mexico
- Party: Democratic
- Spouse: Hellen Martinez
- Children: 3
- Education: University of Texas, Austin (BA); St. Mary's University, Texas (JD)
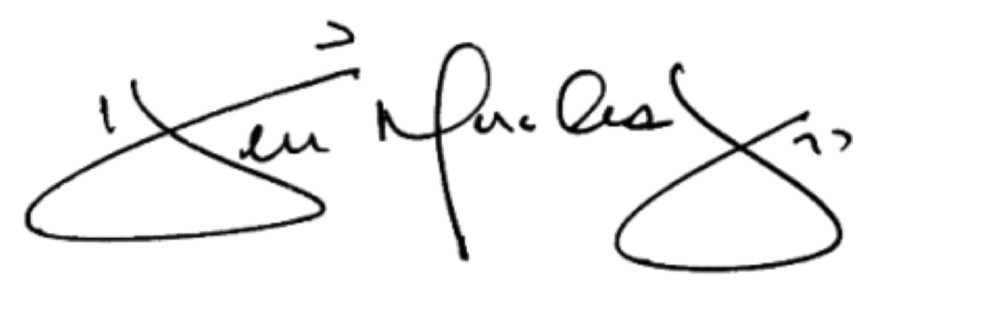
- Signature
- Website: Campaign website

Heriberto "Eddie" Morales Jr. (born January 24, 1975) is an American politician. A Democrat, he is member of the Texas House of Representatives. He is an attorney and has represented the 74th District since 2021. District 74 includes 770 miles of the U.S.-Mexico border encompassing 11 counties ranging from Maverick County to El Paso County. These include Maverick, Kinney, Val Verde, Terrell, Brewster, Presidio, Jeff Davis, Reeves, Culberson, Hudspeth, and El Paso Counties. Cities within the district include Eagle Pass, Del Rio, Alpine, Marfa, Pecos, and east El Paso.

== Early life, education, and career ==
Morales was born on January 24 1975, in Piedras Negras, Coahuila, Mexico. He graduated from Eagle Pass High School in Eagle Pass, Texas in 1993. He subsequently attended the University of Texas at Austin, where he received a BA in Political Science and a double minor in Business and Spanish in 1997. Morales later earned his Juris Doctor from St. Mary's University School of Law in 2000.

Since then, Morales has worked for Langley & Bannack in Eagle Pass, where he is currently a partner and member of the management board. He previously served as president of the Maverick County Bar Association and is a City Attorney for the cities of Eagle Pass and Brackettville. He is the owner of his family's tortilla factory business, Piedras Negras Tortilla Factory in Eagle Pass, where he has worked since high school.

== Texas House of Representatives ==
In November 2019, Morales announced to run as a Democrat for the Texas House of Representatives. He ran for the 74th district, which was held by Poncho Nevárez at the time. In late 2019, Nevárez announced he would not seek re-election for the 87th legislature.

Morales was appointed in 2023 by Speaker of the House Dade Phelan – and again in 2025 by Speaker Dustin Burrows, to vice chairman of the House Committee on Energy and Resources.

== Legislative Committees ==
Morales is currently serving as a member of the following committees:

- Energy Resources, Vice Chair
- Transportation, Member

== Election History ==
=== 2020 ===
Texas General Election 2020: House District 74
Party	Candidate	Votes	%	±%
Democratic	Eddie Morales Jr.	26,131	53.9	0.00
Republican	Ruben Falcon	22,334	46.1	0.00

=== 2022 ===
Texas General Election 2022: House District 74
Party	Candidate	Votes	%	±%
Democratic	Eddie Morales Jr.	21,112	55.7	+1.8
Republican	Katherine Parker	16,813	44.3	0.00

=== 2024 ===
Texas General Election 2024: House District 74
Party	Candidate	Votes	%	±%
Democratic	Eddie Morales Jr.	28,203	51.7	−4.0
Republican	Robert Garza	26,378	48.3	0.00

== Political positions ==
=== Border security ===
Morales supports legal immigration, expanding worker visa permits and bracero-type visas for farming and agriculture. He is also in favor of a controlled and secured border using a combination of manpower, advanced border security technology and a physical border.

=== Healthcare ===
Morales supports expanding Medicaid, so that all receive quality and affordable healthcare. Three counties within the district have zero physicians servicing their communities. Morales is also an advocate for mental health resources for West and South Texas.

=== Transportation ===
Morales supports more funding in his district for transportation, as he believes roadway access between communities through a modernized roadway is essential for the safety of our citizens and the growth of communities. He states that cities and counties in the district cannot afford significant infrastructure investments.
