= Texas's 74th House of Representatives district =

American legislative district

Texas's 74th State House of Representatives district
Representative
Eddie Morales Jr. D–Eagle Pass
- Demographics: 13.9% White; 2.7% Black; 81.6% Hispanic; 1.4% Asian
- Population (2020) • Voting age: 203,239; 157,622

The 74th district of the Texas House of Representatives consists of a small part of El Paso County, as well as the entirety of the following counties: Brewster, Culberson, Hudspeth, Jeff Davis, Kinney, Maverick, Presidio, Reeves, Terrell, and Val Verde. The current representative is Eddie Morales Jr., who has represented the district since 2021.
