= Will Hurd =

American politician (born 1977)

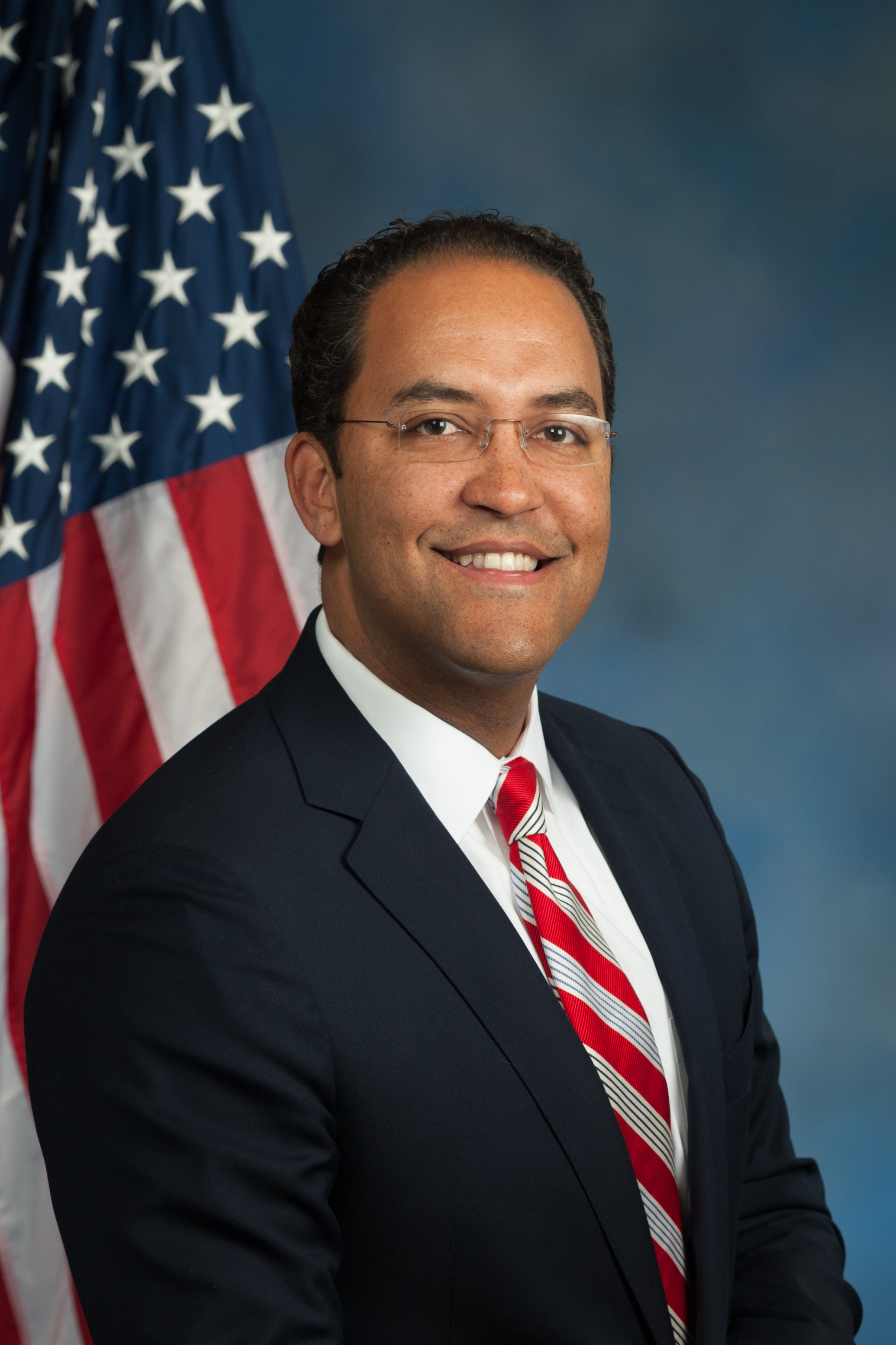
- Official portrait, 2014

Member of the U.S. House of Representatives from Texas's 23rd district
- In office January 3, 2015 – January 3, 2021
- Preceded by: Pete Gallego
- Succeeded by: Tony Gonzales

Personal details
- Born: William Ballard Hurd; August 19, 1977 (age 48) San Antonio, Texas, U.S.
- Party: Republican
- Spouse: Lynlie Wallace (m. 2022)
- Education: Texas A&M University (BS)
- Website: Official website
- Hurd's voice Hurd on National Library Week. Recorded April 12, 2018

William Ballard Hurd (born August 19, 1977) is an American politician and former CIA clandestine officer who served as the U.S. representative for Texas's 23rd congressional district from 2015 to 2021.

Following a nine-year stint with the CIA, Hurd ran for Congress in 2010 and was defeated in a runoff primary. Hurd ran for Congress again in 2014 and was successful. The district stretched approximately 550 miles (890 km) from San Antonio to El Paso along the U.S.-Mexican border. He was re-elected in 2016 and again in 2018, but did not seek re-election in 2020.

On June 22, 2023, Hurd announced that he was seeking the Republican nomination for president of the United States in the 2024 election. He dropped out of the race on October 9, 2023, and endorsed Nikki Haley.

== Early life and education ==
Hurd was born on August 19, 1977, in San Antonio, Texas. He is the son of Mary Alice Hurd and Robert Hurd. He has a brother, Chuck, and a sister, Elizabeth. His father is black and his mother is white.

Hurd is a graduate of John Marshall High School in Leon Valley, Texas, and a graduate of Texas A&M University, where he was elected student body president. Hurd was student body president during the 1999 Aggie Bonfire collapse. He majored in computer science and minored in international relations.

== Intelligence career ==
Hurd worked for the Central Intelligence Agency (CIA) for nine years, from 2000 to 2009. He was stationed primarily in Washington, D.C., but his tour of duty included being an operations officer in Afghanistan, Pakistan, and India. He speaks Urdu, the national language and lingua franca of Pakistan, where he worked undercover. One of his roles at the CIA was briefing members of Congress, which is what made Hurd want to pursue politics. He returned to Texas after his CIA service and worked as a partner with Crumpton Group LLC, a strategic advisory firm, and as a senior adviser with FusionX, a cybersecurity firm.

== U.S. House of Representatives ==
=== Elections ===
==== 2010 ====
On November 19, 2009, Hurd announced his candidacy for the Republican nomination in Texas's 23rd congressional district, a district that is two-thirds Hispanic. His electronically filed campaign finance records indicated he had $70,000 on hand to fund his campaign.

On February 15, 2010, the San Antonio Express-News endorsed Hurd. In the March 2 primary election he received the most votes, but not a majority, resulting in a runoff election on April 13, 2010. Hurd faced the second-place finisher, Francisco "Quico" Canseco, a San Antonio banker who was making his third bid for Congress. Canseco defeated Hurd in the runoff, 53% to 47%. Canseco won the general election against two-term incumbent Democrat Ciro Rodriguez, but lost reelection in 2012 to Alpine Democrat Pete Gallego by a margin of 2,500 votes.

==== 2014 ====
Hurd once again ran for the 23rd district in the 2014 United States House of Representatives elections. After a runoff, he won the primary over Canseco. In the general election, Hurd defeated Gallego, making this the third consecutive election cycle in the district in which an incumbent was unseated. The San Antonio Express-News again endorsed Hurd. Even though Republican presidential nominee Mitt Romney had carried the district two years earlier, the result was considered an upset. Hurd conducted a post-election swing through some parts of his district that had heavily supported Gallego. He was also the only candidate ever to be endorsed by former CIA director and Defense Secretary Robert Gates, who admired Hurd's work at the CIA and was disappointed by his departure to run for public office. Gates said that Hurd "has the character and the integrity and the leadership skills for higher office".

==== 2016 ====
Hurd was renominated for a second term in the Republican primary election held on March 1, 2016, in which he defeated William Peterson, with 39,762 votes (82.2%) to 8,590 (17.8%). Former Congressman Pete Gallego was his opponent again and the race was expected to be one of the most competitive in the country. After the primary, Hurd distanced himself from Republican presidential candidate Donald Trump. He criticized Trump's "nasty rhetoric" about Muslims and Latinos and his proposal to build an $8 billion, 1,000-mile-long (1,600 km) wall across the American border with Mexico. Hurd described the proposal as "the most expensive, least effective way to do border security". He stated that he did not need to associate himself with Trump to succeed.

During the campaign, Gallego attempted to tie Hurd to Trump, who was considered unpopular with Texas Hispanics. After the Access Hollywood tape was released, Hurd affirmed that he would not endorse or vote for Trump, based on Trump's behavior toward women and minorities. Hurd claimed that Gallego had been insufficiently aggressive in support for veteran issues and was largely a tool of Nancy Pelosi, at that time the House minority leader.

In the general election Hurd defeated Gallego, 110,577 votes (48.3%) to 107,526 (47%), with Libertarian Ruben Schmidt Corvalan of San Antonio earning the remaining 10,862 (4.7%). Hurd ran sufficiently well in the Bexar County portion of the district and in nearby Medina and Uvalde counties to offset Gallego's large margins in El Paso and Maverick counties, the latter of which encompasses the border city of Eagle Pass.

==== 2018 ====
On March 7, 2018, Hurd won the GOP primary with 80% of the vote. No candidate won a majority of the vote in the Democratic primary in his district, forcing a runoff between former Air Force intelligence officer Gina Ortiz Jones and high-school teacher Rick Trevino. Ortiz Jones won the runoff.

In July 2018, it was reported that the election was on track to become "the most expensive congressional race in the state's history".

The race was the closest House race in Texas and one of the closest in the country. The Associated Press initially called it for Hurd on election night, but an additional batch of votes temporarily gave Ortiz Jones a small lead, which Hurd then regained. After all provisional and overseas ballots were counted, Hurd was declared the official winner on November 19 by a margin of 926 votes.

=== Tenure ===
Hurd assumed office as a U.S. representative on January 3, 2015. During his first term, he ranked third among freshman House members who had the most bills passed. Much of Hurd's work focused on bipartisan cybersecurity and technology bills. Hurd has been described as a leading congressional voice on technology issues.

In July 2015, Hurd was named to replace Aaron Schock of Illinois as a co-chair of the Congressional Future Caucus, along with Tulsi Gabbard of Hawaii. In his first term in Congress, Hurd was made the chairman of the Information Technology Subcommittee of the House Committee on Oversight and Government Reform that focuses in part on cybersecurity), which is unusual for a first-term member of Congress.

Hurd was the vice-chair of the Border and Maritime Subcommittee of the Homeland Security Committee. He was appointed to the House Permanent Select Committee on Intelligence for his second term, replacing Mike Pompeo, who departed to head the CIA. Hurd's background as a former undercover clandestine officer led The Daily Dot to call him "The Most Interesting Man in Congress".

Along with Brian Fitzpatrick, John Katko, and Elise Stefanik, Hurd was considered one of the most moderate Republicans in the House. He voted against his party's positions on LGBT rights, gun control, immigration, repeal of the Affordable Care Act, and congressional oversight, and he received praise for his bipartisanship. Hurd was a member of the Republican Main Street Partnership.

As of August 2019, Hurd was the only black Republican in the House of Representatives. He has said that the principal role of the government in the lives of African Americans should be to empower them to do things for themselves.

According to USA Today, Hurd's district "spans two time zones and more than 800 miles of the U.S.-Mexico border". As of January 2019, Hurd was the only Republican member of Congress representing a district along the U.S.–Mexican border.

In 2019, Hurd joined the Transatlantic Task Force of the German Marshall Fund and the Bundeskanzler-Helmut-Schmidt-Stiftung (BKHS), co-chaired by Karen Donfried and Wolfgang Ischinger.

On August 1, 2019, Hurd did not seek reelection to Congress in 2020.

=== Caucus memberships ===
- Congressional Future Caucus (co-chair)

=== Committee assignments ===
- House Committee on Oversight and Government Reform
  - Information Technology Subcommittee (chair)
- Homeland Security Committee
  - Border and Maritime Subcommittee (vice-chair)
- House Permanent Select Committee on Intelligence

== Political positions ==
In 2015, Hurd voted 96% with his party's position on roll-call votes. As of August 2019, he had voted with his party in 82% of votes in the 116th United States Congress and in line with Trump's position in 81.3% of votes. Hurd is frequently described as a moderate Republican.

=== 2011 congressional district map ===
In March 2017, a three-member panel of federal judges invalidated the Texas State Legislature's 2011 drawing of three congressional districts (Hurd's 23rd district, the 27th district, and the 35th district), finding that Texas had intentionally discriminated against blacks and Latinos in violation of either the U.S. Constitution or the Voting Rights Act. Hurd's election victory occurred using a court-approved 2013 interim map that differed from the 2011 map. The San Antonio Express-News editorial board wrote that "partisan motivations" influenced the drawing of the lines for the U.S. House seats by the Republican majority in the Texas state legislature. Hurd staunchly defended his district's boundaries. Hurd added that a revised district plan would not affect his work in Congress or his hopes of winning a third term in 2018.

=== Bipartisanship ===
Allegheny College gave the 2018 Prize for Civility in Public Life to Hurd and Beto O'Rourke, a Texas Democrat. In March 2017, facing snowstorm-induced flight cancellations, Hurd and O'Rourke, both stuck in San Antonio, needed to get back to Washington for a House vote. They rented a car and embarked on a 1,600-mile (2,600 km) drive that they captured on Facebook Live. Hurd and O'Rourke worked together on legislation subsequent to the road trip.

In 2019, Hurd was one of eight House Republicans who voted in favor of the Equality Act, which would provide federal non-discrimination protections for LGBTQ Americans.

=== Fiscal policy ===
In 2019, Hurd was one of seven Republicans to break with the Trump administration position and vote with Democrats to end a government shutdown.

=== Foreign policy and national security ===
Hurd called for a ramp-up of U.S. military action against ISIS in Libya and in Syria, using the 2001 invasion of Afghanistan as a model. He blamed ISIL's rise on the Obama administration, accusing it of underestimating the threat. Hurd has written that Islamic extremists "are in it for the long haul, which means that we have to be also". On the broader Syrian civil war, Hurd has written that "the brutal dictator Bashar al-Asad must go".

Hurd has called for greater U.S. defenses against foreign cyber-attacks. Following the Office of Personnel Management data breach, he wrote that federal cybersecurity was woefully inadequate. He opposes applying the Wassenaar Arrangement to cyber technologies, arguing that "attempting to regulate cybersecurity technologies through export controls is a fundamentally flawed approach" that places the U.S. at risk and "will not achieve the goal of curbing human rights violations".

Hurd opposed the Joint Comprehensive Plan of Action (an international agreement with Iran over its nuclear program), calling it "short-sighted and ultimately dangerous", and called for the U.S. to reimpose various sanctions against Iran, arguing that Iran violated its obligations under the agreement. He has spoken out against Russian aggression, calling the Russian government "our adversary".

Hurd favored the lifting of a longstanding U.S. ban on the export of crude oil.

Hurd opposes the normalization of Cuba–U.S. relations.

Along with Martha McSally and Michael McCaul, Hurd helped draft the Final Report of the Task Force on Combating Terrorist and Foreign Fighter Travel of the U.S. House Homeland Security Committee.

Hurd questioned FBI director James Comey's recommendation not to seek prosecution of then-presidential candidate Hillary Clinton over the Clinton e-mail controversy. Referencing his experience in the CIA, Hurd said he knew the importance of classified information because he had seen his friends killed and assets put in harm's way to obtain such sensitive information.

In January 2018, Hurd voted down Democratic motions in the House Intelligence Committee to allow the Justice Department and FBI to review the Devin Nunes memo, a document alleging FBI abuses of surveillance powers in the investigation of Russian interference in the 2016 election, before releasing it to the public. The FBI said it had "grave concerns about material omissions of fact that fundamentally impact the memo's accuracy". Hurd voted against the release of a related memo authored by Democrats on the House Intelligence Committee.

Hurd has opposed the CIA's efforts to mandate weaker encryption on smartphones and other devices to make it easier for federal agents to unlock them, arguing that stronger encryption thwarts hackers and protects national security.

=== Healthcare ===
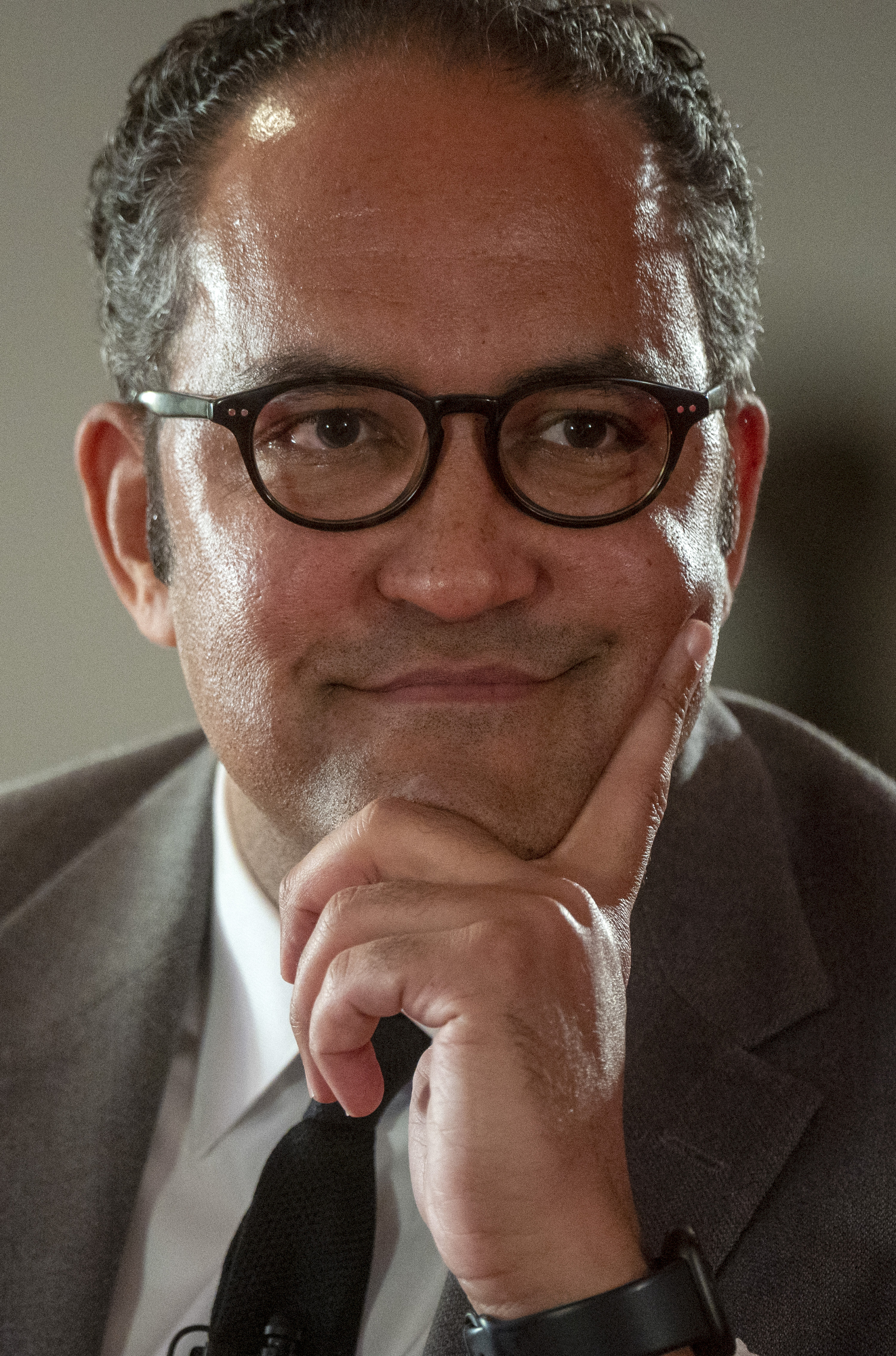
Hurd at the LBJ Presidential Library in 2022

Hurd favors repealing the Affordable Care Act, also known as Obamacare. In 2017, when House Republican leadership introduced the American Health Care Act (a bill to repeal the ACA), he faced a political quandary. Hurd did not say whether he supported or opposed the legislation. Ultimately, after the measure was declared dead and withdrawn from a planned vote due to insufficient support, Hurd "released a statement in which he appeared to oppose the overhaul". When the bill came up for a vote again, he voted against it, opposing it because he feared it would hurt people with pre-existing medical conditions. Some Democrats castigated Hurd for the length of his consideration of the bill, but constituents and ACA supporters praised him for declining to support the bill, with former United States Secretary of Housing and Urban Development Julian Castro calling Hurd's vote a "good decision".

=== Immigration ===
Hurd spoke out against Trump's 2017 executive order to build a wall along the southern border with Mexico, saying it was a "third-century solution to a 21st-century problem" and the "most expensive and least effective way to secure the border". Hurd instead advocated for a "flexible, sector-by-sector approach that empowers Border Patrol agents on the ground with the resources they need". He proposed using "a mix of technology. It's going to be significantly cheaper than building a wall. Let's focus on drug traffickers ... and human smugglers".

Hurd criticized Trump's 2017 executive order to bar the entry of nationals of seven Muslim-majority countries to the U.S., describing it as the "ultimate display of mistrust".

=== Donald Trump ===
In February 2017, Hurd voted against a resolution that would have directed the House to request ten years of President Trump's tax returns, which would then have been reviewed by the House Ways and Means Committee in a closed session. In February 2019, on Real Time with Bill Maher, Maher pressed Hurd about his vote against the February 2017 resolution to request Trump's tax returns. Hurd said that the resolution had not been on the floor for a vote, but that he would support renewed efforts by the House to obtain the returns.

In July 2019, Hurd was one of four Republican House members to vote in support of a motion to condemn tweets by Trump calling for the members of the Squad to "go back and help fix the totally broken and crime infested places from which they came".

Hurd did not openly support impeachment for the Trump-Ukraine scandal of fall 2019. He said, "some of these things are indeed damning. However, I want to make sure we get through this entire investigation before coming to some kind of conclusion". In December 2019, he voted against both articles of impeachment.

In a July 2020 interview, Hurd said he might not vote for Trump in the 2020 presidential election.

=== Other views ===
According to a 2016 analysis by Vote Smart, a nonprofit, nonpartisan research organization that collects and distributes information on candidates for public office in the United States, Hurd generally supports anti-abortion legislation, opposes an income tax increase, opposes federal spending that doesn't benefit the military or state security, and supports lowering taxes as a means of promoting economic growth, supports building the Keystone Pipeline, opposes the federal regulation of greenhouse gas emissions, opposes gun-control legislation, and supports increased American intervention in Iraq and Syria beyond air support.

== Post-congressional career ==
Hurd became a Winter 2021 Resident Fellow at the Institute of Politics of the University of Chicago. There, Hurd leads a series of seminars. In May 2021, Hurd was appointed to the board of directors for OpenAI. In July 2023, Hurd announced that he had resigned from OpenAI's board of directors before his presidential campaign began in order to focus on politics.

On March 29, 2022, Simon & Schuster published Hurd's first book, entitled American Reboot: An Idealist's Guide to Getting Big Things Done, a combination memoir and blueprint for the country's future. It received largely positive reviews.

On October 29, 2024, Hurd was appointed as the Chief Strategy Officer at CHAOS Industries, a technology company that builds detection and monitoring solutions for defense and critical industries.

== 2024 presidential campaign ==
Hurd's 2024 presidential campaign logo

On June 22, 2023, Hurd announced his candidacy for the Republican nomination in the 2024 United States presidential election. At the time of his announcement, Hurd said he hoped his electoral record and willingness to criticize former president Donald Trump would distinguish him from other candidates. He has said he will not support Trump if Trump is the eventual nominee, and said that he believes that the evidence in the indictments against Donald Trump points to Trump acting like a person who knows he is guilty. Hurd also said he would not sign a pledge to support the eventual Republican nominee; signing the pledge was required by the Republican National Committee to participate in the primary debate. Despite fellow candidate Chris Christie also criticizing the pledge, but nonetheless willing to sign it in order to debate, Hurd said he wouldn't "lie to get access to a microphone." Hurd also said he would not sign a similar pledge required by the Republican Party of Florida to appear on the primary ballot.

At a July 28, 2023 town-hall in New Hampshire, run in partnership by WMUR-TV and the University of New Hampshire, Hurd outlined his issues as:

- Supporting continued US foreign intervention to protect the American way of life.
- Counteract and destroy Chinese, Russian, Iran, and North Korean espionage efforts.
- Rebuilding the Internet's infrastructure to protect Americans online and to crack down on cybercrime.
- Comparing AI to nuclear fission, stating that the government should heavily monitor it, as it does with nuclear power.
- Reducing the federal deficit by creating a consistent 2 or 4 year budget to create incentives for proper spending.
- Supporting bi-partisanship and working with Democrats on key issues.
- An all-of-the-above energy policy including expanding renewable, nuclear, and fossil fuel energy for energy independence.
- Supporting further gun regulation, including universal background checks and increasing the age to own a high-caliber firearm to 21.
- Stated his intention to run was to prevent Donald Trump from becoming the nominee, who he believes cannot beat Joe Biden.
- Was pro-life and willing to sign a federal 15-week abortion ban, as long as there are exceptions to troubled pregnancies.
- Supporting domestic industry namely supporting domestic circuitry, technology, and computer manufacturing.
- Reducing barriers to medication, namely with new price transparency laws.
- Was skeptical of a major new centrist third party due to coalition politics, but supports an expansion of jungle primaries.
- Supporting social security as it is, but also finding a place for private companies.
- Growing minority voter bases in the Republican Party, namely Latinos, African Americans, and Women.
- A strict enforcement of asylum system in the United States, using it to protect persecuted peoples, not those seeking better jobs.
- Supporting either a physical, or technological barrier on the border and working with nations to build better deportation centers.
- Increasing America's mental health networks to better support the mentally ill.

Hurd voiced support for designating a no-fly zone over Ukraine. He has also stated Ukraine should be given all the "equipment and military they need in order to win the war immediately."

At the Republican Party of Iowa's annual Lincoln Dinner (one of the state's most important Republican political events for candidates), a number of candidates gave speeches. Hurd's speech included a dig at former President Donald Trump, saying that Trump "is running to stay out of prison." In response Hurd was booed by attendees. Trump responded by calling Hurd a "failed former Congressman" and his campaign for president "ridiculous" on Truth Social. Hurd responded by calling Trump a "liar", "loser", and a "national security threat" on an interview with PBS.

The New Republic called Hurd the Never Trump movement's "Last, Best Hope" claiming that he was the embodiment of the Republican Party's moderate wing. Instead of the "rigid and somewhat insulated stereotypical GOP congressman" Hurd is known for his flexibility on bipartisan issues and regular meetings with his constituents to know what issues affect them personally. Hurd has also voiced doubt about the loyalty of the Republican Party to Donald Trump, as most congressional Republicans only started to support him after he became the nominee in 2016.

He did not qualify for the first Republican presidential debate, which was held on August 23, 2023. Instead, he gave an interview with Politico live as the debate was taking place, giving his opinion on the events of the debate as they happened. During which he criticized Vivek Ramaswamy stating that: “Anybody who wants to kiss the butt of Vladimir Putin has no chance in a general election. Anybody who’s a 9/11 [skeptic], you know, talking about there’s some hoax or insider job, to me is just outrageous.” As well as being critical of all in attendance who stated they would still support Trump as candidate if he was convicted, and said up until that point that Nikki Haley was having a good night. He also reiterated his desire to create a no-fly-zone over Ukraine, and concluded that none of the candidates impressed him.

On September 20, 2023, Hurd unveiled a detailed plan for how he would regulate AI if elected President, comparing AI to nuclear fusion, and proposing creating a branch of the executive to deal solely and directly on the issue of AI, and proposing strict regulations on civilian AI usage.

On October 9, 2023, Hurd suspended his campaign for president and endorsed Haley for the nomination.

== Personal life ==
In 2017, Politico reported that he was dating Lynlie Wallace, the chief of staff to Texas State Representative Lyle Larson. Hurd announced on social media that he and Wallace married on December 31, 2022. The couple have a daughter.

Hurd lives in the city of Helotes, Texas, a suburb of San Antonio.

As of 2026, he works for Jason Ballard's 3D-printing construction company Icon 3D.

== See also ==
- List of African-American Republicans
- List of African-American United States representatives

U.S. House of Representatives
Preceded by Pete Gallego	Member of the U.S. House of Representatives from Texas's 23rd congressional district 2015–2021	Succeeded by Tony Gonzales
U.S. order of precedence (ceremonial)
Preceded by Beto O'Rourke as Former U.S. Representative	Order of precedence of the United States as Former U.S. Representative	Succeeded by Colin Allred as Former U.S. Representative
