= Quico Canseco =

American politician (born 1949)

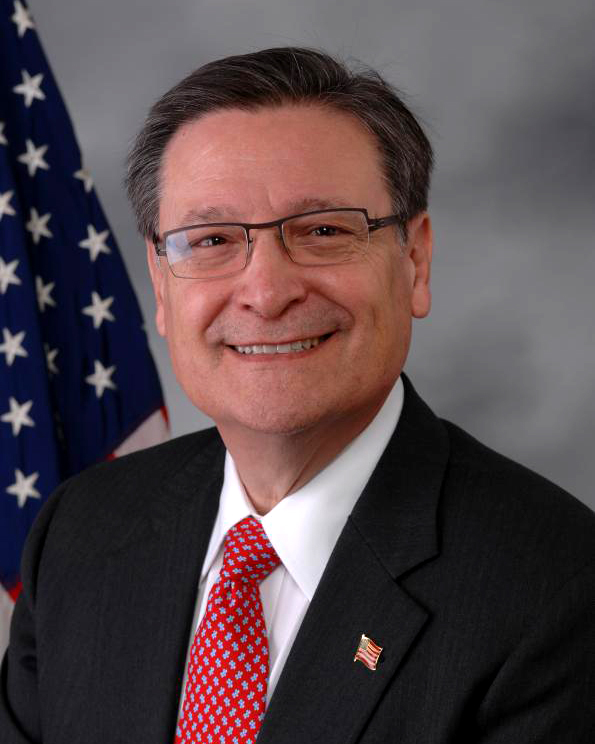
- Official portrait, c. 2011

Member of the U.S. House of Representatives from Texas's 23rd district
- In office January 3, 2011 – January 3, 2013
- Preceded by: Ciro Rodriguez
- Succeeded by: Pete Gallego

Personal details
- Born: Francisco Raul Canseco; July 30, 1949 (age 77) Laredo, Texas, U.S.
- Party: Republican
- Spouse: Gloria Canseco
- Children: 3
- Education: Saint Louis University (BA, JD)
- Website: Official website

Francisco Raul "Quico" Canseco (born July 30, 1949) is an American attorney and businessman who was the U.S. representative for Texas's 23rd congressional district from 2011 to 2013. He is a member of the Republican Party.

Defeated for re-election in 2012, Canseco launched a bid to return to Congress in 2014. He was handily defeated by Will Hurd in a runoff primary election. In another bid to return to the U.S. House, Canseco ran in the 2018 Republican primary for Texas's 21st congressional district to succeed retiring incumbent Republican Lamar Smith. He was ultimately unsuccessful, garnering less than 5% of the vote. He was again an unsuccessful candidate in the 2026 election in the 23rd congressional district, attempting to primary incumbent Tony Gonzales.

== Early life and education ==
Canseco was born and reared in Laredo in Webb County in south Texas, the eldest of eight children of Consuelo Sada Rangel and Dr. Francisco Manuel Canseco, who were both born in Monterrey, Mexico. He earned a B.A in History from Saint Louis University in 1972. He went on to earn a J.D. from Saint Louis University School of Law in 1975. He is a brother in the Tau Kappa Epsilon International Fraternity. His father was of Italian descent and his mother was of Sephardic Jewish descent.

== Legal and business career ==
Canseco began his legal career in 1975 as an associate attorney with Mann, Castillon, Fried and Kazen in Laredo. Afterwards, he operated his own practice for five years. Then he joined Person, Whitworth, Ramos, Borchers, and Morales in Laredo as a participating associate. In 1987, he left that firm to become general counsel at Union National Bank of Texas, where he stayed until 1992. He was later counsel to Escamilla and Ponek, from 2003 until 2007. He became chairman of Texas Heritage Bancshares from 2001 until 2007.

Since 1988, Canseco has been President/Director of FMC Developers, which includes Canseco Investments (incorporated in 1993). He, along with Chairman James William Danner Sr., took Hondo National Bank from being a failing bank with $8 million in assets and one location, to an institution with over $180 million and four branches today. Canseco served as Board President since 1995.

== U.S. House of Representatives ==
=== Elections ===
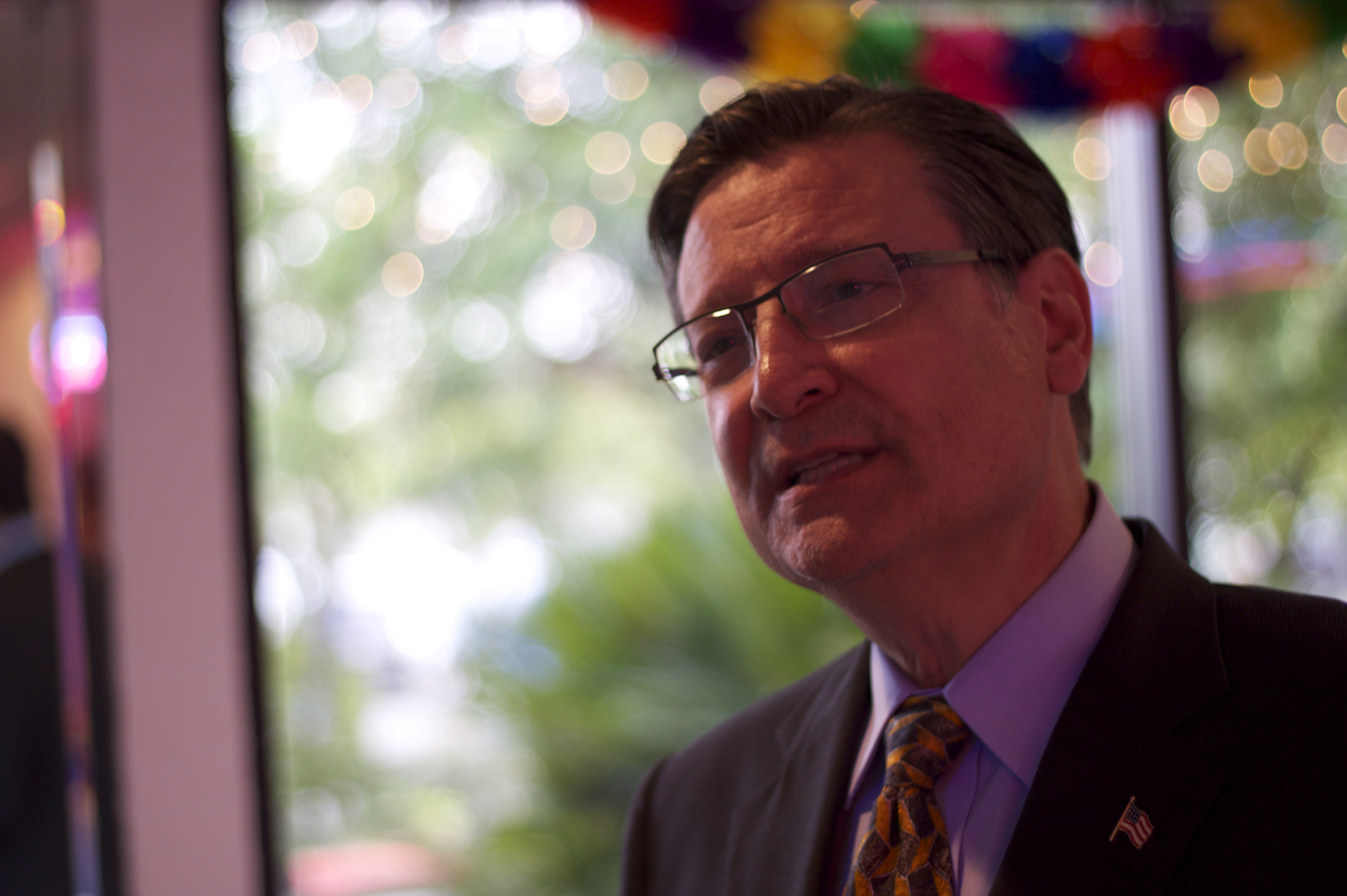
Canseco at a campaign rally in San Antonio

2004

Canseco ran for the newly redrawn Texas's 28th congressional district. In the Republican primary, he and attorney Jim Hopson qualified for a run-off election. Canseco got just 21% of the vote, while Hopson got 49% of the vote (barely missing the 50% threshold to win the primary). In the run-off election, Hopson defeated Canseco 65% to 35%.

2008

Canseco was defeated in the Republican primary by Bexar County Commissioner and former San Antonio city councilman Lyle Larson 62% to 38%.

2010

In the Republican primary, Canseco and CIA officer Will Hurd qualified for a run-off election; Hurd got 34%, while Canseco got 32%. In the run-off, Canseco defeated Hurd 53% to 47%.

In the general election, Canseco faced incumbent Democratic congressman Ciro Rodriguez. The Republican National Committee gave strong financial support to Canseco in an effort to regain the seat for the Republicans. As of October 13, 2010, Rodriguez had raised more cash overall ($1,481,520 versus Canseco's $980,821), but Canseco had more cash on hand ($147,961 versus Rodriguez's $90,915).

Canseco defeated Rodriguez by a vote by of 74,853 (49%) to 67,348 (44%).

2012

Ciro Rodriguez filed for a rematch with Canseco in 2012, but he lost the Democratic primary to State Representative Pete Gallego, 55% to 45%.

In the November 6 general election, Canseco lost his seat to Gallego by a vote of 96,676 (50%) to 87,547 (46%). Two minor candidates held the remaining 4.1% of the ballots. The race was contested amid allegations of voter fraud and irregularities. On November 9, Canseco conceded to Gallego, citing the high costs and lengthy period of time required to contest the election. Although Canseco continued to allege numerous irregularities, he had concluded that "a full investigation and recount would be expensive and time-consuming," considering that the 23rd District embraces all or parts of 29 counties. Canseco carried the district's portion of Bexar County, home to more than half the district's population. However, it was not enough to overcome Gallego's margins in the central and western portions of the district, which were virtually coextensive with Gallego's old state House district. Gallego also dominated the heavily Hispanic border areas.

=== Tenure ===
Canseco describes himself as a "limited-government conservative."

He supports the Arizona immigration law. He supports the extension of the Bush tax cuts and repealing the Patient Protection and Affordable Care Act. During the campaign, Canseco openly identified with the Tea Party movement.

Canseco was a member of the Republican Study Committee, a caucus of conservative House Republicans. During his tenure, he was one of four voting Latino members of Congress known to be a member of the RSC, the others being Bill Flores of Texas, Raul Labrador of Idaho and Jaime Herrera Beutler of Washington. He was also a member of the Congressional Hispanic Conference. In 2012, Canseco delivered the Spanish language version of the Republican response to the State of the Union address.

In summer 2011, Canseco was criticized after initially declining to introduce a bill allowing for a swap of land between the Federal Government and Bexar County, Texas. The bill, which was supported by United States Secretary of the Interior Ken Salazar and sponsored by retiring Senator Kay Bailey Hutchison in the Senate, would expand the development of the San Antonio River to the San Antonio Missions National Historical Park.

In October 2011, Canseco introduced the San Antonio Missions National Historical Park Boundary Expansion Act in the House, which mirrored Hutchison's Senate bill. The legislation would cost roughly $4 million over four years, even though the lands would be donated.

In April 2012, Canseco traveled using the San Antonio International Airport. He said that he was assaulted by the Transportation Security Administration when an officer "was patting me down where no one is supposed to go." The TSA officer said that he was assaulted by Canseco, but no arrests were made. Canseco advocates for changes in security procedures.

Canseco reportedly voted with his party 96% of the time on all issues.

=== Committee assignments ===
- Committee on Financial Services
  - Subcommittee on Financial Institutions and Consumer Credit
  - Subcommittee on Oversight and Investigations

== Post-congressional career ==
2014 U.S. House campaign

In 2014, Canseco launched a bid to return to Congress. He was handily defeated by Will Hurd in a runoff primary election. Hurd went on to win the general election over incumbent Democratic U.S. Representative Pete Gallego.

2018 U.S. House campaign

In another bid to return to Congress, Canseco ran in the 18-way Republican primary for Texas's 21st congressional district to succeed the retiring incumbent Republican Lamar Smith. He was ultimately unsuccessful, garnering less than 5% of the vote.

2026 U.S. House campaign

Canseco was a candidate in the 2026 U.S. House election in Texas's 23rd congressional district, running against incumbent Tony Gonzales in the Republican primary. Canseco came in fourth place in the primary, receiving less than 7% of the vote.

== Personal life ==
Canseco and his wife, Gloria, have been married since 1979. The couple resides in San Antonio. They have three children and attend St. Matthew's Roman Catholic Church. He attended Culver Military Academy in his youth.

== Electoral history ==
=== 2012 ===
Texas's 23rd congressional district election, 2012
Party	Candidate	Votes	%
Democratic	Pete Gallego	96,477	50.33
Republican	Quico Canseco	87,255	45.52
Libertarian	Jeffrey C. Blunt	5,827	3.04
Green	Ed Scharf	2,099	1.09
Total votes		191,658	5.89

=== 2010 ===
2010 23rd Congressional District of Texas Elections
Party	Candidate	Votes	%	±%
Republican	Quico Canseco	74,671	49.38	
Democratic	Ciro Rodriguez	67,212	44.44	

== See also ==
- List of Hispanic and Latino Americans in the United States Congress

U.S. House of Representatives
Preceded by Ciro Rodriguez	Member of the U.S. House of Representatives from Texas's 23rd congressional district 2011–2013	Succeeded by Pete Gallego
U.S. order of precedence (ceremonial)
Preceded by Chris Bell as Former U.S. Representative	Order of precedence of the United States as Former U.S. Representative	Succeeded by Pete Gallego as Former U.S. Representative
