= Tony Gonzales =

American politician (born 1980)

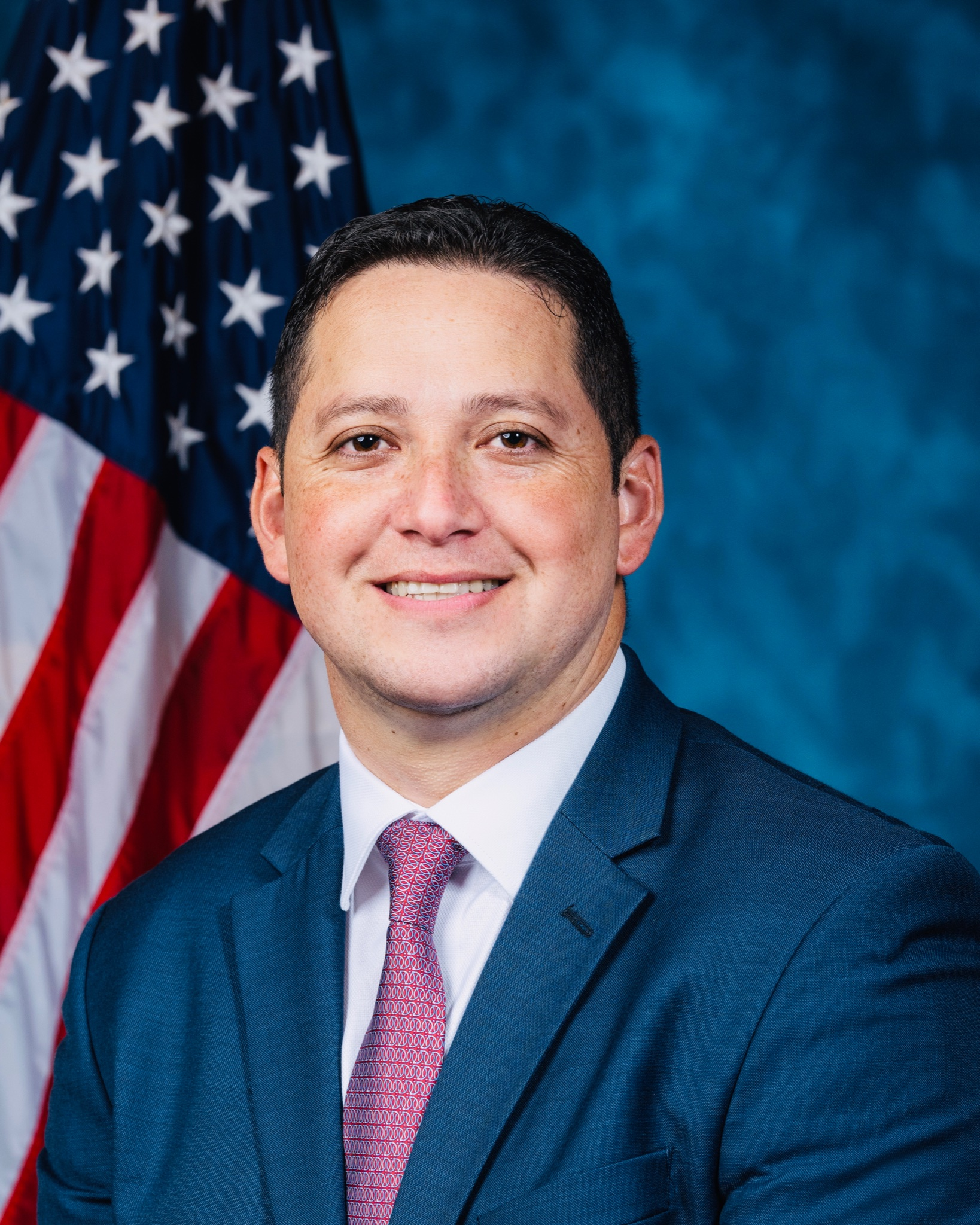
- Official portrait, 2020

Member of the U.S. House of Representatives from Texas's 23rd district
- In office January 3, 2021 – April 14, 2026
- Preceded by: Will Hurd
- Succeeded by: Katy Padilla Stout (elect)

Personal details
- Born: Ernest Anthony Gonzales II; October 10, 1980 (age 46) San Antonio, Texas, U.S.
- Party: Republican
- Spouse: Angel Gonzales
- Children: 6
- Education: Chaminade University (AA); Excelsior College (BS); American Public University (MA); University of Southern Mississippi (attended)

Military service
- Allegiance: United States
- Branch/service: United States Navy
- Years of service: 1999–2019
- Rank: Master Chief Petty Officer
- Unit: Cryptologic Technician
- Battles/wars: Iraq War; War in Afghanistan
- Gonzales's voice Gonzales on Domestic Violence Awareness Month. Recorded October 20, 2021

Ernest Anthony Gonzales II (born October 10, 1980) is an American politician and U.S. Navy veteran who served as the U.S. representative for Texas's 23rd congressional district from 2021 until his resignation in April 2026 after admitting to an affair with a staffer who had died by suicide.

A moderate Republican, Gonzales was censured by the Texas Republican Party in 2023 for voting in favor of the Respect for Marriage Act and the Bipartisan Safer Communities Act. He is also one of 18 Republicans who voted against Jim Jordan's nomination for Speaker of the House all three times, and the only Republican to have voted against the House rules package afterwards. Gonzales's votes prompted several conservative primary challengers in 2024, most notably YouTuber Brandon Herrera, who forced a runoff after Gonzales received less than 50% of the vote. He won the runoff election with 50.7% of the vote.

In 2026, Gonzales initially ran for re-election. He faced and denied allegations of a sexual affair with a staffer who had later killed herself by self-immolation. After failing to secure more than 50% of the vote in the primary on March 3, he was set to face Brandon Herrera in a runoff scheduled for May 2026. On March 4, Gonzales admitted to the affair, dropping his re-election campaign amid pressure from party leadership the following day. On April 13, 2026, he resigned, effective the following day.

== Early life and education ==
Gonzales was raised in San Antonio, Texas. He earned an Associate of Arts from Chaminade University of Honolulu, a Bachelor of Science from Excelsior University, a graduate certificate in legislative studies from Georgetown University, and a Master of Arts from American Public University. He is a PhD candidate in international development at the University of Southern Mississippi.

== Early career ==
From 1999 to 2019, Gonzales served in the United States Navy, retiring with the rank of master chief petty officer. A trained Cryptologist Technician (Interpretive) (CTI), Gonzales was deployed as aircrew in VQ EP-3Es to support operations in Iraq and Afghanistan receiving an air medal for his service. He was also stationed in Tampa, Florida; Pensacola, Florida; Kāneʻohe Bay; and San Antonio, and assigned to the United States Navy Office of Legislative Affairs.

Gonzales served as a Department of Defense fellow in the office of Senator Marco Rubio and also worked as an assistant professor of political science at the University of Maryland Global Campus.

== U.S. House of Representatives ==
=== Elections ===
==== 2020 ====
Gonzales ran for Texas's 23rd congressional district in the 2020 election. The seat was open, as three-term Republican incumbent Will Hurd did not seek reelection. In the Republican primary, Gonzales narrowly defeated Raul Reyes after a recount. During the primary, Gonzales was endorsed by Hurd and President Donald Trump. In the November general election, Gonzales defeated Democratic nominee Gina Ortiz Jones. The result was considered an upset, as most forecasters believed that the Democrats were favored to flip the district after Hurd's retirement.

==== 2022 ====
Gonzales ran for re-election in 2022, winning his primary with 78% of the vote and the general election with 55.87% against Democrat John Lira and Independent candidate Frank Lopez Jr.

==== 2024 ====
2024 GOP primary results by county: 30–40% Gonzales 40–50% Gonzales 50–60% Gonzales 60–70% Gonzales

2024 GOP primary runoff results by county: Gonzales: 50–60% Gonzales; 60–70% Gonzales; Herrera: 50–60% Herrera; 60–70% Herrera; 70–80% Herrera; 80–90% Herrera

Gonzales was reelected to a third term in 2024. Gonzales faced a strong primary challenge from Brandon Herrera. He won the Republican primary over his primary challenger Brandon Herrera by fewer than 400 votes with 50.6% of the ballots cast. To secure Gonzales's victory, several establishment-allied super PACs put more than $4 million in TV advertising. Herrera spent $1.3 million on TV ads compared to Gonzales's $1.9 million.

After facing down conservative opposition over his votes in Congress, Gonzales garnered 62.3% of the vote in the general election, defeating Democratic challenger Santos Limon by over 71,000 votes.

==== 2026 ====
2026 GOP primary results by county: Gonzales: 30–40%; 40–50%; 50–60%; Herrera: 40–50%; 50–60%; 60–70%; Tie

Gonzales ran for re-election in 2026, facing Herrera and three other challengers in the Republican primary. He again failed to achieve more than 50% of the vote in the primary, placing second to Herrera 41.8%–43.3%. With no candidates securing more than 50% of the vote in the primary, Gonzales was set to face Herrera in a runoff scheduled for May 2026.

After initially denying reports of an affair with a staffer who later committed suicide by self-immolation, Gonzales admitted to the affair on March 4. He ended his re-election campaign amid pressure from party leadership the following day.

=== Tenure ===
Gonzales voted against impeaching Trump after the events of January 6, 2021, saying that the nation needed to heal and that he looked forward to working with President Biden to do that.

Like all other Senate and House Republicans, Gonzales voted against the American Rescue Plan Act of 2021.

On May 19, 2021, Gonzales was one of 35 Republicans to join all Democrats in voting to approve legislation to establish the January 6, 2021 commission meant to investigate the storming of the U.S. Capitol.

On March 4, 2023, the Texas Republican Party's executive committee censured Gonzales for failing to vote in line with the party positions, citing his decision to support the Bipartisan Safer Communities Act and the Respect for Marriage Act (both in 2022) as well as his vote against a House rules packages passed after the contested 2023 Speaker election. Conservative representatives such as Matt Gaetz and Bob Good endorsed Brandon Herrera, a primary challenger to Gonzales for the 2024 election, whom Gonzales criticized during an appearance on CNN's State of the Union in April 2024. He called Republican hardliners "real scumbags" who "walk around with white hoods", and called his primary opponent a "neo-Nazi" and an "anarchist" intent on "burning the place down." This came after Gonzales voted in favor of three contentious foreign aid packages for Ukraine, Israel, and East Asia, all of which required bipartisan backing to move on.

==== Affair with political aide ====
On February 17, 2026, the San Antonio Express-News published text messages allegedly from Regina Ann Santos-Aviles, a political aide to Gonzales, to another staffer. In the text messages from April 2025, Santos-Aviles wrote that she had an affair with Gonzales in 2024.

According to her husband, Adrian Aviles, Santos-Aviles confessed to the affair on May 29, 2024, one day after Gonzales's victory in the 2024 Republican primary. Aviles told media outlets that his wife had a sexual relationship with Gonzales for two to three weeks before he caught her, and she admitted the affair. Following this, Aviles asked his wife to quit her job, but she refused. Aviles then confronted Gonzales and his campaign about the affair, which led to Santos-Aviles being treated like a pariah at work. The couple later separated, and Santos-Aviles fell into depression. Aviles stated that she threatened to kill herself in August 2025 but police arrived before she could, though they found "nothing of concern."

On September 13, 2025, Santos-Aviles poured gasoline on herself, outside of her home in Uvalde, and self-immolated. She died the following day at the Brooke Army Medical Center. Her death was ruled a suicide by the Bexar County medical examiner in November 2025. Police stated that video footage showed that Santos-Aviles was home alone at the time of the incident, and no foul play was suspected. A lawyer for Santos-Aviles's husband stated that her affair with Gonzales was an "open secret", and was not believed to have played a role in her suicide. The Daily Mail had previously reported on the alleged affair, though the story was denied by Gonzales at the time. According to Santos-Aviles's mother, her last words were "I don't want to die". Her funeral was held on September 25, 2025; Gonzales did not attend.

In an official response to the publication of the text messages, Gonzales blamed primary opponent Brandon Herrera for the story's publishing, while declining to answer questions about the alleged affair. Several conservatives, including Herrera and Wesley Virdell, subsequently called on Gonzales to resign; while the San Antonio Express-News revoked their endorsement of Gonzales. The White House, which had endorsed Gonzales in the upcoming 2026 Republican primary, declined to comment.

On February 23, 2026, the San Antonio Express-News published alleged text messages sent from Gonzales to Santos-Aviles, where Gonzales asked for a "sexy pic" and about her favorite sexual positions. Following this, Republican House representatives including Lauren Boebert, Tim Burchett, Brandon Gill, Kevin Kiley, Anna Paulina Luna, Nancy Mace, Thomas Massie, Chip Roy, and former House Speaker Kevin McCarthy variously called on Gonzales to resign or drop his re-election bid; as well as The Dallas Morning News. Conversely, Republicans including House Speaker Mike Johnson, as well as representatives Jim Jordan and Don Bacon did not call on Gonzales to resign. NBC News also reported that the Office of Congressional Conduct concluded an investigation into the matter, but is not scheduled to submit a report until after the primary ends.

Despite calls from congressional members, Gonzales refused to resign, saying: "There will be an opportunity for all the details and facts to come out. What you've seen is not all the facts."

On March 4, 2026, Gonzales admitted for the first time, in an interview with Joe Pags, that he had an affair with Santos-Aviles. That same day, Rep. Luna filed two House resolutions to censure Gonzales or strip him of committee assignments.

On March 5, 2026, House GOP leadership (Speaker of the House Mike Johnson, Majority Leader Steve Scalise, Majority Whip Tom Emmer and House Republican Conference chairwoman Lisa McClain) released a joint statement in which they called for Gonzales to withdraw from his re-election campaign and stated that an investigation into Gonzales's conduct has begun. Later that same day, Gonzales ended his campaign.

On April 6, 2026, a second former staffer of Gonzales's accused him of sending her sexually explicit messages. According to text messages published by the San Antonio Express-News, Gonzales asked the second woman for nude photos, asked "What kind of panties do you wear?", and wrote that he wanted to have sex with her and have her "squeeze my balls."

On April 11, 2026, Axios reported that Representative Luna planned to force a vote of expulsion against Gonzales, as well as Democratic US Representative Eric Swalwell following his sexual assault allegations, within the next several days. Several House representatives from both parties including Byron Donalds, Pramila Jayapal, Ro Khanna, and Jared Huffman supported Luna's move.

==== Resignation ====
On April 13, 2026, Gonzales resigned from Congress, effective the following day. U.S. Representative Eric Swalwell similarly resigned the same day. His resignation will trigger a special election in which the winner will serve in the United States House of Representatives for the remainder of the 119th United States Congress.

Following his resignation, Gonzales's campaign and related PAC reported paying $54,350 to two companies managed by his wife, Adulting Consulting and Casagrande LLC, according to Federal Election Commission records. Both companies were registered after he left office and list a UPS store address a few minutes from his residence, the same address used by his campaign committee.

=== Committee assignments ===
- Committee on Appropriations
  - Subcommittee on Military Construction, Veterans Affairs, and Related Agencies
  - Subcommittee on Transportation, Housing and Urban Development, and Related Agencies

=== Caucus memberships ===
- Climate Solutions Caucus
- Problem Solvers Caucus
- Republican Study Committee

=== Party leadership ===
- Assistant Republican Whip (2021–2026)

== Political positions ==
=== Abortion ===
Gonzales describes himself as pro-life. He co-sponsored the No Taxpayer Funding for Abortion and Abortion Insurance Full Disclosure Act of 2021 (H.R. 18), which aims to codify the Hyde Amendment banning federal funding for abortions.

=== Foreign policy ===
During the Russo-Ukrainian War, Gonzales signed a letter urging President Joe Biden to give F-16 fighter jets to Ukraine.

Gonzales voted to support Israel following the 2023 Hamas attack on Israel.

Gonzales proposed a new Iranian Campaign Service Medal for Operation Midnight Hammer for the pilots and support personnel of the aircraft involved. In June 2025 he filed H.R. 4254 Iranian Campaign Medal Act that expanded eligibility to the entire Twelve-Day War.

=== Gun rights ===
Gonzales supported amending the 2021 National Defense Authorization Act to remove a proposed red flag law provision. He and other House Republicans signed a letter that argued the provision would infringe on Second Amendment rights and allow "military judges and magistrates to issue military court gun confiscation orders."

After the Robb Elementary School shooting in Gonzales's congressional district, Gonzales voted for the Bipartisan Safer Communities Act and cited his experience growing up in an abusive household (including an instance of his father threatening his mother with a gun) as his reason for supporting the act.

=== Immigration ===
Gonzales supports keeping Title 42 expulsion in place and, along with senators John Cornyn and Ted Cruz, wrote to Homeland Security Secretary Alejandro Mayorkas and Health and Human Services Secretary Xavier Becerra arguing that the removal of Title 42 would encourage illegal immigration at the southern border.

In 2022, Gonzales argued that while the Remain in Mexico policy enacted by the Trump administration had flaws, it had been an effective strategy to prevent illegal immigration and asylum fraud and that repealing laws on illegal immigration and off-soil asylum processing had led to cases such as the trailer deaths in San Antonio earlier that year. In response to the repeal of the Remain in Mexico policy under Biden, Gonzales called for an increase in immigration judges to process asylum cases "in days, not years." He supports the expansion and simplification of work visas to reform legal immigration.

=== LGBT issues ===
On July 19, 2022, Gonzales and 46 other House Republicans voted for the Respect for Marriage Act, which repealed the Defense of Marriage Act. It would require each state to recognize any marriage performed in another state, and codify same-sex marriage and Obergefell v. Hodges into federal law. It was signed into law by President Biden on December 13, 2022.

=== Fiscal Responsibility Act of 2023 ===
Gonzales was among 71 House Republicans who voted against final passage of the Fiscal Responsibility Act of 2023.

== Personal life ==
Gonzales and his wife, Angel, have six children. Angel served as the treasurer and custodian of records for Gonzales's campaign. He is Catholic.

== Electoral history ==
2020 Texas's 23rd congressional district election
Party	Candidate	Votes	%
Republican	Tony Gonzales	149,395	50.6
Democratic	Gina Ortiz Jones	137,693	46.6
Libertarian	Beto Villela	8,369	2.8
Total votes		295,457	100
Republican hold			

2022 Texas's 23rd congressional district election
Party	Candidate	Votes	%
Republican	Tony Gonzales (incumbent)	116,649	55.8
Democratic	John Lira	80,947	38.7
Independent	Frank Lopez Jr.	11,180	5.3
Total votes		208,776	100.0
Republican hold			

2024 Texas's 23rd congressional district election
Party	Candidate	Votes	%
Republican	Tony Gonzales (incumbent)	180,720	62.30
Democratic	Santos Limon	109,373	37.70
Total votes		290,093	100.00
Republican hold			

== See also ==
- List of Hispanic and Latino Americans in the United States Congress
- List of federal political scandals in the United States

U.S. House of Representatives
Preceded by Will Hurd	Member of the U.S. House of Representatives from Texas's 23rd congressional district 2021–2026	Succeeded by Katy Padilla Stout; Elect
Preceded by Mario Díaz-Balart	Chair of the Congressional Hispanic Conference; 2023–2026; Served alongside: Mario Díaz-Balart (2023–2025)	Succeeded by Mario Díaz-Balart
U.S. order of precedence (ceremonial)
Preceded by Van Taylor as Former U.S. Representative	Order of precedence of the United States as Former U.S. Representative	Succeeded by Edward Mezvinsky as Former U.S. Representative
