= Mexico–United States border =

International border in North America

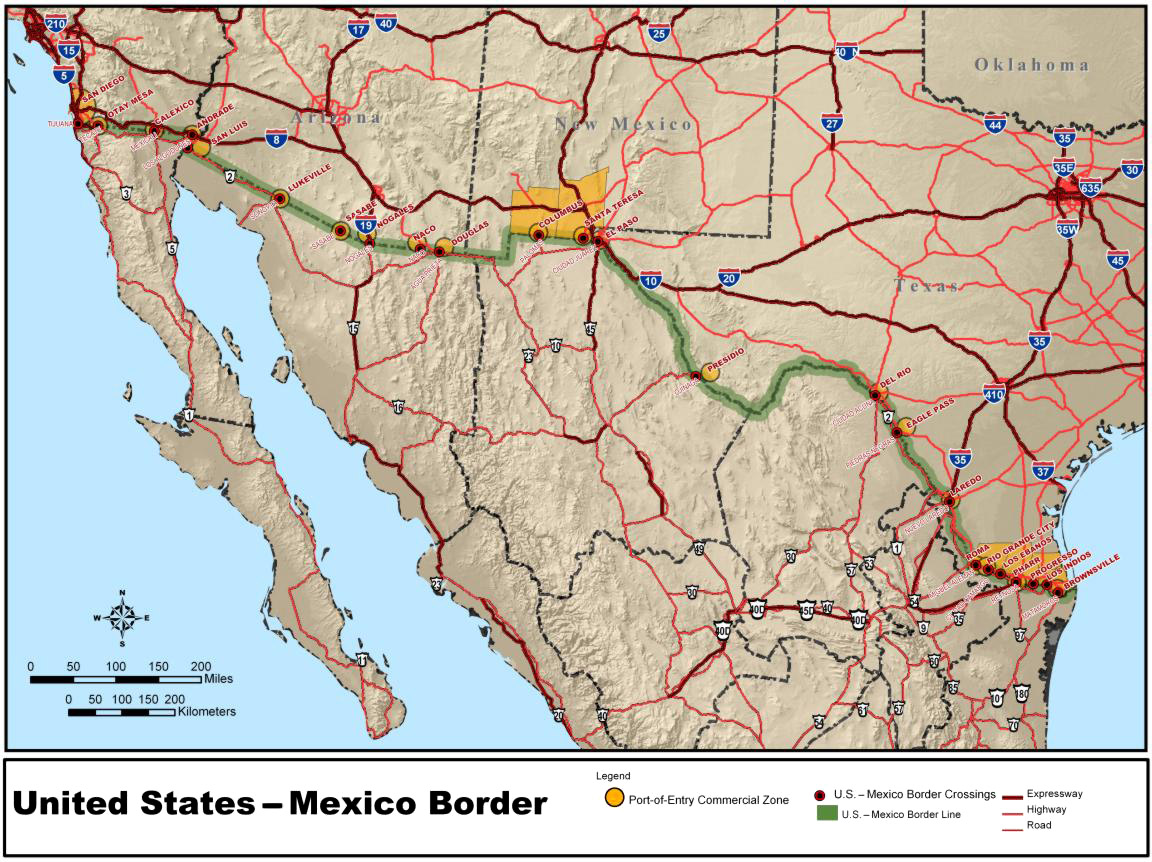
- The border between Mexico and the United States spans six Mexican states and four U.S. states.

Characteristics
- Entities: Mexico; United States
- Length: 3,145 kilometers (1,954 mi)

History
- Established: September 28, 1821; 205 years ago Declaration of Independence (Mexico)
- Current shape: April 18, 1972; 54 years ago Boundary Treaty of 1970
- Treaties: Adams–Onís Treaty, Treaty of Limits, Treaty of Guadalupe Hidalgo, Gadsden Purchase
- Notes: It is the busiest border in the Western Hemisphere.

A typical plaque constructed by the International Boundary and Water Commission and mounted at the exact location of the border

The international boundary separating Mexico and United States extends from the Pacific Ocean to the Gulf of Mexico. The border traverses a variety of terrains, ranging from urban areas to deserts. It is the most frequently crossed border in the world, with approximately 350 million documented crossings annually. Illegal crossing of the border to enter the United States has caused the Mexico–United States border crisis. It is one of two international borders that the United States has, the other being the northern Canada–United States border; Mexico has two other borders: with Belize and with Guatemala.

The vast majority of the current border was decided after the Mexican–American War (1846–1848). Most of the border is situated along the Rio Grande River, which marks the boundary between Texas and northeastern Mexico. Four American Sun Belt states border Mexico: California, Arizona, New Mexico and Texas. One definition of Northern Mexico includes only the six Mexican states that border the U.S.: Baja California, Chihuahua, Coahuila, Nuevo León, Sonora and Tamaulipas. The total length of the continental border is 3,145 kilometers (1,954 miles).

From the Gulf of Mexico, it follows the course of the Rio Grande (Río Bravo del Norte) to the border crossing at Ciudad Juárez, Chihuahua, and El Paso, Texas. Westward from El Paso–Juárez, it crosses vast tracts of the Chihuahuan and Sonoran deserts to the Colorado River Delta and San Diego–Tijuana, before reaching the Pacific Ocean.

== Geography ==
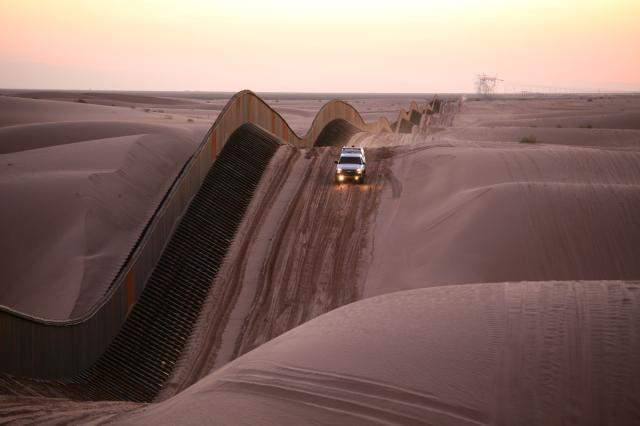
U.S. Border Patrol at Algodones Sand Dunes, California. The fence on the U.S.–Mexican border is a special construction of narrow, 4.6 m (15 ft) tall elements that are movable vertically. This way, they can be lifted on top of the ever-shifting dunes.

The Mexico–United States border extends 3,145 kilometers (1,954 miles), in addition to the maritime boundaries of 29 km (18 mi) into the Pacific Ocean and 19 km (12 mi) into the Gulf of Mexico. It is the tenth-longest border between two countries in the world.

The Mexico–U.S. border begins at the Initial Point of Boundary Between U.S. and Mexico, which is set one marine league (three nautical miles) south of the southernmost point of San Diego Bay. The border then proceeds for 227 km (141 mi) in a straight line towards the confluence of the Colorado River and Gila River. The border continues southwards along the Colorado River for 39 km (24 mi), until it reaches a point 32 km (20 mi) south of the Gila River confluence. The border then follows a series of lines and parallels totaling 859 km (534 mi). First, it follows a straight line from the Colorado River to the intersection of the 31° 20′ parallel north and the 111th meridian west. It then proceeds eastwards along the 31° 20′ parallel north up to a meridian 161 km (100 mi) west of the point where the Rio Grande crosses the 31° 47′ parallel north, It then proceeds northwards along that meridian up to the 31° 47′ parallel north and then eastwards along that parallel until it meets the Rio Grande.

According to the International Boundary and Water Commission, the continental border then follows the middle of the Rio Grande—according to the 1848 Treaty of Guadalupe Hidalgo between the two nations, "along the deepest channel" (also known as the thalweg)—a distance of 2,020 km (1,255 mi) to its mouth at the Gulf of Mexico. The Rio Grande frequently meanders along the Texas–Mexico border. As a result, the U.S. and Mexico have a treaty by which the Rio Grande is maintained as the border, with new cut-offs and islands being transferred to the other nation as necessary. The Boundary Treaty of 1970 between Mexico and the U.S. settled all outstanding boundary disputes and uncertainties related to the Rio Grande border. The U.S. states along the border, from west to east, are California, Arizona, New Mexico, and Texas. The Mexican states along the border are Baja California, Sonora, Chihuahua, Coahuila, Nuevo León, and Tamaulipas. Among the U.S. states, Texas has the longest stretch of border with Mexico, while California has the shortest. Among the states in Mexico, Chihuahua has the longest border with the U.S., while Nuevo León has the shortest. Along the border are 23 U.S. counties and 39 Mexican municipalities.

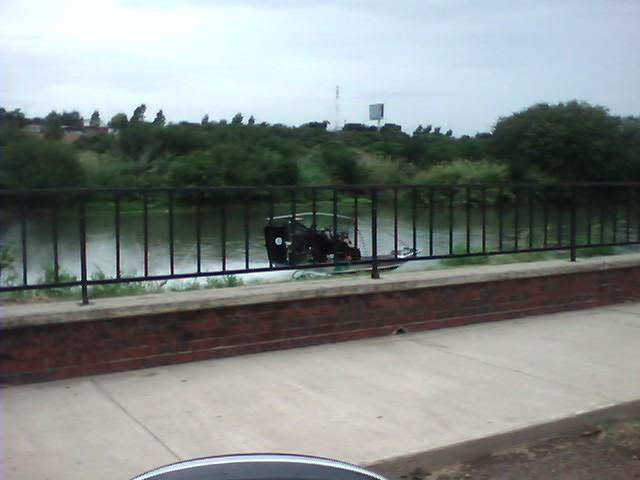
Border Patrol patrolling the Rio Grande in an airboat in Laredo, Texas

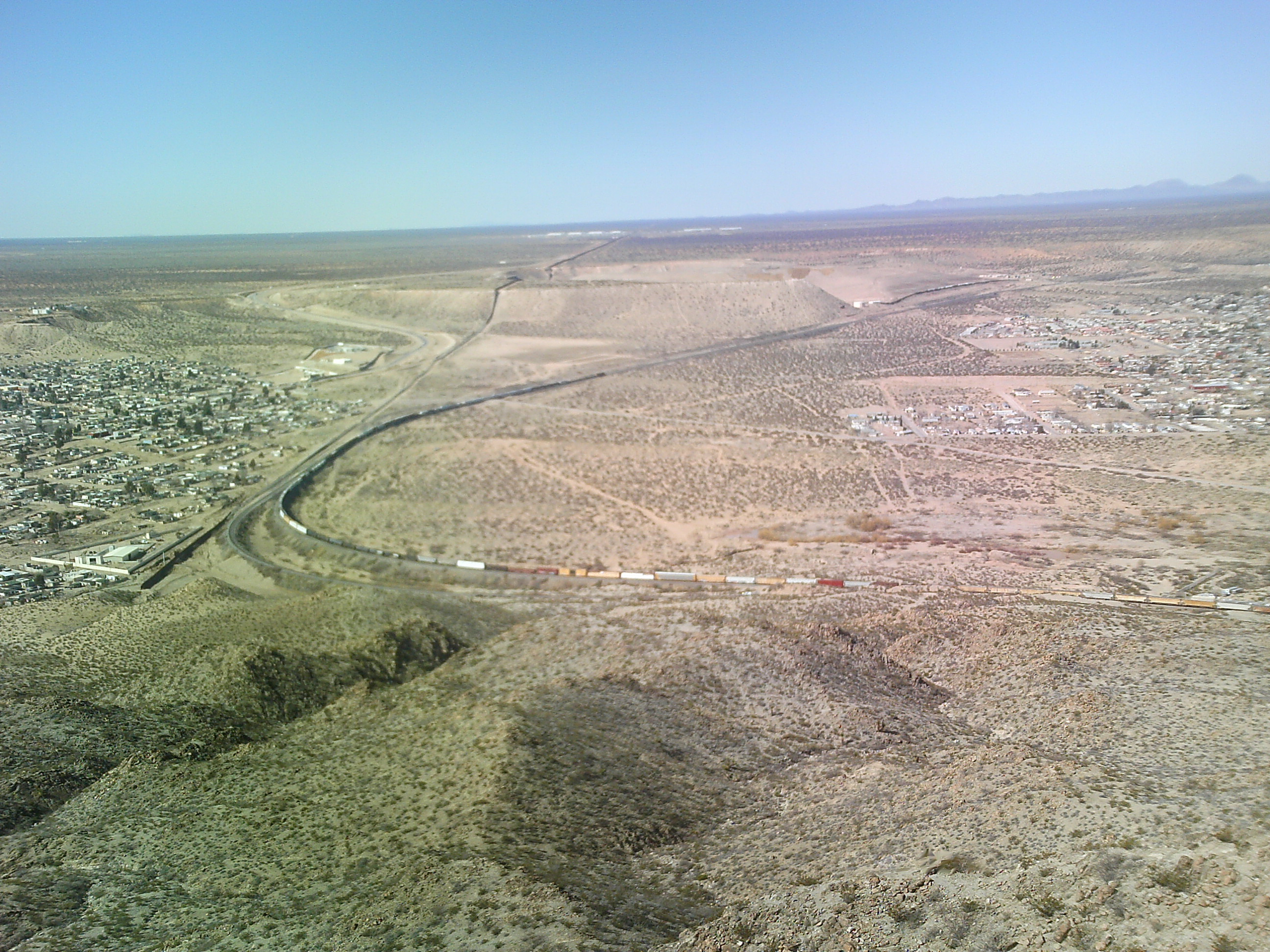
The start of the border fence in the state of New Mexico – just west of El Paso, Texas

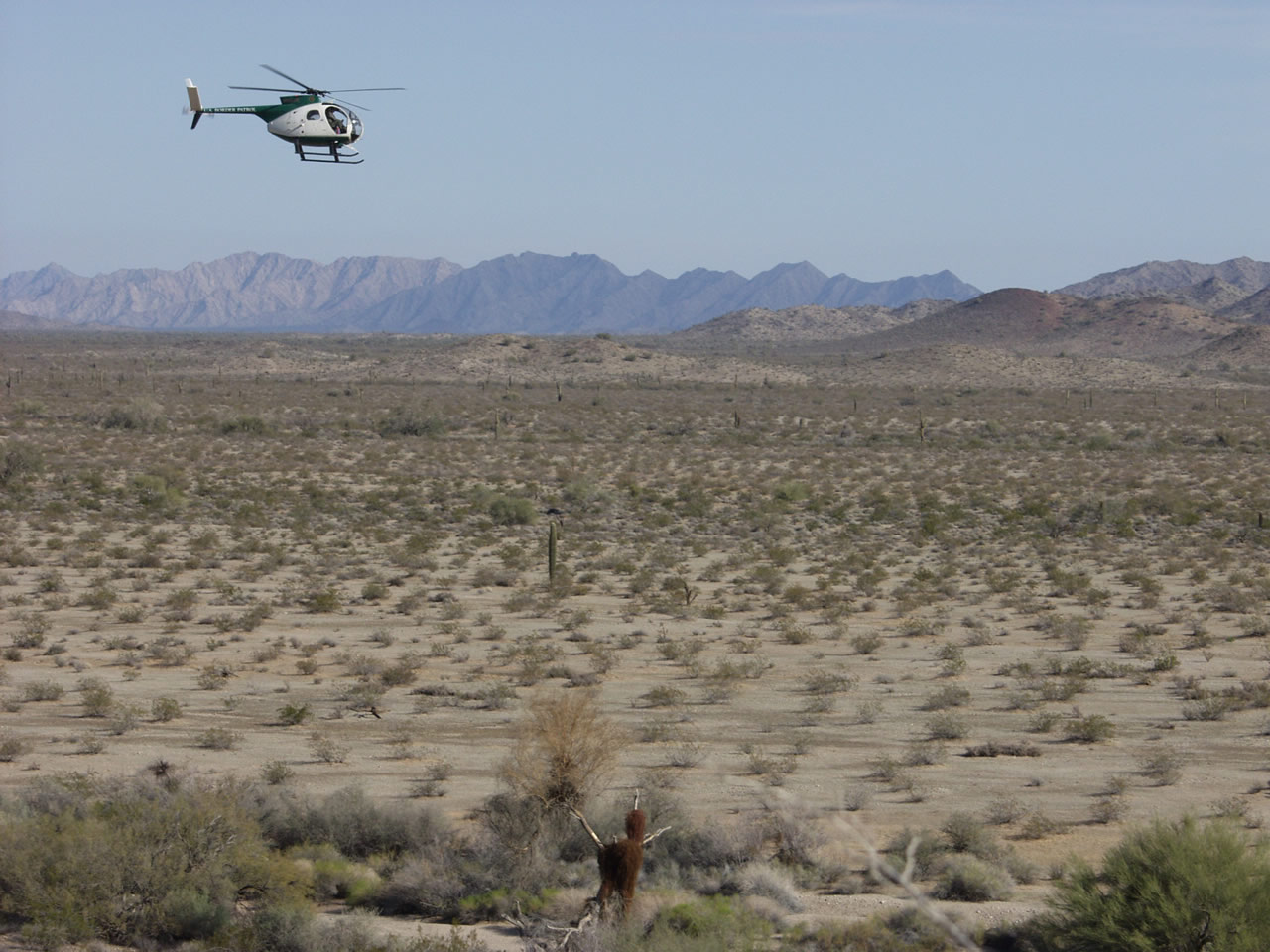
U.S. Border Patrol helicopter along El Camino del Diablo, Arizona–Sonora border, 2004

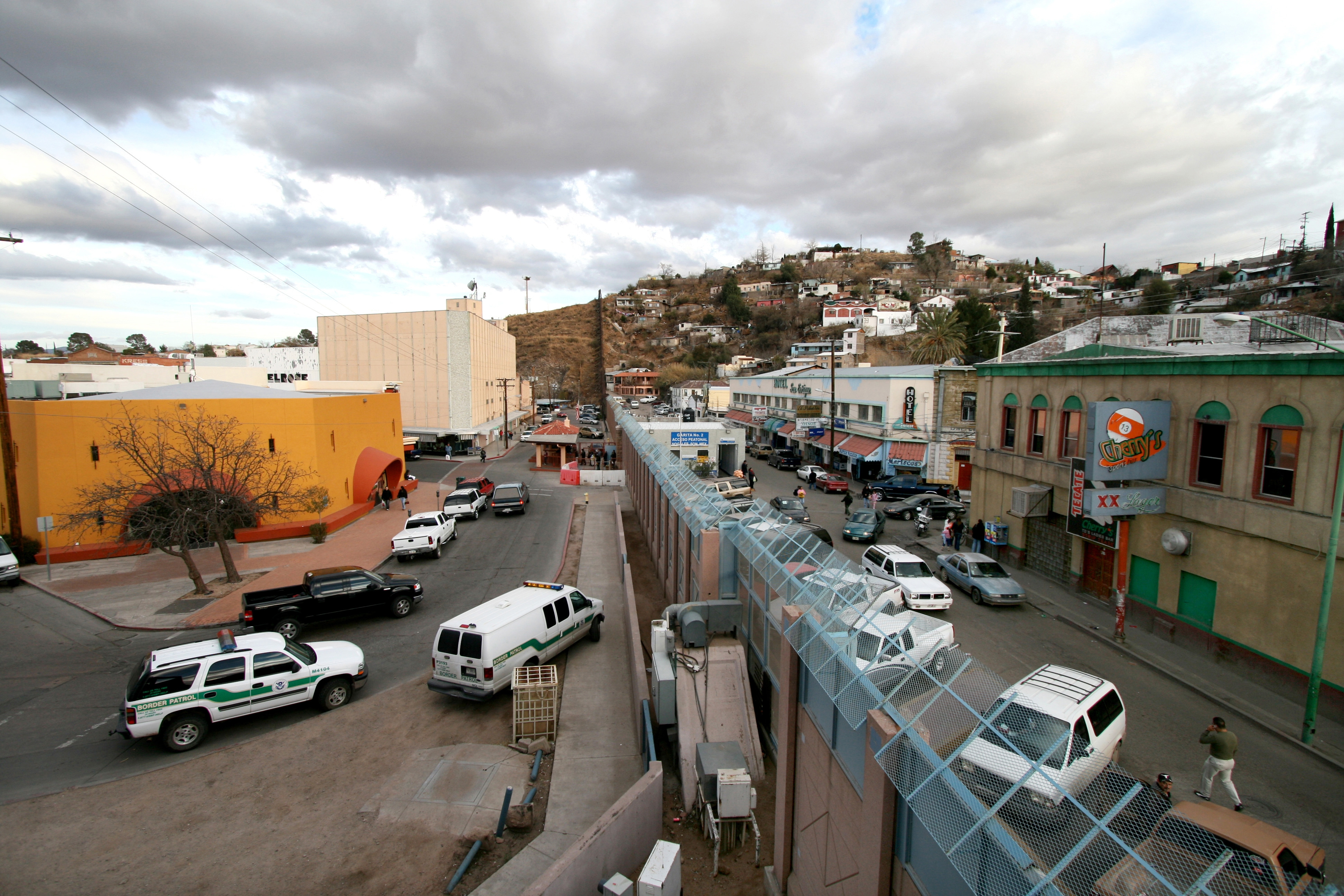
Border between Nogales, Arizona, on the left, and Nogales, Sonora, on the right

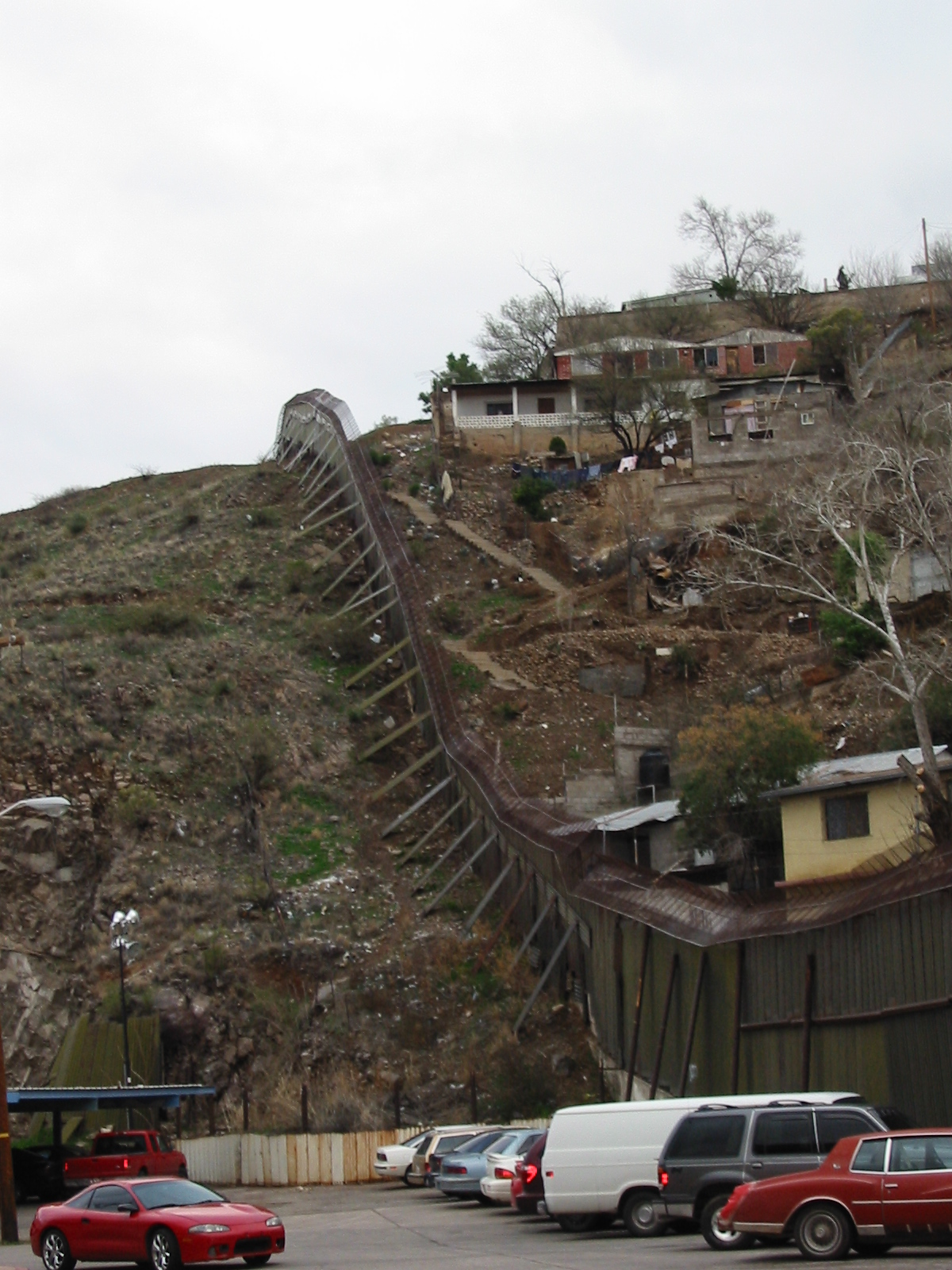
On the left: Nogales, Arizona; on the right, Nogales, Sonora

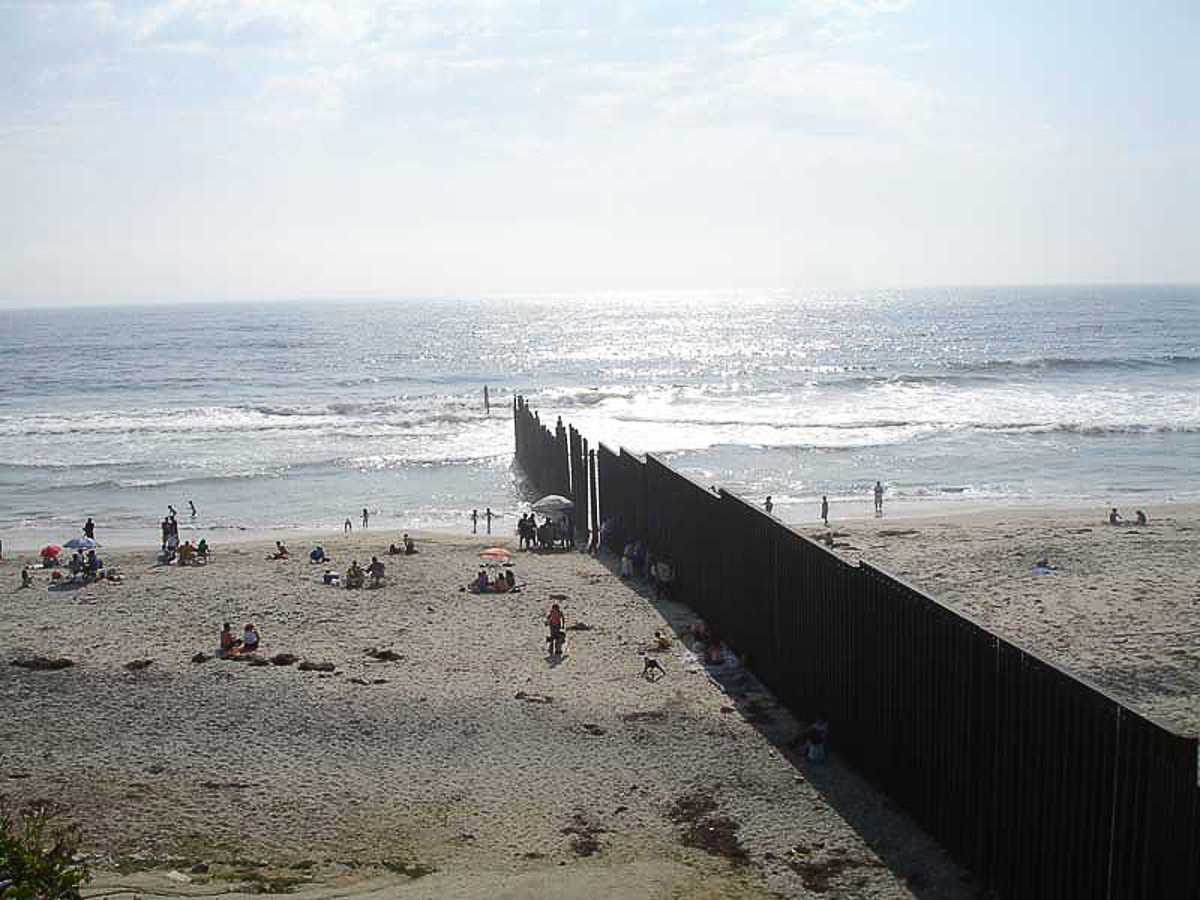
Beach in Tijuana at the border in 2006

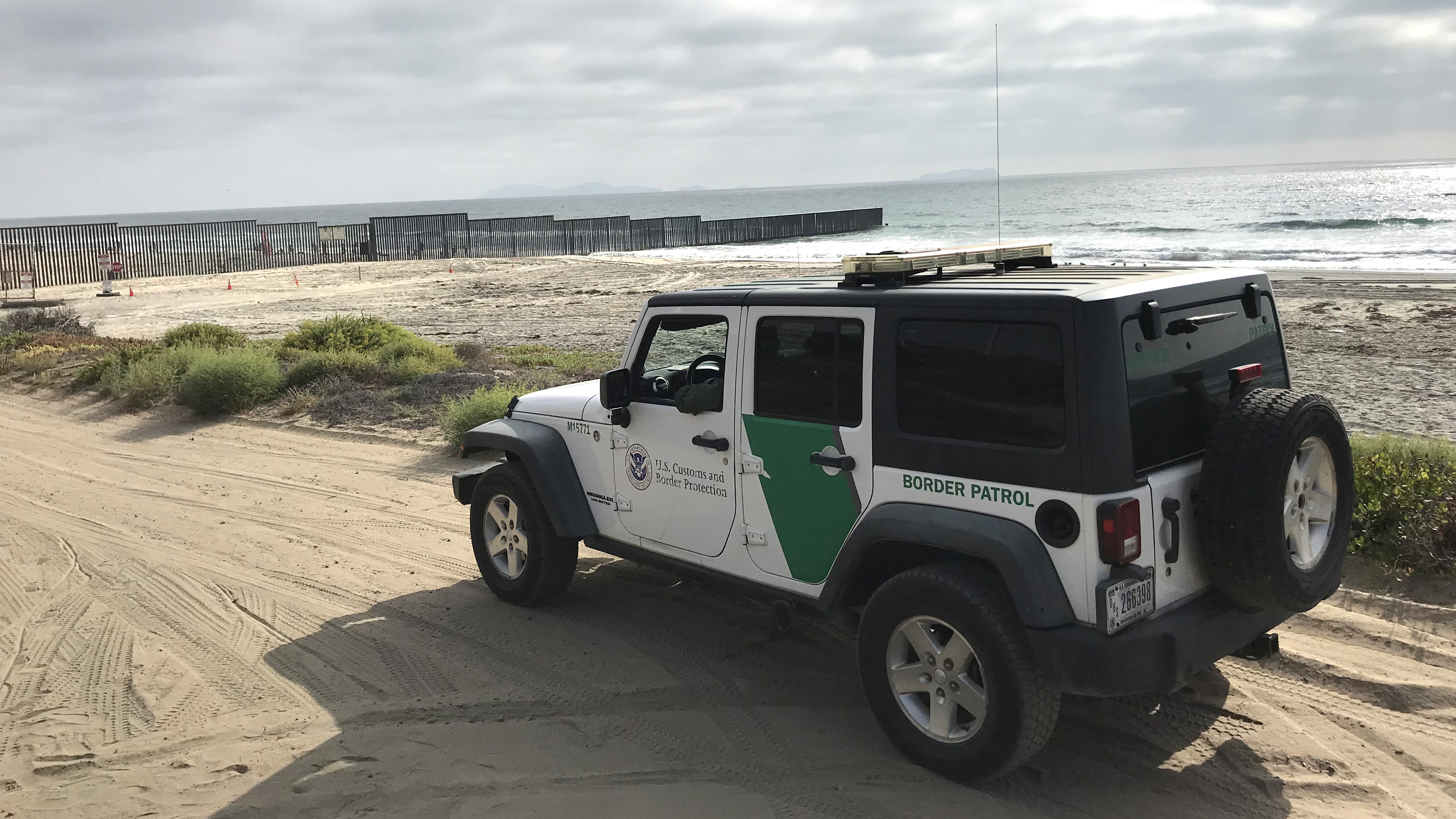
A CBP Border Patrol vehicle sitting near the Mexico–U.S. border

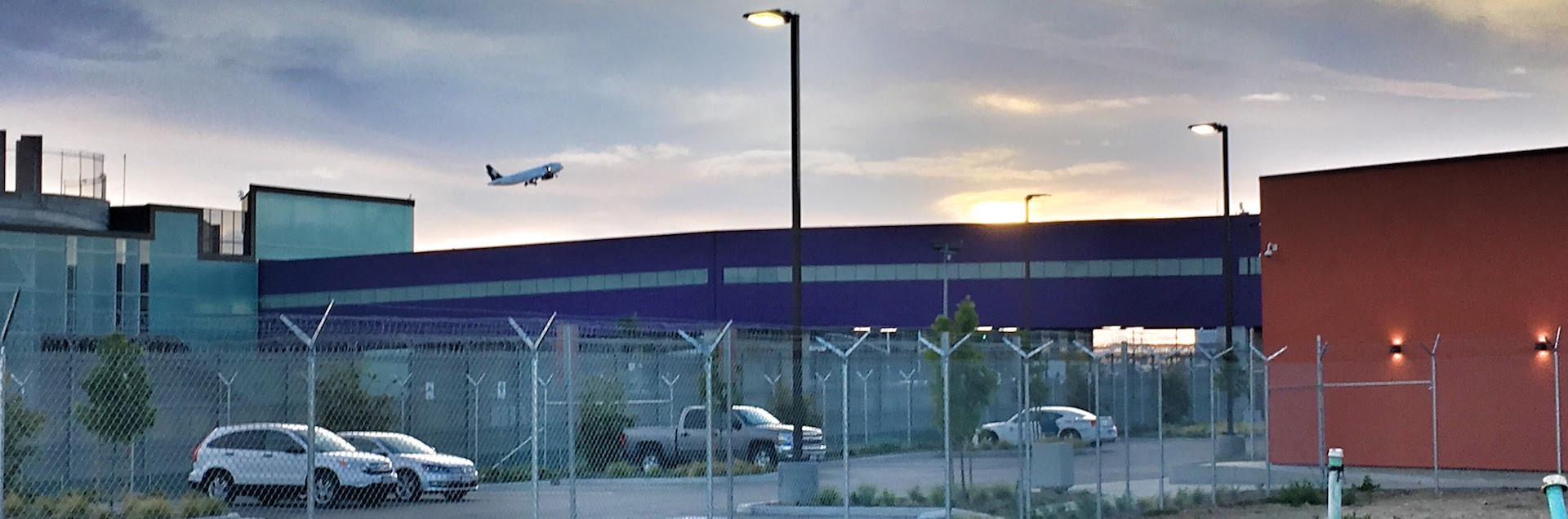
View of the Cross Border Xpress (CBX) bridge from parking lot on U.S. side, with Tijuana Airport on the left and the CBX U.S. terminal on the right

== History ==
=== Before the Mexican–American War ===
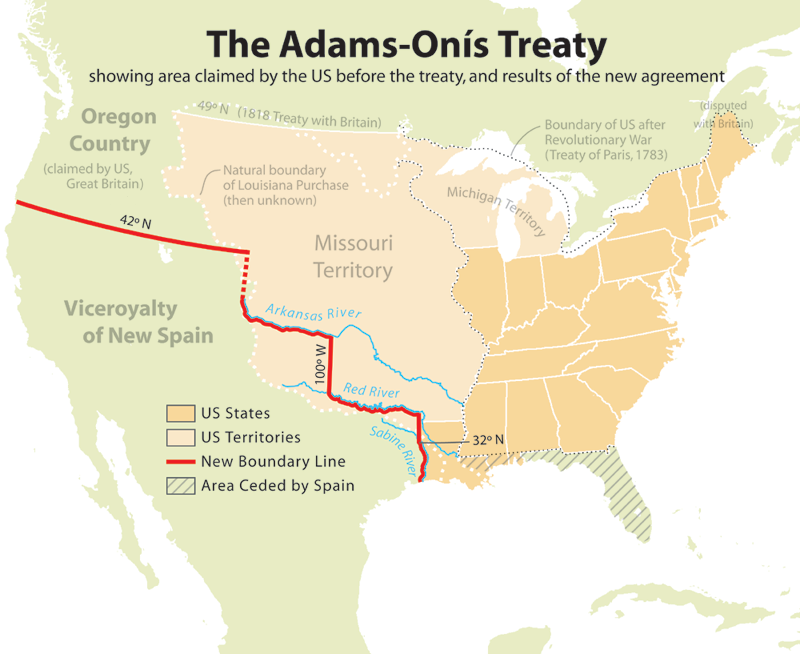
The US-New Spain/Mexico border from 1819 to 1836

In the mid-16th century, after the discovery of silver, settlers from various countries and backgrounds began to arrive in the area. This period of sparse settlement included colonizers from different backgrounds. The area was part of New Spain. In the early 19th century, the U.S. bought the lands known as the Louisiana Purchase from France and began to expand steadily westward.

After the 1803 Louisiana Purchase, the border between the U.S. and New Spain was not clearly defined. The border was established in 1819 by the Adams–Onís Treaty between the U.S. and Spain, which specified the northern and eastern borders. Mexico gained its independence from Spain, and the border was reaffirmed in the 1828 Treaty of Limits. Mexico attempted to create a buffer zone at the border that would prevent possible invasion from the north. The Mexican government encouraged thousands of its own citizens to settle in the region that is now known as Texas, and even offered inexpensive land to settlers from the U.S. in exchange for populating the area. The influx of people did not provide the defense that Mexico had hoped for, and instead Texas declared its independence in 1836, which lasted until 1845 when the U.S. annexed it.

=== Establishment of the present border ===
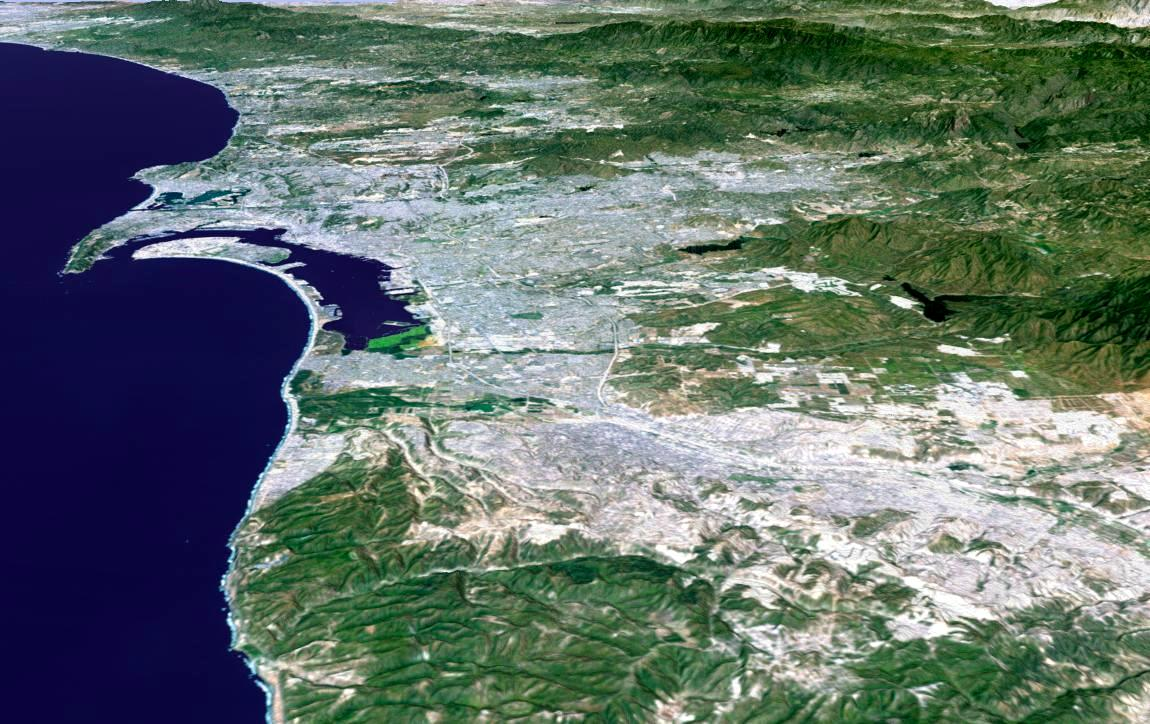
San Diego together with Tijuana creates the bi-national San Diego–Tijuana metropolitan area

The constant conflicts in the Texas region in the mid-19th century eventually led to the Mexican–American War, which began in 1846 and ended in 1848 with the Treaty of Guadalupe Hidalgo. In the terms of the peace treaty, Mexico lost more than 2,500,000 square kilometers (970,000 sq mi) of land, 55% of its territory, including all of what is today California, Arizona, New Mexico, Utah, Nevada and parts of what is Colorado, Wyoming, Kansas, and Oklahoma. In addition, all disputes over Texas and the disputed territory between the Rio Grande and Rio Nueces were abandoned. The exact border was established by surveyors from both countries, who interpreted the treaty as they completed the United States and Mexican Boundary Survey.

Five years later, the Gadsden Purchase completed the creation of the current U.S.–Mexico border. The purchase was initially to accommodate a planned railway right-of-way. These purchases left approximately 300,000 people living in the once-disputed lands, many of whom were Mexican nationals. Following the establishment of the current border, several towns sprang up along this boundary, and many of the Mexican citizens were given free land in the northern regions of Mexico in exchange for returning and repopulating the area.

=== Later history ===
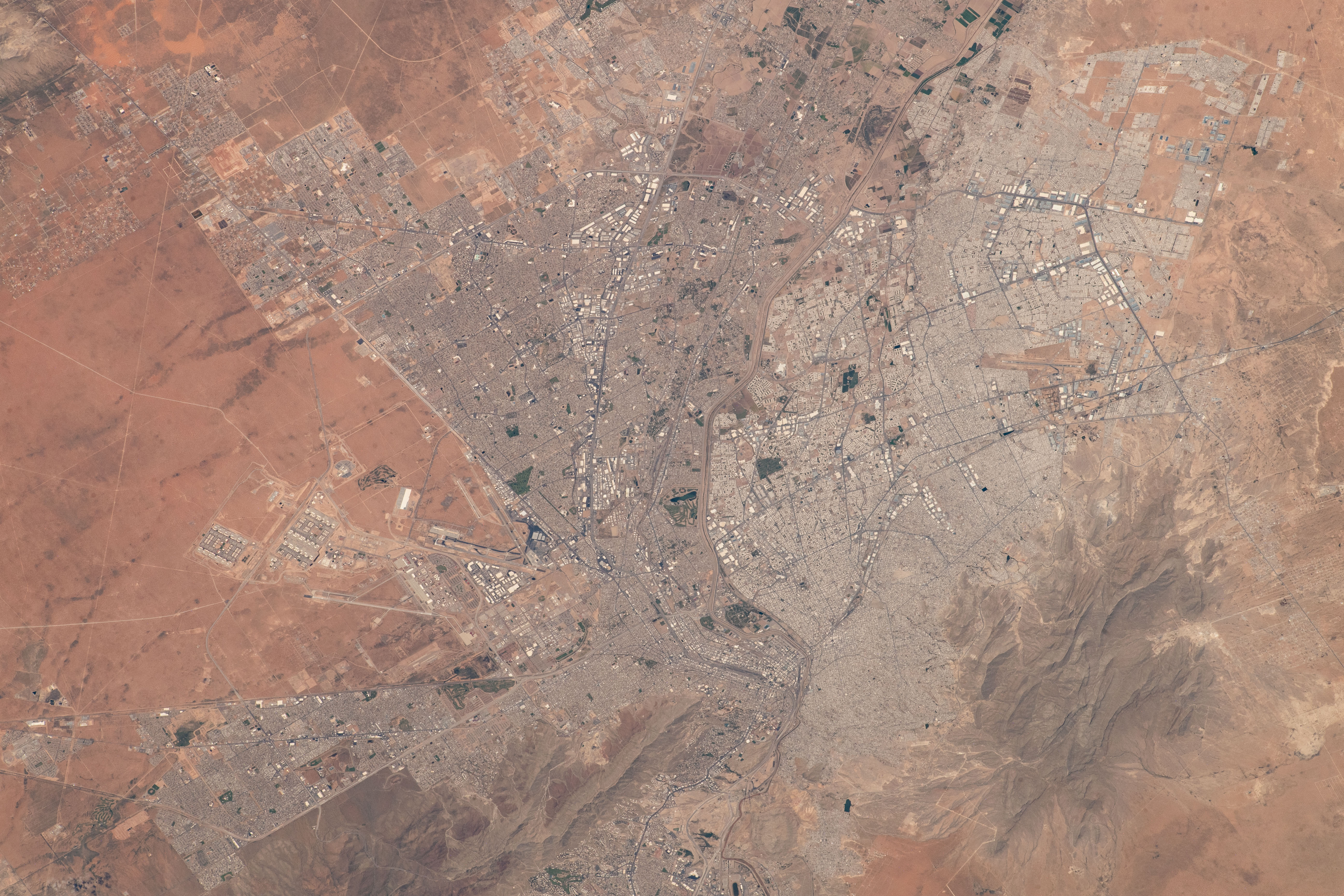
El Paso, Texas (left) and Ciudad Juárez, Chihuahua (right), taken on June 30, 2022, from the International Space Station with north oriented towards the bottom-left side. The Rio Grande appears as a thin line separating the two cities through the middle of the photograph. El Paso and Juarez make up the third-largest U.S. international metroplex after Detroit–Windsor and San Diego–Tijuana.

The Treaty of Guadalupe Hidalgo and another treaty in 1884 were the agreements originally responsible for the settlement of the international border, both of which specified that the middle of the Rio Grande was the border, irrespective of any alterations in the channels or banks. The Rio Grande shifted south between 1852 and 1868, with the most radical shift in the river occurring after a flood in 1864. By 1873, the moving river-center border had cut off approximately 2.4 square kilometers (590 acres) of Mexican territory in the El Paso-Juarez area, in effect transferring the land to the U.S. By a treaty negotiated in 1963, Mexico regained most of this land in what became known as the Chamizal dispute and transferred 1.07 km^{2} (260 acres) in return to the U.S. Border treaties are jointly administered by the International Boundary and Water Commission (IBWC), which was established in 1889 to maintain the border, allocate river waters between the two nations, and provide for flood control and water sanitation. Once viewed as a model of international cooperation, in recent decades the IBWC has been heavily criticized as an institutional anachronism, by-passed by modern social, environmental and political issues. In particular, jurisdictional issues regarding water rights in the Rio Grande Valley have continued to cause tension between farmers along the border, according to Mexican political scientist Armand Peschard-Sverdrup.

The economic development of the border region on the Mexican side of the border depended largely on its proximity to the U.S., because of its remoteness from commercial centers in Mexico. During the years of Mexican President Porfirio Díaz, between 1876 and 1910, the border communities boomed because of close ties to the U.S. and the Mexican government's support for financial investments from the U.S. Railroads were built that connected the northern Mexican states more to the U.S. than to Mexico, and the population grew tremendously. The mining industry also developed, as did the U.S.'s control of it. By the early 20th century, companies from the U.S. controlled 81% of the mining industry and had invested US$500 million in the Mexican economy overall, 25% of it in the border regions.

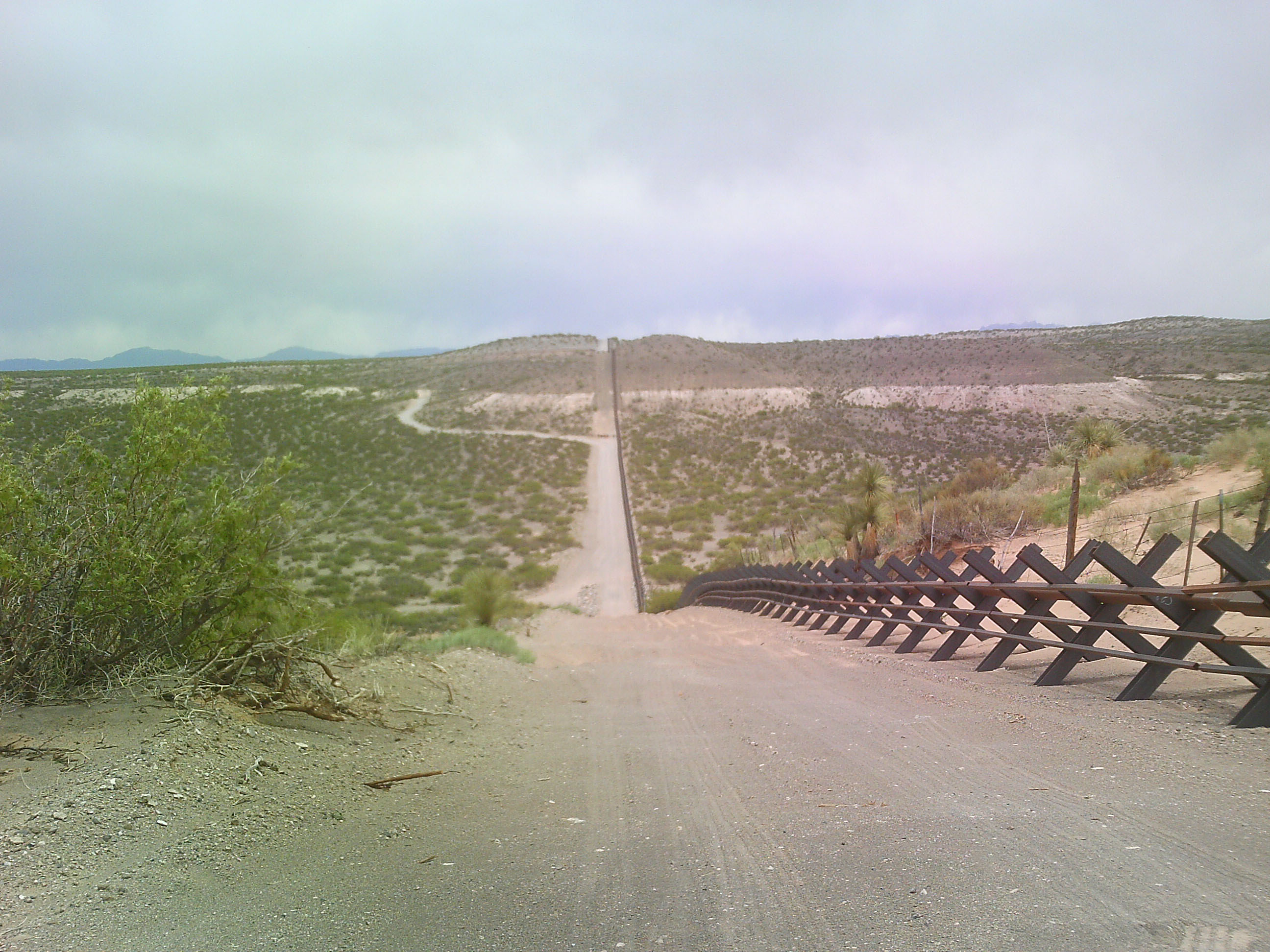
Vehicle barrier in the New Mexico desert, 2010

The U.S. Immigration Act of 1891 authorized the implementation of inspection stations at ports of entry along the Mexican and Canadian borders. The U.S. Immigration Act of 1917 required the passing of a literacy test and a head tax by Mexicans wanting to enter the U.S. legally; however, during World War I, when labor shortages grew, the provisions were temporarily suspended. The U.S. Immigration Act of 1924 established the U.S. Border Patrol.

The Mexican Revolution, caused at least partially by animosity toward foreign ownership of Mexican properties, began in 1910. The revolution increased the political instability in Mexico but did not significantly slow U.S. investment. It did reduce economic development within Mexico, however, and the border regions reflected this. As the infrastructure of communities on the U.S. side continued to improve, the Mexican side began to fall behind in the construction and maintenance of important transportation networks and systems necessary for municipal development.

Although the Mexican Revolution caused insecurity in Mexico, it also strained U.S.–Mexico relations. With the Mexican Revolution lasting for 10 years, ending in 1920, and World War I simultaneously occurring between 1914 and 1918, the division between the U.S. and Mexico began to polarize the two nations. Constant battles and raids along the border made both authorities nervous about borderland security. The Zimmerman Telegram, a diplomatic cable sent by Germany but intercepted and decrypted by British intelligence, was meant to bait Mexico into war with the U.S. to reconquer what was taken from them during the Mexican-American War. This inspired the U.S. Federal Bureau of Investigation to monitor suspicious activities and potential violence at the border. Within 10 years, frequent provocations caused border towns to transform into battlefields, which intensified transborder restrictions, brought federal soldiers to patrol the border, and caused the construction of fences and barriers between border towns. When the battles concluded, restrictions for crossing the border were relaxed, and most soldiers were sent home; however, the fences remained as a physical reminder of the division between the two nations. As years passed, more fences and higher barriers were established as attention focused on the boundary demarcation between the U.S. and Mexico. The first international bridge was the Brownsville & Matamoros International Bridge, built in 1910. The first barrier built by the U.S. was between 1909 and 1911 in California; the first barrier built by Mexico was likely in 1918. Barriers were extended in the 1920s and 1940s.

The Banco Convention of 1905 between the U.S. and Mexico allowed, in the event of sudden changes in the course of the Rio Grande (as by flooding), for the border to be altered to follow the new course. The sudden changes often created bancos (land surrounded by bends in the river that became segregated from either country by a cutoff, often caused by rapid accretion or avulsion of the alluvial channel), especially in the lower Rio Grande Valley. When these bancos are created, the International Boundary and Water Commission investigates whether land previously belonging to the U.S. or Mexico is to be considered on the other side of the border. In all cases of these adjustments along the Rio Grande under the 1905 convention, which occurred on 37 different dates from 1910 to 1976, the transferred land was small (ranging from one to 646 acres) and uninhabited. The Rio Grande Rectification Treaty of 1933 straightened and stabilized the river boundary through the highly developed El Paso-Juárez valley. Numerous parcels of land were transferred between the two countries during the construction period, 1935–1938. At the end, each nation had ceded an equal area of land to the other.

The Boundary Treaty of 1970 transferred an area of Mexican territory to the U.S., near Presidio and Hidalgo, Texas, to build flood control channels. In exchange, the U.S. ceded other land to Mexico, including five parcels near Presidio, the Horcón Tract, and Beaver Island near Roma, Texas. On November 24, 2009, the U.S. ceded 6 islands in the Rio Grande to Mexico. At the same time, Mexico ceded 3 islands and 2 bancos to the U.S. This transfer, which had been pending for 20 years, was the first application of Article III of the 1970 Boundary Treaty. The US side of the border region was 73% Hispanic in 1980, rising to 85% in 2000.

== Border crossing checkpoints ==
The border separating Mexico and the U.S. is the most frequently crossed international boundary in the world, with approximately 350 million legal crossings taking place annually. Border crossings take place by roads, pedestrian walkways, railroads, and ferries. From west to east, below is a list of the border city "twinnings": cross-border municipalities connected by one or more legal border crossings.

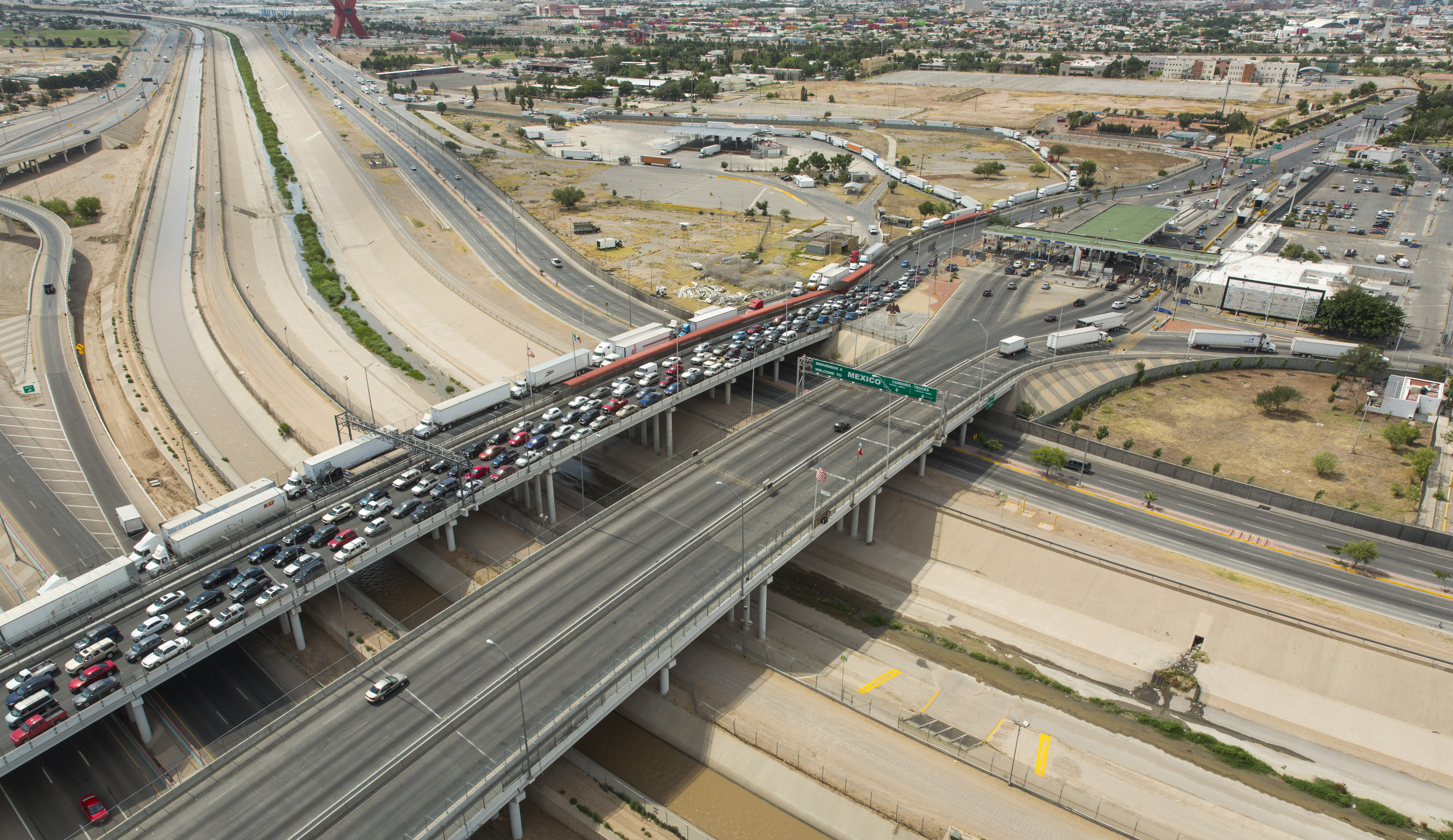
Going into Mexico from El Paso, Texas, U.S.

- San Diego, California (San Ysidro) – Tijuana, Baja California (San Diego–Tijuana Metro)
- Cross Border Xpress, Otay Mesa, California – Tijuana International Airport, Baja California
- Otay Mesa, California – Tijuana, Baja California
- Tecate, California – Tecate, Baja California
- Calexico, California – Mexicali, Baja California
- Andrade, California – Los Algodones, Baja California
- San Luis, Arizona – San Luis Río Colorado, Sonora
- Lukeville, Arizona – Sonoyta, Sonora
- Sasabe, Arizona – Altar, Sonora
- Nogales, Arizona – Nogales, Sonora
- Naco, Arizona – Naco, Sonora
- Douglas, Arizona – Agua Prieta, Sonora
- Antelope Wells, New Mexico – El Berrendo, Chihuahua
- Columbus, New Mexico – Palomas, Chihuahua
- Santa Teresa, New Mexico – San Jerónimo, Chihuahua
- El Paso, Texas – Ciudad Juárez, Chihuahua (El Paso-Juárez)
- Fabens, Texas – Práxedis G. Guerrero, Chihuahua municipality
- Fort Hancock, Texas – El Porvenir, Chihuahua
- Presidio, Texas – Ojinaga, Chihuahua
- Del Rio, Texas – Ciudad Acuña, Coahuila
- Eagle Pass, Texas – Piedras Negras, Coahuila
- Laredo, Texas – Nuevo Laredo, Tamaulipas
- Laredo, Texas – Colombia, Nuevo León
- Falcon Heights, Texas – Presa Falcón, Tamaulipas
- Roma, Texas – Ciudad Miguel Alemán, Tamaulipas
- Rio Grande City, Texas – Ciudad Camargo, Tamaulipas
- Los Ebanos, Texas – Gustavo Díaz Ordaz, Tamaulipas
- Mission, Texas – Reynosa, Tamaulipas
- Hidalgo, Texas – Reynosa, Tamaulipas
- Pharr, Texas – Reynosa, Tamaulipas
- Donna, Texas – Río Bravo, Tamaulipas
- Progreso, Texas – Nuevo Progreso, Tamaulipas
- Los Indios, Texas – Matamoros, Tamaulipas
- Brownsville, Texas – Matamoros, Tamaulipas

The total population of the borderlands—defined as those counties and municipios lining the border on either side—stands at some 12 million people.

=== Tijuana-San Ysidro border ===
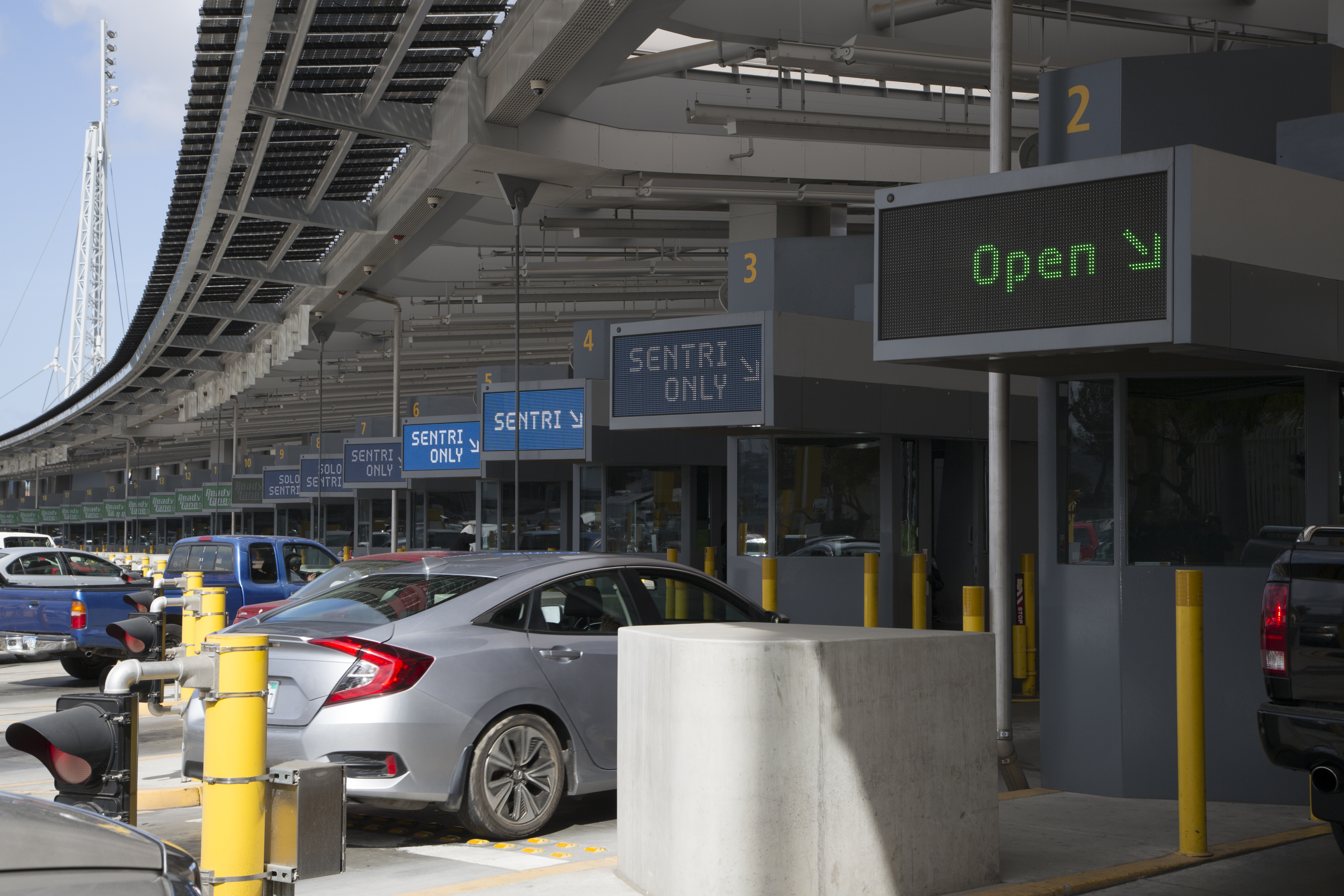
San Ysidro Port of Entry through vehicle

The San Ysidro Port of Entry is located between San Ysidro, California and Tijuana, Baja California. Approximately 50,000 vehicles and 25,000 pedestrians use this entry daily. In the U.S., I-5 crosses directly to Tijuana, and the highway's southern terminus is this crossing. In 2005, more than 17 million vehicles and 50 million people entered the U.S. through San Ysidro. Among those who enter the U.S. through San Ysidro are transfronterizos, American citizens who live in Mexico and attend school in the U.S.

It has influenced the everyday lifestyle of people who live in these border towns. Along the coast of Baja California, there are neighborhoods of Americans living in Tijuana, Rosarito Beach, and Ensenada, whose residents commute to the U.S. daily to work. Additionally, many Mexicans also enter the U.S. to commute daily to work. In 1999, 7.6% of the labor force of Tijuana was employed in San Diego.

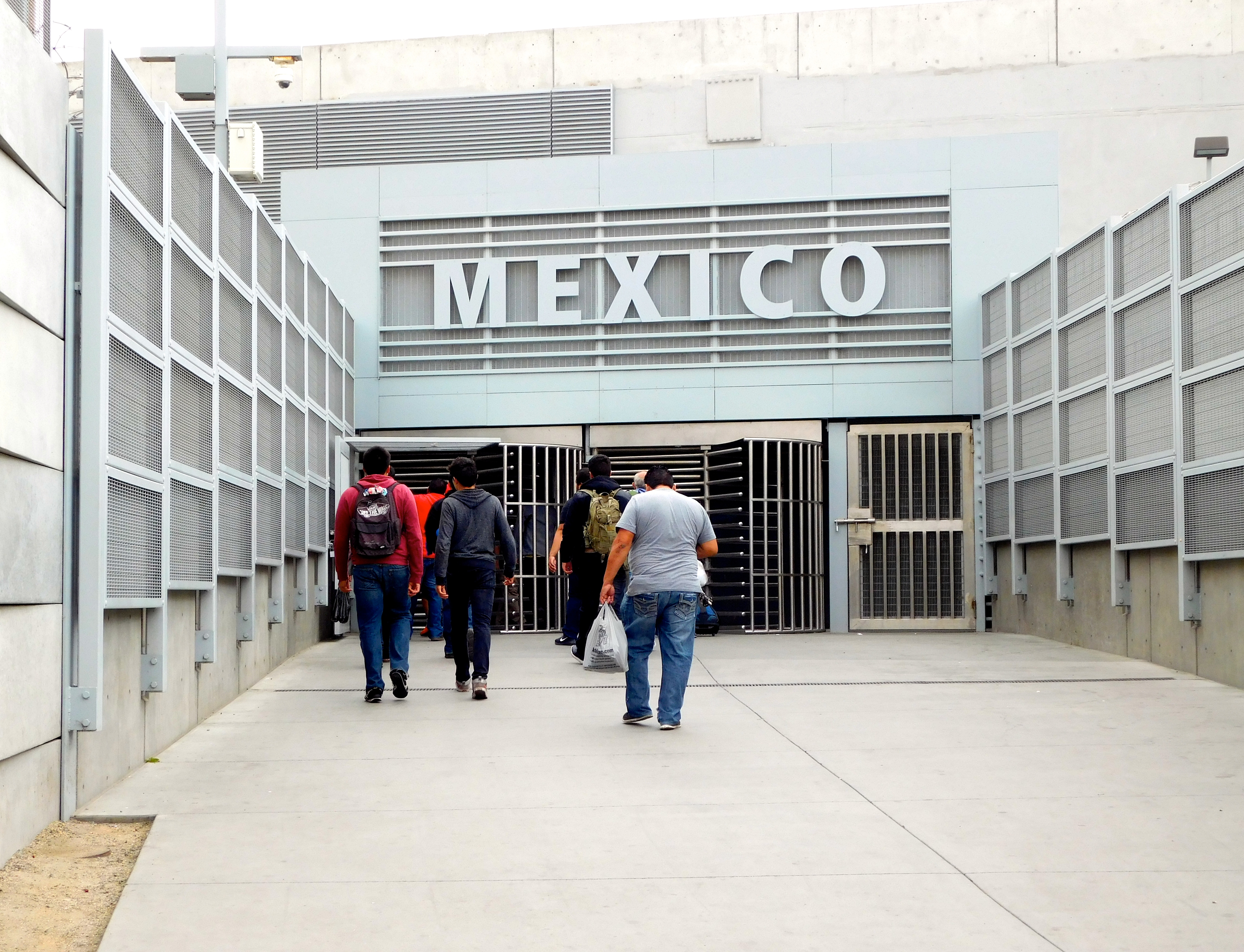
Entrance to Mexico from San Diego, California, United States of America

The average wait time to cross into the U.S. is approximately an hour. The thousands of vehicles that transit through the border every day is causing air pollution in San Ysidro and Tijuana. The emission of carbon monoxide (CO) and other vehicle related air contaminants have been linked to health complications such as cardiovascular disease, lung cancer, birth outcomes, premature death, obesity, asthma and other respiratory diseases. The high levels of traffic congestion and the extended wait times have affected the mental health, stress levels, and aggressive behavior of the people who cross frequently. The San Ysidro border is heavily policed, separated by three walls, border patrol agents and the U.S. Immigration and Customs Enforcement.

Tijuana is the next target for San Diegan developers because of its economy, lower cost of living, low prices, and proximity to San Diego. While this would benefit the tourist aspect of the city, it is damaging to low-income residents who will no longer be able to afford the cost of living in Tijuana. Tijuana is home to many deportees from the U.S., many who have lost everything and do not have an income to rely on and are now in a new city in which they have to quickly adapt to survive. San Diego developers would bring many benefits to Tijuana, but deportees and the poor run the risk of being impacted by the gentrification of Tijuana.

In fiscal year 2023, the San Diego sector experienced a significant increase in migrant encounters, averaging approximately 20,000 per month. Seasonal spikes were observed, with monthly encounters ranging from around 16,000 to over 28,000. This activity reflects the sector's ongoing role as a major corridor for migration, influenced by shifting enforcement strategies, regional instability, and evolving U.S. border policies.

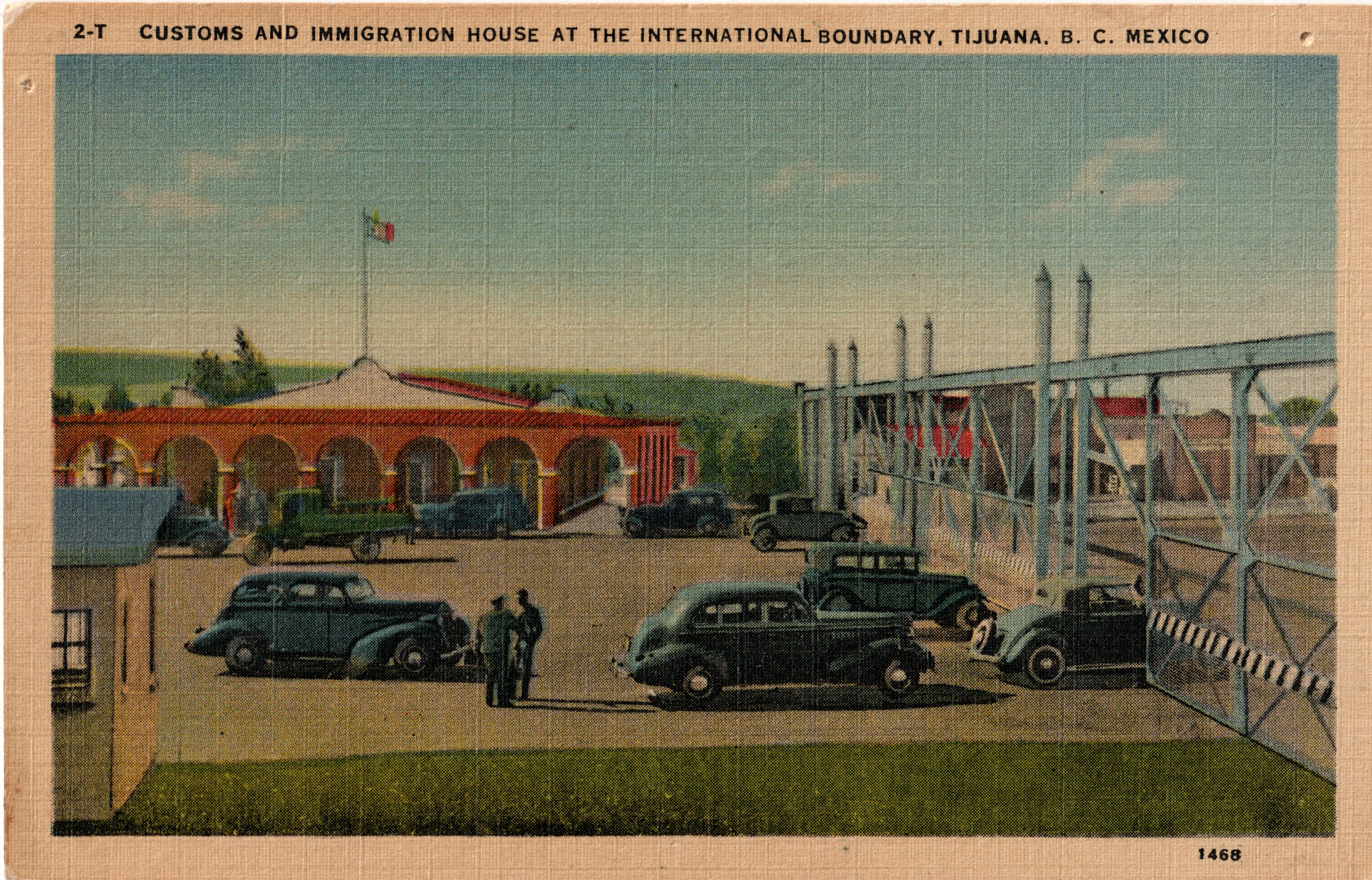
Customs and immigration house at the international boundary, Tijuana, BC, Mexico circa 1940s

=== Western Hemisphere Travel Initiative ===
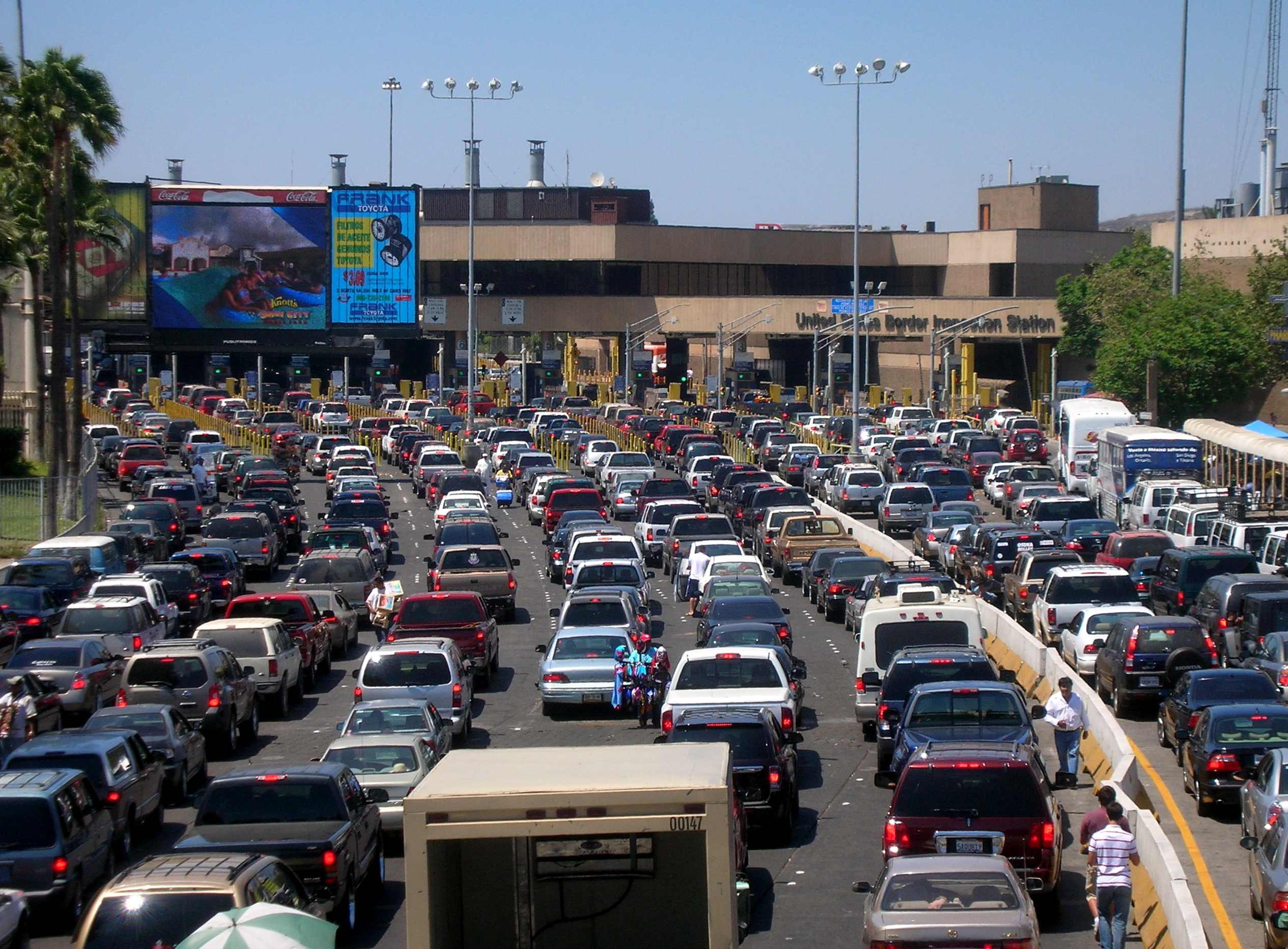
The San Ysidro border crossing between San Diego and Tijuana

In late 2006, the U.S. Department of Homeland Security (DHS) announced a rule regarding new identification requirements for U.S. citizens and international travelers entering the U.S., implemented on January 23, 2007. This final rule and first phase of the WHTI specifies nine forms of identification, one of which is required to enter the U.S. by air: a valid passport; a passport card; a state enhanced driver's license or state enhanced non-driver ID card (available in Michigan, New York, Vermont, and Washington) approved by the Secretary of Homeland Security; a trusted traveler program card (Global Entry, NEXUS, FAST, or SENTRI); an enhanced tribal identification card; a Native American Tribal Photo Identification Card; Form I-872– American Indian Card; a valid Merchant Mariner Document when traveling in conjunction with official maritime business; or a valid U.S. military identification card when traveling on official orders.

In August 2015, Mexico began enforcing a rule that all foreign citizens who plan to stay in the country for more than seven days or are travelling on business will have to pay a 330 pesos ($21) fee and show their passport.

=== Veterinary inspections ===
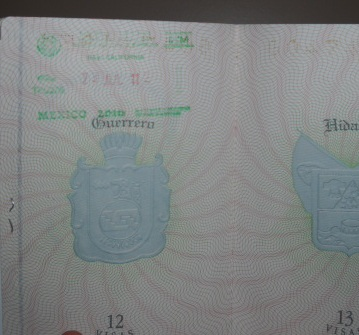
Passport stamp upon arrival in Tijuana, Baja California land border crossing

When animals are imported from one country to another, there is the possibility that diseases and parasites can move with them. Thus, most countries impose animal health regulations on the import of animals. Most animals imported to the U.S. must be accompanied by import permits obtained in advance from the U.S. Department of Agriculture's Animal and Plant Health Inspection Service (APHIS) and/or health certification papers from the country of origin. Veterinary inspections are often required, and are available only at designated ports; advance contact with port veterinarians is recommended. Animals crossing the U.S.–Mexico border may have a country of origin other than the country where they present for inspection. Such animals include those from the U.S. that cross to Mexico and return, and animals from other countries that travel overland through Mexico or the U.S. before crossing the border.

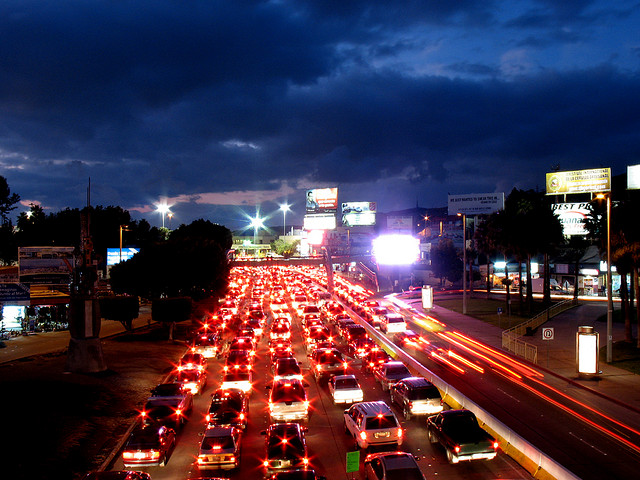
Thousands of cars sit from fifteen minutes to two hours waiting to cross the border.

APHIS imposes precautions to keep out several equine diseases, including glanders, dourine, equine infectious anemia, equine piroplasmosis, Venezuelan equine encephalitis, and contagious equine metritis. APHIS also checks horses to prevent the introduction of ticks and other parasites. In the Lower Rio Grande Valley, U.S. Department of Agriculture inspectors look for horses and livestock that stray across the border carrying ticks. These animals are often called wetstock, and the inspectors are referred to as tickriders.

Per APHIS, horses originating from Canada can enter the U.S. with a Canadian government veterinary health certificate and a negative test for EIA. Horses from Mexico must have a health certificate; pass negative tests for EIA, dourine, glanders, and EP at a USDA import center; and undergo precautionary treatments for external parasites at the port of entry. Horses from other Western Hemisphere countries must have the same tests as those from Mexico and, except for horses from Argentina, must be held in quarantine for at least seven days as a check for VEE. APHIS imposes similar testing and certification requirements on horses from other parts of the world, but without the quarantine for VEE. These horses are held in quarantine—usually three days—or until tests are completed. Because the disease equine piroplasmosis (equine babesiosis) is endemic in Mexico but not established in the U.S., transportation of horses from Mexico to the U.S. requires evaluation of horses for the presence of this disease. A leading exception to this rule is the special waiver obtained by riders participating in the Cabalgata Binacional Villista (see cavalcade). Import from the U.S. to Mexico requires evidence within the prior 45 days of freedom from EIA, among other requirements.

== US security ==
=== Background ===
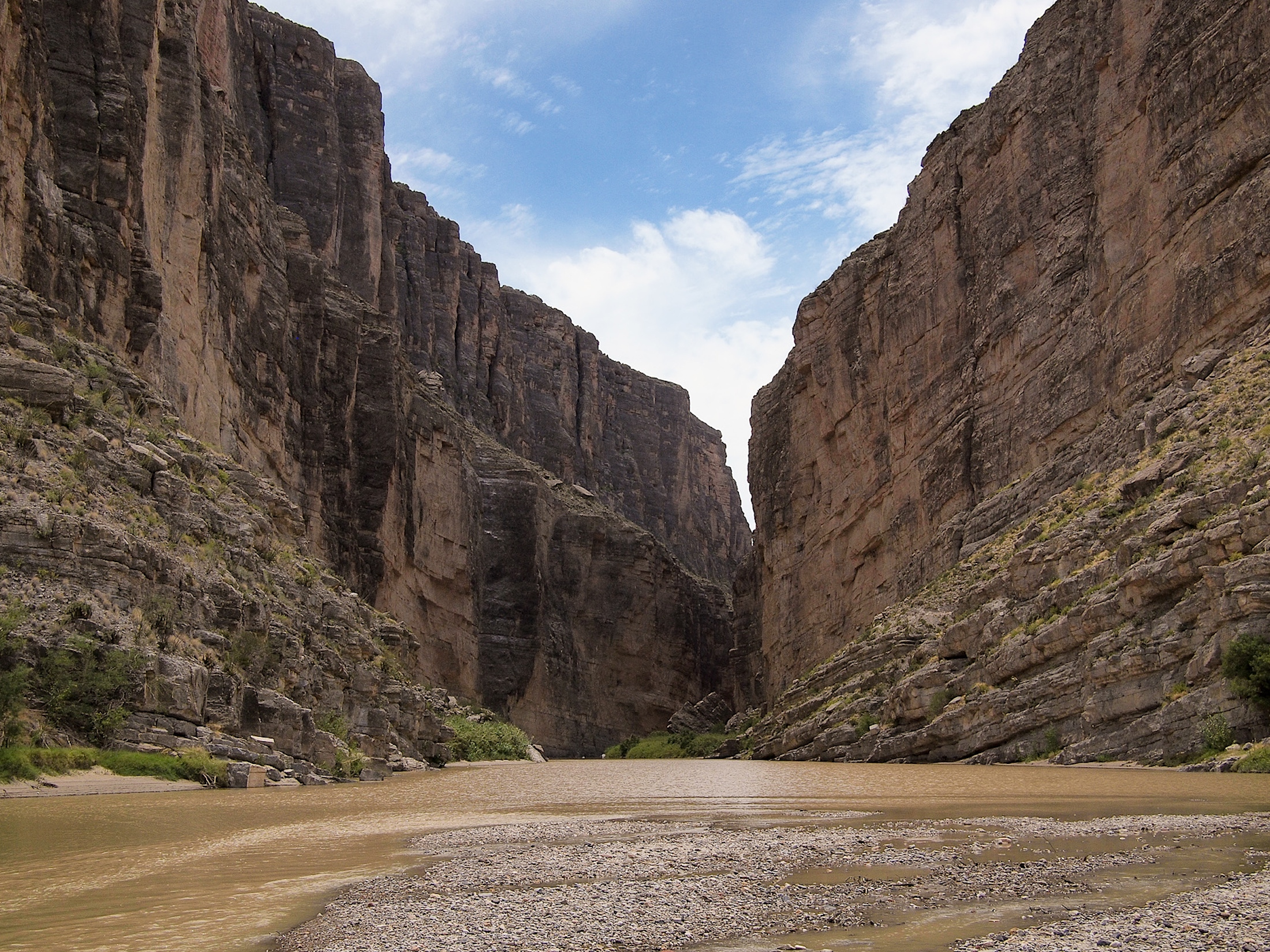
The Big Bend National Park is located at the border.

Data from the U.S. Border Patrol Agency's 2010 annual report shows that among the total number of border crossings without documentation from various countries into the U.S., 90% were from Mexico alone. In addition, there are more than 6 million undocumented Mexican nationals residing in the U.S. The border has a very high rate of documented and undocumented migrant crossings every year. With such a high rate of people crossing annually to the U.S., the country has invested in several distinct security measures.

In 2010, President Barack Obama signed an appropriation bill which gave the Customs and Border Protection, specifically the Border Patrol, 600 million dollars to implement and improve security. The U.S. government has invested many millions of dollars on border security, although this has not stopped undocumented immigration in the U.S. In June 2018, the U.S. government announced installation of facial recognition system for monitoring immigrant activities.

=== Border enforcement ===
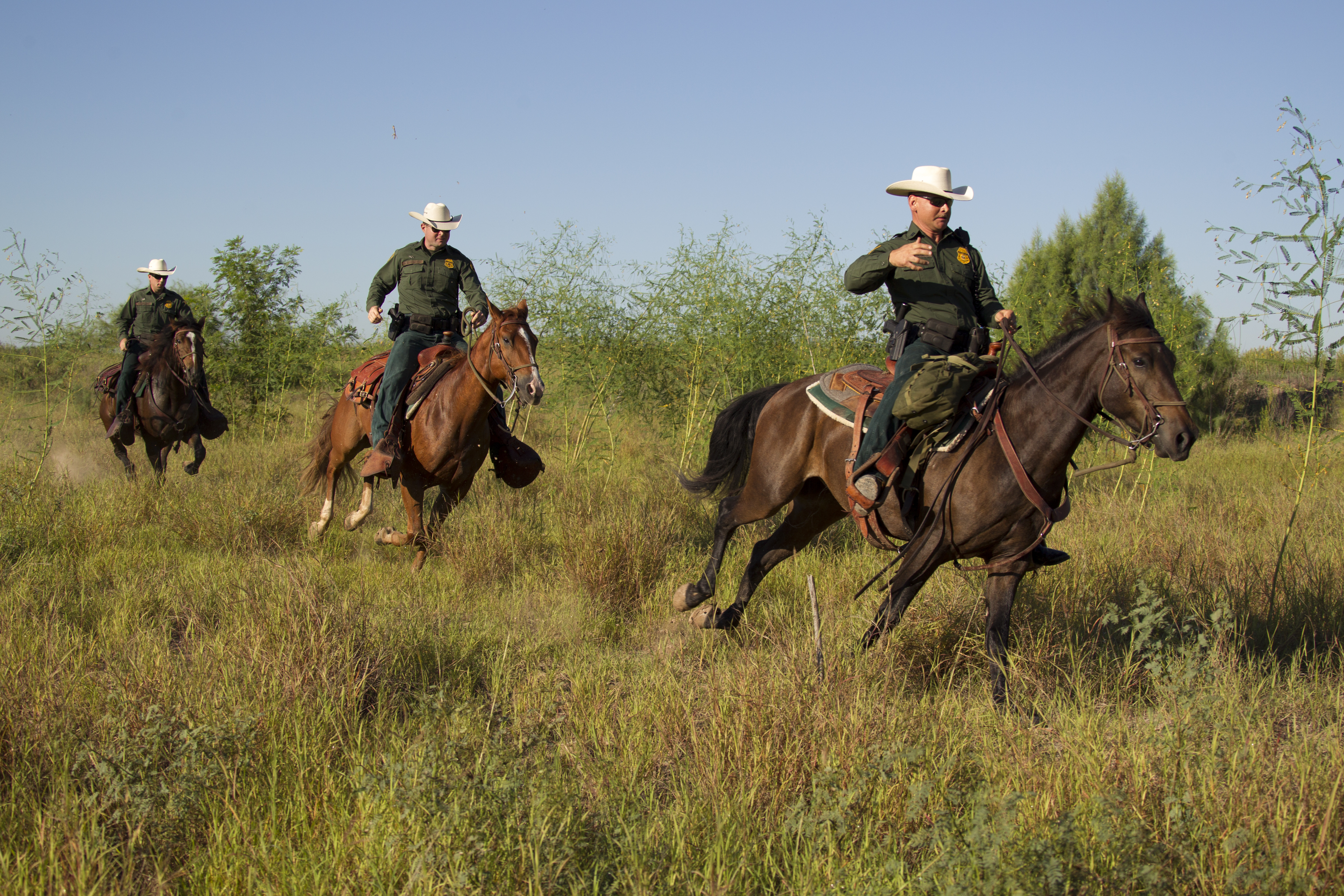
Border Patrol agents in southern Texas in 2013

The Border Patrol was created in 1924 with its primary mission to detect and prevent the illegal entry of immigrants into the U.S. Together with other law enforcement officers, the Border Patrol maintains the U.S.' borderlands—regulating the flow of legal immigration and goods while patrolling for undocumented migrants and trafficking of people and contraband. The present strategy to enforce migration along the U.S.–Mexico border is by means of "prevention through deterrence". Its primary goal is to completely prevent undocumented immigrants from entering the U.S. from Mexico rather than apprehending the unauthorized who are already in the country. As assertive as it was, "prevention through deterrence" was arguably unsuccessful, with a doubling in size of the undocumented immigrant population during the two decades leading up to 2014.

In 2012, Border Patrol agents made over 364,000 arrests of people illegally entering the country. Several regional border control operations were implemented, including Operation Gatekeeper in San Diego; Operation Hold the Line in El Paso; Operation Rio Grande in McAllen; Operation Safeguard in Tucson; and the Arizona Border Control Initiative along the Arizona Borderlands. According to Vulliamy, one in five Mexican nationals will visit or work in the U.S. at one point in their lifetime. As of 2010, the border is guarded by more than 20,000 Border Patrol agents, more than at any time in its history. The border is paralleled by U.S. Border Patrol interior checkpoints on major roads generally between 40 and 121 km (25 and 75 mi) from the U.S. side of the border, and garitas generally within 50 km (31 mi) of the border on the Mexican side.

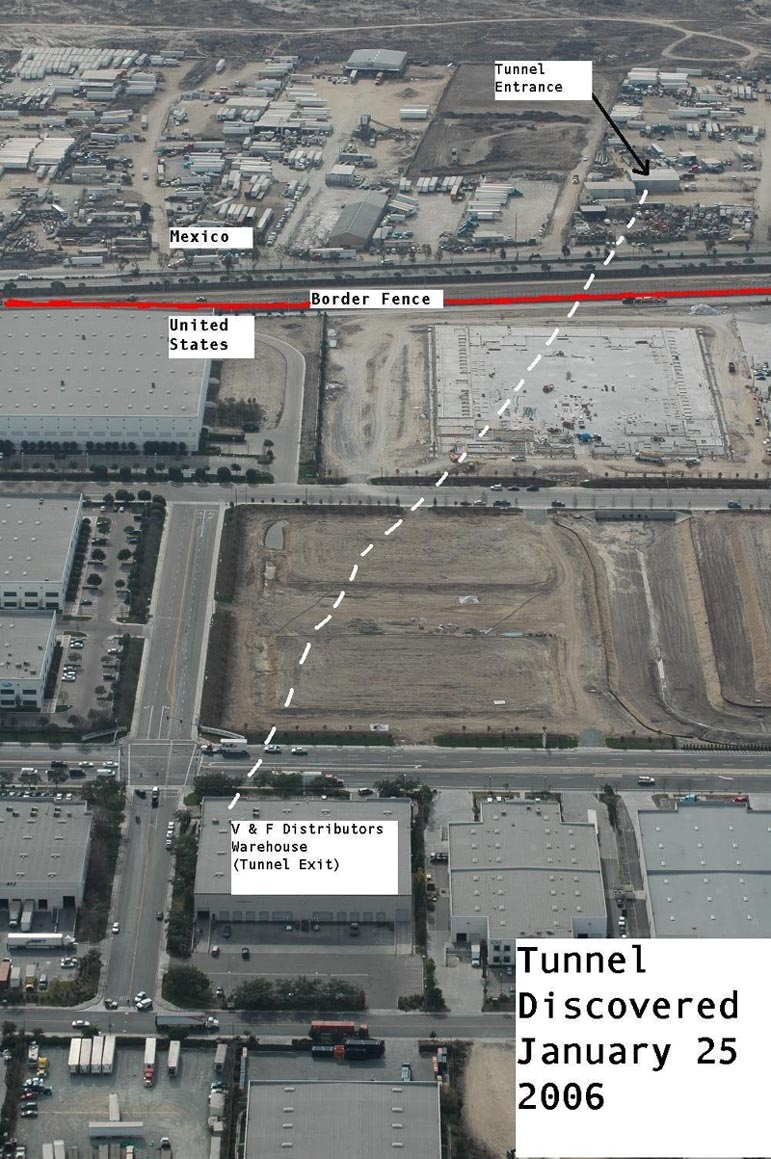
Drug trafficking tunnel under the U.S.–Mexico border used by the Sinaloa Cartel

There are an estimated half a million illegal entries into the U.S. each year. Undocumented labor contributes $395 billion to the economy every year. While the U.S. is in favor of immigration, the increase in undocumented immigration has given border-crossing a negative image. There are around 11.5 million undocumented workers in the U.S. today, and 87% of undocumented immigrants have been living in the U.S. for more than 7 years. Local economies that develop on the Mexican side capitalize not only on available skills but also on available, usually discarded, materials. Small businesses trade in clothes that are purchased by the pound and cardboard from the U.S. Some items, like the used tires found everywhere along the border, are made into certain items that support local economies and define the border.

The Secure Fence Act of 2006 was passed, providing for the construction of 1,127 km (700 mi) of high-security fencing. Attempts to complete the construction of the Mexico–United States barrier have been challenged by the Mexican government and various U.S.–based organizations. In January 2013, the Government Accountability Office released a report stating that the U.S. Border Patrol intercepted 61% of individuals illegally crossing the border in 2011, which translates to 208,813 individuals not apprehended. 85,827 of the 208,813 would go on to illegally enter the U.S., while the rest returned to Mexico and other Central American countries. The report also shows that the number of illegal border crossings has dropped.

View chart definition.

The apprehensions per (fiscal) year are shown in the graph; they reached a maximum of over 1.643 million in the year 2000. Similar numbers had been reached in 1986 with over 1.615 million. The increase in border security throughout the years has progressively made crossings at the U.S.–Mexico border more dangerous, which has developed into a human rights crisis at the border. The number of migrant deaths occurring along the U.S.–Mexico border has dramatically increased since the implementation of the funnel effect. Along the Arizona-Mexico border, only seven migrant deaths were recorded in 1996; however, the remains of over 2,000 migrants were discovered from 2001 to 2012. Since the majority of deaths occur in rural areas, where extreme temperatures are common, the number of recorded deaths is likely far below the total. Because of the harsh, inaccessible terrain, human remains may not be found for years or ever. The Human Rights Watch cited on April 22, 2020, that a U.S.–Mexico border shutdown could be expected following the COVID-19 public health emergency. According to HRW, the new rule introduced by the CDC overlooks the fact that the U.S. is obligated to protect refugees from return to conditions threatening prosecution, as per treaties.

In May 2023, the United States officially ended the use of Title 42, a public health measure enacted during the COVID-19 pandemic to rapidly expel migrants at the border. With the expiration of Title 42, authorities resumed removals under Title 8, which includes formal deportation proceedings and multi-year reentry bans for repeat offenders. In February 2025, migrant arrests at the Mexico–United States border were projected to reach a record low, with U.S. Border Patrol expecting around 8,500 apprehensions, according to the Department of Homeland Security. This decline followed President Donald Trump’s return to office on January 20 2025, when he implemented strict immigration policies, including an asylum ban and increased military presence at the border. The American Civil Liberties Union challenged the ban in court. The previous record low was in April 2017, early in Trump's first term. Arrests had previously dipped at the start of his 2017–2021 presidency before rising again in later years.

=== Barrier ===
The U.S. government had plans in 2006, during the Bush administration, to erect a concrete border fence along the Mexico–U.S. border. The controversial proposal included creating many individual fences. Almost 966 km (600 mi) of the fence was constructed, with each of the individual fences composed of steel and concrete. In between these fences are infrared cameras and sensors, National Guard soldiers, and SWAT teams on high alert, giving rise to the term "virtual fence". Construction on the fence began in 2006, with each mile costing the U.S. government about $2.8 million. In 2010, the initiative was terminated because of costs, after having completed 1,030 km (640 mi) of either barrier fence or vehicle barriers, that were either new or had been rebuilt over older, inferior fencing. The Boeing-built SBI-net systems of using radar, watchtowers, and sensors (without a fence or physical barrier) were scrapped for being over budget, full of glitches, and far behind schedule.

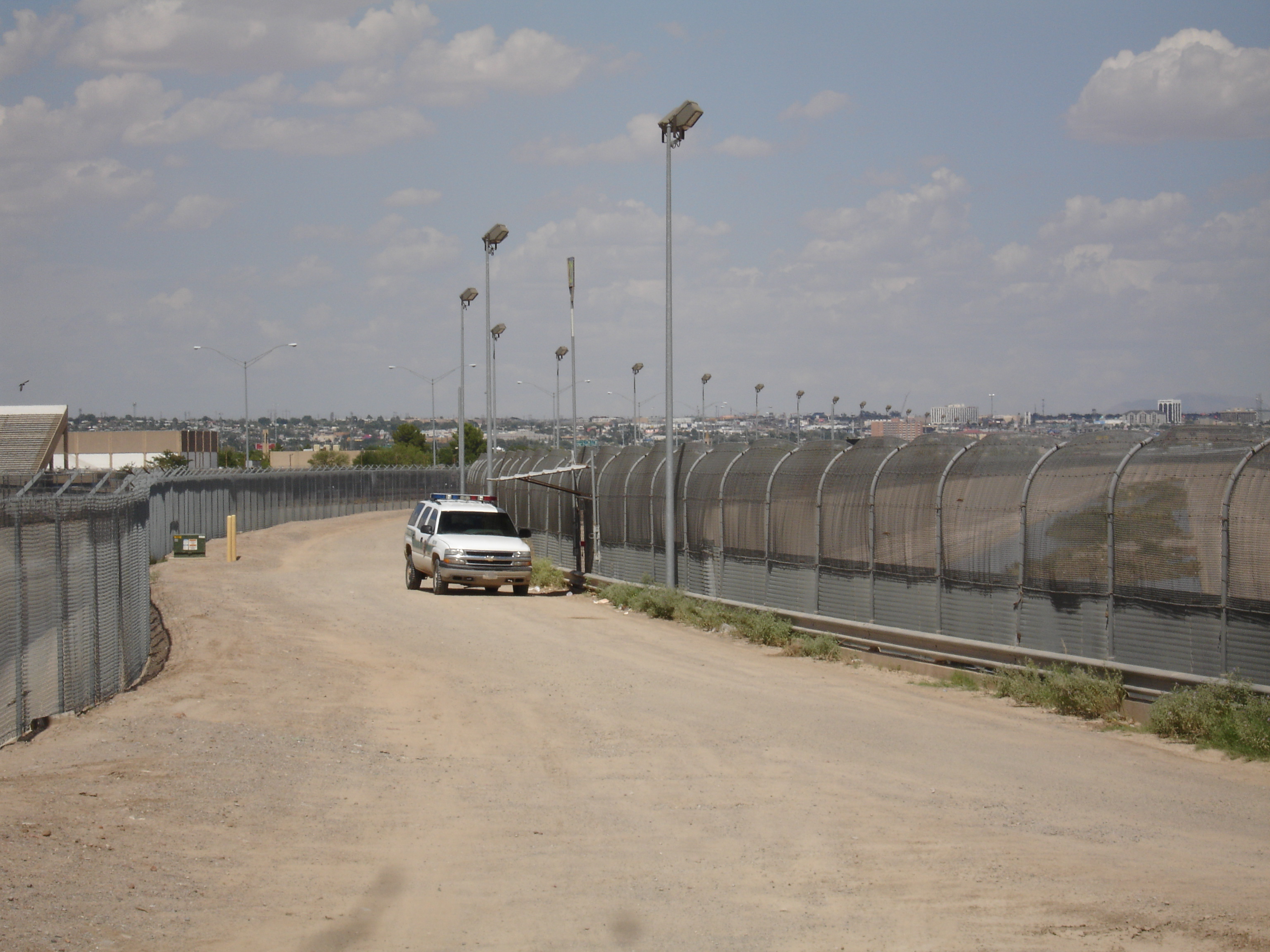
The U.S.–Mexico border fence near El Paso, Texas

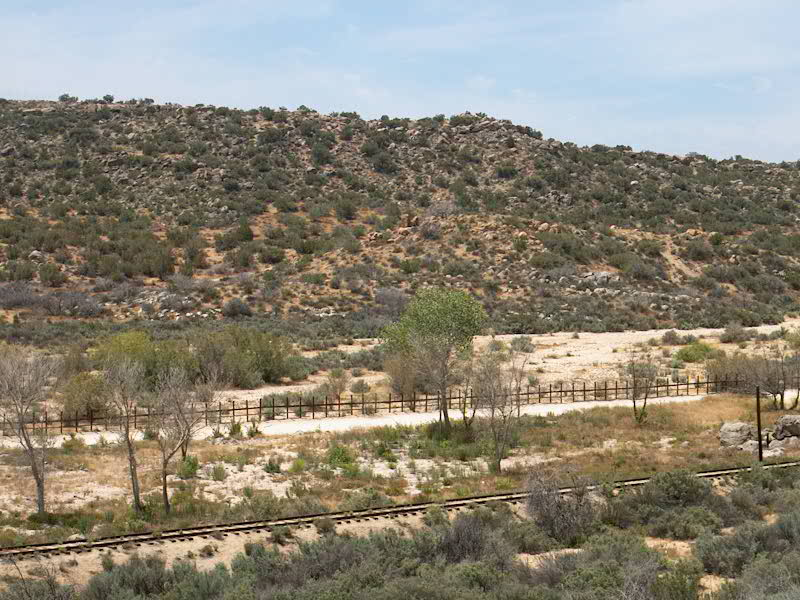
Portion of border near Jacumba, California, in 2003

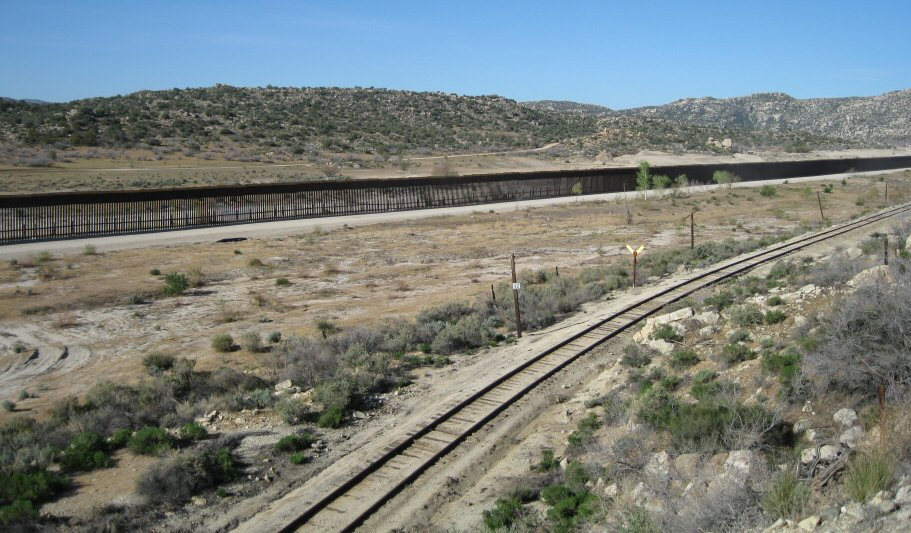
Portion of border near Jacumba, California, in 2009 with enhanced security

=== Border incursions ===
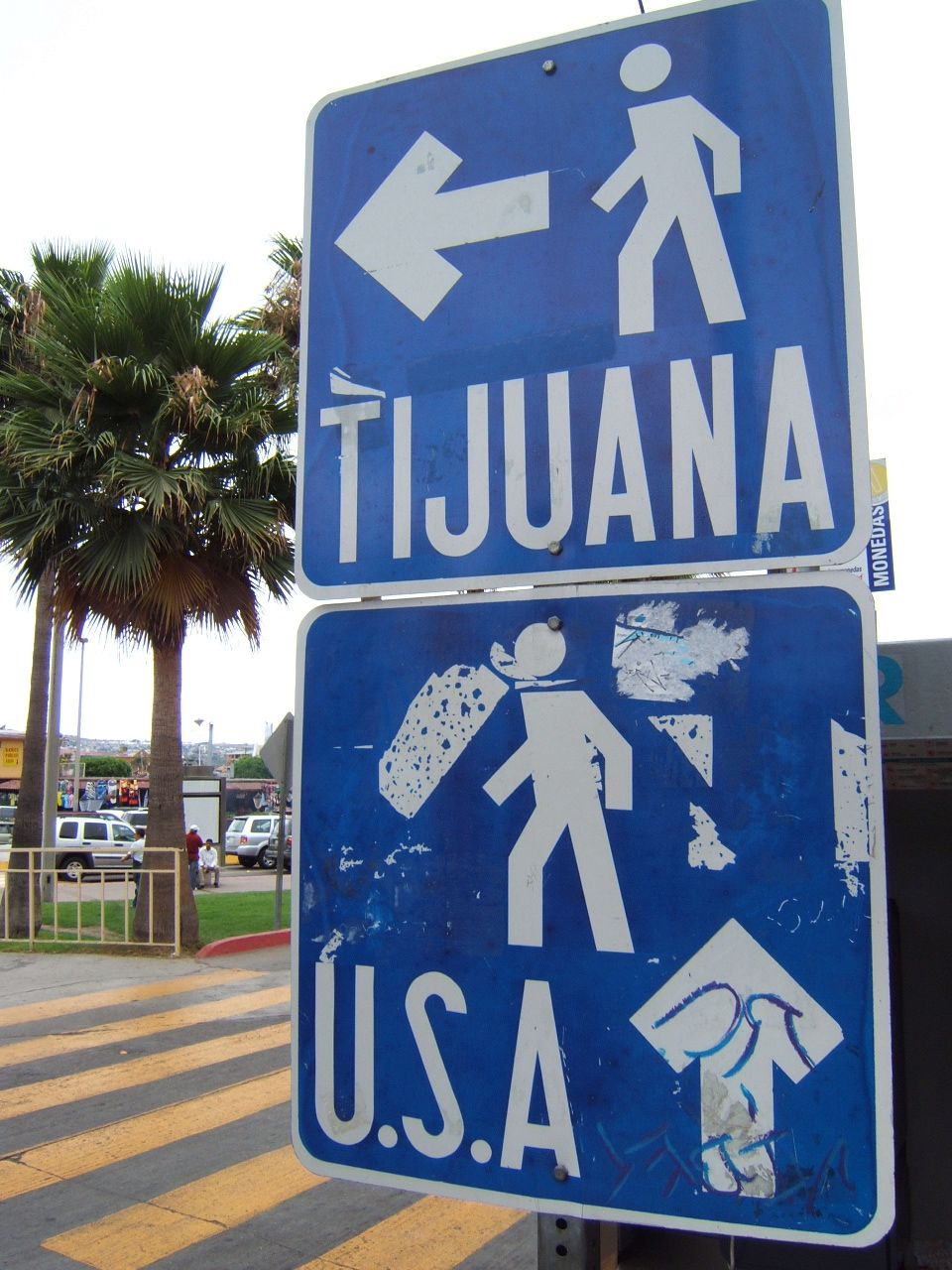
Border for pedestrians in Tijuana, Baja California

In the fiscal year of 2006, there were 29 confirmed border incursions by Mexican government officials, of which 17 were by armed individuals. Since 1996, there have been 253 incursions by Mexican government officials. In 2014 the U.S. Department of Homeland Security informed California Representative Duncan D. Hunter that since 2004, there have been 300 documented border incursions, which resulted in 131 individuals being detained.

According to the U.S. Border Patrol, apprehensions of Central Americans at the border reduced from 70,000 to 55,000 attempted illegal migrants from 2007 to 2011. On August 3, 2008, Mexican military personnel crossed from Mexico into the United States and encountered a Border Patrol agent, whom they held at gunpoint. The soldiers later returned to Mexico, as backup Border Patrol agents came to investigate. Thereafter, the number of apprehensions increased dramatically to 95,000 in 2012, 150,000 in 2013, and 220,000 in 2014. The increased apprehensions could have been the result of improved border security or a dramatic rise in attempted crossings, or both.

=== Disagreements over the need for more resources ===
Proponents of greater spending on the border argue that continuing the buildup is necessary because of increased violence and drug trafficking from Mexico spilling into the U.S. However, critics such as the Washington Office on Latin America have argued that the diminishing number of border crossings can only be partially attributed to U.S. security measures. Unintentional factors, such as a weakened U.S. economy in the wake of the 2008 financial crisis and the Mexican drug war have made attempting illegal border crossings more risky and less rewarding.

=== Trump administration ===
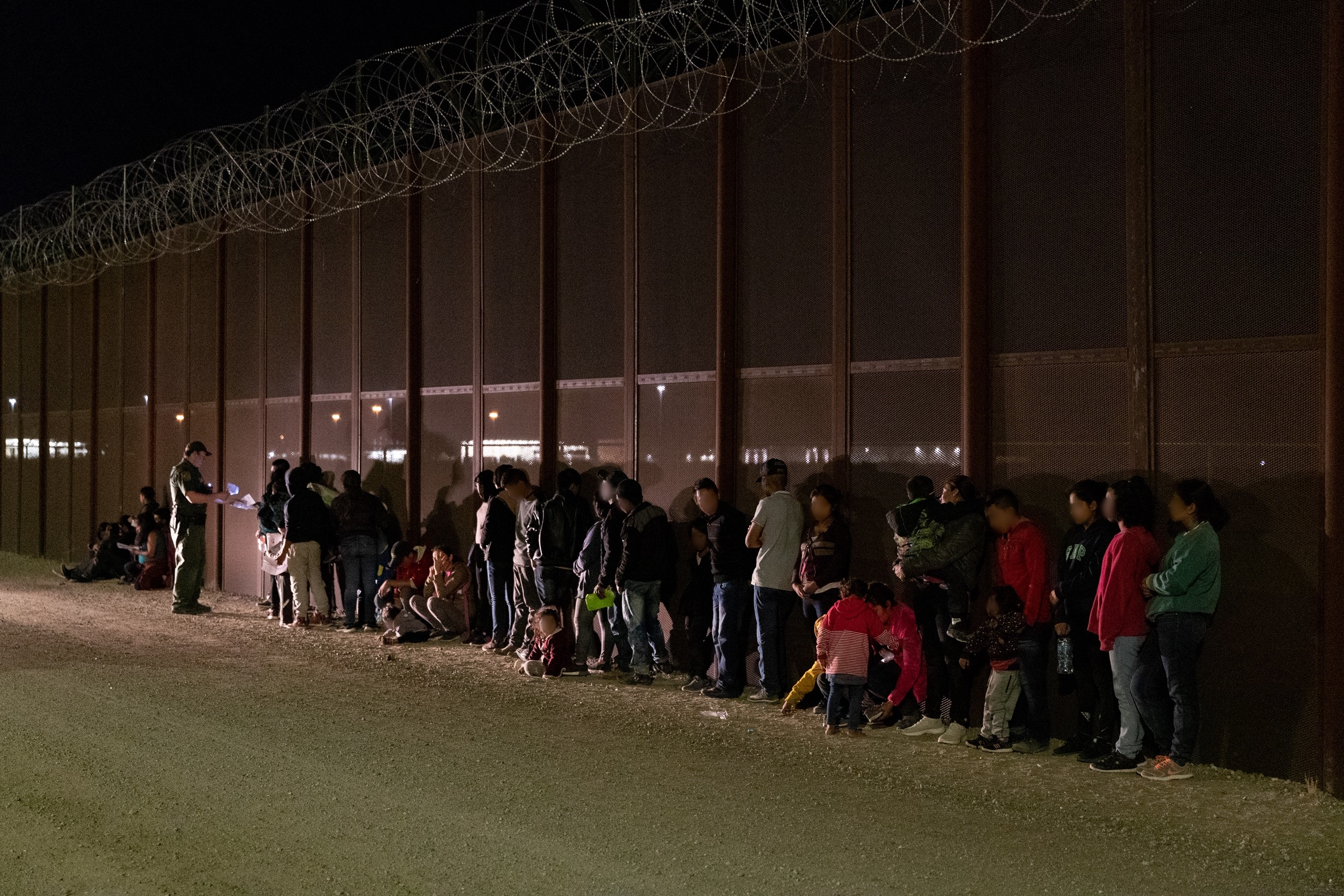
U.S. Border Patrol agents review documents of individuals suspected of attempted illegal entry in 2019.

In 2016, the Republican nominee for president Donald Trump proposed building a border wall to control immigration. He falsely declared that, as president, he would force Mexico to "pay for it." On January 25, 2017, several days after his inauguration and two days in advance of a planned meeting in Washington, D.C., with Mexican President Enrique Peña Nieto, new U.S. president Trump signed Executive Order 13767 to enable the building of the wall. Peña Nieto denied that Mexico would pay for the wall and declined the meeting. Shortly after, Trump announced that he intended to impose a 20% tariff on Mexican goods. Mexico did not make any payments.

On September 20, 2017, California Attorney General Xavier Becerra filed a lawsuit alleging that the Trump administration has overstepped its powers in expediting construction of a border wall. As of the end of 2017, Mexico had not agreed to pay any amount toward the wall, no new tariffs on Mexican goods had been considered by the U.S. Congress, the U.S. Congress had not appropriated funding for a wall, and no further wall construction had started beyond what was already planned during the Obama administration.

In June 2018, the Trump administration established a new policy of separating parents from their children at the Mexican border. People asking for asylum at official ports of entry were "being turned away and told there's no room for them now." The U.S. and Mexico mutually placed tariffs on each other's exports.

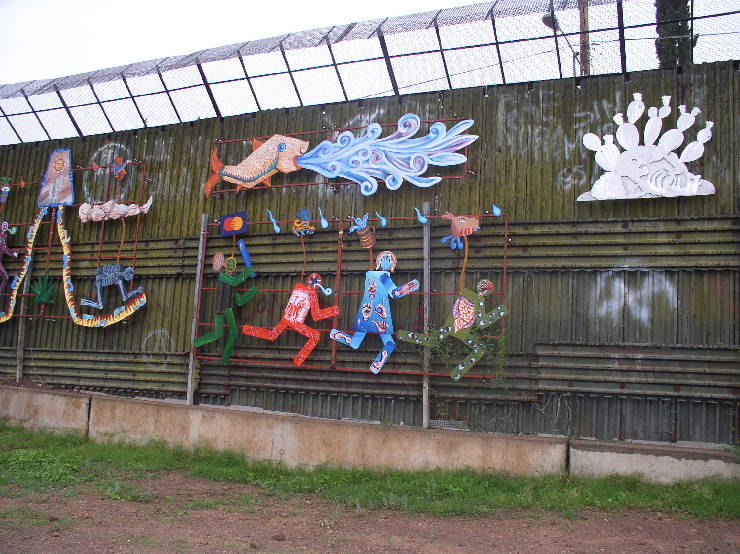
Nogales border fence

On November 8, 2018, the Trump administration announced new rules to deny asylum to anyone who crosses into the U.S. illegally from any nation, at Trump's discretion. This was based on the Supreme Court decision of Trump v. Hawaii and the presidential powers of the Immigration and Nationality Act of 1965. Trump signed a proclamation the next day to specify that people crossing the Mexican border illegally would not qualify for asylum; he called the march of migrants from Central America towards the U.S. a "crisis". Civil rights groups strongly criticized the move, and several groups, including the Southern Poverty Law Center, the American Civil Liberties Union, and the Center for Constitutional Rights, filed a lawsuit in the U.S. District Court for the Northern District of California to challenge the proclamation. Judge Jon S. Tigar ruled in favor of the advocacy groups on November 20, 2018, placing an injunction on the administration to delay implementation of the rule. The administration appealed to the Ninth Circuit, where a divided 2–1 panel ruled that the new asylum rules were inconsistent with existing law and upheld the injunction. On December 21, 2018, the Supreme Court declined to hear the administration's challenge, leaving the injunction in place and preventing the asylum ban from being enforced.

During the 2018 fiscal year, U.S. border agents arrested 107,212 people traveling in families, a record-high number. During the following five months (October 2018 through February 2019), that record was shattered by the arrest of 136,150 people traveling in families. On March 31, 2019, Trump threatened to close the border, cutting off trade between the countries. On April 4, Trump said that instead he would give Mexico a year to stop illegal drugs from coming into the U.S. If this did not happen, he said tariffs on automobiles would be used first, and then closing of the border.

During Donald Trump's 2024 presidential campaign and subsequent return to office in 2025, immigration policy at the U.S.–Mexico border has remained a central focus of his administration. Building on earlier initiatives, the administration has implemented a series of enforcement measures aimed at reducing unauthorized border crossings, enhancing border security infrastructure, and increasing deportations of undocumented individuals. These actions included executive orders to shut down legal entry appointment systems, suspend refugee admissions, deploy the military to the border, and reinstate policies such as "Remain in Mexico."

==== Proposed funding for building a wall ====
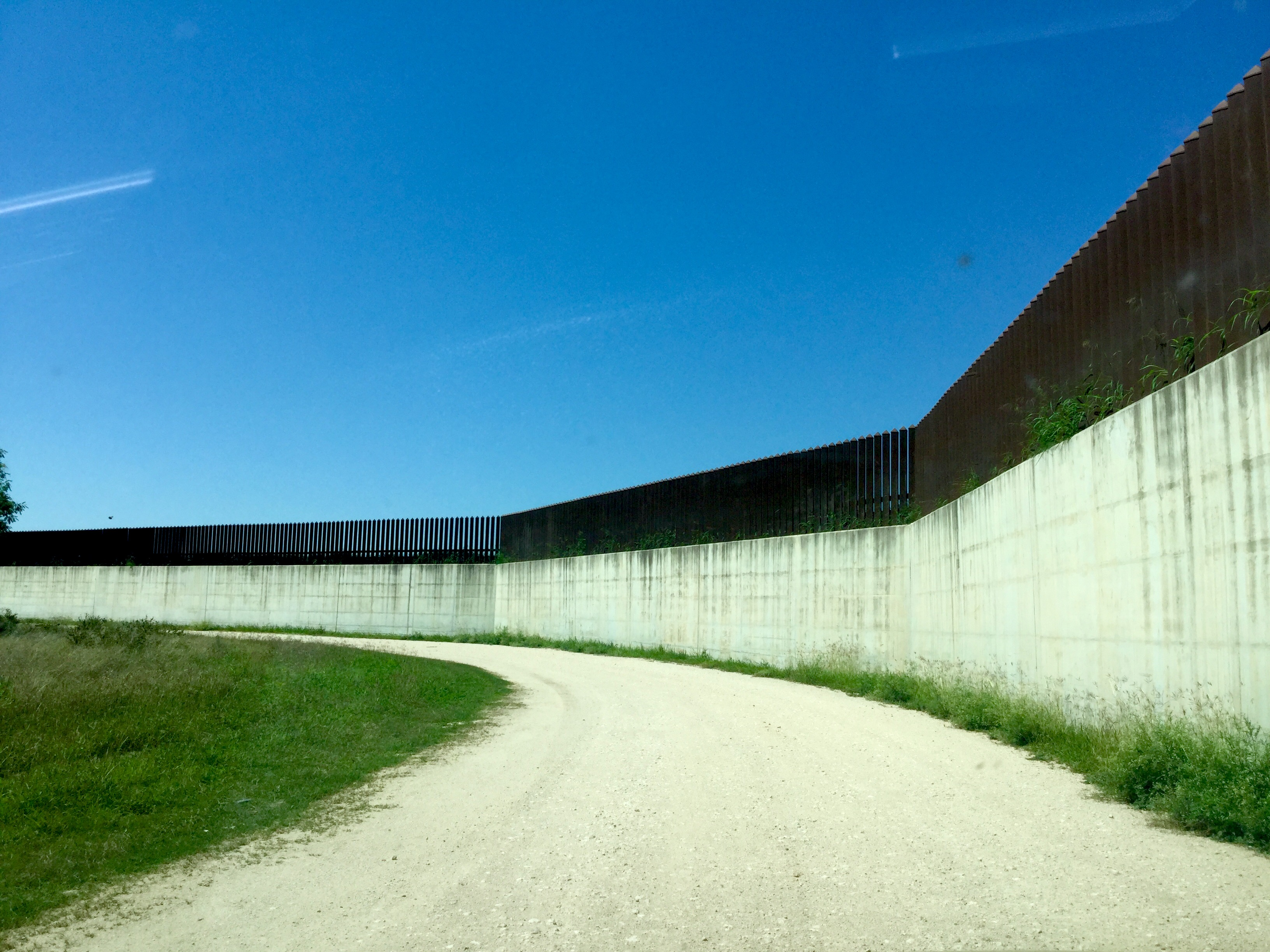
U.S.–Mexico border wall, Progreso Lakes, Texas

While running for president, Trump estimated that a border wall would cost $8 to $12 billion and falsely said he could force Mexico to pay for it. Cost estimates of the proposed wall vary widely. In early 2017, shortly after Trump took office, the DHS estimated the cost at $22 billion, while Democratic staff on the Senate Homeland Security and Governmental Affairs Committee estimated $70 billion to build the wall and $150 million in annual maintenance.

In the summer of 2017, four major construction companies planned to bid for the contract. The Customs and Border Protection agency budgeted $20 million to hire these companies to build half-million-dollar prototypes of the wall. At this time, Congress had only approved $341 million to maintain the existing wall; no funds had been allocated to build new sections of wall. The DHS recommended that the wall's height should be between 5.5 and 9.1 m (18 and 30 ft) and its depth should be up to 1.8 m (6 ft) to deter drug traffickers from building tunnels. During the Trump administration, 732 km (455 mi) were added to the barrier between the two countries. The construction of the wall has been halted by President Joe Biden as he canceled the national emergency declaration, originally used by Trump.

=== Biden administration ===
The U.S. Border Patrol detained more than 1.7 million migrants crossing the U.S.-Mexico border illegally in fiscal year 2021, the highest number ever recorded. A greater demographic diversity of southwest border apprehensions was noted in 2021. On October 31, 2023, Homeland Security Secretary Alejandro Mayorkas testified before the Senate Homeland Security Committee that more than 600,000 people illegally made their way into the United States without being apprehended by border agents during the 2023 fiscal year.

On January 17, 2024, a Republican-led non-binding resolution denouncing the Biden-Harris administration's handling of the U.S. southern border passed the House of Representatives by a vote of 225–187, with 211 Republicans and 14 Democrats supporting it.

On February 8, 2024, a group of 24 House Republicans wrote a letter to urge President Biden not to federalize the Texas National Guard in the midst of Texas wanting to crack down on the spike of illegal immigration on the U.S.-Mexico border.

On February 13, 2024, Secretary of Homeland Security Mayorkas was impeached on a 214–213 party-line vote by the United States House of Representatives over his handling of the Mexico–United States border.

On July 25, 2024, the United States House of Representatives voted 220–196 to pass another Republican-led resolution condemning the Biden-Harris administration for its handling of the U.S. southern border. Six Democrats, all in electorally competitive districts, voted with all Republicans in the House to pass the resolution. Democratic Caucus Chair Pete Aguilar said Republicans were playing politics and that the resolution "isn't moving the needle with voters," so members vote how they need to vote.

=== Migrant deaths and humanitarian concerns ===
Border Patrol has reported more than 10,000 migrant deaths along the border between 1994 and 2024, but human rights groups believe that the total number of migrant deaths could be as high as 80,000. Border Patrol activity is concentrated around border cities such as San Diego and El Paso, which have extensive border fencing. This means that the flow of illegal immigrants is diverted into rural mountainous and desert areas, leading to several hundred migrant deaths along the Mexico–U.S. border of those attempting to cross into the U.S. from Mexico illegally and vice versa.

To effectively enforce border protection, the policies and regulations of the U.S. have sought to make border crossings more hazardous, creating a "funnel effect." The tactic was meant to discourage migration from Mexico into the U.S. by forcing migrants to travel further around barriers where the terrain and weather are more risky, but the strategy was not as successful as initially planned. As a result, the effect funneled more immigrants to their death even with the assistance of coyotes (smugglers). Not only has this approach caused fatalities throughout the U.S.–Mexico border, but it has even stirred up a nuisance for documented immigrants and American citizens. There has been general concern about the Border Patrol and other agencies abusing their authority by racial profiling and conducting unwarranted searches outside the exception of the 40 km (25 mi) border zone, but still within the 161 km (100 mi) border zone. In June 2019, the bodies of Óscar Alberto Martínez and his 23-month-old daughter, Angie Valeria, were found dead in the Rio Grande River. The family was from El Salvador, attempting to cross from Mexico into the U.S. near Brownsville, Texas.

In 2022, the U.S.–Mexico border was recorded as the world's deadliest land migration route. The International Organization for Migration (IOM) documented 686 deaths and disappearances that year, attributed to heat exposure, drowning, and dangerous terrain. Distribution of natural resources across the border has also been a major challenge, particularly for water use and water quality. Toxic sewage flowing into Mexico and over-consumption of water from the Colorado River Basin and the middle-lower Rio Grande have been central to the conflict. Large-scale infrastructure investments may be necessary to address the growing water and energy issues in this arid region.

=== Humanitarian assistance along the border ===
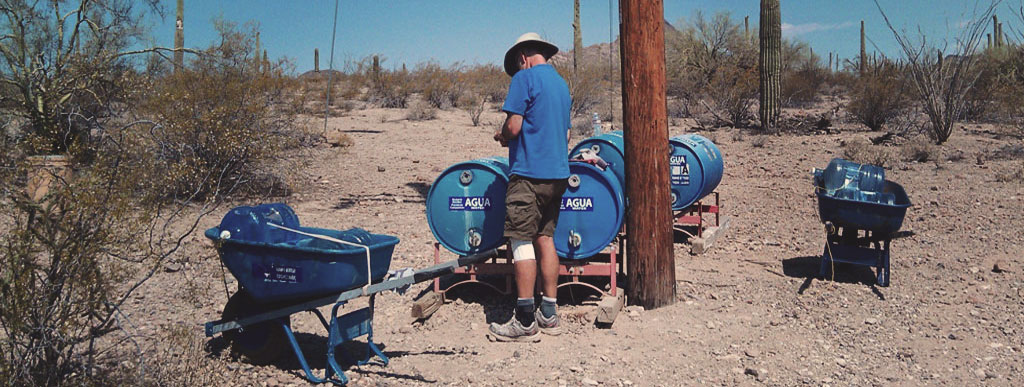
A volunteer from the Humane Border group is refilling water stations located on the desert of the U.S.-Mexico border.

Humanitarian groups such as Humane Borders, No More Deaths, and Samaritans provide water to reduce deaths of immigrants who are journeying through the Arizona desert. A policy passed in 2010 by the U.S. Fish and Wildlife federal agency allows water drums to be placed on roads of disturbed areas.

No More Deaths (No Más Muertes) is a non-governmental organization (NGO) headquartered in Tucson that is designed to assist in ending the death and suffering of immigrants along the U.S.-Mexico border by upholding fundamental human rights. Elemental services of No More Deaths are to provide humanitarian assistance, give food and first aid treatment, witness and respond to human rights abuses, encourage humane immigration policy, and make phone calls to relatives of immigrants. Since its founding in 2004, No More Deaths has assisted thousands of migrant border crossers; however the Border Patrol and other public land agencies near the U.S.–Mexico border have challenged the efforts of various humanitarian groups, by following immigrants to a medical volunteer camp and raiding it. Humanitarian groups along the border have been tested by Border Patrol and other agencies, however the authority of the Trump administration has introduced a new tier of restriction through surveillance, harassment, and intimidation to border relief efforts.

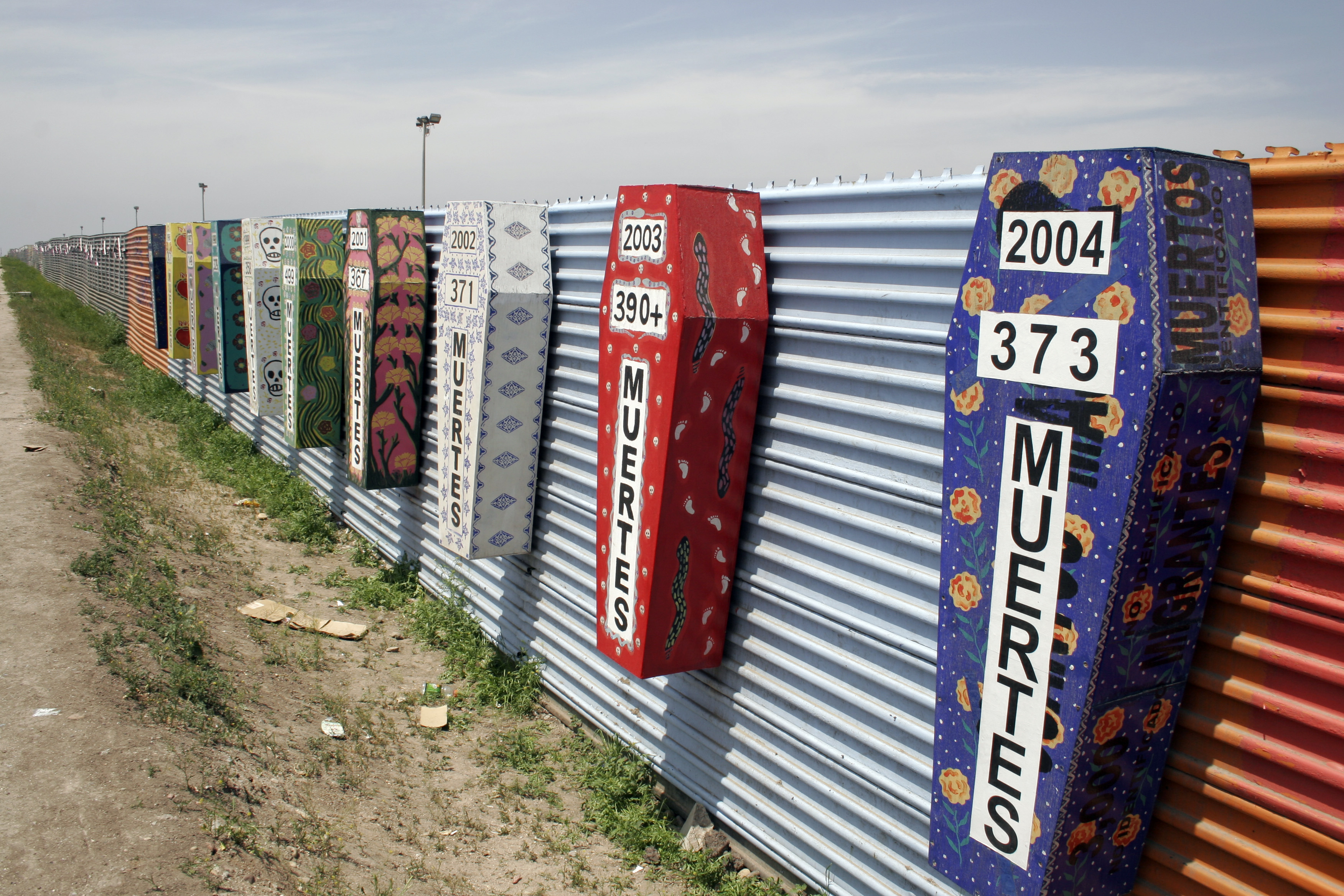
Memorial coffins on the US-Mexico barrier in Tijuana for those killed crossing the border fence

Incidence rates of HIV and tuberculosis are higher in border towns such as El Paso and Ciudad Juárez than at the national level in both countries. The Nuestra Casa Initiative tried to counter the health disparities by using a cross-border strategy that moved around an exhibit prominent in various museums and universities. Similarly, special action groups as part of the Border Health Strategic Initiative created by the University of Arizona with other groups helped create a healthier Hispanic community in Arizona border towns by creating policy and infrastructure changes. These groups provided humanitarian assistance to counter the prominence of Type 2 diabetes among the Hispanic community by acquiring a grant for new walking trails and encouraging public elementary schools to provide healthier food choices for students.

Immigrants are considered easy targets by gang members because they do not have the strength to resist aggressive offenders and end up with nothing. In June 2018, U.S. Attorney General Jeff Sessions disqualified victims of gangs or domestic violence to be reasonable causes for asylum seekers.

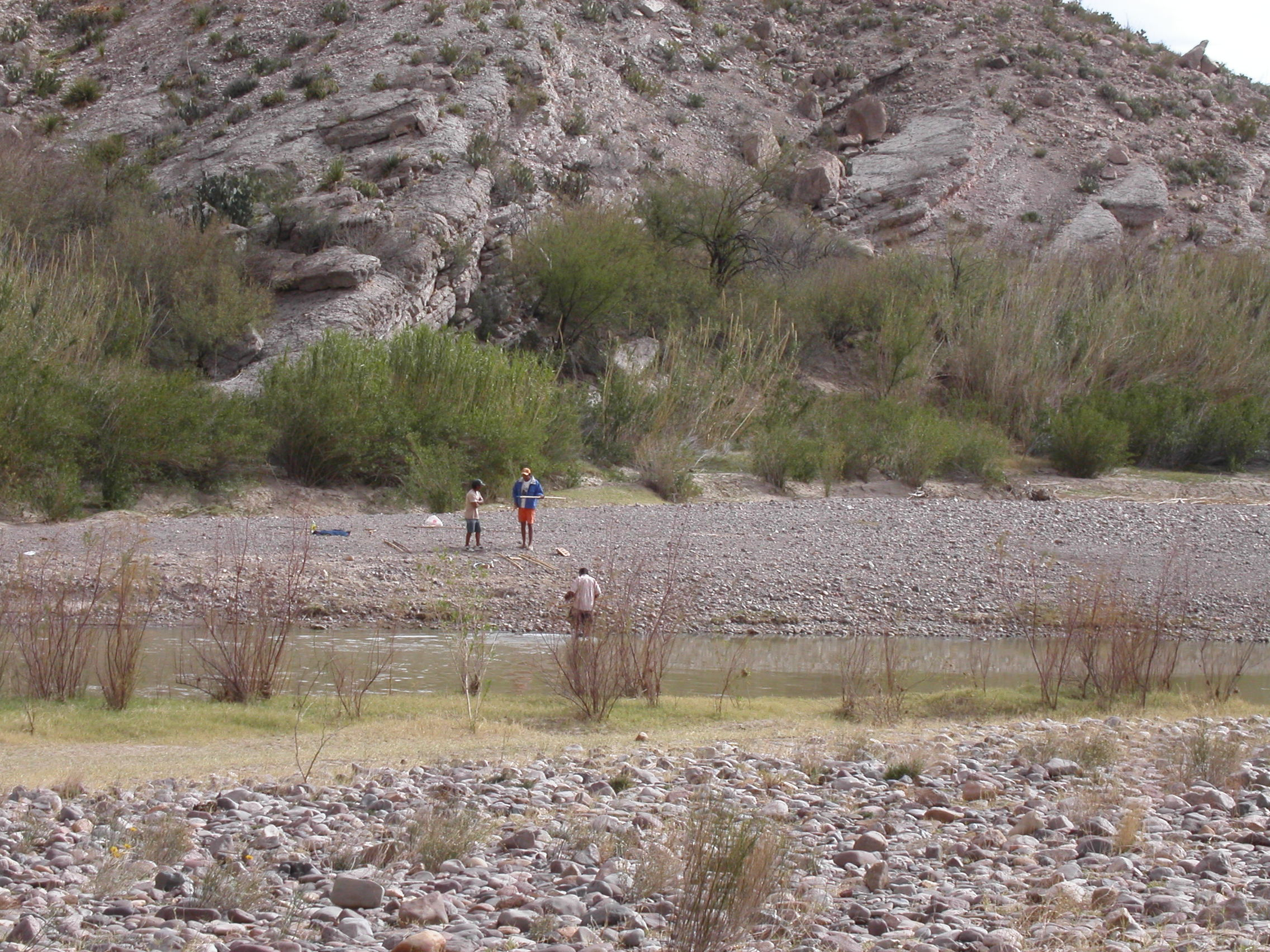
Mexicans crossing the Río Grande face the Big Bend National Park

Not only do these Hispanic communities face health inequalities, but political inequalities as well. The need for political change was so huge that it has encouraged Hispanic women to engage in activism at a local level. The Neighborhood Action Group in Chula Vista, California, is one of the groups that attracted the help of local Hispanic women to implement a feminist perspective in activism in spite of the social and economic obstacles as well as Assembly Bill No. 775, 2005 that prohibited children being used as interpreters. These humanitarian groups have implemented various strategies to pursue their goals that ultimately try to counter the number of immigrant deaths and abuses in immigrant detention even if it means the criminalization and higher levels of discrimination against them.

In Mexico, most humanitarian groups focus on assisting the deportees. As rates of deportation increase, "the deportation of many individuals is becoming more and more notable" in the streets of Mexican cities. As a result, many humanitarian groups have formed in Mexican cities where undocumented individuals are deported, such as Nogales, Sonora. The humanitarian groups consist of faith-based communities and primarily non-profit organizations that assist deportees, many of whom do not have any resources with them, such as money, food, or family information, and who would otherwise become homeless and emotionally and psychologically devastated. Contributing factors that might have caused them to be devastated can either be that they were separated from "their family members or the inability to work legally in the United States". Therefore, the primary purpose of the humanitarian groups on the Mexico side of the border is to create a pathway for transitional support such as providing the deportees food, shelter, clothing, legal help and social services. In addition, there are humanitarian groups that provide meals and shelter to deportees according to their deportation documents. Humanitarian groups along the border in Mexico are El Comedor, Nazareth House, Camino Juntos, La 72, and FM4: Paso Libre.

In June 2019, 300 migrant children were moved from a detention facility in Clint, Texas, after a group of lawyers who visited reported unsafe and unsanitary conditions. Democratic members of the House of Representatives introduced legislation that would aid the humanitarian crisis by giving $4.5 billion to emergency spending to address the humanitarian crisis at the border, with significant funding for priorities including legal assistance, food, water, and medical services, support services for unaccompanied children, alternatives to detention, and refugee services.

== US border zone policies ==
Per the La Paz Agreement, the official "border area" extends 100 km (62 mi) "on either side of the inland and maritime boundaries" from the Gulf of Mexico west into the Pacific Ocean.

=== 100-mile border zone ===
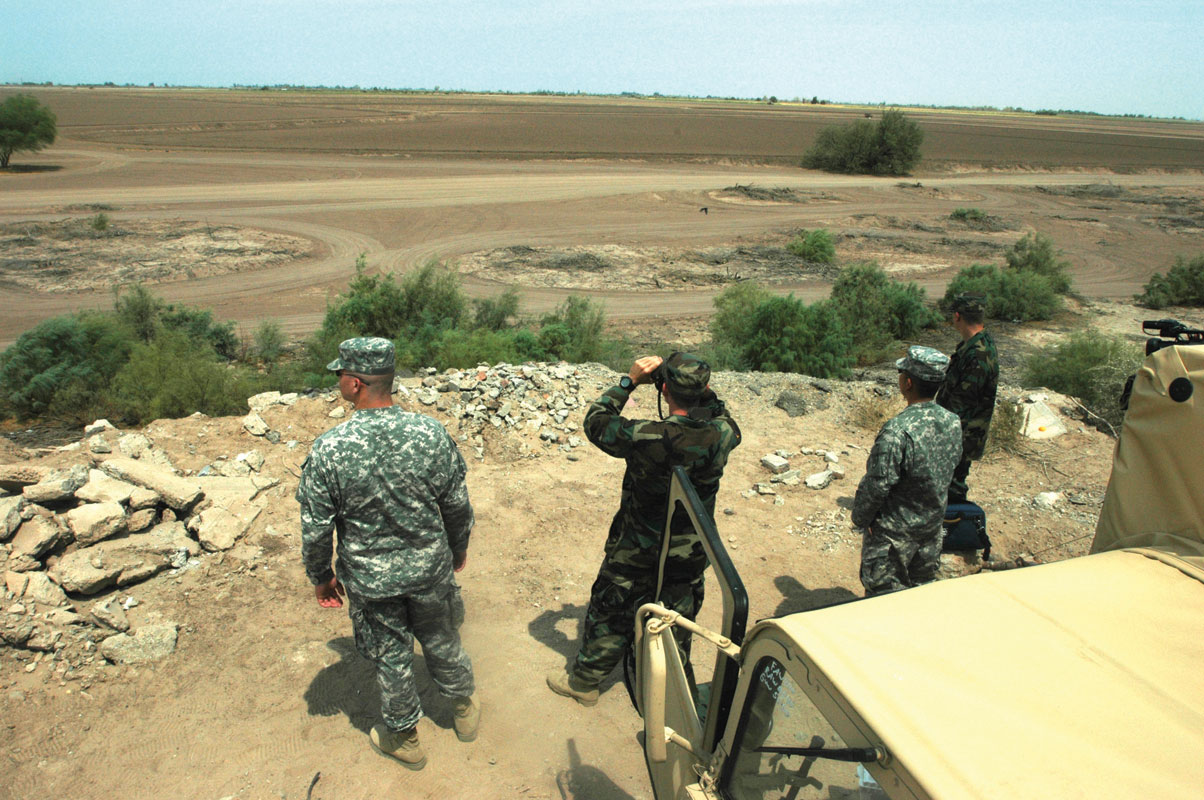
Members of the North Carolina Army National Guard monitoring the U.S.–Mexico border in southwest Arizona

The U.S. has established a 161 km (100 mi) border zone which applies to all U.S. external borders including all coasts, in effect covering two-thirds of the U.S. population, including a majority of the largest cities in the U.S. and several entire states (namely Connecticut, Delaware, Florida, Hawaii, Maine, Michigan, New Hampshire, New Jersey, and Rhode Island). The border zone was established by the U.S. DOJ in its interpretation of the Immigration and Nationality Act of 1952. Customs and Border Protection (CBP) officials have authority to stop and search within this zone and are authorized to enter private property without a warrant within 40 km (25 mi) of the border as well as establish checkpoints.

The Fourth Amendment of the U.S. Constitution protects against unreasonable search and seizure. However, under the border search exception, this protection does not fully apply at borders or border crossings (also known as ports of entry) or in the border zone. This means that much of the U.S. population is subject to CBP regulations, including stop and search. There are some limits to CBP officials' ability to stop and search. For instance, CBP officials are not allowed to pull anyone over without a reasonable suspicion of immigration violation or crime, or search vehicles without a warrant or probable cause. The ACLU, however, found that CBP officials routinely ignore or misunderstand the limits of authority, and this is compounded by inadequate training, lack of oversight, and failure to hold officials accountable for abuse. The incidence of abuse is common.

=== Secure Border Initiative ===
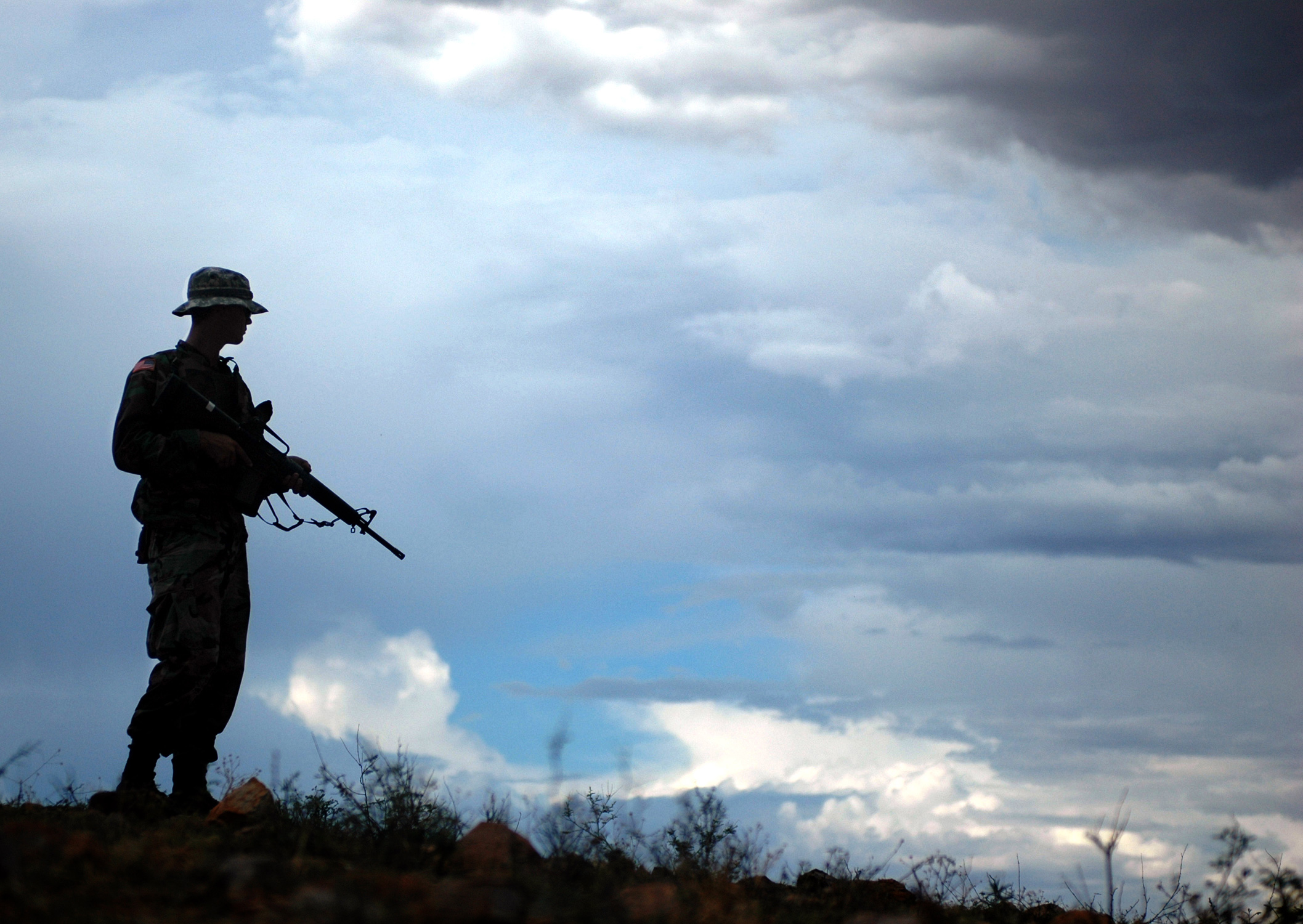
A U.S. Army National Guard member working with the U.S. Border Patrol in support of Operation Jump Start, Arizona, July 2006

A National Border Patrol Strategic Plan was first developed in 1994; it was then updated in 2004 and 2012. In 2004, the updated strategy focused on command structures, intelligence and surveillance, enforcement, and deployment of U.S. Border Patrol agents to better respond to threats at the border. The strategic planning led to broader policy development for the DHS, which led to the Secure Border Initiative (SBI) in 2005 to secure U.S. borders and reduce illegal migration. The main components of SBI dealt with staffing concerns, removal capacity, surveillance and tactical infrastructure, and interior enforcement. This initiative aims to overcome the limitations of physical barriers through the use of surveillance technologies known as "SBInet." The SBInet technology has not worked as well as potentially intended, facing several technical issues that have limited its effectiveness. Part of the initiative also focused on increasing detention and removal capacity, to add 2,000 beds to detention facilities. With the expansion of detention and removal capabilities, this was also the objective to end the "catch and release" process that had been occurring previously. An additional component was "high consequence enforcement", which was not the subject of a formal public policy document. There was the allowance, historically, for voluntary returns of individuals apprehended at the border by Border Patrol agents. These voluntary returns, after the SBI of 2005, were limited to three "high consequence outcomes".

One "high consequence outcome" was formal removal, which meant the individual would be deemed ineligible for a visa for at least five years and subject to criminal charges if caught re-entering illegally. The Immigration and Nationality Act permitted aliens to be formally removed with "limited judicial processing" known as expedited removal. The DHS has expanded between 2002 and 2006, expedited removal for "certain aliens that entered within the previous two weeks and were apprehended within 161 km (100 mi) of the border". Another "high consequence outcome" is the increase in criminal charges. The DHS has also worked with the U.S. Department of Justice (DOJ) to increase the number of apprehended individuals crossing the border illegally who are charged with criminal offenses. Most of these cases are prosecuted under Operation Streamline. The third "high consequence outcome" is known as remote repatriation. This is the return of apprehended Mexicans to remote locations by Border Patrol rather than the nearest Mexican port of entry.

=== Operation Streamline ===
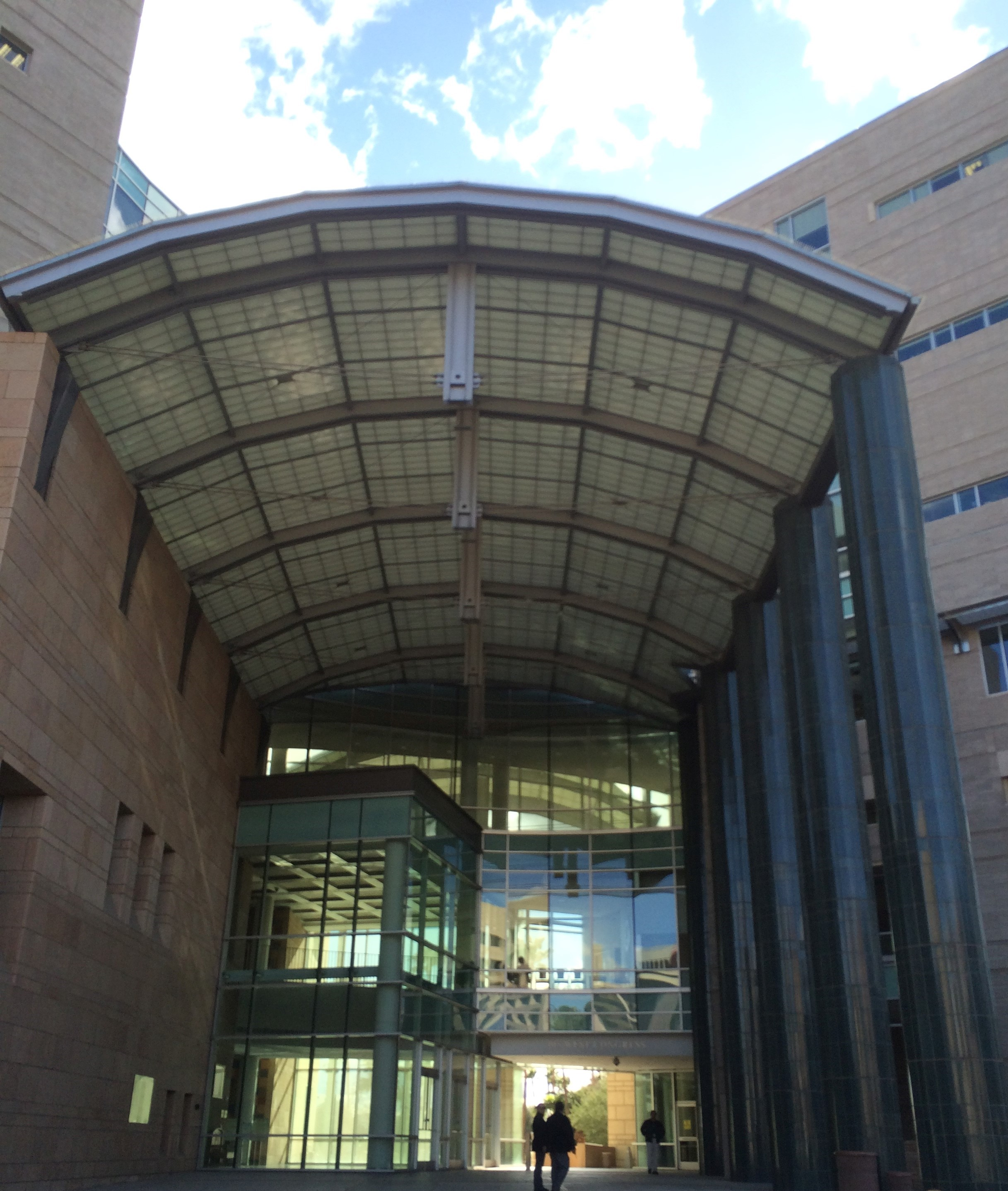
Federal courthouse in Tucson, Arizona, where Operation Streamline proceedings take place

Operation Streamline refers collectively to zero-tolerance policies implemented at the Mexico–U.S. border that seek to remove illegal immigrants through an expedited process if they have arrived with missing or fraudulent identification or have previously been convicted of an immigration crime. It was first implemented in Del Rio, Texas, in 2005. The program has since expanded to four out of the five federal judicial districts on the U.S.–Mexico border: Yuma, Arizona; Laredo, Texas; Tucson, Arizona; and Rio Grande Valley, Texas.

Previously, immigrants apprehended at the border were either given the option to voluntarily return to their home country or they were placed in civil immigration proceedings. After Operation Streamline was implemented, nearly all people apprehended at the border who are suspected of having crossed illegally are subject to criminal prosecution. Defendants who are charged with crossing into the U.S. illegally are tried en masse to determine their guilt. Defense attorneys often are responsible for representing up to 40 immigrants at once. Around 99% of defendants in Operation Streamline proceedings plead guilty. The defendants are charged with a misdemeanor if convicted of crossing the border illegally for the first time and a felony if it is a repeat offense. In December 2009, it was decided in United States v. Roblero-Solis that en masse judicial proceedings like those in Operation Streamline violated Rule 11 in the Federal Rules of Criminal Procedure. Rule 11 states that the court must determine that a guilty plea is voluntarily made by addressing the defendant personally in court. The Roblero-Solis case determined that "personally" means that the judge must address the defendant in a person-to-person manner. Though many courts have changed their procedures to adapt to the ruling, there are still forms of en masse trials practiced at the border.

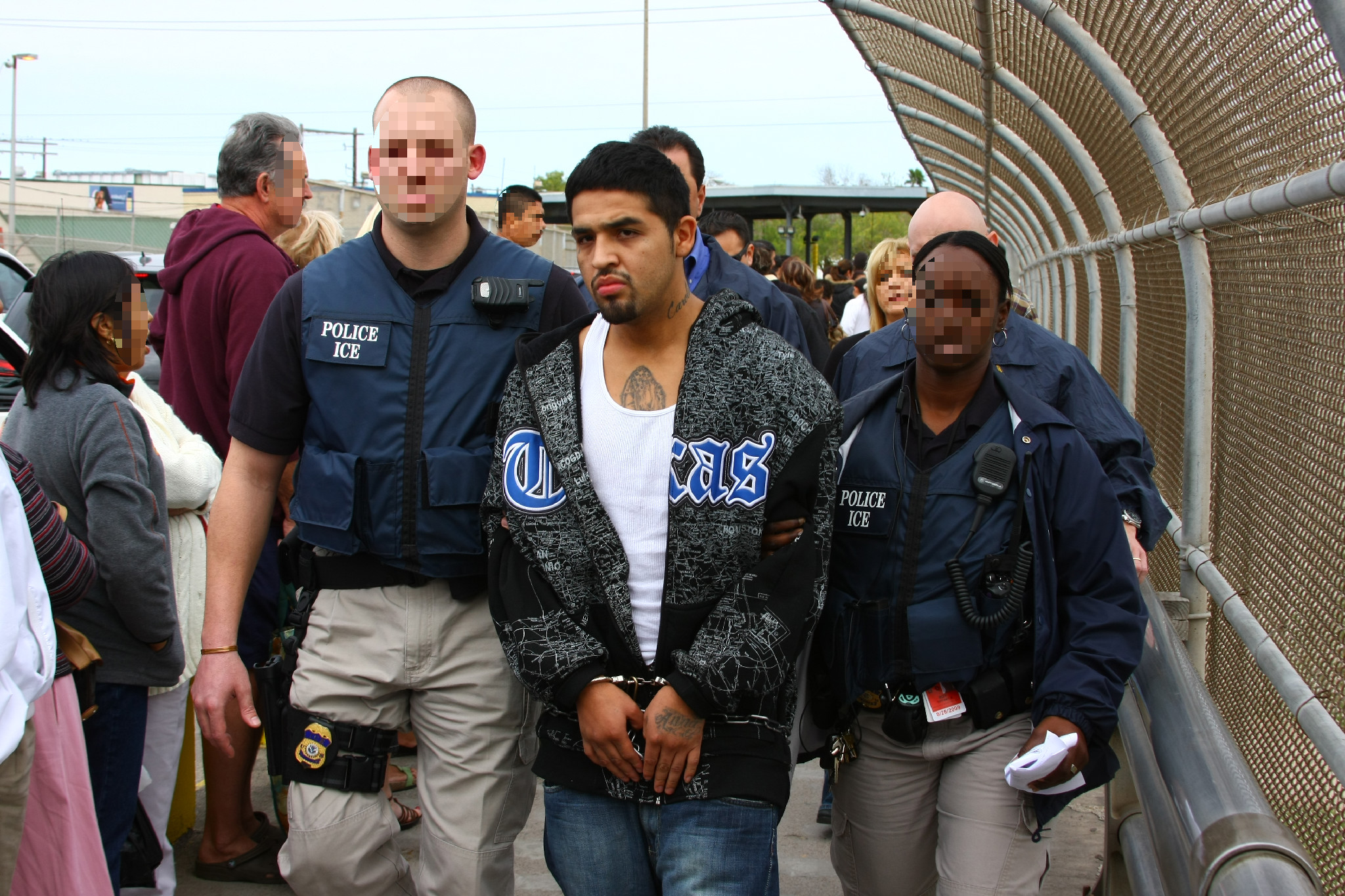
ICE ERO officers deporting a man wanted for two murders in Mexico

Proponents of Operation Streamline claim that the harsher prosecution has been an important factor in deterring immigrants from crossing the border illegally. Apprehensions have decreased in certain sectors after 2005, which is seen as a sign of success. For example, the Del Rio sector saw a decline from 2005 to 2009 of 75% (from 68,510 to 17,082). Similarly, apprehensions declined in Yuma by 95% (from 138,438 to 6,951) from 2006 to 2009. Criticisms of Operation Streamline point to the program's heavy use of federal court and enforcement resources as a negative aspect. In addition, the prosecution of all illegal border crossings takes the focus away from prosecuting more serious crimes. They claim that the program's cost is too high for the effectiveness of the work it is accomplishing. In response to the claim that Operation Streamline is an effective deterrent, critics of the program claim that the incentives to cross the border to work or be with family are much stronger.

== Environment ==
The Agreement on Cooperation for the Protection and Improvement of the Environment in the Border Area, known as the La Paz Agreement, was signed into law on August 14, 1983, and became enforceable on February 16, 1984. This agreement to protect the environment is the political foundation between the U.S. and Mexico for 4 subsequent programs. Each program has addressed environmental destruction in the border region resulting from the rise of the maquiladora industries, those who migrated to northern Mexico to work in the industries, the lack of infrastructure to accommodate the people, Mexico's lax regulations concerning all these factors, the resulting spillover into the U.S. The programs were: IBEP (1992), Border XXI (1996), Border 2012 (2003), and Border 2020 (2012).

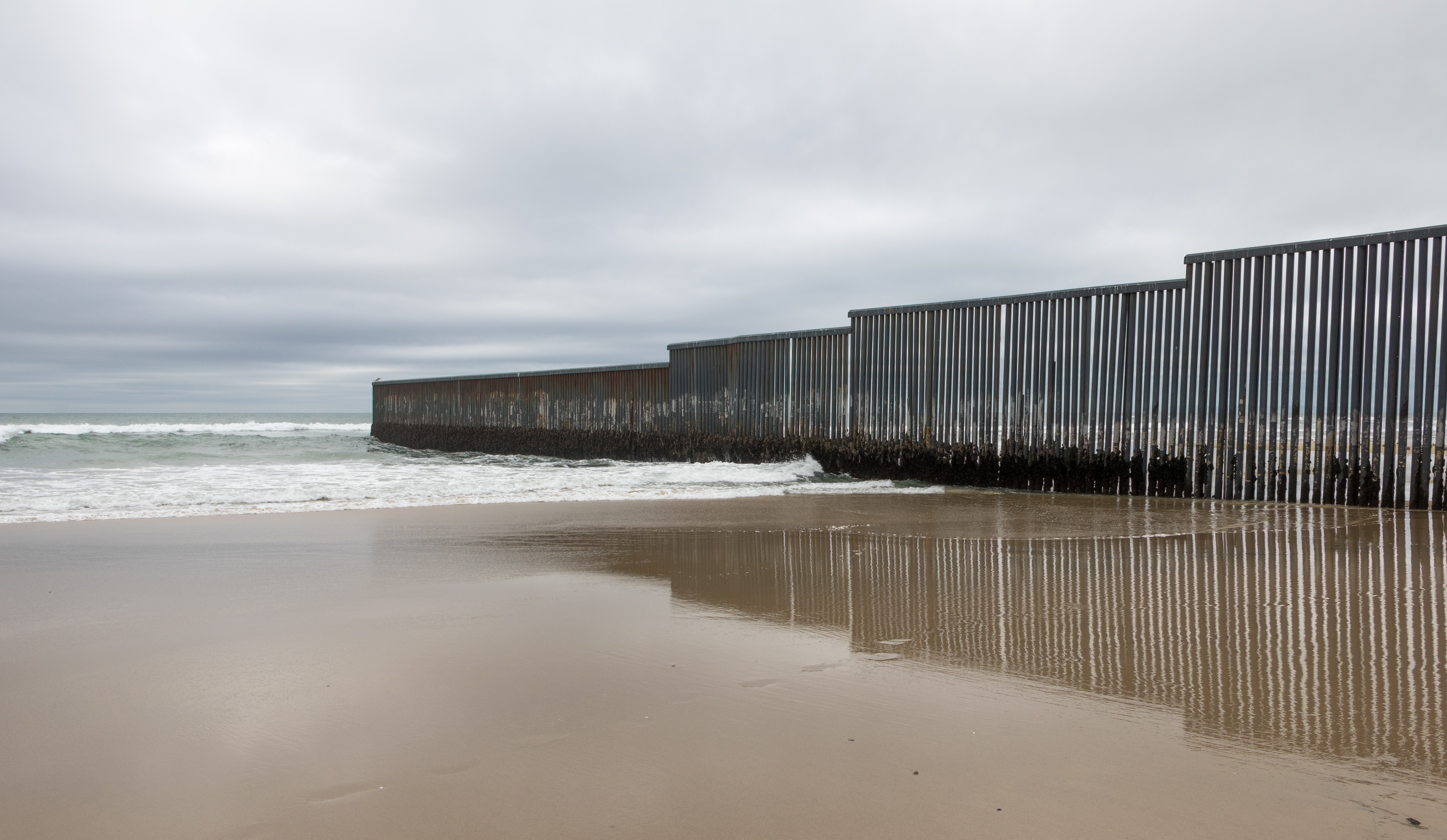
Mexico–U.S. border wall at Tijuana, Mexico

In 2006, during the presidency of George W. Bush, Congress approved the Secure Fence Act, which allowed the Department of Homeland Security to erect a border fence along the U.S.–Mexico border. Congress also approved a different law called the REAL ID Act, which gave the Department of Homeland Security the approval to build the wall without taking into consideration the environmental and legal issues related to the wall. The U.S. Congress insisted that the act was passed for the sake of national security of the U.S.

According to a delegation of Arizona park and refuge managers, wildlife biologists, and conservationists who studied the U.S. Mexico border, building a wall along the Mexico border would also have negative impacts on the natural environment in the region. They argued that the border wall would negatively affect the wildlife in the Sonoran Desert, including plants and animals. Naturally, animals do not tend to stay in one place, and instead, they migrate to various places for water, plants, and other means to survive. The wall would restrict animals to a specific territory and would reduce their chances of survival. According to Brian Segee, a staff attorney with Wildlife Activists, says that except for high-flying birds, animals would not be able to move to other places because of the wall along the border. For instance, participants in this study argued that some species, such as javelinas, ocelots, and Sonoran pronghorn would not be able to freely move along the border areas. It would also restrict the movement of jaguars from Sierra Madre Occidental forests to the southwestern parts of the U.S. According to Brian Nowicki, a conservation biologist at the Center for Biological Diversity, there are 30 animal species living in Arizona and Sonora that face danger. In 2021, an endangered Mexican gray wolf was stopped from crossing from New Mexico into Mexico by a section of border wall.

== Drug trafficking ==
In 2018, Mexico was estimated to be the world's third-largest producer of opium with poppy cultivation. It also was a major supplier of heroin and the largest foreign supplier of marijuana, cocaine and methamphetamine to the U.S. market. According to the DEA (2016), about 93% of the cocaine in the United States came from Colombia and was smuggled across the Mexico–United States border. In 2017, the INL estimated that "between 90 and 94 percent of all heroin consumed in the United States" came from Mexico. These drugs are supplied by drug trafficking organizations. The U.S. government has estimated that Mexican drug cartels gain tens of billions of dollars each year from drug sales in the U.S. alone.

Border towns on the Mexico–United States border have been negatively affected by the opioid crisis in the United States. According to César González Vaca, head of the Forensic Doctors' Service in Baja California, "It seems the closer we are to the border, the more consumption of this drug we see." In 2021, around 80,411 people died from opioid overdoses in the United States. Many of the deaths are from an extremely potent opioid, fentanyl, which is trafficked from Mexico. The drug is usually manufactured in China, then shipped to Mexico, where it is processed and packaged, which is then smuggled into the United States by Mexican drug cartels. In 2023, the Biden administration announced a crackdown on members of the Sinaloa Cartel smuggling fentanyl into the United States.

== Transborder students ==
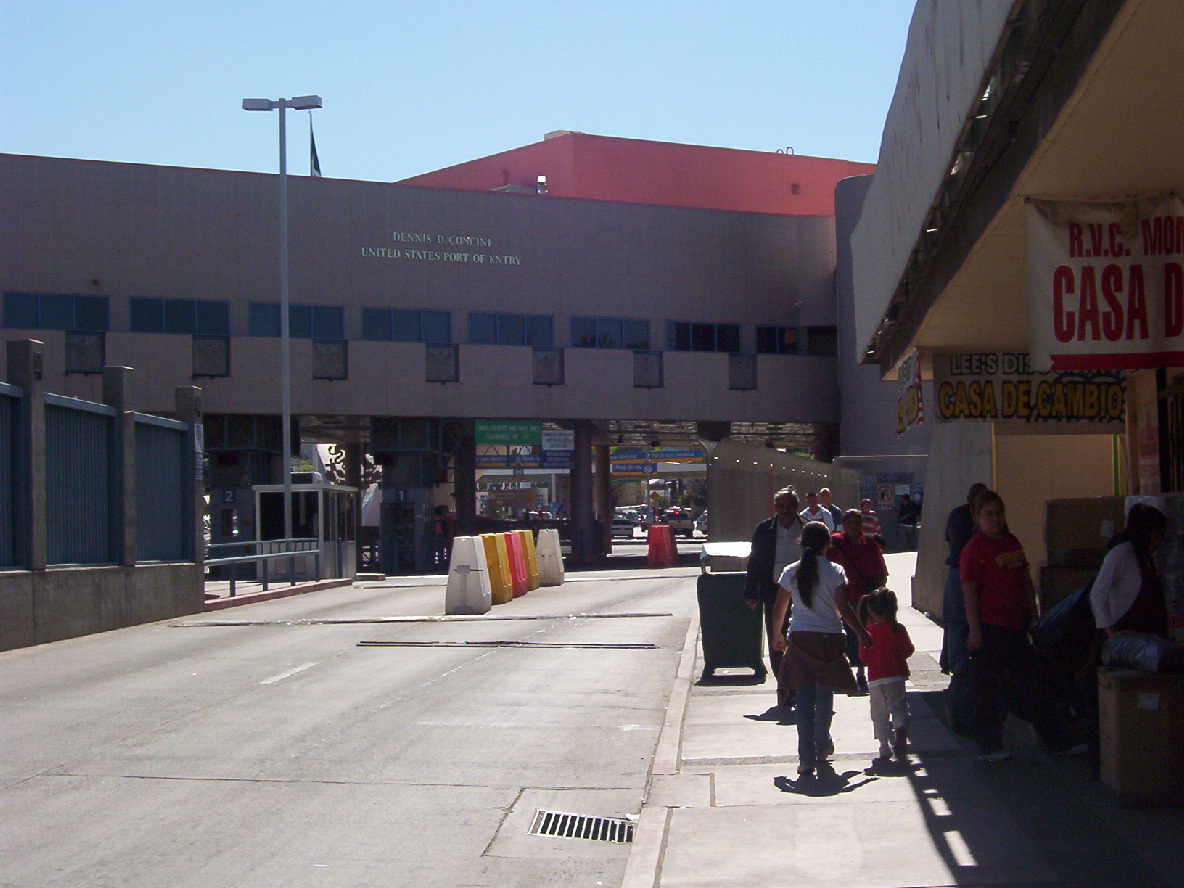
Entrance into Mexico at Nogales, AZ

Many schools near the border in America have students who live on the Mexican side of the border. These students are "transborder students", as they live in Mexico but are enrolled in the U.S. education system. There are thousands of elementary through high school students who cross the Mexican-American border. They are known to wake up in the early hours of the morning to make their way to the border, where they wait in long lines to cross into the U.S. After crossing the border, the students find a ride to school. Many students come to America for the opportunity because it has a more developed and organized educational system. Students who go to school in America have a better chance of reaching higher education in the U.S. In many parts of Mexico, compulsory education ends at age sixteen. Many of the transborder students are natural-born U.S. citizens. Students who were born in America have the right to an American education, even if they do not live in the U.S. In places like the San Diego-Tijuana border, it is much cheaper to live in Mexico. San Diego has a high cost of living and one of the highest student homelessness rates in the country, so many families move to Tijuana because it is more affordable to raise a family.

To prevent Mexican children from illegally coming to America for education, some border-town schools require official documentation (bills, mail, etc.) from students. This is to ensure that only students who are entitled to an education in the U.S. receive one. In Brownsville, a city on the southern border of Texas, a court ruled that school districts cannot deny students education if they have the proper paperwork. Many transborder students who live in these districts with these requirements will use extended family members' addresses to prove their residency. Questions about the legitimacy of student residency have risen since the Trump administration took office in 2017, making it riskier to cross the border for education. These transborder students also raise questions about the acquisition of healthcare, as most Mexican students who attend university in the U.S., who also have family across the border, are known to use the Mexican healthcare system instead of U.S. or university sources. The opposite case was also studied, seeking to find if U.S. students and citizens outsource their medical care from Mexican hospitals; however it was concluded that the use of, "cross-border healthcare diminishes significantly with English language acquisition."

Also researched is the impact of changing education for those children who attended school in the U.S. before deportation and are now readjusting to a new education system within Mexico. In one study, when repatriated children were asked about how their world perspectives were changed once they returned to Mexico, they spoke to three main areas: "shifting identities, learning and losing named language, and schooling across borders." The most frequent point mentioned in terms of changing schooling is the difficulty to adapt to a system in which they are unfamiliar, in a named language they might have lost, and where there is minimal continuity in the methodology of teaching. It is suggested in this study that while the U.S. has a long history of teaching immigrant students, along with tried and tested assimilation programming to support foreign children in U.S. border schools, Mexican systems do not, making the change nearly impossible for newly deported students to learn. While the Mexican Secretariat of Public Education has vowed to change the legislation surrounding this issue, bilingual education is still only awarded to expensive private schools.

== See also ==
- Indigenous conflicts on the Mexico–United States barrier
- 2017 Mexico–United States diplomatic crisis
- Border Protection, Anti-terrorism, and Illegal Immigration Control Act of 2005
- Border War (1910–19)
- Canada–United States border
- Illegal drug trade in the United States
- Illegal immigration to Mexico
- Illegal immigration to the United States
- List of municipalities (municipios) and counties on the Mexico–United States border
- Mexico–United States international park
- Mexico–United States relations
- Operation Jump Start
- Operation Phalanx (2010–2016)
- Roosevelt Reservation
- Mexican drug war Spillover
- Secure Fence Act of 2006
- Sexual assault of migrants from Latin America to the United States
- Treaty of Limits (Mexico–United States)
- United States Border Patrol interior checkpoints
