= Timeline of geopolitical changes (1900–1999) =

- Timeline of geopolitical changes (before 1500); Timeline of geopolitical changes (1500–1899); Timeline of geopolitical changes (1900–1999); Timeline of geopolitical changes (2000–present)

This is a timeline of geopolitical changes around the world between 1900 and 1999. It includes dates of declarations of independence, changes in country name, changes of capital city or name, and changes in territory such as the annexation, cession, concession, occupation, or secession of land. Territorial conquests as a result of war are included on the timeline at the conclusion of military campaigns, but changes in the course of specific battles and day-to-day operations are generally not included. Changes in airspace and maritime territory are included only when they are subject to a dispute. (Note: Lists of non-disputed maritime claims can be found in the articles on exclusive economic zones and maritime boundary treaties.) Over 50% of the world's borders today were drawn as a result of British and French imperialism. The British and French drew the modern borders of the Middle East, 80% of the borders of Africa, in Asia after the independence of the British Raj and French Indochina and the borders of Europe after World War I as victors, as a result of the Paris treaties.

== 1900s ==
Year	Date	Event
1900	1 January	The Northern Nigeria Protectorate and Southern Nigeria Protectorate are established by the United Kingdom.
1900	16 February	The United States of America takes control of American Samoa under the terms of the Tripartite Convention.
1900	March	The First Republic of Acre capitulates and is reabsorbed by the Republic of Bolivia.
1900	21 April	The United Kingdom annexes the island of Niue, making it a British protectorate.
1900	28 May	The United Kingdom occupies the Orange Free State.
1900	5 September	The colony of French Chad is established. Fort-Lamy is the capital.
1900	November	Acre declares independence from Bolivia as the Second Republic of Acre. The movement is quickly suppressed and Acre remains part of Bolivia.
1900		The border between the Republic of the United States of Brazil and the French colony of Guyane (French Guiana) is defined by arbitration. The French troops that advanced to the margins of the Araguari River repair to the Oiapoque River.
1901	1 January	The Commonwealth of Australia is established by federation of the British colonies of New South Wales, Victoria, Queensland, South Australia, Western Australia and Tasmania. Melbourne was the de facto (but not de jure) seat of government from 1901 to 1927.
1901	23 March	The First Philippine Republic dissolves.
1901	11 June	The United Kingdom transfers the Cook Islands and Niue to the Colony of New Zealand.
1901	26 September	The United Kingdom occupies the Ashanti Empire and makes it a Crown colony.
1902	18 March	The Crown colony of British New Guinea is transferred from the United Kingdom to Australia, which reorganizes it as the Territory of Papua.
1902	20 May	The Republic of Cuba gains independence from the United States of America. Havana is the capital.
1902	31 May	The United Kingdom creates the Orange River Colony from the Orange Free State and the Transvaal Colony from the South African Republic (Republic of Transvaal). Bloemfontein and Pretoria remains the respective capitals.
1902	1 July	The United Kingdom annexes Henderson Island.
1902	10 July	The United Kingdom annexes Oeno Island.
1902	20 November	King Edward VII of Britain adjusts borders in the Cordillera of the Andes Boundary Case between Chile and Argentina.
1902	19 December	The United Kingdom annexes Ducie Island.
1902		The Zaria Emirate and the Abuja Emirate are annexed into the British Northern Nigeria Protectorate.
1902		German Kamerun annexes the Mandara Kingdom.
1903	27 January	The Third Republic of Acre declares its independence from Bolivia. The capital is Cidade do Acre.
1903	23 February	Cuba leases Guantanamo Bay to the United States of America in perpetuity.
1903	12 May	Mauritania becomes a protectorate of the French Republic. Saint-Louis is the capital.
1903	29 July	The Adamawa Emirate is annexed into the British Northern Nigeria Protectorate and German Kamerun.
1903	20 October	The Alaska boundary dispute is resolved between the United States of America and Canada.
1903	3 November	The Republic of Panama secedes from the Republic of Colombia. Panama City is the capital.
1903	11 November	The Republic of Bolivia and the Republic of the United States of Brazil sign the Treaty of Petrópolis. Bolivia receives land in Mato Grosso from Brazil, and Brazil absorbs the Republic of Acre.
1903	18 November	The new Republic of Panama grants the United States of America control of the Panama Canal Zone. Balboa is the administrative center.
1903		The United Kingdom secedes the Seychelles from the colony of Mauritius.
1903		After the Aceh War, the Sultanate of Aceh is annexed by the Kingdom of the Netherlands and becomes part of the Dutch East Indies.
1904	13 February	Following the Franco-Siamese Convention, the Kingdom of Siam concedes border territories to French Indochina in exchange for French-occupied Chantaburi.
1904	4 May	The United States of America annexed the Panama Canal Zone.
1904	4 October	The Franco-Spanish Convention of Paris acknowledges formal control of Saguia el-Hamra (later northern Spanish Sahara) by the Kingdom of Spain.
1904		The border between the Republic of the United States of Brazil and British Guiana is defined by arbitration. Approximately half of the disputed land goes to each side.
1904		French Dahomey is established. Porto-Novo is the capital.
1904		The Kingdom of Champasak is annexed by France and becomes part of the French protectorate of Laos.
1905	7 June	The Kingdom of Norway declares its independence from the United Kingdoms of Sweden and Norway through dissolution of the personal union with Kingdom of Sweden.
1905	5 September	The Liaodong Peninsula and the Russian railway in south Manchuria are leased to the Empire of Japan following the Treaty of Portsmouth.
1905	5 September	The Empire of Japan annexes Sakhalin Island south of 50° N following the Treaty of Portsmouth.
1905	26 October	The Kingdom of Sweden recognizes the union dissolution and the independence of Kingdom of Norway.
1905		The United Kingdom moves the capital of the East Africa Protectorate from Mombasa to Nairobi.
1906	1 May	The British Colony of Lagos and the Southern Nigeria Protectorate merge to form the Colony and Protectorate of Southern Nigeria.
1906		The French Republic divides its colony of French Congo into the colonies of Gabon and Middle Congo. Libreville remains the capital of Gabon. Brazzaville becomes the capital of Middle Congo.
1906		The United Kingdom and France jointly administer the New Hebrides. Port Vila is the capital.
1907	23 March	The Kingdom of Siam concedes territory to French Indochina in exchange for Trat.
1907	24 April	The border between the Republic of the United States of Brazil and the Republic of Colombia is defined by the Bogotá Treaty. Brazil gains lands on the margins of the Solimoes River at the area known as Cabeça de Cachorro ("The Dog's Head").
1907	6 July	The British Central Africa Protectorate is renamed to Nyasaland Protectorate.
1907	26 September	New Zealand becomes a Dominion within the British Empire under the name Dominion of New Zealand. Wellington is the capital. The Dominion of Newfoundland is also declared the same day. St. John's is the capital.
1907	16 November	Oklahoma is admitted to the Union as the 46th State of the United States.
1907	17 December	Ugyen Wangchuck establishes the Kingdom of Bhutan. Punakha is the winter capital and Thimphu is the summer capital.
1908	5 October	The Kingdom of Bulgaria gains independence from the Ottoman Empire. Sofia is the capital.
1908	6 October	Austria-Hungary formally annexes the Ottoman Vilayet of Bosnia (under de facto Austro-Hungarian rule since the Treaty of Berlin 1878) as the Condominium of Bosnia and Herzegovina (causing the Bosnian crisis).
1908	15 November	King Leopold II of Belgium sells his private Congo Free State to the Kingdom of Belgium. The colony is renamed the Belgian Congo.
1909	9 July	The Kingdom of Siam transfers its southernmost provinces to British Malaya in the Anglo-Siamese Treaty of 1909.

== 1910s ==
Year	Date	Event
1910	15 January	The French Republic creates French Equatorial Africa from its colonies of Gabon, Middle Congo, and Oubangui-Chari. Libreville and Bangui yield to Brazzaville as the capital.
1910	29 March	23 bancos are annexed by Mexico from the United States and 34 bancos are annexed by the United States of America from Mexico with the first application of the Banco Convention of 1905.
1910	31 May	The Cape Colony, the Colony of Natal, the Transvaal, and the Orange River Colony unite as the Union of South Africa, which is established as a Dominion under the terms of the South Africa Act 1909.
1910	20 August	Canada rescinds its claim to Pope's Folly Island in a treaty with the United States of America.
1910	22 August	The Korean Empire capitulates and is annexed by the Empire of Japan.
1910	5 October	The first Portuguese Republic supersedes the Kingdom of Portugal.
1910		The Kasanje Kingdom is annexed to Portuguese Angola.
1911	17 August	The United Kingdom unites Barotziland–North-Western Rhodesia and North-Eastern Rhodesia to form Northern Rhodesia.
1911	4 November	In the Morocco–Congo Treaty, Germany acquires the Neukamerun region from France in exchange for abandoning German claims in Morocco.
1911	29 December	The Bogd Khanate of Mongolia declares independence from the Qing dynasty of China. Niislel Khüree is the capital.
1911		The capital of British India is moved from Calcutta to New Delhi.
1912	1 January	The Republic of China overthrows the Qing dynasty of China in the Xinhai Revolution. Nanking is the provisional capital.
1912	6 January	New Mexico is admitted to the Union as the 47th State of the United States.
1912	14 February	Arizona is admitted to the Union as the 48th State of the United States.
1912	30 March	The Treaty of Fez formally re-establishes Morocco as a French Protectorate.
1912	7 November	Mexico annexes 20 bancos from the United States and the United States of America annexes 11 bancos from Mexico.
1912	27 November	The Treaty Between France and Spain Regarding Morocco assigns the northern and southern strips of Morocco to Spain.
1912	28 November	Albania declares its independence from the Ottoman Empire. Tirana is the capital.
1912		The Wadai Empire is disestablished and annexed into French Chad.
1913	13 February	Tibet declares independence from the Republic of China.
1913	May	The Imamate of Oman rebels against the Sultanate of Muscat and Oman. Nizwa becomes the capital after it is conquered on 5 June.
1913	10 August	Following the First Balkan War, the Treaty of Bucharest is signed, by the terms of which: Bulgaria gains Western Thrace and the southern portions of what are now Blagoevgrad Province and Burgas Province.; Romania gains Southern Dobruja.; Serbia gains Kosovo, most of what is now the Republic of Northern Macedonia, and some new land to the west of its previous borders.; Greece gains Epirus, West Macedonia, Central Macedonia, and most of the islands in the Aegean Sea that it did not control before the war.; Albania gains southern, eastern, and northern lands that bring it to its current borders.; Albania becomes officially independent, though large portions of its lands remain disputed.; Montenegro gains most of what is now its Northern Region.
1913	29 September	Following the Second Balkan War, the Treaty of Constantinople is signed, by the terms of which: The Ottoman Empire regains the portions of Eastern Thrace it lost in the First Balkan War.; The Balkan League gains all Ottoman territory west of the line joining Enez and Kıyıköy; thus the Ottomans lose all their European territory, except for what is roughly the southeastern half of Turkey's present-day European territory.
1914	1 January	The United Kingdom unites the Colony and Protectorate of Southern Nigeria and the Northern Nigeria Protectorate to form the Colony and Protectorate of Nigeria. Lagos is the capital.
1914	7 March	Albania becomes the Principality of Albania.
1914	17 April	Tannu Uriankhai is officially made a protectorate of the Russian Empire.
1914	28 July	Following the assassination of Archduke Franz Ferdinand, Austria-Hungary declares war on Serbia, precipitating the First World War.
1914	1 September	The Russian Empire changes the name of its capital from Saint Petersburg to Petrograd.
1914		The Kingdom of Kongo is annexed to Portuguese Angola.
1915	1 May	The Panama Canal Zone border is redefined between Panama and the United States of America resulting in slight territory changes.
1915	27 May	The United States of America annexes some more land around the Rio Chagres mouth in the Panama Canal Zone due to the Hay–Bunau-Varilla Treaty.
1915	18 October	The German Empire creates the Government General of Warsaw from the parts of Poland conquered by the Russian Empire.
1915	8 December	The United States of America annexes a triangle of island between the Rio Chagres, Caribbean Sea and the Panama Canal Zone.
1915	12 December	Hongxian proclaims the Empire of China. Beijing is the capital.
1916	22 March	The Empire of China is abolished.
1916	5 November	Germany and Austria-Hungary proclaim the establishment of the Kingdom of Poland. Warsaw is the capital.
1917	15 March	The Provisional Government of Russia supersedes the Russian Empire in the wake of the February Revolution.
1917	31 March	Under the Treaty of the Danish West Indies, the United States of America acquires the Danish West Indies (excluding Water Island) from the Kingdom of Denmark, renaming them the United States Virgin Islands.
1917	12 April	The Autonomous Governorate of Estonia is created from the Governorate of Estonia and some of the Governorate of Livonia of the Russian Empire.
1917	1 July	Xuantong is reinstalled as Emperor of China in an event now called the Manchu Restoration.
1917	12 July	End of the Manchu Restoration in China.
1917	14 September	The Russian Republic supersedes the Provisional Government of Russia.
1917	7 November	The Russian Soviet Federative Socialist Republic supersedes the Russian Republic.
1917	28 November	The Provincial Assembly of the Autonomous Governorate of Estonia declares itself to be the only legally elected and constituted authority in Estonia, de facto declaring sovereignty from the Russian Soviet Federative Socialist Republic. The Provincial Assembly is thereafter forced underground by the Russian SFSR powers which continues to treat Estonia as an autonomous, but not sovereign governorate.
1917	2 December	The Emirate of Chechenia declares its independence from the Russian Soviet Federative Socialist Republic. Vedeno is the capital.
1917	6 December	The Republic of Finland gains independence from the Russian Soviet Federative Socialist Republic. Helsinki is the capital.
1917	22 December	The Independent State of Flanders declares its independence from the Kingdom of Belgium. Brussels is the capital.
1918	22 January	The Ukrainian People's Republic gains independence from the Russian Soviet Federative Socialist Republic. Kiev is the capital.
1918	3 January	After a plebiscite in Narva on 23 December 1917, the town, including its Ivangorod (Jaanilinn) district across the Narva River, is ceded from the Saint Petersburg Governorate to the Autonomous Governorate of Estonia.
1918	16 February	The State of Lithuania declares its independence from the Russian Soviet Federative Socialist Republic. Vilnius is named the capital despite occupation by the Kingdom of Poland.
1918	24 February	The Republic of Estonia declares independence from the Russian Soviet Federative Socialist Republic. Tallinn is the capital.
1918	3 March	The Treaty of Brest-Litovsk creates many new states out of the western Russian Empire.
1918	12 March	The Russian Soviet Federative Socialist Republic moves its capital from Petrograd to Moscow.
1918	25 March	The Abkhazian Republic (Abkhazia) gains independence from the Russian Soviet Federative Socialist Republic. Sukhumi is the capital.
1918	25 March	The Belarusian People's Republic declares its independence from the Russian Soviet Federative Socialist Republic. Minsk and Hrodna are named the joint capitals.
1918	27 March	The Union of Bessarabia with Romania is proclaimed by the Treaty of Paris (1920).
1918	19 April	The Transcaucasian Democratic Federative Republic declares independence from Russian Soviet Federative Socialist Republic and annexes the Abkhazian Republic (Abkhazia).
1918	22 April	The Transcaucasian Democratic Federative Republic gains independence from the Russian Soviet Federative Socialist Republic. Tbilisi is the capital.
1918	11 May	The Mountainous Republic of the Northern Caucasus annexes the Emirate of Chechenia.
1918	26 May	The Democratic Republic of Georgia secedes from the Transcaucasian Democratic Federative Republic. Tbilisi is the capital.
1918	28 May	Armenia and the Azerbaijan Democratic Republic dissolve the Transcaucasian Democratic Federative Republic. Yerevan and Baku are the respective capitals.
1918	30 May	Armenia changes its name to the Democratic Republic of Armenia.
1918	9 July	The Kingdom of Lithuania supersedes the State of Lithuania.
1918	10 July	The Russian Socialist Federative Soviet Republic supersedes the Soviet Russian Republic.
1918	12 July	The United States of America annexes 2.6 hectares (6.4 acres) of land at Punta Paitilla for the Panama Canal Zone.
1918	25 July	The Kingdom of Belgium reabsorbs the Independent State of Flanders.
1918	21 August	The United States of America annexes land between Rio Chagres and Quebrada Majagual for the Panama Canal Zone.
1918	29 October	The State of Slovenes, Croats and Serbs proclaims independence from the Austro-Hungarian Empire. Zagreb is the capital.
1918	31 October	The Kingdom of Hungary declares the monarchy abolished. Budapest is the capital.
1918	1 November	The Mutawakkilite Kingdom of Yemen (North Yemen) gains independence from the Ottoman Empire. Sanaa becomes its capital.
1918	1 November	The Banat Republic is proclaimed.
1918	1 November	The short-lived West Ukrainian People's Republic is proclaimed.
1918	2 November	The Republic of Lithuania supersedes the Kingdom of Lithuania.
1918	10 November	The Republic of Alsace-Lorraine is proclaimed. Strasbourg is the capital.
1918	12 November	The Republic of German-Austria is proclaimed. Vienna is the capital.
1918	14 November	The Republic of Poland supersedes the Kingdom of Poland.
1918	15 November	The Kingdom of Serbia invades the short-lived Banat Republic and divides it between the Kingdom of Serbs, Croats and Slovenes and Romania.
1918	16 November	The Hungarian People's Republic supersedes the Kingdom of Hungary.
1918	18 November	The Republic of Latvia gains independence from the Russian Soviet Federative Socialist Republic. Riga is the capital.
1918	22 November	France annexes the Republic of Alsace-Lorraine.
1918	25 November	The de facto province of Vojvodina votes to join with the Kingdom of Serbia.
1918	28 November	The Kingdom of Serbia annexes the Kingdom of Montenegro.
1918	28 November	The Union of Bukovina with Romania is proclaimed.
1918	29 November	The Commune of the Working People of Estonia is established as a puppet state in Soviet Russian-occupied Estonia.
1918	1 December	Iceland, a dependent territory of the Kingdom of Denmark with home rule, becomes the fully sovereign Kingdom of Iceland in personal union with Denmark. Reykjavík is the capital.
1918	1 December	The State of Slovenes, Croats and Serbs and the Kingdom of Serbia unite to form the Kingdom of Serbs, Croats and Slovenes. Zagreb yields to Belgrade as the capital.
1918	1 December	The Union of Transylvania with Romania is proclaimed.
1918	11 December	The Slovak People's Republic is established.
1918	29 December	The Slovak People's Republic is disestablished, merged into the First Czechoslovak Republic.
1919	1 January	The Socialist Soviet Republic of Byelorussia supersedes the Belarusian People's Republic. Minsk and Smolensk remain joint capitals.
1919	8 January	The Hutsul Republic is established.
1919	27 February	The Lithuanian-Belorussian Soviet Socialist Republic supersedes the Socialist Soviet Republic of Byelorussia. Vilnius is the capital.
1919	1 March	The Oriental State of Uruguay changes its name to the Oriental Republic of Uruguay.
1919	1 March	French West Africa is reorganized, with Upper Volta as a separate colony.
1919	21 March	The Hungarian Soviet Republic supersedes the Hungarian People's Republic.
1919	6 April	The Bavarian Soviet Republic supersedes the People's State of Bavaria.
1919	19 April	Poland occupies Vilnius, which is disputed by the Lithuanians.
1919	3 May	The Free State of Bavaria supersedes the Bavarian Soviet Republic.
1919	6 May	The Kionga Triangle is assigned to Portugal as a mandate.
1919	6 May	Kamerun and Togoland are assigned to France and the United Kingdom as mandates, respectively.
1919	7 May	German New Guinea and the Bismarck Archipelago are assigned to Australia as a mandate.
1919	7 May	German Southwest Africa is assigned to South Africa as a mandate under the name South West Africa.
1919	7 May	German Samoa is assigned to New Zealand as a mandate under the name Territory of Western Samoa.
1919	7 May	The German Northern Pacific Islands are assigned to Japan as the South Seas Mandate.
1919	7 May	Nauru is assigned to the British Empire (eventually the United Kingdom, Australia, and New Zealand) as a mandate.
1919	30 May	Ruanda and Urundi (minus Kisaka district) are assigned to Belgium as a mandate.
1919	11 June	The Hutsul Republic is disestablished, incorporated into the First Czechoslovak Republic.
1919	28 June	In the aftermath of World War I, the Treaty of Versailles and the Little Treaty of Versailles are signed, by the terms of which: Eupen-Malmedy and Neutral Moresnet are ceded to Belgium.; Alsace-Lorraine is officially ceded to FranceFrance.; The Second Polish Republic is established in place of the puppet Kingdom of Poland. Most of Posen and West Prussia are ceded to Poland by Germany.; Memel and Saarland are put under international administration.; Plebiscites are provided for in Schleswig and Upper Silesia.; Danzig and the surrounding area are superseded by the Free City of Danzig, which is administered by the League of Nations.
1919	10 July	France and the United Kingdom agree on a frontier between their mandates in the Cameroons.
1919	2 August	The Hungarian People's Republic supersedes the Hungarian Soviet Republic.
1919	8 August	Afghanistan declares its independence from the United Kingdom.
1919	8 August	The Hungarian Republic supersedes the Hungarian People's Republic.
1919	11 August	The German Reich supersedes the German Empire.
1919	10 September	Austria signs the Treaty of Saint-Germain-en-Laye, by the terms of which: Eastern Galicia is ceded to PolandPoland.; South Tyrol, Trentino, Trieste, and Istria are ceded to ItalyItaly.; Romanian sovereignty over Bukovina is recognized (union declared on 28 November 1918).; The independence of Poland, CzechoslovakiaCzechoslovakia, and the Kingdom of Serbs, Croats and Slovenes is recognized.
1919	12 September	The Bonin–Pichon agreement transfers two desert strips from French control to Italian Libya.
1919	18 September	The United States of America annexes the island of Largo Remo for the Panama Canal Zone.
1919	25 September	Spitsbergen is awarded to Norway.
1919	27 November	Bulgaria signs the Treaty of Neuilly-sur-Seine, by the terms of which: Western Thrace is ceded to the Entente.; The Kingdom of Serbs, Croats and Slovenes is recognized and a small amount of land along the western border is ceded to it.; Dobruja is returned to the Kingdom of Romania.

== 1920s ==
Year	Date	Event
1920	10 January	The United Kingdom officially takes over administration of German East Africa and changes its name to Tanganyika.
1920	10 January	The League of Nations is founded.
1920	2 February	The Estonian War of Independence ends with the Treaty of Tartu, which awards areas around Ivangorod (Jaanilinn) and Pechory (Petseri) from Soviet Russia to Estonia.
1920	29 February	The Kingdom of Hungary supersedes the Hungarian Republic.
1920	6 April	The Far Eastern Republic is established. Chita becomes the capital.
1920	26 April	The Khorezm People's Soviet Republic supersedes the Khanate of Khiva.
1920	28 April	The Azerbaijani Soviet Socialist Republic supersedes the Azerbaijan Democratic Republic.
1920	Late April	Western Thrace is granted to the Kingdom of Greece by the Triple Entente.
1920	4 June	Hungary signs the Treaty of Trianon, by the terms of which: Transylvania and parts of Banat, Crișana, and Maramureș became part of the Kingdom of Romania.; Czechoslovakia is recognized.; The Kingdom of Serbs, Croats and Slovenes is recognized.
1920	5 June	The Socialist Soviet Republic of Gilan declares independence from the Qajar Iran. The capital is Rasht.
1920	9 July	Denmark officially incorporates Northern Schleswig following a plebiscite held earlier in the year.
1920	23 July	The United Kingdom creates the Colony of Kenya from most part of the East Africa Protectorate.
1920	25 September	The Sultanate of Muscat and Oman is reunified through an agreement which grants substantial autonomy and self-government to the Imamate of Oman but recognizes the sovereignty of the Sultanate of Muscat.
1920	8 October	The Bukharan People's Soviet Republic supersede the Emirate of Bukhara.
1920	29 November	The Armenian Soviet Socialist Republic supersedes the Democratic Republic of Armenia.
1920	29 November	The remaining part of the East Africa Protectorate is renamed to the Protectorate of Kenya.
1921	25 February	The Georgian Soviet Socialist Republic supersedes the Democratic Republic of Georgia.
1921	18 March	The Peace of Riga defines new borders between Poland and Soviet Russia, Soviet Ukraine, and Soviet Belarus.
1921	1 June	France reorganizes French West Africa and the colony of Mauritania is established.
1921	5 June	The Socialist Soviet Republic of Gilan is renamed to the Persian Socialist Soviet Republic.
1921	14 August	The Tuvan People's Republic supersedes Tannu Uriankhai and changes the name of its capital from Belotsarsk to Kyzyl.
1921	September	The Persian Socialist Soviet Republic officially came to an end.
1921	18 September	The Rif Republic is declared in Spanish Morocco with no recognition.
1921	12 October	Upper Silesia is divided between Poland and Germany.
1921	13 October	In the Treaty of Kars, Turkey relinquishes claims to Armenia but gains the area around Kars and southern Achara.
1921	13 October	Niger is established as a separate French colony. Zinder becomes the capital.
1921	2 November	The Emirate of Jabal Shammar is defeated and annexed by the Sultanate of Nejd after the Conquest of Ha'il.
1921	22 November	The United Kingdom recognizes the independence of Afghanistan.
1922	28 February	The Kingdom of Egypt gains independence from the United Kingdom. Cairo is the capital.
1922	12 March	The Georgian Soviet Socialist Republic, Azerbaijani Soviet Socialist Republic, and the Armenian Soviet Socialist Republic unite to form the Transcaucasian Socialist Federative Soviet Republic. Baku and Yerevan yield to Tbilisi as the capital.
1922	15 November	The Far Eastern Republic is disestablished and merged with the Russian Socialist Federative Soviet Republic.
1922	17 November	The Ottoman Empire is dissolved. Its territories are mostly made protectorates of the victorious Allies of World War I.
1922	6 December	The Irish Free State is constituted as an independent Dominion formed through the secession of the island of Ireland from the United Kingdom of Great Britain and Ireland. Dublin is the capital.
1922	8 December	Northern Ireland secedes from the Irish Free State to again form a constituent country of the United Kingdom of Great Britain and Ireland.
1922	30 December	The Russian Socialist Federative Soviet Republic, the Transcaucasian Socialist Federative Soviet Republic, the Ukrainian Soviet Socialist Republic, and the Byelorussian Soviet Socialist Republic unite to form the Union of Soviet Socialist Republics (Soviet Union). Tbilisi, Kharkov, and Smolensk yield to Moscow as the capital.
1923	1 February	The United States of America annexes the future location of Madden Lake for the Panama Canal Zone.
1923	29 October	The Republic of Turkey is established following the fall of the Ottoman Empire. Ankara is the capital.
1923	15 November	Honduras claims Swan Islands, creating a dispute with the United States of America.
1923		The Kingdom of Belgium moves the capital of its colony of the Congo from Boma to Leopoldville.
1924	17 February	The Bukharan People's Soviet Republic joins the Soviet Union.
1924	27 October	The Khorezm People's Soviet Republic joins the Soviet Union.
1924	26 November	The Mongolian People's Republic is established. Ulaanbaatar is the capital.
1925	1 January	The Kingdom of Norway changes the name of its capital from Kristiania to Oslo.
1925	22 January	The Republic of Albania supersedes the Principality of Albania.
1925	4 March	The United States of America annexes Swains Island as part of American Samoa.
1925	29 June	Britain transfers control of northern Jubaland to Italy, becoming the Italian colony of Oltre Giuba.
1925	1 July	The Republic of China relocates its provisional capital from Nanking to Canton.
1925	17 July	A treaty between the United States of America and Canada slightly adjusts the border between the two. Overall the United States gained between 30 and 35 acres.
1925	1 September	Tarata is returned to Peru by Chile.
1925	6 December	Britain adjusts the Egyptian border in favor of Italian Libya, giving it the Jarabub and Kufra oases.
1926	27 May	The Rif Republic is dissolved by Spanish and French occupation forces in Morocco.
1926	9 June	Afghanistan becomes the Kingdom of Afghanistan.
1926	30 June	Oltre Giuba is incorporated into Italian Somaliland.
1927	29 January	Within the Nejd and Hejaz, the Sultanate of Nejd is renamed the Kingdom of Nejd and its Dependencies.
1927	12 April	The United Kingdom of Great Britain and Ireland changes its name to the United Kingdom of Great Britain and Northern Ireland.
1927	9 May	The Commonwealth of Australia moves its seat of parliament from Melbourne to the purpose-built capital of Canberra.
1927	18 July	The United States of America annexes 38 hectares (94 acres) of Taboga and Taboguilla for the Panama Canal Zone.
1927	26 October	Two bancos along the Colorado River are ceded from Mexico to the United States of America.
1927	28 October	The Republic of Ararat declares independence from Turkey.
1927		In French Syria, the State of Souaida is renamed the Jabal Druze State, after the mountain called Jabal al-Druze.
1928	4 April	The United States of America cedes Palmas, American Territory of Philippines to the Netherlands after the Island of Palmas Case.
1928	23 April	41 bancos are exchanged between Mexico and the United States of America.
1928	26 May	The United States of America annexes the Las Adjuntas banco from Mexico.
1928	1 September	The Kingdom of Albania supersedes the Republic of Albania.
1928	24 September	The United States of America annexes 3 hectares (7.4 acres) of land at El Cerro de Doscientos Pies ("200-Foot Hill") near Las Minas Bay for the Panama Canal Zone.
1928	29 December	The Republic of China establishes Nanking as its official capital, later codified in the Constitution of the Republic of China.
1929	January	The Emirate of Afghanistan supersedes the Kingdom of Afghanistan.
1929	6 January	The Kingdom of Serbs, Croats and Slovenes is renamed the Kingdom of Yugoslavia.
1929	2 February	Norway claims Peter I Island.
1929	11 February	Vatican City gains independence from the Kingdom of Italy. Vatican City itself is the capital.
1929	3 June	The Treaty of Lima in which Chile and Peru draw a new border in which Arica and its surrounding towns remains in Chile and Tacna and surrounding towns is set to be given back to Peru.
1929	28 August	Tacna and its surrounding territory is returned to Peru by Chile.
1929	October	The Kingdom of Afghanistan supersedes the Emirate of Afghanistan.
1929	3 October	The Kingdom of Yugoslavia supersedes the Kingdom of Serbs, Croats and Slovenes.

== 1930s ==
Year	Date	Event
1930	4 February	The United States of America annexes the La Rana, El Pilon, Ojinaga, and El Mulato bancos from Mexico and Mexico annexes the Galindo, Haciendita, and San Rafael bancos from the United States.
1930	19 February	The United States of America annexes the Aguilar, Tabalopa, Quibira, and Los Puliques bancos from Mexico.
1930	3 March	The United States of America annexes the Bermudez, Compania Agricola, Charles Davis, Calero, Diablo, and Guayuco bancos from Mexico and Mexico annexes the Azcarate, Arroyo del Alamo, Newman, and Pruitt bancos from the United States.
1930	18 March	The United States of America annexes the Weber banco from Mexico.
1930	21 March	The United States of America annexes the San Lorenzo banco from Mexico.
1930	9 April	The United States of America annexes the Gallego and Nunez bancos from Mexico.
1930	25 April	The United States of America annexes the La Cachanilla, Rincon de Marcelino, and Camp Rice bancos from Mexico.
1930	28 April	The United States of America annexes the El Carino banco from Mexico.
1930	1 May	The United States of America annexes the Las Piedras and Max Muller bancos from Mexico.
1930	22 July	The United States of America annexes 25 hectares (62 acres) on Jicarita Island and 60 hectares (148 acres) at Punta Morro de Puercos for the Panama Canal Zone.
1930	1 October	British Weihaiwei is returned to China.
1930	11 November	Norway rescinds its claim to the Sverdrup Islands; in return, the United Kingdom recognizes the Norwegian claim to Jan Mayen.
1931	15 January	The Belgian concession within the city of Tientsin is returned to China.
1931	28 January	France officially annexes Isla de la Pasión as Clipperton Island.
1931	14 April	The Second Spanish Republic supersedes the Monarchy of Spain. The Catalan Republic subsequently declares independence from Spain.
1931	15 April	The United States of America annexes small areas around the Madden Dam for the Panama Canal Zone.
1931	28 April	The Catalan Republic is taken over by Spain.
1931	20 May	The United States of America annexes the La Pascualilla and Morales bancos from Mexico.
1931	22 May	Mexico annexes the Ochoa and El Jazmin bancos from the United States of America.
1931	12 June	The Australian territories of North Australia and Central Australia merge to form the Northern Territory.
1931	10 July	Norway claims territory in eastern Greenland as Erik the Red's Land.
1931	7 November	The Chinese Soviet Republic is established by the Chinese Communist Party as a group of discontiguous territories within the larger Republic of China.
1931	11 December	By the Statute of Westminster 1931, the Irish Free State and the Union of South Africa become fully sovereign states.
1932	18 February	The Empire of Japan takes over northeastern China and establishes Manchukuo. Hsinking becomes its capital.
1932	25 February	The United States of America annexes the El Morillo banco from Mexico.
1932	12 May	The United States of America annexes the Diablo Segundo banco from Mexico.
1932	17 May	Panama annexes a small area of land at Punta Paitilla from the United States' Panama Canal Zone.
1932	4 June	The Republic of Chile changes its name to the Socialist Republic of Chile.
1932	24 June	Following the revolution, Kingdom of Siam supersedes the Rattanakosin Kingdom. Bangkok remains the capital.
1932	13 September	The Socialist Republic of Chile changes its name back to the Republic of Chile.
1932	23 September	The personal union of the Kingdom of Nejd and Hejaz unify to form the Kingdom of Saudi Arabia.
1932	3 October	The Iraqi Kingdom (Iraq) gains independence from the United Kingdom. Baghdad is the capital.
1932	13 December	The United States of America annexes the Mangsee Island and seven of the Turtle Islands into the Commonwealth of the Philippines from the United Kingdom.
1933	23 March	Nazi Germany supersedes the Weimar Republic.
1933	5 April	Erik the Red's Land in Greenland is ceded by Norway to Denmark.
1933	13 June	The United Kingdom cedes Enderby Land and Victoria Land to Australia as the Australian Antarctic Territory.
1933	17 July	Mexico annexes the Hollinsworth banco from the United States of America.
1933	12 November	A Uyghur independence movement creates the Islamic Republic of East Turkistan. Kashgar is the capital.
1934	1 January	Italy creates Italian Libya with the merger of the colonies of Tripolitania, Cyrenaica, and Fezzan. The capital is Tripoli.
1934	6 February	The Islamic Republic of East Turkistan is taken over by the Republic of China.
1934	27 February	The United States of America annexes the Villarreales Segundo banco from Mexico.
1934	1 March	Manchukuo is renamed Manchutikuo.
1934	6 April	Spain establishes a protectorate in Ifni, in territory it had claimed since 1860.
1934	6 October	The Catalan State proclaims itself independent of the Spanish Republic. Barcelona is the capital.
1934	7 October	The Catalan State is disestablished and reabsorbed into the Spanish Republic.
1934	15 October	The Chinese Soviet Republic is annexed by the Republic of China.
1935	7 January	The Franco-Italian Agreement of 1935 de facto transfers the Aouzou Strip from French control to Italian control. The land is never officially ceded however, creating a territorial dispute that would ultimately lead to the 1978–87 Chadian–Libyan conflict. The dispute was solved by a 1994 International Court of Justice case, that stated the land belonged to Chad – the international border was what existed prior to the aforementioned 1935 agreement.
1935	21 March	Reza Shah Pahlavi changes the name of the Imperial State of Persia to the Imperial State of Iran.
1935	26 March	Jarvis Island is transferred from the United Kingdom to the United States.
1935	1 April	The Territory of the Saar Basin is taken over by Nazi Germany.
1935	3 October	Italy invades Ethiopia, beginning the Second Italo-Ethiopian War.
1935	3 November	The Hellenic Republic is renamed the Kingdom of Greece after a coup d'état and a referendum staged by Georgios Kondylis to restore the monarchy under King George II of Greece.
1935	15 November	The United States territory of the Philippines becomes the semi-independent Commonwealth of the Philippines.
1935	25 November	The East Hebei Autonomous Government is created in China after the invasion of eastern Hebei by the Empire of Japan. Tongzhou is the capital.
1936	7 March	Nazi Germany unilaterally remilitarises the Rhineland region, which was made demilitarised after the First World War.
1936	9 May	The Ethiopian Empire is taken over by Italy as Italian Ethiopia following the Italian victory in the Second Italo-Abyssinian War.
1936	1 June	The Italian colonies of Eritrea, Ethiopia, and Italian Somaliland merge to form Italian East Africa.
1936	17 July	Spanish Nationalist forces take over Spanish Morocco, starting the Spanish Civil War.
1936	23 July	The Spanish State under Nationalist rebel leader Francisco Franco proclaims itself the sole government of Spain.
1936	6 August	The United Kingdom claims Enderbury Island and McKean Island and reasserts its claim to Kanton Island.
1936	September	Ifni and Spanish Sahara are taken over by Spanish Nationalist forces.
1936	14 October	Spanish Guinea is taken over by Spanish Nationalist forces.
1936	2 December	In the French Mandate of Syria, the Jabal ad-Druze is integrated into the Syrian Republic.
1936	5 December	In the French Mandate of Syria, the Alawite State is integrated into the Syrian Republic.
1936	22 December	The Anglo-Egyptian Treaty of 1936 is ratified and all British troops are withdrawn from Egypt, except for within the Suez Canal Zone.
1936		The former colony of Curaçao and Dependencies is renamed the Territory of Curaçao following the implementation of several laws resulting from the 1922 abolition of colonies in the Kingdom of the Netherlands. Willemstad on Curaçao remains the capital.
1937	1 April	The Aden Settlement is separated from British India and changed into the Aden Colony and Protectorate. The city of Aden becomes the capital.
1937	1 April	British Burma is separated from the British Raj and becomes a separate British colony. Rangoon becomes the colony's capital.
1937	22 November	The Mongol Military Government is renamed the Mongol United Autonomous Government.
1937	5 December	The Japanese invade Shanghai, creating the Dadao Municipal Government of Shanghai.
1937	14 December	The Japanese invasion of China continues with the creation of the Provisional Government of the Republic of China.
1937	29 December	The Irish Free State changes its name to Ireland.
1938	12 January	Tristan da Cunha becomes a dependency of Saint Helena, a crown colony of the United Kingdom.
1938	14 January	Norway lays claims in Antarctica as Queen Maud Land, which lies between 20° west and 45° east.
1938	8 March	The United States claims the Canton and Enderbury Islands.
1938	13 March	Nazi Germany annexes the Federal State of Austria in the Anschluss. Vienna yields to Berlin as the capital.
1938	28 March	The Reformed Government of the Republic of China is formed after Japan invades northeastern China.
1938	29 July	The Australian Federal Capital Territory is renamed the Australian Capital Territory.
1938	2 September	The area known as Hatay gains independence from French Syria as the Hatay State.
1938	30 September	The Munich Agreement transfers the Sudetenland from Czechoslovakia to Germany and gives parts to Hungary and Poland.
1938	30 September	The Czechoslovak Republic is renamed the Second Czechoslovak Republic.
1938	3 October	Transfer by the United Kingdom to Ireland of all Treaty Ports is completed.
1939	9 January	The coastal portions of Italian Libya are directly annexed as an integral part of Italy proper.
1939	14 March	Czechoslovakia is dissolved as it is occupied by Nazi Germany. Germany establishes Slovak State as a puppet state.
1939	15 March	Carpatho-Ukraine is proclaimed but remains unrecognized, and the same day is occupied and annexed by Hungary.
1939	16 March	The Protectorate of Bohemia and Moravia is proclaimed as a German protectorate.
1939	23 March	Germany annexes the Klaipėda Region/Memel Territory from Lithuania.
1939	1 April	The Spanish State supersedes the Second Spanish Republic with the Nationalist victory in the Spanish Civil War.
1939	3 April	The United States of America annexes the Lozano banco from Mexico.
1939	6 April	The islands of Canton and Enderbury are put under the Canton and Enderbury Islands condominium of the United States and the United Kingdom.
1939	12 April	Italy annexes the Albanian Kingdom.
1939	23 June	The Kingdom of Siam changes its name to the Kingdom of Thailand.
1939	10 July	Nazi Germany changes its name to the Greater German Empire.
1939	23 July	Turkey fully annexes the Republic of Hatay.
1939	27 July	Panama annexes a corridor of land connecting both separated pieces of the United States' Panama Canal Zone.
1939	16 August	The United States of America claims Fakaofo, Funafuti, Hull Island, Niulakita, Nukufetau, and Nukulaelae.
1939	1 September	World War II begins with the invasion of Poland by Nazi Germany.
1939	1 September	Japanese-occupied Mengjiang is renamed the Mengjiang United Autonomous Government.
1939	2 September	The Free City of Danzig is annexed by Germany. Danzig yields to Berlin as the capital.
1939	14 September	The colonies of French Guiana, Guadeloupe, Inini, Martinique, and Saint Pierre and Miquelon merge into the colony of the French Antilles and Guiana.
1939	17 September	The Soviet Union invades the Republic of Poland.
1939	28 September	The government of the Republic of Poland collapses, inviting military occupation by Nazi Germany.
1939	6 October	The former territory of the Republic of Poland is partitioned between Nazi Germany and the Soviet Union, per the terms of the Molotov–Ribbentrop Pact.
1939	12 October	The General Government for the Occupied Polish Territories is created after the invasion of the Republic of Poland by Nazi Germany.
1939	1 December	The Finnish Democratic Republic is created after the invasion of Finland by the Soviet Union. Terijoki is the de facto capital.

== 1940s ==
Year	Date	Event
1940	12 March	The Winter War ends with the Moscow Peace Treaty redrawing the Soviet-Finnish border. The Karelo-Finnish Soviet Socialist Republic is formed when Soviet forces invade the Finnish Democratic Republic. Petrozavodsk is the capital.
1940	30 March	The Provisional Government of the Republic of China and the Reformed Government of the Republic of China merge to form the Reorganized National Government of China.
1940	9 April	The Kingdom of Denmark is invaded by Germany, while Greenland is granted autonomy.
1940	12 April	The Faroe Islands are put under temporary British occupation on behalf of the Government of Denmark.
1940	10 May	The Military Administration of Luxembourg and the Civil Administration Area of Luxembourg are created when German forces invade the Grand Duchy of Luxembourg. Luxembourg City is the capital.
1940	10 May	The United Kingdom' invades and occupies Iceland.
1940	14 May	The Reich Commissariat for the Occupied Dutch Territories is created when German forces invade the Kingdom of the Netherlands. Amsterdam is the capital.
1940	17 May	The Military Administration in Belgium and Northern France and the Realm Commissariat of Belgium and Northern France are created when German forces invade the Kingdom of Belgium. Brussels is the capital.
1940	6 June	Mexico annexes the Progreso and Las Flores bancos from the United States.
1940	7 June	The Realm Commissariat for the Occupied Norwegian Territories is created when Germany invades the Kingdom of Norway and its possessions. Oslo is the capital.
1940	15 June	The Soviet Union invades Lithuania.
1940	15 June	Germany annexes Alsace-Lorraine from France.
1940	17 June	The Soviet Union invades Estonia and Latvia.
1940	22 June	The French Republic is renamed the French State (Vichy France).
1940	28 June	The Soviet Union occupies the Bessarabia and northern Bukovina regions of Romania.
1940	30 June	The Bailiwick of Guernsey is occupied by Germany.
1940	1 July	The Bailiwick of Jersey is occupied by Germany.
1940	21 July	The Estonian, Latvian, and Lithuanian Soviet Socialist Republics are declared in Soviet-occupied Estonia, Latvia, and Lithuania. Most of the international community does not recognize Soviet rule in these occupied countries and some continue to recognize their diplomatic legations abroad.
1940	31 July	The General Government for the Occupied Polish Territories is renamed the General Government.
1940	2 August	The Moldavian Soviet Socialist Republic is created from a larger part of Bessarabia, a region annexed from Romania, and integrated into the Soviet Union as the 13th union republic.
1940	3 August	The Lithuanian SSR is annexed into the Soviet Union as the 14th union republic.
1940	5 August	The Latvian SSR is annexed into the Soviet Union as the 15th union republic.
1940	6 August	The Estonian SSR is annexed into the Soviet Union as the 16th union republic.
1940	19 August	British Somaliland is taken over by Italian forces and becomes a part of Italian East Africa.
1940	26 August	Chad is taken over by Free France.
1940	30 August	The Second Vienna Award transfers Northern Transylvania from Romania to Hungary.
1940	2 September	French Oceania is taken over by forces loyal to the Free French Forces (FFF).
1940	7 September	The Treaty of Craiova transfers Southern Dobruja from Romania to Bulgaria.
1940	9 September	Fascist Italy invades the Kingdom of Egypt.
1940	9 September	French India is taken over by forces loyal to the Free French Forces (FFF).
1940	22 September	New Caledonia and Dependencies are taken over by forces loyal to the Free French Forces (FFF).
1940	28 October	Fascist Italy invades Kingdom of Greece, beginning the Greco-Italian War.
1940	4 November	The international city of Tangier is taken over by the State of Spain.
1940	6 November	Chile officially declares the Chilean Antarctic Territory between longitudes 53°W and 90°W, stating that the historical basis comes from the Spanish Governorate of Terra Australis from 1539.
1940	12 November	French Gabon is taken over by forces loyal to the Free French Forces (FFF), who had invaded from the rest of French Equatorial Africa.
1941	February	Cyrenaica is taken over by the United Kingdom.
1941	18 February	The United States annexes the San Antonio and Angostura bancos from Mexico and Mexico annexes the Casner and Ruidosa bancos from the United States.
1941	26 February	Allied forces take over Italian Somaliland, which is placed under the protection of the United Kingdom.
1941	1 March	The Tsardom of Bulgaria joins the Axis powers.
1941	16 March	The British Somaliland protectorate is taken over by Allied forces.
1941	25 March	The Kingdom of Yugoslavia joins the Axis powers.
1941	27 March	Yugoslav coup d'état takes Yugoslavia out of the Axis powers.
1941	6 April	The Axis powers of Germany, Italy, and Bulgaria invade the Kingdom of Yugoslavia.
1941	9 April	Greenland and the Kingdom of Iceland are put under United States protection from the Danish government-in-exile.
1941	10 April	The Axis powers establish the Independent State of Croatia in occupied Yugoslavia.
1941	18 April	The Kingdom of Yugoslavia is fully occupied by the Axis powers, and is dissolved.
1941	23 April	Greece is fully occupied by the Axis powers, ending the Greco-Italian War.
1941	30 April	The Military Administration in Serbia is created by Germany in occupied Yugoslavia.
1941	2 May	The United States annexes the Las Ruelas banco from Mexico and Mexico annexes the Nogales banco from the United States.
1941	2 May	United Kingdom invades the Kingdom of Iraq following a pro-Axis coup d'état, beginning the Anglo-Iraqi War.
1941	5 May	The Ethiopian Empire is revived by Allied forces after being taken from Italian control, and Emperor Haile Selassie is restored to his throne.
1941	19 May	Italian Eritrea is taken over by the United Kingdom.
1941	31 May	The Anglo-Iraqi War ends with the United Kingdom in control of the Kingdom of Iraq.
1941	22 June	Germany invades the Soviet Union, beginning the Eastern Front of the Second World War.
1941	25 June	Finland invades the Soviet Union, beginning the Continuation War.
1941	July	Vichy France agrees to share French Indochina with the Empire of Japan.
1941	5 July	Beginning of the Ecuadorian–Peruvian War over border disputes between the two countries.
1941	12 July	Italy creates the protectorate of the Kingdom of Montenegro in occupied Yugoslavia.
1941	14 July	Following the Syria–Lebanon campaign, the Vichy French territories of Syria and Lebanon are taken over by Allied forces.
1941	17 July	Germany creates the Reichskommissariat Ostland in land occupied from the Soviet Union that previously made up the Baltic States.
1941	17 July	Germany creates the Reichskommissariat Ukraine in occupied Soviet Union.
1941	31 July	Fighting in Ecuadorian–Peruvian War ends.
1941	25 August	The United Kingdom and Soviet Union jointly invade Iran.
1941	31 August	After the Anglo-Soviet invasion of Iran, Iran is occupied by the United Kingdom and the Soviet Union.
1941	28 November	Italian East Africa is taken over by Allied forces.
1941	8 December	The Japanese begin the invasion of Malaya in the State of Perlis Indera Kavangan, eventually occupying it as Japanese Malaya.
1941	10 December	The Territory of Guam is taken over by Japan from the United States as Omiya Jima.
1941	11 December	The Japanese take the State of Terengganu Darul Iman from the United Kingdom and incorporate it into Japanese Malaya.
1941	14 December	Within British Malaya, the State of Kedah Darul Aman is taken over by Japan.
1941	21 December	Mexico annexes the Las Antonias and El Comedor bancos from the United States.
1941	22 December	Within British Malaya, the State of Kelantan Darul Naim is taken over by Japan.
1941	23 December	Wake Island is taken over by Japan from the United States as Otori Jima.
1941	24 December	The Japanese occupy the Kingdom of Sarawak as Sarawak.
1941	25 December	The Japanese occupy British Hong Kong as the Hong Kong Occupied Territory.
1942	2 January	The Japanese occupy the Commonwealth of the Philippines from the United States as the Philippines.
1942	6 January	The Japanese occupy the State of Brunei Darussalam from the United Kingdom.
1942	18 January	The Japanese occupy Bourneo Kita from the United Kingdom.
1942	31 January	The Japanese occupy the State of Johor Darul Ta'zim and the Federated Malay States from the United Kingdom as part of Japanese Malaya.
1942	15 February	The Japanese occupy Singapore from the United Kingdom as Syonan-to.
1942	20 February	The Japanese occupy Portuguese Timor and Dutch Timor as Timor.
1942	27 February	The United States annexes the Las Palomas banco from Mexico.
1942	8 March	The Japanese occupy the Netherlands East Indies from the Netherlands as Indonesia.
1942	23 March	The Japanese occupy the Andaman and Nicobar Islands from the United Kingdom.
1942	31 March	The Japanese occupy Christmas Island and the Straits Settlements from the United Kingdom as part of Japanese Malaya.
1942	7 June	The Japanese occupy Attu Island and Kiska from the United States as Atsuta Jima and Narukami Jima.
1942	1 August	The Japanese occupy Burma from the United Kingdom.
1942	26 August	The Japanese occupy Banaba Island and Nauru from the United Kingdom.
1942	30 August	The Civil Administration Area of Luxembourg ends and Luxembourg is annexed into Germany.
1942	9 October	The Commonwealth of Australia ceases to be a Dominion within the British Empire.
1942	23 October	Allied forces take Tripolitania from Italy, and it becomes an occupied territory of the United Kingdom.
1942	November	The British Military Administration of Libya begins when British forces invade Cyrenaica from Egypt.
1942	November	Allied forces take French West Africa from Vichy France.
1942	1 November	The Karafuto Prefecture is integrated into Mainland Japan.
1942	8 November	Allied forces take the Kingdom of Morocco from Vichy France.
1942	11 November	Italy occupies Corsica in Operation Anton.
1942	11 November	Italy invades and occupies Monaco, installing a puppet state.
1942	28 November	Allied forces take Réunion from Vichy France.
1942	14 December	Allied forces take Madagascar from Vichy France.
1942	28 December	Allied forces take French Somaliland from Vichy France.
1943	January	The French Military Territory of Fezzan-Ghadames is created when Free French Forces from Chad invade southern Italian Libya. Sabha is the capital.
1943	February	Kouang-Tchéou-Wan is conquered by Japan.
1943	12 May	Axis powers lose their last territory in Africa with the allied occupation of northern Tunisia.
1943	30 May	Attu Island is reconquered by the United States.
1943	26 June	The German Reich is officially renamed the Nazi Germany|Greater German Reich.
1943	9 July	The Allies begin the invasion of Sicily.
1943	30 July	The Shanghai French Concession and the Tientsin French Concession are taken over by Japan.
1943	1 August	Burma is given independence under Japanese occupation as the State of Burma.
1943	15 August	Kiska is reconquered by the United States after an Allied invasion.
1943	September	The French Antilles and Guiana is split into French Guiana, Guadeloupe, Inini, Martinique, and Saint Pierre and Miquelon.
1943	3 September	The Allies begin the invasion of mainland Italy.
1943	8 September	Italy surrenders to the Allied powers, and is invaded by Germany, beginning the Italian Civil War.
1943	8 September	The Albanian Kingdom becomes a protectorate of Germany from Italy.
1943	9 September	Corsica becomes an occupied territory under Germany.
1943	10 September	The Kingdom of Montenegro becomes a protectorate under Germany.
1943	11 September	The Dodecanese Islands become an occupied territory under Germany.
1943	18 September	Sardinia is taken over by the Allies.
1943	23 September	The part of Italy under German occupation is made into a separate country as the National Republican State of Italy.
1943	4 October	Corsica is liberated by the Allies.
1943	14 October	The Japanese-occupied Philippines is given independence as the Republic of the Philippines.
1943	23 October	The Andaman and Nicobar Islands are taken over by Allied forces.
1943	22 November	The State of Greater Lebanon and the Syrian Republic, which together comprise the Mandate of Syria, are given independence as the Lebanese Republic and the Syrian Republic, respectively.
1943	1 December	The National Republican State of Italy is renamed the Italian Social Republic.
1943	15 December	The United States annexes the Rock Bend, La Parida, and Los Fresnos bancos from Mexico and Mexico annexes the Orrbe banco from the United States.
1944	2 February	The Reichskommissariat Ukraine (Ukraine) is taken back by the Soviet Union from German occupation.
1944	3 February	The Marshall Islands are taken over by the United States from the Empire of Japan.
1944	12 March	Germany occupies the Kingdom of Hungary, another Axis country, in Operation Margarethe.
1944	5 June	The United States annexes the Cerros Colorados, Farias, EL Bano, Grande, Fierro, Adalberto, Martinez, Bonifacio, Pilares, Pilarito, and Cajoncitos bancos from Mexico and Mexico annexes the Bosque Bonito banco from the United States.
1944	6 June	The Allies begin the liberation of France with the Normandy landings into German occupied territory.
1944	17 June	The Kingdom of Iceland ends its personal union with the Kingdom of Denmark, becoming the Republic of Iceland.
1944	19 June	The United States purchases Water Island in the Caribbean from the East Asiatic Company, a private shipping company based in Denmark (which at the time was under German occupation).
1944	9 August	Vichy France is disestablished by ordinance of the newly created Provisional Government of the French Republic during the Liberation of France by Allied forces. The Vichy administration nominally continues to govern from the Sigmaringen enclave in Germany, but no longer controls any territory in Mainland France.
1944	10 August	Omiya Jima is taken over by the United States from the Empire of Japan and is renamed back to Guam.
1944	20 August	Clipperton Island is returned to the Provisional Government of the French Republic.
1944	3 September	The Military Administration in Belgium and North France is liberated from Nazi Germany. The Kingdom of Belgium is reformed, and the Belgian Congo is put under the Belgian government's control after having remained loyal to the government-in-exile.
1944	8 September	The Independent State of Macedonia is created in Bulgarian-controlled Macedonia.
1944	11 September	The Grand Duchy of Luxembourg is liberated from Germany.
1944	17 September	Germany invades and takes over San Marino.
1944	19 September	Finland and the Soviet Union sign the Moscow Armistice, handing control of Petsamo Province to the Soviet Union.
1944	20 September	San Marino is liberated by the Allies.
1944	11 October	The Soviet Union annexes the Tuvan People's Republic.
1944	13 October	The Kingdom of Greece returns to power after Athens is recovered.
1944	13 October	The Reichskommissariat Ostland is completely taken over by Allied forces and integrated into the Soviet Union.
1944	16 October	In the Kingdom of Hungary, the Government of National Unity is established with the support of Germany, though the boundaries of the state itself remain unchanged.
1944	20 October	The Albanian Kingdom is liberated from the Axis powers as the Democratic Government of Albania.
1944	20 October	The Military Administration in Serbia is liberated from the Axis forces, and Yugoslavia resumes control of it.
1944	3 November	The Hellenic State is completely liberated from Axis forces. The Kingdom of Greece takes over the rest of it.
1944	12 November	The East Turkestan Republic declares independence from the Republic of China.
1944	13 November	The Independent State of Macedonia is liberated from Axis forces, and Yugoslavia resumes control of it.
1944	15 December	The Kingdom of Montenegro, a puppet state of the Italian Social Republic (itself a puppet state of Germany), is taken over by Allied forces.
1944	15 December	The Reichskommissariat of Belgium and Northern France is annexed into Germany, despite now being entirely controlled by the Allies.
1944	21 December	The Weil and Las Antonias bancos are annexed by Mexico from the United States.
1944	31 December	The Republic of Poland gains independence.
1945	17 January	The Polish area of the General Government is liberated from Germany by Allied forces.
1945	8 March	The Kingdom of Hungary is liberated from Nazi Germany.
1945	11 March	The Empire of Vietnam declares independence from Japan under its occupation.
1945	16 March	The United States annexes the Candelaria, Candela, Tascate, Chinati, Mimbres, La Quemada, and Buenavista bancos from Mexico and Mexico annexes the El Comedor, Kilpatrick, Palo Blanco, Guadelupe, and Gleim bancos from the United States.
1945	18 March	The Kingdom of Cambodia declares independence from Japan under its occupation.
1945	20 March	France regains Alsace-Lorraine.
1945	27 March	The State of Burma is taken back over by Allied forces and becomes the British crown colony of Burma.
1945	3 April	The Czechoslovak Republic is liberated from Germany.
1945	3 April	The United States takes over the Ryukyu Islands and administers it as the United States Civil Administration of the Ryukyu Islands.
1945	4 April	The Slovak Republic is liberated and given to the Czechoslovak Republic.
1945	8 April	The Kingdom of Laos declares independence under Japanese occupation, while Japanese Indochina ceases to exist as a political entity.
1945	25 April	The Italian Social Republic is recovered from Germany and given to the Kingdom of Italy.
1945	27 April	The second Republic of Austria is established in occupied Austria. Vienna is the capital. Its independence is recognised by the Allies.
1945	1 May	Following the death of Adolf Hitler and the Allied victory in the Battle of Berlin, the government of Germany is moved to Flensburg and the Flensburg Government is created under Admiral Karl Doenitz.
1945	5 May	The occupation of the Kingdom of Denmark by the Flensburg Government ends. Greenland is returned to Denmark from United States protection.
1945	5 May	The Reichskommissariat Niederlande (the Netherlands) is liberated and merged with the colonies of Curaçao and Dependencies and the Surinam, which had remained loyal to the government-in-exile, to form the Kingdom of the Netherlands.
1945	7 May	The Dodecanese Islands are taken over by Allied forces and given to the Kingdom of Greece.
1945	8 May	Germany formally surrenders to Allied forces, ending World War II in Europe.
1945	8 May	The Independent State of Croatia is taken over by Allied forces and given back to Yugoslavia.
1945	9 May	Reichskommissariat Norwegen (Norway) is liberated by Allied forces and its possessions are returned (Bouvet Island, Peter I Island, and Queen Maud Land).
1945	9 May	The Channel Islands are liberated from Germany to the United Kingdom as the Bailiwick of Guernsey and the Bailiwick of Jersey.
1945	13 May	The Protectorate of Bohemia and Moravia is integrated back into Czechoslovakia.
1945	14 June	The State of Brunei is retaken by the United Kingdom and is classified as a protectorate.
1945	29 June	A treaty is signed between the Soviet Union and Czechoslovakia by which the Soviet Union annexes Subcarpathian Ruthenia.
1945	29 June	Two bancos are annexed by both the United States and Mexico from one another.
1945	11 August	The Japanese-occupied Empire of Vietnam is taken back by France.
1945	15 August	Korea gains independence from the Empire of Japan. Seoul is the capital.
1945	15 August	Manchukuo is taken over by the Soviet Union.
1945	15 August	French Indochina is recovered by France.
1945	16 August	Hong Kong is liberated from Japan by Allied forces and put under British rule.
1945	17 August	The de facto Republic of Indonesia declares independence under Japanese and Allied occupation.
1945	17 August	The Commonwealth of the Philippines takes over the Japanese-occupied independent Republic of the Philippines.
1945	18 August	The Japanese create a separate political entity for the Andaman and Nicobar Islands.
1945	22 August	The Kwantung Leased Territory is returned to the Republic of China.
1945	28 August	British Hong Kong becomes a crown colony.
1945	30 August	Bảo Đại abdicates. End of the Nguyễn dynasty in Vietnam.
1945	31 August	The United States captures Minami-Tori-shima from the Empire of Japan.
1945	September	The concessions in Shanghai, Tientsin, and Kouang-Tchéou-Wan are re-controlled by France.
1945	2 September	The Empire of Japan formally surrenders to Allied forces, ending World War II in the Pacific.
1945	2 September	The Democratic Republic of Vietnam declares its independence from the French Republic. Hanoi is the capital.
1945	2 September	The capital of the Republic of China is moved from Chungking back to Nanking.
1945	3 September	The United States occupies the Bonin Islands and Volcano Islands from Japan.
1945	4 September	The United States occupies Wake Island from Japan.
1945	8 September	The Kingdom of Thailand changes its name back to the Kingdom of Siam.
1945	8 September	The following states are freed from the Empire of Japan (which becomes occupied by Allied forces) and become their own states within British Malaya: State of Kedah Darul Aman; State of Kelantan Darul Naim; State of Perlis Indera Kayangan; State of Terengganu Darul Iman
1945	9 September	The Reorganized National Government of the Republic of China is taken over by the Republic of China.
1945	10 September	Bourneo Kita and the occupation of the British protectorate of the Kingdom of Sarawak are taken back over by the United Kingdom.
1945	11 September	In occupied Japan, Timor is split between the Portuguese East Timor and the Dutch West Timor.
1945	12 September	Malaya is given back to the United Kingdom from occupied Japan and is split into the Federated Malay States and the State of Johor Darul Ta'zim.
1945	12 September	Syonan-to is taken back over by the United Kingdom from Japan as the Straits Settlements. Singapore is the capital.
1945	13 September	Nauru is taken over by Allied forces and placed under a United Nations trusteeship administered by Australia, New Zealand, and the United Kingdom.
1945	15 September	The Soviet Union's occupation of the People's Republic of Korea ends.
1945	16 September	The British occupation of the Faroe Islands ends and is handed back to Denmark.
1945	23 September	The Kingdom of Laos, which was under Japanese occupation, is taken back by France as part of French Indochina.
1945	October	In occupied Japan, Christmas Island is given back to the United Kingdom.
1945	7 October	In occupied Japan, the Andaman and Nicobar Islands are given back to the British Raj.
1945	10 October	In occupied Japan, Banaba Island is given back over by the Gilbert and Ellice Islands under the United Kingdom.
1945	16 October	The Japanese puppet state of the Kingdom of Cambodia is taken over by France and put back under French Indochina.
1945	17 October	The Soviet Union annexes northern East Prussia.
1945	24 October	The French Mandate for Syria and Lebanon ends.
1945	25 October	Republic of China takes over Taiwan.
1945	November	The Soviet Union invades northwest Iran and creates the Azerbaijan People's Government as a puppet state.
1945	29 November	France withdraws from Guangzhouwan after agreeing on 18 August to return the leased territory to the Republic of China.
1945	29 November	The Democratic Federal Yugoslavia is renamed the Federal People's Republic of Yugoslavia.
1945	2 December	The Federal People's Republic of Yugoslavia supersedes the Kingdom of Yugoslavia.
1945	26 December	The Republic of Poland becomes independent.
1945	29 December	The Netherlands New Guinea is separated from the Dutch East Indies.
1946	4 January	The Republic of Indonesia moves its capital from Jakarta to Yogyakarta.
1946	11 January	The People's Republic of Albania supersedes the Democratic Government of Albania.
1946	22 January	The Soviet Union occupies part of northwestern Iran and forms the Republic of Mahabad as a puppet state.
1946	1 February	The Hungarian Republic supersedes the Kingdom of Hungary.
1946	28 February	The French concessions of Shanghai and Tientsin are ceded to the Republic of China.
1946	2 March	Britain begins to withdraw from Iran. Part of the Iran crisis of 1946.
1946	19 March	The Provisional Government of the French Republic elevates its colonies of Algeria and Réunion to overseas departments.
1946	19 March	The French Republic elevates its colonies of Guadeloupe and Martinique to overseas departments.
1946	19 March	The French Republic elevates its colony of Guyane (French Guiana) to an overseas department.
1946	1 April	The Straits Settlements is dissolved.; The Malayan Union is formed from the following protectorates and colonies: Federated Malay States; State of Johor Darul Ta'zim; State of Kedah Darul Aman; State of Kelantan Darul; State of Perlis Indera Kayangan; State of Terengganu Darul Iman; Settlement of Malacca; Settlement of Penang; The Settlement of Singapore becomes the Colony of Singapore, Labuan becomes a part of a colony.
1946	17 April	France withdraws all troops from Syria and Lebanon.
1946	25 May	The Hashemite Kingdom of Transjordan gains independence from a British League of Nations Mandate. Amman is the capital.
1946	2 June	The Kingdom of Italy is renamed the Italian Republic.
1946	1 July	The Kingdom of Sarawak is ceded to the United Kingdom as the Colony of Sarawak.
1946	4 July	The Republic of the Philippines gains independence from the United States. Manila is the capital.
1946	4 July	In the Soviet Union, the city of Königsberg is renamed Kaliningrad.
1946	13 July	In Montenegro (then part of Yugoslavia), the city of Podgorica is renamed Titograd.
1946	15 July	The State of North Borneo is ceded to the United Kingdom as the Colony of North Borneo. Labuan is transferred from Colony of Singapore to the Colony of North Borneo.
1946	26 July	The Spanish colonies of Ifni and Spanish Sahara merge to form Spanish West Africa.
1946	15 September	The People's Republic of Bulgaria supersedes the Tsardom of Bulgaria. Sofia is the capital.
1946	14 October	The Provisional Government of the French Republic is renamed the French Republic.
1946	14 October	The United States annexes the Culebron banco from Mexico.
1946	22 October	In the Dutch East Indies, the autonomous Federation of West Kalimantan is established.
1946	27 October	The French Republic elevates its uninhabited possession of Adélie Land to an overseas territory.
1946	27 October	The French Republic elevates its colonies of French Equatorial Africa, French West Africa, and Madagascar to overseas territories; the French colony of Comoros is separated from Madagascar; and French Somaliland is renamed the Territory of French Somaliland.
1946	27 October	The French Republic elevates its French Establishments in India to an overseas territory.
1946	27 October	The French Establishments in Oceania are renamed the French Settlements in Oceania.
1946	27 October	New Caledonia and Dependencies is renamed the Territory of New Caledonia and Dependencies.
1946	27 October	Saint Pierre and Miquelon is renamed the Territory of Saint Pierre and Miquelon.
1946	November	The Soviet-occupied area of the Azerbaijan People's Government is returned to Iran.
1946	December	Several League of Nations Mandates in Africa are transferred as United Nations Trust Territories: 16 December — British Cameroons and Cameroun (French-administered).; 13 December — British Togoland, French Togoland, and the Belgian-administered Ruanda-Urundi.; 11 December — Tanganyika Territory is renamed Tanganyika (British-administered).
1946	7 December	In the Dutch East Indies, the autonomous state of Dayak Besar is established.
1946	8 December	The League of Nations Mandate of the Territory of New Guinea is transferred as a United Nations Trust Territory, administered by Australia.
1946	10 December	In the Dutch East Indies, the autonomous Belitung Council is established.
1946	12 December	Republic of China gain possession on Taiping Island.
1946	15 December	The Soviet-occupied area of the Republic of Mahabad is returned to Iran.
1946	24 December	In the Dutch East Indies, the State of Great East is established.
1946	27 December	In the Dutch East Indies, the autonomous State of Great East is renamed the State of East Indonesia.
1947	8 January	In the Dutch East Indies, the autonomous state of the Federation of South Kalimantan is established.
1947	25 January	The New Zealand-administered League of Nations Mandate of Western Samoa is transferred as a United Nations Trust Territory.
1947	10 February	The Paris Peace Treaties are signed. These treaties allow the defeated Axis powers to resume their responsibilities as sovereign states in international affairs and to qualify for membership in the United Nations. Italy loses the colonies of Italian East Africa and Italian Libya, their concession in Tianjin, China, and recognises the independence of Albania. The Dodecanese Islands are granted to Greece, whilst Istria is granted to Yugoslavia. The Free Territory of Trieste is established. France gains small border territory from Italy. Finland is restored to its post-Winter War borders, and additionally cedes Petsamo Province to the Soviet Union. Hungary is returned to its 1938 borders, losing all territorial gains since before the First Vienna Award. In addition, it cedes the Bratislava bridgehead to Czechoslovakia. Romania is returned to its borders of 1 January 1941, compared to pre-war borders Bessarabia and northern Bukovina are ceded to the Soviet Union and Southern Dobruja is ceded to Bulgaria. The Second Vienna Award however is reversed, with northern Transylvania being returned to Romania. Bulgaria is returned to its borders just after the Treaty of Craiova in which it gained the aforementioned Southern Dobruja. They return their territories occupied from Greece and Yugoslavia.
1947	3 May	The new Constitution of Japan is adopted, dissolving the Greater Japanese Empire.
1947	12 May	In the Dutch East Indies, the Federation of West Kalimantan is renamed the Special Territory of West Kalimantan.
1947	12 July	In the Dutch East Indies, the autonomous states of Bangka Council and Riau Council are created.
1947	18 July	The South Pacific (League of Nations) Mandate, governed by Japan, is transferred to the United Nations Trust Territory of the Pacific Islands, administered by the United States.
1947	12 August	Balochistan (Kalat State) gains independence from the United Kingdom as an independent monarchy.
1947	14 August	The Dominion of Pakistan gains independence from the United Kingdom. Karachi is the capital.
1947	15 August	The Dominion of India gains independence from the United Kingdom. New Delhi is the capital.
1947	27 August	In the Dutch East Indies, the Siak Besar Territory is created.
1947	15 September	The Free Territory of Trieste is created in Central Europe.
1947	8 October	In the Dutch East Indies, the autonomous state of the Special Territory of East Sumatra is created.
1947	16 October	Philippine administration of seven of the Turtle Islands begins and United Kingdom administration ends.
1947	27 October	The princely state of Jammu and Kashmir is divided between the Dominion of India and the Dominion of Pakistan.
1947	1 November	The League of Nations Mandate of Nauru is transferred as a United Nations Trust Territory.
1947	25 November	The title Dominion of New Zealand ceases to be officially used for New Zealand.
1947	14 December	The Soviet Union completely withdraws its forces from Bulgaria, ending a three-year-long occupation.
1947	15 December	France claims the Saar as a protectorate from occupied Germany.
1947	25 December	In the Dutch East Indies, the Special Territory of East Sumatra is renamed the State of East Sumatra.
1947	26 December	Sovereignty over the Territory of Heard Island and McDonald Islands is transferred from the United Kingdom to Australia.
1947	30 December	The Romanian People's Republic supersedes the Kingdom of Romania.
1948	4 January	The Union of Burma gains independence from the United Kingdom. Burma becomes a republic outside the British Commonwealth. Yangon (British Rangoon) is the capital.
1948	14 January	In the Dutch East Indies, the autonomous state of the Territory of Banjar is created.
1948	23 January	In the Dutch East Indies, the states of Bangka Council, the Belitung Council, and the Riau Council are merged as the Bangka Belitung and Riau Federation.
1948	23 January	In the Dutch East Indies, the autonomous State of Madura is created.
1948	30 January	In the United Kingdom, the Malayan Union is renamed the Federation of Malaya.
1948	4 February	The Crown Colony of Ceylon (Sri Lanka) gains independence from the United Kingdom as the Dominion of Ceylon. Colombo remains the capital.
1948	4 February	In the Dutch East Indies, the Siak Besar Territory is renamed the Federation of East Kalimantan.
1948	26 February	In the Dutch East Indies, the State of West Java is created.
1948	27 March	Kalat State is integrated into the Pakistan. Kalat yields to Karachi as capital.
1948	1 April	The Faroe Islands becomes a self-governing dependency.
1948	18 April	Ireland is declared a republic with effect as from 18 April 1949.
1948	25 April	In the Dutch East Indies, the State of West Java is renamed the Sundanese State.
1948	14 May	The State of Israel is established upon the termination of the British Mandate for Palestine. Tel Aviv is the capital.
1948	17 July	The Republic of the Philippines moves its capital from Manila to Quezon City.
1948	15 August	The Republic of Korea is established from British/American/United Nations-occupied South Korea.
1948	30 August	In the Dutch East Indies, the State of South Sumatra is established.
1948	9 September	Korea is divided between the Democratic People's Republic of Korea (North Korea) and the Republic of Korea (South Korea). Pyongyang and Seoul are the respective capitals.
1948	12 September	The State of Hyderabad is annexed by the Dominion of India. Hyderabad yields to New Delhi as capital.
1948	20 September	The Dutch colony of Curaçao and Dependencies is renamed the Netherlands Antilles, as the dependencies gain equality in level of sovereignty.
1948	26 November	In the Dutch East Indies, the autonomous state of East Java is established.
1948	25 December	The Soviet Union completely withdraws its forces from North Korea, ending a three-year-long occupation.
1948		The Mutawakkilite Kingdom of Yemen (North Yemen) moves its capital from Sanaa to Taiz.
1949	1 January	New Zealand annexes the Tokelau Islands, which creates a dispute with the United States over its claims of Atafu, Fakaofo, and Nukunono.
1949	1 March	The Emirate of Cyrenaica is created from part of the British Military Administration of Libya. The capital is Benghazi.
1949	2 March	In the Dutch East Indies, the autonomous state of Central Java is established.
1949	10 March	As a result of the 1948 Arab–Israeli War, Israel captures half of the land allotted to an Arab state under the Partition Plan, Jordan occupies the West Bank, and the Kingdom of Egypt occupies the Gaza Strip.
1949	31 March	The Dominion of Newfoundland joins Canada as the Province of Newfoundland following the Newfoundland referendums. St. John's yields to Ottawa as the capital.
1949	3 April	The Hashemite Kingdom of Transjordan is renamed the Hashemite Kingdom of Jordan.
1949	4 April	The North Atlantic Treaty is signed, forming the legal basis for the NATO military alliance to come into effect later that year. Belgium, Canada, Denmark, France, Iceland, Italy, Luxembourg, the Netherlands, Norway, Portugal, the United Kingdom and the United States are founding members.
1949	18 April	The Republic of Ireland is declared, and leaves the British Commonwealth. King George VI ceases to be King of Ireland. Seán T. O'Kelly, the President of Ireland becomes a fully recognised head of state.
1949	22 April	The Republic of China government evacuates Nanjing the day before the capital city falls to the Communists. Canton becomes the de facto capital.
1949	11 May	The Kingdom of Siam changes its name back to the Kingdom of Thailand.
1949	23 May	The Federal Republic of Germany (West Germany) and West Berlin are established in the American, British, and French occupation zones of Germany. Bonn is declared the capital.
1949	14 June	The area of Vietnam in French Indochina becomes a separate entity under France as the State of Vietnam, though North Vietnam still claims independence.
1949	20 June	The 1948 Arab–Israeli War ends, resulting in the former territory of Mandatory Palestine being split among Israel, Jordan, and the Kingdom of Egypt.
1949	19 July	The area of Laos in French Indochina becomes a separate entity under France as the Kingdom of Laos.
1949	8 August	The Indian protectorate of the Kingdom of Bhutan declares independence.
1949	20 August	The Hungarian People's Republic supersedes the Hungarian Republic.
1949	24 August	The North Atlantic Treaty comes into effect, creating the North Atlantic Treaty Organization. Belgium, Canada, Denmark, France, Iceland, Italy, Luxembourg, the Netherlands, Norway, Portugal, the United Kingdom and the United States are founding members.
1949	9 September	The Kingdom of Tripura merges with India.
1949	26 September	The United States annexes the Don Juan Cross banco from Mexico and Mexico annexes Ringgold banco from the United States.
1949	1 October	Mao Zedong proclaims the People's Republic of China. Beijing is the capital.
1949	7 October	The German Democratic Republic (East Germany) is established in Soviet-occupied eastern Germany. East Berlin is the capital.
1949	13 October	The Republic of China government evacuates Canton. Chongqing becomes the de facto capital.
1949	6 November	The Australian-administered Territory of New Guinea and the Territory of Papua merge to form the Territory of Papua and New Guinea.
1949	8 November	The remains of French Indochina form the French-administered Kingdom of Cambodia.
1949	21 November	The British-administered protectorates of the Emirate of Cyrenaica, the occupied territory of Tripolitania, and the French-occupied territory of Fezzan merge to form a jointly administered Libya.
1949	29 November	The Republic of China government evacuates Chongqing. Chengdu becomes the de facto capital.
1949	5 December	The State of Israel declares Jerusalem its official capital. Tel Aviv continues to serve as the de facto capital, although Israeli government institutions would be gradually moved to a newly constructed government quarter in West Jerusalem over the 1950s.
1949	10 December	The Republic of China government in Chengdu evacuates Mainland China for Taiwan. Taipei becomes the de facto capital.
1949	22 December	The People's Republic of China completes the conquest of the East Turkestan Republic in Xinjiang, after Republic of China forces in the region ally with the Communists in September.
1949	27 December	The forces of the People's Republic of China enter Chengdu, ending the Southwest Campaign against the Republic of China and completing the conquest of major continental Han-inhabited territories.
1949	27 December	The Republic of Indonesia becomes a federation as the Republic of the United States of Indonesia and its independence is formally recognised by the Netherlands, comprising most of the former Dutch East Indies. The capital returns to Jakarta from Yogyakarta. The Dutch remaining possession in Western New Guinea becomes Netherlands New Guinea.
1949	29 December	The State of Israel moves its Parliament, the Knesset, from Tel Aviv to the National Institutions House in West Jerusalem. The Knesset would be moved within Jerusalem, first temporarily to the Froumine House in 1950, and then to its current, permanent building in 1966.

== 1950s ==
Year	Date	Event
1950	26 January	India adopts a republican constitution and changes its name to the Republic of India. India becomes the first republic in the Commonwealth of Nations.
1950	19 February	The People's Republic of China completes the conquest of southern Yunnan, expelling the Republic of China from all of continental China Proper.
1950	1 April	The British-occupied territory of Italian Somaliland is transferred to Italy as the Trust Territory of Somalia.
1950	7 April	The People's Republic of China completes the conquest of Xikang, defeating the last regular forces of the Republic of China in continental Mainland China.
1950	25 April	The unrecognized Republic of South Maluku declares independence from Indonesia.
1950	1 May	The People's Republic of China completes the conquest of Hainan Island from the Republic of China.
1950	7 August	The People's Republic of China completes the conquest of the Wanshan Archipelago from the Republic of China, concluding the main period of hostilities in the Chinese Civil War.
1950	17 August	The Republic of the United States of Indonesia becomes a unitary state and changes its name back to the Republic of Indonesia.
1950	5 November	Indonesia reconquers Ambon, the last stronghold of the Republic of South Maluku, reducing the separatist movement to a minor insurgency.
1950	5 December	The Kingdom of Sikkim signs a treaty to become a protectorate of India.
1950	15 December	The United States reorganizes the United States Military Government of the Ryukyu Islands as the United States Civil Administration of the Ryukyu Islands.
1951	27 April	Denmark leases Thule Air Base in Greenland to the United States in perpetuity and cedes exclusive jurisdiction over the base area.
1951	23 May	The People's Republic of China annexes the de facto independent state of Tibet after the military conquest of its Chamdo Region in October 1950.
1951	5 June	The Republic of Poland and the Soviet Union exchange territory along their common border.
1951	11 June	Due to Portuguese colonies being reorganized as overseas provinces, Portuguese East Africa is renamed Mozambique and Portuguese West Africa is renamed Angola.
1951	24 December	The United Kingdom of Libya gains independence from a United Nations trusteeship, previously having been divided into the independent Emirate of Cyrenaica, British-administered Tripolitania, and the French Military Territory of Fezzan-Ghadames. Tripoli is the capital.
1952	18 February	Greece and Turkey join the North Atlantic Treaty Organization in the alliance's first enlargement.
1952	28 April	The Allied occupation of Japan ends.
1952	22 July	The Republic of Poland changes its name to the Polish People's Republic.
1952	23 July	The European Coal and Steel Community, the earliest predecessor to the European Union, is created. Italy, France, Luxembourg, Belgium, Netherlands and West Germany are the founding members.
1952	26 July	The Argentine National Gendarmerie took control of the disputed areas between Argentina and Chile in Hondo Valley, Horquetas Valley and Lagunas del Engaño, notifying the Chilean families that within one month they had to regularize their situation to the Argentine state. This prompted a diplomatic protest from Chile as they were considered to be in the country's territory.
1952	15 September	Italian Eritrea is federated within the Ethiopian Empire.
1952		Spain incorporates the protectorate of Ifni as a region of Spanish West Africa.
1953	1 January	The First Republic of Maldives supersedes the Sultanate of Maldives.
1953	12 January	The Estonian Government in Exile is established, in parallel to Estonian diplomatic legations abroad. Both are later declared keepers of the legal continuity of the restored Republic of Estonia.
1953	15 April	The United States of Venezuela is renamed the Republic of Venezuela.
1953	13 June	The Egyptian Republic supersedes the Kingdom of Egypt.
1953	26 July	The Cuban Revolution is led by Fidel Castro to overthrow Fulgencio Batista's regime.
1953	27 July	The Korean Armistice Agreement is signed, establishing the Korean Demilitarized Zone along the border between the Democratic People's Republic of Korea (North Korea) and the Republic of Korea (South Korea).
1953	1 August	The British colony of Southern Rhodesia and the protectorates of Northern Rhodesia and Nyasaland merge to form Rhodesia and Nyasaland.
1953	22 October	The Kingdom of Laos gains independence from France. Vientiane is the capital.
1953	9 November	The Kingdom of Cambodia declares its independence from France. Phnom Penh is the capital.
1953	25 December	The United States returns the Amami Islands to Japan.
1954	7 March	The Sultanate of Maldives supersedes the First Republic of Maldives.
1954	15 April	The Geneva Accords grant independence to Vietnam, which is provisionally divided into North Vietnam and South Vietnam.
1954	20 July	France recognizes the independence of Vietnam divided between the Democratic Republic of Vietnam (North Vietnam) and the Republic of Vietnam (South Vietnam). Hanoi and Saigon are the respective capitals.
1954	27 July	The Free Dadra declares independence from Portugal, but is officially recognized only by India.
1954	2 August	The capital of Free Dadra is moved from Dadra to Silvassa.
1954	11 August	The Republic of India annexes Dadra and Nagar Haveli from Portuguese India.
1954	26 October	The Free Territory of Trieste is divided between Italy and Yugoslavia.
1954	25 November	Amidst a civil war, the Imamate of Oman declares the dissolution of the union of Muscat and Oman and applies for membership in the Arab League as the independent Kingdom of Oman. Nizwa remains the capital.
1954	15 December	The Kingdom of the Netherlands makes the Territory of Curaçao one of its three constituent countries as the Netherlands Antilles. Willemstad on Curaçao remains the capital.
1954	15 December	The Kingdom of the Netherlands makes the Territory of Surinam one of its three constituent countries as Suriname. Paramaribo remains the capital.
1954	20 December	France recognizes the independence of the Kingdom of Cambodia. Phnom Penh remains the capital.
1955	20 January	The People's Republic of China conquers the Yijiangshan Islands from the Republic of China after the Battle of Yijiangshan Islands.
1955	8–26 February	The People's Republic of China takes control of the Dachen Islands, Yushan Islands, Pishan Islands, and Nanji Islands after the Republic of China withdraws from these territories judged indefensible.
1955	11 April	The corridor of Panama inside the Panama Canal Zone, part of the United States of America, is slightly shifted by territorial exchanges due to bridges and highways.
1955	9 May	West Germany joins the North Atlantic Treaty Organization in the alliance's second enlargement.
1955	14 May	The Warsaw Pact is founded, led by the Soviet Union as their equivalent to the North Atlantic Treaty Organization for the Eastern Bloc. Albania, Bulgaria, Czechoslovakia, East Germany, Hungary, Poland, Romania and the Soviet Union are the founding members. China, North Vietnam and North Korea have observer status.
1955	15 May	The Republic of Austria regains its independence with the end of Allied occupation. Vienna is the capital.
1955	28 July	Following the withdrawal of French forces in August 1954, the People's Republic of China conquers Bạch Long Vĩ Island from the Republic of China.
1955	6 August	The French overseas territory of Adélie Land and the Malagasy dependencies of the Crozet Islands, the Kerguelen Islands, and Saint-Paul and Amsterdam merge to form the French Southern and Antarctic Lands.
1955	23 August	The border between Panama and the United States' Panama Canal Zone is redefined, resulting in several border changes. Punta Paitilla, the land held on Taboga Island, and the remaining American holdings in Colón and Panama City are ceded to Panama.
1955	18 September	Rockall is officially claimed by the United Kingdom.
1955	14 October	The one-unit scheme in Pakistan is passed merging all the provinces and princely states of the then western Pakistan, to a single province called West Pakistan.
1955	26 October	The State of Vietnam is renamed the Republic of Vietnam (South Vietnam).
1955	23 November	The United Kingdom transfers the Cocos or Keeling Island of the Colony of Singapore to Australia as the Territory of Cocos (Keeling) Islands.
1955	20 December	Cardiff is recognised as the capital of Wales. It is the country's first official capital since 1689.
1955		The Kingdom of Bhutan moves its capital from Punakha to Thimphu.
1956	1 January	The Republic of Sudan gains independence from the United Kingdom. Khartoum is the capital. Egypt relinquishes its claim to Sudan.
1956	14 January	The United States of America annexes the San Felipe banco from Mexico.
1956	2 March	The Sherifian Empire gains independence from France. Rabat is the capital.
1956	20 March	The Kingdom of Tunisia gains independence from France. Tunis is the capital.
1956	23 March	Pakistan adopts a new constitution and changes its name to the Islamic Republic of Pakistan, and remains part of the Commonwealth of Nations.
1956	7 April	Spanish Morocco becomes part of the Sherifian Empire.
1956	18 June	The Egyptian Republic declares its complete independence from the United Kingdom.
1956	23 June	Beginning of the Hungarian Revolution of 1956.
1956	16 July	The Karelo-Finnish Soviet Socialist Republic is made part of the Russian SFSR.
1956	23 October	Beginning of the main phase of the Hungarian Revolution of 1956.
1956	29 October	The Tangier International Zone, under the joint administration of France, Spain, the United Kingdom, Italy, Portugal, and Belgium, is reintegrated into the Sherifian Empire.
1956	29 October	France, Britain and Israel invade Egypt in the Suez Crisis.
1956	1 November	Hungary withdraws from the Warsaw Pact as part of the ongoing revolution.
1956	4 November	The Soviet Union invades and occupies Hungary to end the revolution. A new government is established.
1956	7 November	Fighting in the Suez Crisis ends. Israel occupies the Sinai Peninsula of Egypt.
1956	13 December	British Togoland is merged into the Gold Coast.
1957	1 January	Saar is given to West Germany as the state of Saarland.
1957	16 January	The People's Republic of China transfers Bạch Long Vĩ Island to North Vietnam.
1957	28 February	Argentina declares the Argentine Antarctic Sector between the meridians 25° W and 74° W
1957	March	Israel withdraws from Sinai, returning it to Egyptian control.
1957	6 March	Ghana gains independence from the United Kingdom. Accra is the capital.
1957	25 July	The Kingdom of Tunisia is renamed the Republic of Tunisia.
1957	14 August	The Sherifian Empire is renamed the Kingdom of Morocco.
1957	31 August	The Federation of Malaya gains independence from the United Kingdom. Kuala Lumpur is the capital. Malaya becomes the first native monarchy in the Commonwealth of Nations.
1957	23 October	Morocco invades Ifni, conquering most of the region beyond the vicinity of Sidi Ifni from Spain by December, and occupying it until Spain cedes the entire region in 1969.
1958	1 January	The United Kingdom separates Christmas Island from the Colony of Singapore to form the Colony of Christmas Island.
1958	3 January	The United Kingdom establishes the West Indies Federation as a federation of most of the British West Indies, excluding the British Virgin Islands and the Bahamas. The de jure capital is Chaguaramas on Trinidad and the de facto capital is Port of Spain on Trinidad.
1958	10 January	Ifni is separated from Spanish West Africa as Ifni Province.
1958	12 January	The Snipe incident starts between Argentina and Chile in the Beagle Channel in which the two countries disagreed about the sovereign rights over the zone and Snipe, an uninhabitable islet between Picton Island and Navarino Island and started to build lighthouses (destroying the one built by the other country).
1958	14 February	The Hashemite Kingdom of Iraq and the Hashemite Kingdom of Jordan unite to form the Arab Federation of Iraq and Jordan. Amman yields to Baghdad as the capital.
1958	22 February	The Egyptian Republic and the Syrian Arab Republic unite to form the United Arab Republic. Damascus yields to Cairo as the capital.
1958	22 February	The French-administered United Nations Trust Territory of French Togoland is renamed Togo.
1958	8 March	The United Arab States is formed as a confederation between the United Arab Republic (Egypt and Syria) and the Kingdom of Yemen.
1958	10 April	Spanish West Africa is disestablished: The province of Cape Juby is ceded to the Kingdom of Morocco.; The provinces of Río de Oro and Saguia el-Hamra become Spanish Sahara.
1958	14 May	The French Territory of the Comoros votes to move its capital from Dzaoudzi to Moroni. The actual move occurs gradually by 1966.
1958	14 July	The Republic of Iraq and the Hashemite Kingdom of Jordan are created from the dissolution of the Arab Federation of Iraq and Jordan. The Republic of Iraq is created by the 14 July Revolution in which King Faisal II was murdered. Baghdad remains the capital of Iraq. Amman is again the capital of Jordan.
1958	1 October	Sovereignty over the Colony of Christmas Island is transferred from the United Kingdom to Australia as the Territory of Christmas Island.
1958	2 October	The Republic of Guinea gains independence from France. Conakry is the capital.
1958	4 October	The French Fifth Republic succeeds the French Fourth Republic.
1958	15 October	The Malagasy Republic (Madagascar) gains autonomy within the French Community. Antananarivo is the capital.
1958	26 October	The People's Republic of China completely withdraws its forces from North Korea, ending its eight-year-long military presence in the Korean Peninsula.
1958	3 November	The Argentine Gendarmerie re-enter the Horquetas and Hondo Valley inside the disputed area between Argentina and Chile denominated as "río Encuentro-Alto Palena".
1958	15 November	The Soviet Union completely withdraws its forces from Romania, ending a 14-year-long occupation.
1958	28 November	The following French colonies join the newly created French Community: Chad; Congo; Gabon; Mauritania; Senegal; French Sudan (as Soudan)
1958	1 December	The French colony of Ubangi-Shari joins the French Community as the Central African Republic.
1958	4 December	The French colony of Dahomey joins the French Community.
1958	4 December	The French colony of Ivory Coast joins the French Community.
1958	8 December	Sovereignty over Gwadar is transferred from the Sultanate of Muscat and Oman to Pakistan.
1958	11 December	The French colony of Upper Volta joins the French Community.
1958	19 December	The French colony of Niger joins the French Community.
1959	1 January	The Cuban revolution ends with 26th of July Movement victory and new regime led by the Communist Party of Cuba.
1959	3 January	The United Suvadive Republic secedes from the Sultanate of Maldives. Hithadhoo is the capital.
1959	3 January	Alaska is admitted to the Union as the 49th State of the United States.
1959	30 January	The forces of the United Kingdom and the Sultanate of Muscat conquer the last strongholds of the Kingdom of Oman, reincorporating the Imamate into Muscat and Oman. Muscat effectively becomes the joint capital.
1959	4 April	In French Africa, the colonies of Senegal and Soudan merge to form the Mali Federation.
1959	3 June	The United Kingdom changes the name of the Colony of Singapore to the State of Singapore.
1959	30 June	Fernando Pó and Río Muni are merged to form Spanish Guinea.
1959	16 November	Hawaii is admitted to the Union as the 50th State of the United States.
1959		The Bhutanese enclaves within Tibet are taken over by the People's Republic of China.

== 1960s ==
Year	Date	Event
1960	1 January	The Republic of Cameroun gains independence from the French Republic. Yaoundé remains the capital.
1960	1 January	The British Leeward Islands are dissolved into the British colonies of Antigua, Montserrat, Saint Christopher, Nevis and Anguilla, and the British Virgin Islands.; The British Windward Islands are dissolved into the British colonies of Dominica, Grenada, Saint Lucia, and Saint Vincent.; The British Virgin Islands becomes a separate crown colony while other remains within the West Indies Federation.
1960	1 April	France detaches the Scattered Islands in the Indian Ocean from the Malagasy Republic shortly before its independence. In September the administration of the Scattered Islands is delegated to the Prefect of Réunion.
1960	21 April	The Republic of the United States of Brazil moves its capital from Rio de Janeiro to Brasília.
1960	27 April	The Togolese Republic (Togo) gains independence from the French Republic. Lomé remains the capital.
1960	14 June	South Kasai declares independence from the Republic of the Congo (Léopoldville).
1960	20 June	The Mali Federation gains independence from the French Republic. Dakar remains the capital.
1960	26 June	The Malagasy Republic (Madagascar) gains independence from the French Republic. Antananarivo remains the capital.
1960	26 June	British Somaliland gains independence from the United Kingdom temporarily as the State of Somaliland, in preparation for union with the Trust Territory of Somaliland. Hargeisa remains the capital.
1960	30 June	The Belgian Congo gains independence from the Kingdom of Belgium as the Republic of the Congo (Congo-Léopoldville). Léopoldville remains the capital.
1960	1 July	The Somali Republic is created through the merger of the intra-46th meridian east territories, the Trust Territory of Somaliland and the State of Somaliland. Mogadishu becomes the capital.
1960	1 July	Ghana changes its name to the Republic of Ghana and severs all ties to the British monarchy as a Commonwealth realm and remains part of the Commonwealth of Nations.
1960	11 July	The Czechoslovak Republic changes its name to the Czechoslovak Socialist Republic.
1960	11 July	The State of Katanga declares independence from the Republic of the Congo (Léopoldville) with no recognition.
1960	1 August	The Republic of Dahomey gains independence from the French Republic. Porto-Novo remains the capital.
1960	1 August	The capital of Pakistan is moved from Karachi to Rawalpindi.
1960	3 August	The Republic of Niger gains independence from the French Republic. Niamey remains the capital.
1960	5 August	The Republic of Upper Volta gains independence from the French Republic. Ouagadougou remains the capital.
1960	7 August	The Côte d'Ivoire gains independence from the French Republic. Abidjan remains the capital.
1960	11 August	The Republic of Chad gains independence from the French Republic. Fort Lamy remains the capital.
1960	13 August	The Central African Republic gains independence from the French Republic. Bangui remains the capital.
1960	15 August	The Republic of the Congo (Congo-Brazzaville) gains independence from the French Republic. Brazzaville remains the capital.
1960	16 August	The Republic of Cyprus gains independence from the United Kingdom. Lefkosia (Nicosia) remains the capital. The United Kingdom retains control of Akrotiri and Dhekelia.
1960	17 August	The Gabonese Republic (Gabon) gains independence from the French Republic. Libreville remains the capital.
1960	20 August	The Republic of Senegal gains independence from the French Republic. Dakar remains the capital.
1960	22 September	The Republic of Mali gains independence from the French Republic. Bamako remains the capital.
1960	1 October	The People's Republic of China is ceded 340 km^{2} of territory and Burma is ceded 220 km^{2} of territory in a boundary treaty delimiting the borders between the two countries.
1960	1 October	The Federation of Nigeria achieves independence from the United Kingdom as a Commonwealth realm. Lagos continues to serve as the capital, and Nigeria begins administering the Bakassi Peninsula, which was formerly part of British Cameroons.
1960	28 November	The Islamic Republic of Mauritania gains independence from the French Republic. Nouakchott remains the capital.
1961	14 January	India annexes Portuguese India, and Portugal maintains its claims to it.
1961	27 April	Sierra Leone gains independence from the United Kingdom. Freetown remains the capital.
1961	31 May	The Union of South Africa ceases to be a Commonwealth realm and changes its name to the Republic of South Africa. Pretoria, Cape Town and Bloemfontein remain the capitals. South Africa temporarily withdraws from the Commonwealth of Nations as a result.
1961	1 June	Northern Cameroons joins Nigeria.
1961	19 June	The State of Kuwait gains independence from the United Kingdom. Kuwait City remains the capital.
1961	23 June	The Antarctic Treaty System enters force to administer the continent of Antarctica and all lands and waters south of the 60th parallel south.
1961	28 September	In the United Arab States, Syria leaves the United Arab Republic and returns to the name of the Syrian Arab Republic.
1961	28 September	The Free Dadra and Nagar Haveli joins India, as Portugal ceases to claim it.
1961	28 September	Portugal cedes São João Baptista de Ajudá to Dahomey.
1961	28 September	Portuguese fort São João Baptista de Ajudá (now Ouidah) is annexed by Dahomey.
1961	1 October	The southern portion of the British Cameroons gains independence from the United Kingdom and unites with the Republic of Cameroun to form the Federal Republic of Cameroon. Yaoundé remains the capital.
1961	1 December	The Netherlands New Guinea is renamed West Papua.
1961	9 December	Tanganyika gains independence from the United Kingdom. Dar-es-Salaam remains the capital.
1961	19 December	The Republic of India annexes Goa, Daman and Diu from Portuguese India.
1961	28 December	The Syrian Arab Republic secedes from the United Arab Republic, leaving Egypt as the sole member of the federation. Cairo remains the capital of the UAR. Damascus is again the capital of Syria.
1961	30 December	South Kasai is taken back by Congo (Léopoldville).
1962	1 January	The Independent State of Western Samoa gains independence from New Zealand. Apia remains the capital.
1962	3 March	The United Kingdom officially gives the territory claimed in Antarctica an entity, the British Antarctic Territory, although this is suspended under the Antarctic Treaty.
1962	31 May	The West Indies Federation is dissolved and member states return to their status as parts of the British West Indies. Chaguaramas yields to London as the capital.
1962	1 July	The Kingdom of Burundi and the Republic of Rwanda gain independence from the Kingdom of Belgium. Bujumbura and Kigali are the respective capitals.
1962	3 July	The French overseas department of Algeria gains independence from the French Republic. Algiers remains the capital.
1962	6 August	The United Kingdom creates the Crown Colonies of the Cayman Islands and the Turks and Caicos Islands from Jamaica. George Town and Cockburn Town are the respective capitals.
1962	6 August	The Crown Colony of Jamaica gains independence from the United Kingdom. Kingston remains the capital.
1962	31 August	Trinidad and Tobago gains independence from the United Kingdom as a Commonwealth realm. Port of Spain remains the capital.
1962	25 September	Algeria becomes the People's Democratic Algerian Republic.
1962	26 September	The capital of the Mutawakkilite Kingdom of Yemen is moved from Taiz to Sanaa.
1962	27 September	Mutawakkilite Kingdom of Yemen (North Yemen) is overthrown by the Yemen Arab Republic. Sanaa becomes the capital.
1962	1 October	West Papua is transferred from the Netherlands to UN authority as West New Guinea.
1962	9 October	Uganda gains independence from the United Kingdom as a Commonwealth realm. Kampala remains the capital.
1962	14 November	Eritrea becomes a province of the Ethiopian Empire, losing the autonomy it had under federation.
1962	21 November	The People's Republic of China imposes a ceasefire after conquering all of Aksai Chin. India continues to claim the territory.
1962	9 December	Tanganyika is renamed the Republic of Tanganyika and severs all ties to the British monarchy as a Commonwealth realm, but remains in the Commonwealth of Nations.
1963	15 January	Katanga is taken back by Congo (Léopoldville).
1963	3 March	The People's Republic of China is ceded the Trans-Karakoram Tract by Pakistan. India continues to claim the territory.
1963	7 April	The Federal People's Republic of Yugoslavia changes its name to the Socialist Federal Republic of Yugoslavia.
1963	25 April	The Kingdom of Libya supersedes the United Kingdom of Libya.
1963	1 May	West New Guinea is provisionally transferred from United Nations Temporary Executive Authority to Indonesian administration as the province of Irian Barat, pending the fulfillment of the New York Agreement.
1963	30 June	The Kingdom of Rwenzururu declares independence from Uganda with no recognition.
1963	31 August	The State of Singapore declares de facto independence from the United Kingdom.
1963	16 September	The Federation of Malaya unites with the British colonies of Singapore, Sarawak, and British North Borneo (Sabah) to form Malaysia. Kuala Lumpur remains the capital.
1963	23 September	The United Suvadive Republic is reunited with the Sultanate of Maldives. Hithadhoo yields to Male as the capital.
1963	1 October	The Federation of Nigeria is renamed the Federal Republic of Nigeria and severs all ties to the British monarchy as a Commonwealth realm.
1963	10 December	The Sultanate of Zanzibar gains independence from the United Kingdom. Zanzibar City remains the capital.
1963	12 December	Kenya gains independence from the United Kingdom. Nairobi remains the capital.
1963	15 December	The Spanish colonies of Fernando Pó and Río Muni merge to form Spanish Guinea.
1963	31 December	The Federation of Rhodesia and Nyasaland is divided into Northern Rhodesia, Southern Rhodesia, and Nyasaland.
1964	12 January	The People's Republic of Zanzibar and Pemba is established after a revolution overthrows the Sultanate of Zanzibar.
1964	14 January	The Chamizal is split between Mexico and the United States of America.
1964	4 March	The United Nations Buffer Zone in Cyprus is established in the Republic of Cyprus between Greek Cypriot and Turkish Cypriot communities.
1964	22 April	The Romanian People's Republic gains full economic and political independence from the Soviet Union. Bucharest remains the capital.
1964	26 April	The Republic of Tanganyika and the People's Republic of Zanzibar and Pemba unite to form the United Republic of Tanganyika and Zanzibar. Zanzibar City yields to Dar-es-Salaam as the capital.
1964	6 July	Malawi gains independence from the United Kingdom. Zomba remains the capital.
1964	1 August	The Republic of the Congo (Congo-Léopoldville) changes its name to the Democratic Republic of the Congo.
1964	21 September	The Crown Colony of Malta gains independence from the United Kingdom as the State of Malta. Valletta remains the capital.
1964	24 October	Northern Rhodesia gains independence from the United Kingdom as the Republic of Zambia. Lusaka remains the capital.
1964	1 November	The United Republic of Tanganyika and Zanzibar changes its name to the United Republic of Tanzania, which becomes a member state of the Commonwealth of Nations.
1964	12 December	Kenya is renamed the Republic of Kenya and severs all ties to the British monarchy as a Commonwealth realm, but remains part of the Commonwealth of Nations.
1965	18 February	The Gambia gains independence from the United Kingdom as a Commonwealth realm. Bathurst remains the capital.
1965	8 March	The first 3,500 U.S. combat troops land in Da Nang, beginning an eight-year United States occupation of South Vietnam.
1965	8 April	The Merger Treaty is signed, establishing the European Communities between Luxembourg, Belgium, Netherlands, West Germany, France and Italy.
1965	26 July	The British Protectorate over the Sultanate of Maldives ends. The Maldives becomes independent outside the Commonwealth of Nations. Male remains the capital.
1965	4 August	The Cook Islands become a state in free association with New Zealand, sharing citizenship.
1965	9 August	The Republic of Singapore is expelled from Malaysia and becomes fully independent within the Commonwealth of Nations. Singapore remains the capital.
1965	9 August	Jordan and Saudi Arabia sign a treaty significantly revising their mutual borders and resolving the territorial dispute over Ma'an.
1965	21 August	The Romanian People's Republic changes its name to Socialist Republic of Romania.
1965	6 November	The Laguna del Desierto incident happened between four Chilean Carabineros and between 40 and 90 members of the Argentine National Gendarmerie and took place in the disputed area south of O'Higgins/San Martín Lake between Argentina and Chile, inhabited by Chilean families, occupied by the Argentine Gendarmerie after the incident.
1965	8 November	The United Kingdom creates the British Indian Ocean Territory from the Chagos Archipelago in Mauritius and the islands of Aldabra, Farquhar and Desroches from Seychelles, as Mauritius claims the Chagos Archipelago.
1965	11 November	The Cabinet of Southern Rhodesia issues its Unilateral Declaration of Independence from the United Kingdom as Rhodesia, which goes unrecognized. Rhodesia attempts to become a Commonwealth realm with Queen Elizabeth II as Queen of Rhodesia, which remained unrecognised. Salisbury remains the capital.
1966	24 May	The Federal Republic of Nigeria changes its name to the Republic of Nigeria.
1966	26 May	The Crown Colony of British Guiana gains independence from the United Kingdom as Guyana. Georgetown remains the capital.
1966	30 June	The Democratic Republic of the Congo changes the name of its capital from Léopoldville to Kinshasa.
1966	6 July	Malawi changes its name to the Republic of Malawi and severs all ties to the British monarchy as a Commonwealth realm, but remains in the Commonwealth of Nations.
1966	31 August	The Republic of Nigeria changes its name back to the Federal Republic of Nigeria.
1966	30 September	Bechuanaland gains independence from the United Kingdom as the Republic of Botswana. Gaborone remains the capital.
1966	4 October	The Crown Colony of the Territory of Basutoland gains independence from the United Kingdom as the Kingdom of Lesotho. Maseru remains the capital.
1966	12 October	Guyana discovers that Venezuela had sometime before occupied and effectively annexed Ankoko Island in the disputed Essequibo region.
1966	24 November	The Río Encuentro-Alto Palena Dispute between the Republic of Chile and the Argentine Republic is defined by arbitration by Elizabeth II.
1966	28 November	The Republic of Burundi supersedes the Kingdom of Burundi.
1966	30 November	Barbados gains independence from the United Kingdom as a Commonwealth realm. Bridgetown remains the capital.
1967	24 January	The Republic of the United States of Brazil changes its name to the Federative Republic of Brazil.
1967	30 May	The Republic of Biafra secedes from the Federal Republic of Nigeria. Enugu is the capital. Recognized by Gabon, Ivory Coast, Tanzania, and Zambia.
1967	10 June	Israel captures the Gaza Strip and the Sinai Peninsula from the United Arab Republic (Egypt), the West Bank (including East Jerusalem) from Jordan, and the Golan Heights from Syria as a result of the Six-Day War.
1967	1 July	The Merger Treaty comes into force, establishing the European Communities between Luxembourg, Belgium, Netherlands, West Germany, France and Italy.
1967	1 July	Taipei becomes a Special municipality separate from Taiwan Province, thus becoming the de jure capital of the Republic of China.
1967	5 July	French Somaliland is renamed the French Territory of the Afars and Issas.
1967	12 July	Following a referendum the day before, the Republic of Anguilla declares independence from the associated state of Saint Christopher, Nevis and Anguilla while seeking to remain a territory of the United Kingdom. The Valley becomes the capital.
1967	8 August	With the signing of the ASEAN Declaration, the Association of Southeast Asian Nations is founded as a regional grouping of five states: Indonesia, Malaysia, Philippines, Singapore, and Thailand.
1967	14 August	The capital of Pakistan is moved from Rawalpindi to Islamabad.
1967	17 August	Biafra takes over the Benin region.
1967	8 September	Uganda is renamed the Republic of Uganda, but remains in the Commonwealth of Nations.
1967	19 September	The Republic of Benin becomes a puppet state that has no recognition from the parent state (Biafra).
1967	20 September	The Republic of Benin is taken over by Nigeria.
1967	7 November	South Yemen declares its independence from the United Kingdom as the People's Republic of South Yemen. Aden is the capital.
1967	30 November	The United Kingdom transfers the Khuriya Muriya Islands to Muscat and Oman.
1968	31 January	Nauru gains independence from a United Nations trusteeship jointly administered by the Commonwealth of Australia, New Zealand, and the United Kingdom as the Republic of Nauru. Nauru becomes a special member of the Commonwealth of Nations. Yaren remains the de facto capital.
1968	12 March	Mauritius gains independence from the United Kingdom. Port Louis remains the capital.
1968	18 May	Mexico annexes the Los Indios banco from the United States of America.
1968	26 June	The Allied-occupied Bonin-Volcano Islands are given back to Japan.
1968	6 September	The Kingdom of Swaziland gains full independence from the United Kingdom. Mbabane is the capital.
1968	20-21 August	Four Warsaw Pact members - the Soviet Union, Poland, Bulgaria, and Hungary jointly invade and occupy Czechoslovakia to stop reforms by the Soviet satellite government. Romania and Albania refuse to participate; Albania leaves the pact less than a month later.
1968	13 September	Albania formally withdraws from the Warsaw Pact, having withheld support since 1961 over the Soviet-Albanian split.
1968	12 October	Spanish Guinea gains independence from Spain as the Republic of Equatorial Guinea. Malabo remains the capital.
1968	11 November	The Republic of Maldives supersedes the Sultanate of Maldives as a republic outside the Commonwealth of Nations.
1969	7 February	Following a referendum the day before, the Republic of Anguilla declares independence from the United Kingdom. The Valley remains the capital.
1969	19 March	The Republic of Anguilla is overthrown by British forces and reincorporated into the associated state of Saint Christopher, Nevis and Anguilla.
1969	10 May	The United Kingdom changes the name of the Colony of the Bahama Islands to the Commonwealth of the Bahama Islands.
1969	25 May	Following a coup, the Democratic Republic of the Sudan supersedes the Republic of the Sudan. Khartoum remains the capital.
1969	30 June	Spain transfers Ifni to Morocco.
1969	1 September	Following a coup, the Libyan Arab Republic supersedes the Kingdom of Libya. Tripoli becomes the sole capital.
1969	21 October	Following a coup, the Somali Democratic Republic supersedes the Somali Republic. Mogadishu remains the capital.
1969	19 November	The UN General Assembly formally recognizes Indonesia's annexation of West New Guinea 'in accordance' with the New York Agreement.
1969	31 December	The Republic of the Congo changes its name to the People's Republic of the Congo.

== 1970s ==
Year	Date	Event
1970	15 January	The Republic of Biafra capitulates and is reabsorbed by Nigeria.
1970	18 January	Kuwait and Saudi Arabia ratify an agreement to partition the Neutral Zone between the two.
1970	23 February	Guyana changes its name to the Co-operative Republic of Guyana and severs all ties to the British monarchy as a Commonwealth realm, but remains in the Commonwealth of Nations.
1970	2 March	Rhodesia is declared the Republic of Rhodesia, but this is declared illegal by the international community as well as by the United Kingdom. Rhodesia remains de jure a British colony.
1970	18 March	Following the deposition of Prince Norodom Sihanouk, the Kingdom of Cambodia changes its name to the State of Cambodia.
1970	24 April	Following a referendum, The Gambia changes its name to the Republic of The Gambia and severs all ties to the British monarchy as a Commonwealth realm, but remains in the Commonwealth of Nations.
1970	1 May	British Honduras begins to move its capital from Belize City to Belmopan.
1970	4 June	The Kingdom of Tonga gains full independence from the United Kingdom, withdrawing from its protectorate agreement. Tonga becomes a fully independent native monarchy in the Commonwealth of Nations.Nukuʻalofa remains the capital.
1970	27 July	Mexico annexes 15 bancos from the United States, and the United States annexes 4 bancos from Mexico, under the terms of the Banco Convention of 1905; Mexico acquires a net 507.6 hectares (1254.1 acres).
1970	9 August	The Sultanate of Muscat and Oman changes its name to the Sultanate of Oman.
1970	9 October	The State of Cambodia changes its name to the Khmer Republic.
1970	10 October	The Colony of Fiji gains independence from the United Kingdom as the Dominion of Fiji.
1970	29 October	Mexico annexes the Panales and Loma del Pinto Segundo bancos from the United States under the terms of the Banco Convention of 1905, acquiring 72 hectares (177.8 acres).
1970	30 November	The People's Republic of South Yemen changes its name to the People's Democratic Republic of Yemen.
1971	26 March	Amidst a military crackdown by Pakistani forces, East Pakistan declares independence from Pakistan as the People's Republic of Bangladesh, sparking the Liberation War. Bangladesh becomes part of the Commonwealth of Nations. Dhaka becomes the capital.
1971	19 April	Sierra Leone changes its name to the Republic of Sierra Leone and severs all ties to the British monarchy as a Commonwealth realm, but remains in the Commonwealth of Nations.
1971	14 August	The protectorate of Bahrain and Its Dependencies declares independence from the United Kingdom as the State of Bahrain; its special treaties with the UK are abrogated the next day. Manama remains the capital.
1971	1 September	The protectorate of Qatar declares independence from the United Kingdom as the State of Qatar; its special treaties with the UK are abrogated two days later. Doha remains the capital.
1971	11 September	Following a referendum, the United Arab Republic changes its name to the Arab Republic of Egypt.
1971	25 October	The People's Republic of China replaces the Republic of China in China's seat in the United Nations.
1971	27 October	The Democratic Republic of the Congo changes its name to the Republic of Zaire.
1971	29 November	Following the withdrawal of British forces, Iran conquers Greater and Lesser Tunbs from the Trucial State of Ras Al Khaimah.
1971	30 November	Following the withdrawal of British forces, Iran conquers Abu Musa from the Trucial State of Sharjah.
1971	1 December	The United Kingdom ends its protectorate over the Trucial States.
1971	2 December	The United Arab Emirates is established between six of the seven emirates of the former Trucial States: Abu Dhabi, Ajman, Dubai, Fujairah, Sharjah, and Umm Al Quwain. Abu Dhabi city becomes the capital.
1971	2 December	The Emirate of Ras Al Khaimah temporarily becomes independent, as it rejects the terms of the agreement between the other former Trucial States. Ras Al Khaimah City remains the capital.
1971	13 December	Australia changes the name of the Territory of Papua and New Guinea to Papua New Guinea.
1971	16 December	Secession of Pakistan's eastern wing; Independence of Bangladesh is secured as Pakistani forces surrender, soon global powers would immediately recognize it the new nation. Bangladesh becomes a republic in the Commonwealth of Nations.
1972	1 January	Following simultaneous referendums on 1 September 1971 in Egypt, in Libya, and in Syria, the Federation of Arab Republics is formed as a confederation working toward state unification.
1972	10 February	The Emirate of Ras Al Khaimah joins the United Arab Emirates. Ras Al Khaimah City yields to Abu Dhabi as the capital.
1972	10 February	The United Kingdom formally incorporates Rockall as part of Scotland.
1972	28 February	The Southern Sudan Autonomous Region is established in Sudan.
1972	15 May	The United States transfers the Ryukyu Islands, including the Daitō Islands, back to Japan as Okinawa Prefecture.
1972	20 May	Following a referendum, the Federal Republic of Cameroon changes its name to the United Republic of Cameroon.
1972	22 May	Ceylon changes its name to the Free, Sovereign and Independent Republic of Sri Lanka and severs all ties to the British monarchy as a Commonwealth realm, but remains in the Commonwealth of Nations.
1972	17 August	Indonesia changes the name of its capital from Djakarta to Jakarta.
1972	1 September	The United States removes its claims over the Swan Islands, ending part of its territorial dispute with Honduras.
1973	First Half	Libya invades the Aouzou Strip in northern Chad, formally annexing the region in 1975 and occupying it until 1994.
1973	1 January	Portugal reorganizes the Overseas Province of Angola as the State of Angola.
1973	1 January	Portugal reorganizes the Overseas Province of Mozambique as the State of Mozambique.
1973	1 January	Denmark, Ireland, and the United Kingdom join the European Communities.
1973	29 March	The last U.S. combat troops are flown out of Tan Son Nhut Air Base, ending the eight-year United States occupation of South Vietnam.
1973	6 April	Chad changes the name of its capital from Fort Lamy to N'Djamena.
1973	24 April	The Gambia changes the name of its capital from Bathurst to Banjul.
1973	1 June	The Kingdom of Greece changes its name to the Hellenic Republic.
1973	1 June	The United Kingdom changes the name of the Crown Colony of British Honduras to the Crown Colony of Belize.
1973	10 July	The Commonwealth of the Bahama Islands gains independence from the United Kingdom as the Commonwealth of The Bahamas. Nassau remains the capital.
1973	17 July	Following a coup, the Republic of Afghanistan supersedes the Kingdom of Afghanistan. Kabul remains the capital.
1973	24 September	PAIGC rebels declare the independence of Portuguese Guinea from Portugal as the Republic of Guinea-Bissau. Madina do Boe is the de facto capital.
1973	25 October	A ceasefire is imposed in the Yom Kippur War, with Israel occupying 1600 km^{2} of Egyptian and 500 km^{2} of Syrian territory conquered since 6 October.
1973	2 November	The UN General Assembly recognizes the independence of the Republic of Guinea-Bissau, the first sub-Saharan African state to unilaterally declare independence without the consent of its colonial power (Portugal).
1973	19 November	Uruguay relinquishes its claim to Martín García Island to Argentina.
1974	3 January	The Union of Burma changes its name to the Socialist Republic of the Union of Burma.
1974	20 January	China conquers the contested Paracel Islands after a naval battle against South Vietnam.
1974	7 February	The associated state of Grenada gains independence from the United Kingdom. St. George's remains the capital.
1974	21 February	Israel completely withdraws from Egyptian territory west of the Suez Canal occupied in the Yom Kippur War, as part of the January Separation of Forces Agreement between the two states and the UN Security Council.
1974	22 February	Pakistan recognizes the independence of Bangladesh, relinquishing its claims to the former East Pakistan.
1974	24 March	The Nation of Tanna declares independence from the Anglo–French New Hebrides Condominium.
1974	26 June	Israel completely withdraws from Syrian territory occupied in the Yom Kippur War and 25 km^{2} occupied in the Six-Day War, implementing the May 1974 agreement creating a 235 km^{2} UNDOF buffer zone.
1974	29 June	The Nation of Tanna is overthrown and reincorporated into the Anglo–French New Hebrides Condominium.
1974	16 August	Turkey imposes a ceasefire after conquering 37% of Cyprus since 20 July. UN peacekeepers on the island since 1963 are deployed along the ceasefire line to create an expanded United Nations Buffer Zone in Cyprus.
1974	21 August	Saudi Arabia and the United Arab Emirates agree on a new mutual border, though the UAE subsequently disputes the Saudi interpretation of the new boundary line.
1974	5 September	The Parliament of India passes a constitutional amendment incorporating the Kingdom of Sikkim as an "associate state".
1974	10 September	Following an agreement to end the war on 26 August, Portugal dissolves Portuguese Guinea and recognizes the independence of the Republic of Guinea-Bissau. Bissau becomes the capital.
1974	12 September	Following a Derg coup amidst popular unrest, the Provisional Military Government supersedes the Ethiopian Empire, though the monarchy is formally abolished only on 21 March 1975. Addis Ababa remains the capital.
1974	1 October	The Autonomous Turkish Cypriot Administration is established as a nominally autonomous state in the Turkish–occupied territories of Cyprus. North Nicosia becomes the de facto capital.
1974	19 October	Following a referendum, the status of Niue is upgraded to self-government in free association with New Zealand. Alofi remains the capital.
1974	13 December	The State of Malta changes its name to the Republic of Malta and severs all ties to the British monarchy as a Commonwealth realm.
1974	20 December	Following the proclamation of "Ethiopian socialism", the Derg Provisional Military Government begins using the name Provisional Military Government of Socialist Ethiopia.
1975	1 January	Malawi moves its capital from Zomba to Lilongwe.
1975	13 February	The Autonomous Turkish Cypriot Administration is reorganized as the Turkish Federated State of Cyprus, with the intention of forcing federation upon Cyprus. North Nicosia remains the capital.
1975	9 April	India invades the Kingdom of Sikkim, organizing a referendum on abolishing the monarchy five days later.
1975	17 April	Following the victory of the Khmer Rouge in the Cambodian Civil War, Kampuchea supersedes the Khmer Republic. Phnom Penh remains the capital.
1975	30 April	Following the Fall of Saigon, the Provisional Revolutionary Government of the Republic of South Vietnam supersedes the Republic of Vietnam. Saigon remains the capital.
1975	16 May	India officially annexes the Kingdom of Sikkim as the State of Sikkim. Gangtok yields to New Delhi as the capital.
1975	22 June	The United Kingdom changes the name of British Solomon Islands Protectorate to Solomon Islands.
1975	25 June	In accordance with the Lusaka Accord, the State of Mozambique gains independence from Portugal as the People's Republic of Mozambique. Lourenço Marques remains the capital.
1975	5 July	The Overseas Province of Cape Verde gains independence from Portugal as the Republic of Cape Verde. Praia remains the capital.
1975	6 July	Following a referendum in December 1974, the Territory of the Comoros unilaterally declares independence from France as the State of Comoros. Moroni remains the capital.
1975	6 July	Due to its "no" vote in the December 1974 referendum, Mayotte separates from the Comoros upon the latter's independence and remains part of France, though its exact status is undefined. Dzaoudzi becomes the capital.
1975	12 July	The Overseas Province of São Tomé and Príncipe gains independence from Portugal as the Democratic Republic of São Tomé and Príncipe. São Tomé remains the capital.
1975	1 September	Two weeks before Papua New Guinea's independence, Bougainville Island declares independence from the territory and from Australia as the Republic of North Solomons. Arawa becomes the capital.
1975	4 September	In a treaty with Egypt, Israel agrees to withdraw from western Sinai and create a United Nations Emergency Force buffer zone in the region.
1975	16 September	Papua New Guinea gains independence from Australia as the Independent State of Papua New Guinea. Port Moresby remains the capital.
1975	1 October	Following a referendum, the British Colony of Gilbert and Ellice Islands is de jure divided into the Colony of Gilbert Islands and the Colony of Tuvalu. Tarawa remains and Funafuti becomes their respective capitals.
1975	11 November	In accordance with the Alvor Agreement, the State of Angola gains independence from Portugal as the People's Republic of Angola. Luanda remains the capital.
1975	14 November	A week after Morocco organized the Green March into Spanish Sahara, Spain agrees to decolonize Western Sahara through a temporary tripartite administration with Mauritania and Morocco.
1975	25 November	Suriname gains full independence from the Kingdom of the Netherlands as the Republic of Suriname. Paramaribo remains the capital.
1975	28 November	The Fretilin party unilaterally declares the independence of Portuguese Timor as East Timor. Dili remains the capital. The UN continues to recognize Portugal as the legitimate administrative power until May 2002.
1975	30 November	The Republic of Dahomey changes its name to the People's Republic of Benin.
1975	2 December	Following the victory of the Pathet Lao in the Laotian Civil War, the Lao People's Democratic Republic supersedes the Kingdom of Laos. Vientiane remains the capital.
1975	7 December	Indonesia invades East Timor, beginning a twenty-four-year occupation.
1975	8 December	Portugal completely withdraws its forces from East Timor.
1975	11 December	Morocco occupies Laayoune, the capital of Western Sahara, beginning an occupation which continues to the present; fighting immediately breaks out with Polisario Front rebels demanding the territory's independence.
1975	22 December	Mauritania conquers La Güera and Tichla after a two-week battle against the Polisario Front, beginning a four-year occupation of the southern part of Western Sahara.
1975	26 December	Iran and Iraq complete the demarcation of their border in the Shatt al-Arab on the basis of the March treaty which resolved their dispute over the waterway.
1975	30 December	Following a referendum, the Malagasy Republic changes its name to the Democratic Republic of Madagascar.
1976	1 January	The de facto division of the British Colony of Gilbert and Ellice Islands into the Colony of Gilbert Islands and the Colony of Tuvalu occurs, with the separation of the old administration and introduction of new state symbols.
1976	5 January	Kampuchea changes its name to Democratic Kampuchea.
1976	8 January	The United States annexes the Carranza, Macum, La Oficina, Vado de Pierda, Las Viboras, and Rancho Texas bancos from Mexico under the terms of the Banco Convention of 1905, acquiring 19.9 hectares (49.2 acres).
1976	26 February	Spain completely withdraws its forces and relinquishes its status as the administrative power in Western Sahara.
1976	27 February	The Polisario Front proclaims the Sahrawi Arab Democratic Republic as an independent state Western Sahara with its capital in Laayoune. 84 UN member states recognize its independence at different times.
1976	13 March	The People's Republic of Mozambique changes the name of its capital from Lourenço Marques to Maputo.
1976	14 April	Amidst a war against the Polisario Front, Mauritania and Morocco partition Western Sahara, with Mauritania annexing the southern third as Tiris al-Gharbiyya and Morocco annexing the rest as its Southern Provinces.
1976	23 June	The United Kingdom detaches Aldabra, Desroches and the Farquhar Group from the British Indian Ocean Territory and returns the islands to the Seychelles days before the latter's independence.
1976	24 June	The Philippines moves its capital from Quezon City back to Manila; the new Metro Manila becomes the official seat of government. Baguio is no longer recognized as the summer capital.
1976	29 June	The Crown Colony of the Seychelles gains independence from the United Kingdom within the Commonwealth of Nations as the Republic of the Seychelles. Victoria remains the capital.
1976	2 July	The Democratic Republic of Vietnam and the Provisional Revolutionary Government of the Republic of South Vietnam unite to form the Socialist Republic of Vietnam. Saigon yields to Hanoi as the capital.
1976	17 July	Indonesia annexes East Timor as the province of East Timor, although much of the mountainous interior remains under the control of the Fretilin resistance movement.
1976	19 July	France incorporates the Overseas Territory of Saint Pierre and Miquelon as the Overseas Department of Saint Pierre and Miquelon.
1976	1 August	Trinidad and Tobago changes its name to the Republic of Trinidad and Tobago and severs all ties to the British monarchy as a Commonwealth realm, but remains in the Commonwealth of Nations.
1976	9 August	The Republic of the North Solomons surrenders to Papua New Guinea in an agreement promising Bougainville Island autonomy as North Solomons Province.
1976	26 October	The Bantustan Republic of Transkei is declared independent by South Africa. Mthatha becomes the capital. No other country recognizes its independence, widely seen as part of the institution of apartheid.
1976	7 November	Argentina occupies Southern Thule in the South Sandwich Islands, territory internationally recognized as part of the United Kingdom.
1976	4 December	The Central African Republic changes its name to the Central African Empire.
1976	24 December	After confirming its decision to break with the Comoros and remain part of France in two referendums held in February and April, Mayotte is reorganized as the Territorial Collectivity of Mayotte.
1976	28 December	The People's Republic of Albania changes its name to the People's Socialist Republic of Albania.
1977	11 February	Mayotte moves its capital from Dzaoudzi to Mamoudzou.
1977	1 March	The United States claims maritime borders west of the Strait of Juan de Fuca, within the Dixon Entrance, and in the Beaufort Sea that conflict with the claims of Canada.
1977	2 March	The Libyan Arab Republic changes its name to the Socialist People's Libyan Arab Jamahiriya.
1977	31 March	The United Kingdom officially turns over its military bases in Masirah Island and Salalah to Oman, fulfilling a demand of the United Nations for the UK to end its "colonial policies" in Oman.
1977	22 May	Argentina and Chile turn to the United Kingdom to arbitrate a border dispute over the territorial and maritime borders between them. The United Kingdom recognizes the islands Picton, Nueva and Lennox as Chilean territory as well as the southern half of the Beagle Channel and its islands. The northern half is awarded to Argentina, along with several small islands. The maritime projection of the border defined by the arbitration projects Chile to Antarctica. Due to this, Argentina to declares the result "not valid."
1977	26 May	Mexico and the United States complete the implementation of the Boundary Treaty of 1970, resulting in several parcels of land being swapped.
1977	27 June	Following a referendum, the French Territory of the Afars and the Issas gains independence from France as the Republic of Djibouti. Djibouti City remains the capital.
1977	13 July	Somalia invades Ethiopia, conquering most of the ethnic-Somali region of Ogaden by mid-September
1977	5 December	The Federation of Arab Republics effectively ceases to exist as Libya and Syria dissolve the Federation Presidential Council, though Egypt does not formally withdraw from the confederation until 1 October 1984.
1977	6 December	The Bantustan Republic of Bophuthatswana is declared independent by South Africa. Mmabatho becomes the capital. No other country recognizes its independence, widely seen as part of the institution of apartheid.
1978	23 March	Ethiopia reconquers more than two-thirds of Ogaden, though for several more years Somalia continues to intervene in the region directly and in support of the Western Somali Liberation Front.
1978	30 April	Following the Saur Revolution, the Democratic Republic of Afghanistan supersedes the Republic of Afghanistan. Kabul remains the capital.
1978	7 July	Solomon Islands gains independence from the United Kingdom as a Commonwealth realm. Honiara remains the capital.
1978	7 September	The Free, Sovereign and Independent Republic of Sri Lanka changes its name to the Democratic Socialist Republic of Sri Lanka.
1978	1 October	Tuvalu gains independence from the United Kingdom. Funafuti remains the capital.
1978	1 October	Following the ratification of a new constitution by referendum, the State of Comoros changes its name to the Federal Islamic Republic of the Comoros.
1978	3 November	The associated state of Dominica gains independence from the United Kingdom as the Commonwealth of Dominica. Roseau remains the capital.
1978	25 December	Vietnam invades Democratic Kampuchea, beginning an occupation of Cambodia lasting more than ten years.
1978	29 December	Following the transition to democracy and the ratification of a new constitution by referendum, the Spanish State changes its name to the Kingdom of Spain.
1979	7 January	Vietnam conquers Phnom Penh effectively overthrowing Democratic Kampuchea, though it remains the UN-recognized government of Cambodia and the Khmer Rouge continues as an insurgency until June 1998.
1979	8 January	The People's Republic of Kampuchea is established by the pro-Vietnamese Salvation Front. Phnom Penh remains the capital of Cambodia.
1979	11 February	Following the overthrow of the Pahlavi dynasty, Iran supersedes the Imperial State of Iran. Tehran remains the capital.
1979	22 February	The associated state of Saint Lucia gains independence from the United Kingdom. Castries remains the capital.
1979	1 April	Following a referendum, Iran changes its name to the Islamic Republic of Iran.
1979	1 June	Rhodesia changes its name to Zimbabwe Rhodesia, implementing an unsuccessful bid for international recognition through a settlement between the white government and moderate African nationalists.
1979	12 July	The Colony of Gilbert Islands gains independence from the United Kingdom as the Republic of Kiribati; it includes most of the Phoenix and Line Islands claimed by the United States until 1983. South Tarawa remains the capital.
1979	12 July	The United Kingdom–United States condominium of Canton and Enderbury Islands is effectively dissolved into Kiribati, as the UK cedes its claims and US forces evacuate the territory ahead of the Treaty of Tarawa.
1979	5 August	Failing to defeat the Sahrawi insurgency despite French support, Mauritania relinquishes all territorial claims in Western Sahara in a peace treaty with the Polisario Front.
1979	11 August	Morocco annexes the southern third of Western Sahara following Mauritania's withdrawal. No UN member state has formally recognized Morocco's annexation of any part of Western Sahara.
1979	13 September	The Bantustan Republic of Venda is declared independent by South Africa. Thohoyandou becomes the capital. No other country recognizes its independence, widely seen as part of the institution of apartheid.
1979	21 September	The Central African Empire is overthrown by rebel forces supported by France, and a proclamation is made restoring the Central African Republic.
1979	1 October	The United States dissolves the Panama Canal Zone, transferring its territory to Panama except for 44 US enclaves which will be returned later in stages, and joint control of the canal which continues until 31 December 1999.
1979	27 October	The associated state of Saint Vincent gains independence from the United Kingdom as Saint Vincent and the Grenadines. Kingstown remains the capital.
1979	11 December	Zimbabwe Rhodesia temporarily returns under the rule of the United Kingdom as Southern Rhodesia, implementing the Lancaster House Agreement.
1979	25 December	The Soviet Union invades Afghanistan, overthrowing its government two days later and beginning an occupation lasting more than nine years.

== 1980s ==
Year	Date	Event
1980	1 January	Tafea declares independence from the Anglo–French New Hebrides Condominium.
1980	18 April	Southern Rhodesia gains independence within the Commonwealth of Nations from the United Kingdom as the Republic of Zimbabwe. Salisbury remains the capital.
1980	26 May	Tafea is overthrown by British forces and reincorporated into the Anglo–French New Hebrides Condominium.
1980	28 May	The Republic of Vemerana declares independence from the Anglo–French New Hebrides Condominium.
1980	28 July	Peruvian Republic changes its name to the Republic of Peru.
1980	30 July	Israel passes the Jerusalem Law, annexing East Jerusalem and expanding its capital of Jerusalem to encompass the annexed area. The United Nations Security Council declares the law null and void.
1980	30 July	The New Hebrides Condominium gains independence from France and the United Kingdom as the Republic of Vanuatu. Vanuatu becomes a part of the Commonwealth of Nations. Port Vila remains the capital.
1980	28 August	The Republic of Vemerana is overthrown by the forces of Vanuatu supported by those of Papua New Guinea and the Solomon Islands.
1980	22 September	Iraq invades Iran capturing more than 15,000 km^{2} by December, much of which it occupies for almost two years.
1980	19 December	The United Kingdom divides the associated state of Saint Christopher, Nevis and Anguilla into Saint Christopher and Nevis and the Crown Colony of Anguilla. Basseterre remains and The Valley becomes their respective capitals.
1981	1 January	Greece joins the European Communities.
1981	17 September	The United States removes its claims over Roncador Bank, Serrana Bank, and Quita Sueño Bank, ending part of its territorial dispute with Colombia.
1981	21 September	The Crown Colony of Belize gains independence from the United Kingdom as a Commonwealth realm. Belmopan remains the capital.
1981	1 November	The associated state of Antigua gains independence from the United Kingdom as Antigua and Barbuda. St. John's remains the capital.
1981	4 December	The Bantustan Republic of Ciskei is declared independent by South Africa. Bisho becomes the capital. No other country recognizes its independence, widely seen as part of the institution of apartheid.
1981	14 December	Israel annexes the Golan Heights.
1982	28 January	Iraq approves a treaty of 26 December with Saudi Arabia to partition the Neutral Zone between the two. The actual division of the territory occurs thereafter, though the new border is made public only in June 1991.
1982	1 February	Senegal and The Gambia attempt to unite to form the Senegambia Confederation. Dakar becomes the confederation capital, though most government powers remain with the separate states.
1982	29 March	Canada becomes a fully sovereign state with the promulgation of the Canada Act, eliminating all remaining powers in the country of the Parliament of the United Kingdom.
1982	2 April	Argentina conquers the Falkland Islands from the United Kingdom, renaming the territory Islas Malvinas and the capital from Stanley to Puerto Argentino during a two-month-long occupation.
1982	3 April	Argentina conquers South Georgia from the United Kingdom.
1982	18 April	Zimbabwe changes the name of its capital from Salisbury to Harare.
1982	25 April	The United Kingdom reconquers South Georgia from Argentina.
1982	26 April	Israel completes the sixth and final step of withdrawal, begun on 25 May 1979, from the remaining territory it occupied in the Sinai Peninsula, fulfilling the terms of its March 1979 peace treaty with Egypt.
1982	29 April	Sri Lanka moves its capital from Colombo to Sri Jayawardenepura Kotte.
1982	30 May	Spain joins the North Atlantic Treaty Organization in the alliance's third enlargement.
1982	14 June	The United Kingdom reconquers the Falkland Islands from Argentina, ending the Falklands War.
1982	20 June	The United Kingdom reconquers Southern Thule in the South Sandwich Islands from Argentina.
1982	30 June	Iraqi forces are completely expelled from Iran amidst the ongoing Iran–Iraq War.
1982	15 August	The unrecognized Kingdom of Rwenzururu disbands and surrenders to Uganda as part of an agreement promising the region a degree of local autonomy, eventually leading to its revival as a subnational kingdom.
1983	1 January	The United Kingdom changes the title of its Crown colonies and self-governing colonies to that of British Dependent Territories.
1983	21 March	Ivory Coast moves its capital from Abidjan to Yamoussoukro.
1983	5 June	The Southern Sudan Autonomous Region is abolished in Sudan.
1983	3 September	The United States removes its claims over Atafu, Fakaofo, and Nukunono, ending part of its territorial dispute with Tokelau.
1983	8 September	The United States removes its claims over Pukapuka, Manihiki, Penrhyn, and Rakahanga, ending its territorial dispute with the Cook Islands.
1983	19 September	The associated state of Saint Christopher and Nevis gains independence from the United Kingdom as the Federation of Saint Christopher and Nevis (Saint Kitts and Nevis). Basseterre remains the capital.
1983	23 September	The United States removes its claims over Birnie, Canton, Caroline, Christmas, Enderbury, Flint, Gardner, Hull, Malden, McKean, Phoenix, Starbuck, Sydney, and Vostok Islands, ending its territorial dispute with Kiribati.
1983	23 September	The United States removes its claims over Funafuti, Niulakita, Nukufetau, and Nukulaelae, ending its territorial dispute with Tuvalu.
1983	15 November	The Turkish Federated State of Cyprus declares independence from Cyprus as the Turkish Republic of Northern Cyprus. North Nicosia remains the capital. Only Turkey, which occupies Northern Cyprus, recognizes it.
1984	1 January	The Brunei Darussalam (Nation of Brunei, the Abode of Peace) gains independence within the Commonwealth of Nations from the United Kingdom.
1984	7 January	Brunei joins ASEAN as the association's sixth member state.
1984	4 February	The United Republic of Cameroon changes its name to the Republic of Cameroon.
1984	4 August	The Republic of Upper Volta changes its name to Burkina Faso.
1984	29 November	A treaty, approved in Argentina by referendum, resolves the Beagle conflict by awarding the disputed Picton, Lennox and Nueva Islands to Chile and most of the adjacent maritime territory to Argentina. It also resolves the Question of the East mouth of the Strait of Magellan, defining its border in Punta Dungeness and Cabo del Espíritu Santo, being a Chilean water body, as well as the eastern waters as Argentine maritime territory.
1985	6 June	Israel withdraws from other territory it had captured in Lebanon since 1982 to a self-declared "security zone" of formal occupation covering 850 km^{2} of southern Lebanon.
1985	11 June	France restores autonomous government to the Overseas Department of Saint Pierre and Miquelon, reorganizing it as the Territorial Collectivity of Saint Pierre and Miquelon.
1985	3 October	The United Kingdom detaches the Falkland Islands Dependencies from the Falkland Islands as the separate territory of South Georgia and the South Sandwich Islands. King Edward Point becomes the capital.
1985	10 October	The Democratic Republic of the Sudan changes its name to the Republic of the Sudan.
1985	14 October	The Republic of Ivory Coast changes its official English name to the Republic of Côte d'Ivoire.
1986	1 January	Aruba withdraws from the Netherlands Antilles and becomes a constituent country of the Kingdom of the Netherlands. Oranjestad becomes the capital.
1986	1 January	Portugal and Spain join the European Communities.
1986	3 March	Australia becomes a fully sovereign state with the promulgation of the Australia Act, eliminating all remaining powers in the country of the Parliament of the United Kingdom.
1986	15 April	The Socialist People's Libyan Arab Jamahiriya changes its name to the Great Socialist People's Libyan Arab Jamahiriya.
1986	30 September	The United States returns almost half of its concession at Thule Air Base to the jurisdiction of Greenland and Denmark.
1986	21 October	The Republic of the Marshall Islands withdraws from the US–administered United Nations Trust Territory of the Pacific Islands and becomes independent in free association with the United States. Majuro remains the capital.
1986	3 November	The Federated States of Micronesia withdraws from the US–administered United Nations Trust Territory of the Pacific Islands and becomes independent in free association with the United States. Kolonia remains the capital.
1986	4 November	The Commonwealth of the Northern Mariana Islands withdraws from the US–administered United Nations Trust Territory of the Pacific Islands and becomes an insular area of the United States. Saipan remains the capital.
1987	1 January	New Zealand becomes a fully sovereign state with the promulgation of the Constitution Act, eliminating all remaining powers in the country of the Parliament of the United Kingdom.
1987	22 February	The Provisional Military Government of Socialist Ethiopia (Derg) changes its name to the People's Democratic Republic of Ethiopia.
1987	7 October	Following a coup, the Dominion of Fiji changes its name to the Republic of Fiji and severs all ties to the British monarchy as a Commonwealth realm. Fiji is deemed to have temporarily left the Commonwealth as a result.
1987	30 November	The Democratic Republic of Afghanistan changes its name to the Republic of Afghanistan.
1988	14 March	China conquers Johnson South Reef in the Spratly Islands from Vietnam.
1988	16 July	Iran withdraws from Iraqi Kurdistan after having been evicted from territory it occupied further south, as Iraq returns to the offensive and once more invades Iran; precipitating a ceasefire in the Iran–Iraq War on 20 August.
1988	18 September	The Socialist Republic of the Union of Burma changes its name to the Union of Burma, with the SLORC junta's suspension of the 1974 Constitution.
1988	15 November	The State of Palestine declares independence from Israel, with East Jerusalem as its capital. While its actual control over territory is limited, the declaration is made amidst a popular uprising in the Israeli-occupied territories.
1989	15 February	The Soviet Union completely withdraws its forces from Afghanistan, ending a nine-year-long occupation.
1989	1 May	The People's Republic of Kampuchea changes its name to the State of Cambodia.
1989	19 June	The Union of Burma changes its name to the Union of Myanmar. The official English name of its capital is changed from Rangoon to Yangon.
1989	26 September	Vietnam completely withdraws its forces from Cambodia, ending a more than ten-year-long occupation.
1989	30 September	The Senegambia Confederation between Senegal and The Gambia is dissolved.
1989	23 October	The Hungarian People's Republic changes its name to the Hungarian Republic.
1989	3–4 November	The Federated States of Micronesia moves its capital from Kolonia to Palikir.
1989	20 December	The United States invades Panama after a declaration of war by Panama's general assembly.
1989	28 December	Following the Romanian Revolution, the Socialist Republic of Romania changes its name to Romania.
1989	31 December	The Polish People's Republic changes its name to the Republic of Poland.

== 1990s ==
Year	Date	Event
1990	19 January	Armenian forces conquer Karki, an exclave of the Azerbaijan SSR. It remains Azerbaijani territory only de jure.
1990	31 January	The United States invasion of Panama ends after the surrender of President Manuel Noreiga several weeks earlier.
1990	1 March	The People's Republic of Benin changes its name to the Republic of Benin.
1990	8 March	The Socialist Republic of Slovenia changes its name to the Republic of Slovenia.
1990	11 March	Following democratic elections, the Lithuanian Soviet Socialist Republic declares independence from the Soviet Union as the restored Republic of Lithuania. Vilnius remains the capital.
1990	11 March	Chile moves its legislative capital from Santiago to Valparaíso. Santiago remains the administrative capital.
1990	21 March	South West Africa gains independence from South Africa as the Republic of Namibia, fulfilling the terms of the Tripartite Accord. Namibia becomes part of the Commonwealth of Nations. Windhoek remains the capital.
1990	30 March	Following grassroots elections, the Estonian SSR declares the Soviet rule in Estonia illegal from the moment of establishment and announces a transitional period to restore the independence of the Republic of Estonia from the Soviet Union.
1990	23 April	The Czechoslovak Socialist Republic changes its name to the Czech and Slovak Federative Republic.
1990	4 May	Following democratic elections, the Latvian Soviet Socialist Republic declares independence from the Soviet Union as the restored Republic of Latvia, while also announcing a transitional period to achieve independence.
1990	8 May	The Estonian Soviet Socialist Republic changes its name to the Republic of Estonia.
1990	17 May	The Republic of Bougainville declares independence from Papua New Guinea. Arawa becomes the capital.
1990	22 May	The Republic of Yemen is formed through the unification of the People's Democratic Republic of Yemen and the Yemen Arab Republic. Aden yields to Sanaa as the capital.
1990	23 June	The Moldavian Soviet Socialist Republic changes its name to the Soviet Socialist Republic of Moldova.
1990	25 July	The Republic of Fiji changes its name to the Sovereign Democratic Republic of Fiji.
1990	2 August	Iraq invades Kuwait, beginning a seven-month-long occupation.
1990	4 August	The State of Kuwait changes its name to the Republic of Kuwait as a Provisional Government is installed by Iraq.
1990	19 August	The Gagauz Republic is declared as a republic within the Soviet Union separate from the Soviet Socialist Republic of Moldova. Comrat becomes the capital. It remains a de facto independent state following the dissolution of the Soviet Union.
1990	20 August	Iraq completely withdraws its forces from the territory of Iran occupied during the last weeks of the Iran–Iraq War, returning to the internationally recognized borders established by the 1975 Algiers Agreement.
1990	23 August	The Armenian Soviet Socialist Republic secedes from the Soviet Union as the Republic of Armenia. Yerevan remains the capital.
1990	28 August	Iraq annexes the Republic of Kuwait as the Kuwait Governorate and Saddamiyat al-Mitla' District.
1990	2 September	The Pridnestrovian Moldavian Soviet Socialist Republic declares independence from the Soviet Socialist Republic of Moldova as a separate republic within the Soviet Union. Tiraspol becomes the capital.
1990	20 September	The South Ossetian Autonomous Oblast changes its name to the South Ossetian Soviet Democratic Republic and declares its independence from the Georgian SSR inside the Soviet Union. Tskhinvali becomes the capital.
1990	24 September	East Germany leaves the Warsaw Pact in preparation for German reunification, with Soviet consent.
1990	28 September	The Socialist Republic of Serbia changes its name to the Republic of Serbia.
1990	3 October	Germany is reunified through the merger of the German Democratic Republic into the Federal Republic of Germany. Bonn yields to Berlin as the capital.
1990	30 October	The Kirghiz Soviet Socialist Republic changes its name to the Socialist Republic of Kyrgyzstan.
1990	15 November	The People's Republic of Bulgaria changes its name to the Republic of Bulgaria.
1990	18 November	The Georgian Soviet Socialist Republic changes its name to the Republic of Georgia.
1990	28 November	The South Ossetian Soviet Democratic Republic changes its name to the South Ossetian Soviet Republic.
1990	30 November	The People's Republic of Mozambique changes its name to the Republic of Mozambique.
1990	15 December	The Socialist Republic of Kyrgyzstan changes its name to the Republic of Kyrgyzstan.
1990	22 December	The Socialist Republic of Croatia changes its name to the Republic of Croatia.
1991	13 January	The forces of the Soviet Union withdraw from Lithuania's cities following a failed attempt to overthrow the unrecognized Republic of Lithuania.
1991	5 February	The Azerbaijan Soviet Socialist Republic changes its name to the Republic of Azerbaijan.
1991	5 February	The Republic of Kyrgyzstan changes the name of its capital from Frunze to Bishkek.
1991	11 February	Iceland becomes the first UN member state to recognize the independence of a Republic of the Soviet Union, Lithuania, when its parliament votes that the 1940 Soviet annexation is legally void. Other states soon follow.
1991	28 February	Kuwait regains its independence, with the complete withdrawal of Iraqi forces.
1991	15 March	Germany becomes fully sovereign, as the Four Powers (France, the Soviet Union, United Kingdom, and United States) renounce their rights in the country dating from the post-war occupation in the Two Plus Four Agreement.
1991	9 April	The Republic of Georgia secedes from the Soviet Union following a referendum. Tbilisi remains the capital.
1991	29 April	The People's Socialist Republic of Albania changes its name to the Republic of Albania.
1991	1 May	The Republic of China terminates the state of rebellion and war with the People's Republic of China; the constitution is restored, with amendments, demarcates the territory between the "Free Area" and the "Mainland Area", in which the ROC government recognized the Communist control of the latter without official diplomatic relations.
1991	4 May	The Assembly of the South Ossetian Soviet Republic votes to return to the status of a South Ossetian Autonomous Oblast; the Supreme Council of Georgia had dissolved the autonomous region on 10 December.
1991	18 May	The Republic of Somaliland declares independence from Somalia. Hargeisa becomes the capital. All other countries continue to officially recognize Somaliland as part of Somalia.
1991	23 May	The Soviet Socialist Republic of Moldova changes its name to the Republic of Moldova.
1991	24 May	The State of Eritrea gains de facto independence from the People's Democratic Republic of Ethiopia following a decades-long War of Independence.
1991	7 June	The Socialist Republic of Macedonia changes its name to the Republic of Macedonia.
1991	19 June	The Soviet Union completely withdraws its forces from Hungary, ending an occupation begun in 1944.
1991	25 June	The Republic of Slovenia secedes from Yugoslavia. Ljubljana remains the capital.
1991	25 June	The Republic of Croatia secedes from Yugoslavia. Zagreb remains the capital.
1991	27 June	The Soviet Union completely withdraws its forces from Czechoslovakia, ending an occupation begun in 1968
1991	4 July	Colombia changes the name of its capital from Bogotá, Distrito Capital to Santa Fe de Bogotá with the promulgation of a new constitution.
1991	21 July	The Somali Republic supersedes the Somali Democratic Republic, as rebel factions agree to restore the Constitution of 1960. Mogadishu remains the capital, though its authority is limited amidst ongoing civil war.
1991	22 July	Following the victory of the EPRDF in the civil war, Ethiopia supersedes the People's Democratic Republic of Ethiopia. Addis Ababa remains the capital.
1991	2 August	The Socialist Republic of Montenegro changes its name to the Republic of Montenegro.
1991	20 August	In response to the Soviet coup d'état attempt, the Republic of Estonia announces the end of the transitional period and declares complete independence restored from the Soviet Union. Tallinn remains the capital.
1991	21 August	In response to the Soviet coup d'état attempt, the Republic of Latvia announces the end of the transitional period and declares complete independence restored from the Soviet Union. Riga remains the capital.
1991	24 August	The Ukrainian Soviet Socialist Republic secedes from the Soviet Union as Ukraine. Kiev (renamed Kyiv in 1995) remains the capital.
1991	25 August	The Byelorussian Soviet Socialist Republic secedes from the Soviet Union. Minsk remains the capital.
1991	27 August	The Republic of Moldova secedes from the Soviet Union. Chişinău remains the capital.
1991	30 August	The Republic of Azerbaijan secedes from the Soviet Union. Baku remains the capital.
1991	31 August	The Republic of Kyrgyzstan secedes from the Soviet Union. Bishkek remains the capital.
1991	31 August	The Uzbek Soviet Socialist Republic secedes from the Soviet Union as the Republic of Uzbekistan. Tashkent remains the capital.
1991	31 August	The Tajik Soviet Socialist Republic changes its name to the Republic of Tajikistan.
1991	1 September	The South Ossetian Autonomous Oblast changes its name to the Republic of South Ossetia and annuls the law of 4 May, reverting to the status of independence from Georgia within the Soviet Union.
1991	2 September	The Nagorno-Karabakh Autonomous Oblast and Shahumyan district councils jointly declare independence from Azerbaijan as the Nagorno-Karabakh Republic within the Soviet Union. Stepanakert becomes the capital.
1991	6 September	The first meeting of the State Council of the Soviet Union recognizes the independence of Estonia, Latvia and Lithuania.
1991	6 September	A ceasefire is imposed in the war in Western Sahara, with Morocco controlling 80% of the territory within a defensive wall and the Sahrawi Arab Democratic Republic governing the remaining Free Zone from Tifariti.
1991	8 September	The Republic of Macedonia secedes from Yugoslavia. Skopje remains the capital.
1991	9 September	The Republic of Tajikistan secedes from the Soviet Union. Dushanbe remains the capital.
1991	19 September	The Byelorussian Soviet Socialist Republic changes its name to the Republic of Belarus.
1991	23 September	Following a referendum, the Republic of Armenia reaffirms its August 1990 declaration of independence from the Soviet Union.
1991	27 October	The Turkmen Soviet Socialist Republic secedes from the Soviet Union as Turkmenistan. Ashgabat remains the capital.
1991	1 November	The Chechen Republic declares independence from the Soviet Union after elections. Grozny becomes the capital. The Russian SFSR declares the election illegal the next day.
1991	5 November	The Pridnestrovian Moldavian Soviet Socialist Republic changes its name to the Pridnestrovian Moldavian Republic (Transnistria).
1991	2 December	The Russian SFSR recognizes the independence of Ukraine the day after it is affirmed by a referendum.
1991	8 December	The Russian SFSR, the Republic of Belarus, and Ukraine form the Commonwealth of Independent States as a successor organization to the Soviet Union.
1991	10 December	The Kazakh Soviet Socialist Republic changes its name to the Republic of Kazakhstan.
1991	12 December	Nigeria moves its capital from Lagos to Abuja.
1991	12 December	The Russian SFSR declares independence from the Soviet Union as part of the Belovezha Accords. Moscow remains the capital.
1991	16 December	The Republic of Kazakhstan secedes from the Soviet Union. Alma-Ata remains the capital until 1997.
1991	19 December	The Serbian Autonomous Oblast of Krajina declares its independence from Croatia and loyalty to Yugoslavia as the Republic of Serbian Krajina. Knin becomes the capital.
1991	21 December	The Republic of South Ossetia declares independence from the Soviet Union. Tskhinvali remains the capital. Georgia continues to claim South Ossetia as part of its own territory.
1991	25 December	The Russian Federation supersedes both the Soviet Union and the Russian Soviet Federative Socialist Republic. Moscow remains the capital.
1991	26 December	The Soviet Union is formally dissolved at the final meeting of the Soviet of the Republics of the Supreme Soviet.
1992	6 January	The Nagorno-Karabakh Republic declares its complete independence following a referendum. Azerbaijan, which abolished the Nagorno-Karabakh Autonomous Oblast on 26 November, continues to claim its territory in full.
1992	6 January	The Iraqi Republic changes its name to the Republic of Iraq.
1992	12 February	The Mongolian People's Republic changes its name to Mongolia upon the promulgation of a new constitution.
1992	26 February	The Serbian Autonomous Oblast of Eastern Slavonia, Baranja and Western Syrmia and the Serbian Autonomous Oblast of Western Slavonia join the Republic of Serbian Krajina.
1992	3 March	Following an independence referendum, the Socialist Republic of Bosnia and Herzegovina secedes from the Socialist Federal Republic of Yugoslavia. Sarajevo remains the capital.
1992	12 March	Mauritius changes its name to the Republic of Mauritius and severs all ties to the British monarchy as a Commonwealth realm, but remains part of the Commonwealth of Nations.
1992	12 March	The Chechen Republic changes its name to the Chechen Republic of Ichkeria upon the promulgation of a new constitution.
1992	15 March	The State of Cambodia cedes all government powers to the United Nations Transitional Authority in Cambodia tasked with organizing constituent assembly elections, in fulfillment of the 1991 Paris Peace Agreements.
1992	15 March	The People's Republic of the Congo changes its name to the Republic of the Congo following the promulgation of a new constitution by referendum.
1992	7 April	The Serbian Republic of Bosnia and Herzegovina declares independence from the Socialist Republic of Bosnia and Herzegovina. Pale becomes the capital.
1992	8 April	The Socialist Republic of Bosnia and Herzegovina changes its name to the Republic of Bosnia and Herzegovina.
1992	24 April	An accord between the Mujahideen and Afghan Army factions ends the civil war and creates the Islamic State of Afghanistan, superseding the Republic of Afghanistan. The new state immediately plunges into a new civil war.
1992	27 April	The Federal Republic of Yugoslavia supersedes the Socialist Federal Republic of Yugoslavia. Belgrade remains the capital.
1992	27 April	Armenia conquers Barxudarlı and Sofulu, two exclaves of Azerbaijan. They remain Azerbaijani territory only de jure.
1992	15 May	The Collective Security Treaty is signed by six Post-Soviet states - Russia, Armenia, Kazakhstan, Kyrgyzstan, Tajikistan, and Uzbekistan.
1992	8 June	Armenia conquers Yukhari Askipara, an exclave of Azerbaijan. It remains Azerbaijani territory only de jure.
1992	24 June	A ceasefire is imposed in the war between the unrecognized Republic of South Ossetia and Georgia, with Georgia losing control of over 60% of the former South Ossetian Autonomous Oblast which it continues to claim in full.
1992	21 July	A ceasefire is imposed in the war between the unrecognized Transnistria and Moldova, with Moldova losing control of Bender and most of the left bank of the Dniester both of which it continues to claim in full.
1992	23 July	The Abkhaz faction of the Abkhazia Supreme Soviet effectively declares independence from Georgia by reinstating the 1925 constitution, precipitating a Georgian military response and the outbreak of war.
1992	8 August	Azerbaijan conquers Artsvashen, an exclave of Armenia. It remains Armenian territory only de jure.
1992	12 August	The Serbian Republic of Bosnia and Herzegovina changes its name to Republika Srpska.
1992	27 August	The People's Republic of Angola changes its name to the Republic of Angola with the enactment of constitutional revisions.
1992	15 September	Russia completely withdraws its forces from Mongolia, ending its military presence in the country since 1967.
1992	18 September	The Democratic Republic of Madagascar changes its name to the Republic of Madagascar upon the promulgation of a new constitution.
1992	22 September	The Republic of Kosova declares independence from Yugoslavia, though it only ever exercises partial control over most of the territory it claims and receives no international recognition. Pristina is the declared capital.
1992	1 October	Oman and Yemen resolve their border dispute, in particular over the Khuriya Muriya Islands which are confirmed as part of the territory of Oman.
1993		Azerbaijan, Belarus, and Georgia join the Collective Security Treaty.
1993	1 January	The Czech Republic and the Slovak Republic gain full independence with the dissolution of the Czech and Slovak Federative Republic. Prague and Bratislava remain the respective capitals.
1993	28 January	Kazakhstan changes the name of its capital from Alma-Ata to Almaty.
1993	13 February	Papua New Guinea reconquers Arawa, the capital of the Republic of Bougainville. The Bougainville Revolutionary Army wages an insurgency until the 1997–98 agreements leading to a 2019 independence referendum.
1993	8 April	The Republic of Macedonia becomes a member state of the United Nations as "the former Yugoslav Republic of Macedonia (FYROM)" due to Greece's objection to its official name.
1993	5 May	The Republic of Kyrgyzstan changes its name to the Kyrgyz Republic.
1993	24 May	The independence of Eritrea is internationally recognized following a referendum. Asmara remains the capital.
1993	23 June	The Republic of the Seychelles changes its name to the Republic of Seychelles.
1993	28 August	The Croatian Community of Herzeg-Bosnia declares itself the Croatian Republic of Herzeg-Bosnia with the intention of forcing the Owen–Stoltenberg plan upon Bosnia and Herzegovina. Mostar becomes the capital.
1993	18 September	Russia completely withdraws its forces from Poland, ending its military presence in the country since World War II.
1993	24 September	With the promulgation of a new constitution by the Constituent Assembly elected in May, the United Nations Transitional Authority in Cambodia cedes its authority to the restored Kingdom of Cambodia.
1993	27 September	The forces of Russia and the unrecognized Republic of Abkhazia conquer the Abkhazian capital of Sukhumi from Georgia, which continues to claim the entire territory of the Autonomous Republic of Abkhazia.
1993	27 September	The secessionist Autonomous Province of Western Bosnia is established with the support of Serbian and Croatian forces believed to be intent on the partition of Bosnia and Herzegovina. Velika Kladuša is the capital.
1993	1 November	The European Union is established between the twelve members of the European Communities: Belgium, Denmark, France, Germany, Greece, Ireland, Italy, Luxembourg, Netherlands, Portugal, Spain, and the United Kingdom.
1994	1 March	South Africa transfers Walvis Bay and the Penguin Islands to Namibia.
1994	28 March	Kazakhstan leases Baikonur Cosmodrome to Russia for twenty years, with automatic extension absent objections by either party.
1994	30 March	In a ceasefire agreement, the government-controlled territories of the Republic of Bosnia and Herzegovina and the Croatian Republic of Herzeg-Bosnia combine to form the Federation of Bosnia and Herzegovina.
1994	2 April	The Collective Security Treaty takes effect, creating the Collective Security Treaty Organization military alliance.
1994	27 April	The nominally independent republics of Bophuthatswana, Ciskei, Transkei and Venda are reincorporated back into South Africa.
1994	4 May	An agreement between Israel and the Palestine Liberation Organization, implementing the Oslo I Accord, creates the Palestinian National Authority.
1994	10 May	Libya completely withdraws its forces from the Aouzou Strip in northern Chad after a 21-year occupation, implementing a 3 February ICJ verdict which upheld Chad's sovereignty over the territory.
1994	12 May	A ceasefire is imposed in the First Nagorno-Karabakh War with the forces of the unrecognized Nagorno-Karabakh Republic, supported by Armenia, occupying more than 13% of the internationally recognized territory of Azerbaijan.
1994	21 May	The Democratic Republic of Yemen secedes from Yemen. Aden is the capital.
1994	7 July	Yemeni government forces reconquer the Democratic Republic of Yemen.
1994	31 August	Russia completely withdraws its forces from eastern Germany, ending an occupation begun in 1945.
1994	1 October	The Republic of Palau gains full independence but enters into free association with the United States. Koror remains the capital. The US-administered United Nations Trust Territory of the Pacific Islands is terminated.
1994	21 October	Argentina is awarded almost all of Laguna del Desierto surrounding territory, also claimed by Chile, following international arbitration.
1994	3 November	The Taliban conquers Kandahar, the first city to fall under the control of the militant group in Afghanistan.
1994	10 November	Iraq recognizes the independence and territorial integrity of Kuwait following a new war scare on their borders.
1995	1 January	Three more states join the European Union: Austria, Finland, and Sweden.
1995	1 January	The International Date Line is moved around Kiribati.
1995	14 January	The self-proclaimed Gagauz Republic is reintegrated into Moldova as the Autonomous Territorial Unit of Gagauzia.
1995	3 May	Croatian forces reconquer the Western Slavonia region of Serbian Krajina.
1995	1 July	Oman and Saudi Arabia finalize the demarcation of their previously undefined border.
1995	26 July	The Autonomous Province of Western Bosnia changes its name to the Republic of Western Bosnia.
1995	28 July	Vietnam joins ASEAN as the association's seventh member state.
1995	7 August	Croatian and Bosnian forces reconquer most of Serbian Krajina.
1995	7 August	The Republic of Western Bosnia is conquered by the forces of Bosnia and Herzegovina supported by Croatia.
1995	21 August	Ethiopia changes its name to the Federal Democratic Republic of Ethiopia with the promulgation of a new constitution.
1995	24 August	The Republic of Georgia changes its name to Georgia.
1995	28 September	The Oslo II Accord begins the transfer of land to the Palestinian Authority. All of the Gaza Strip and 18% of the West Bank is eventually transferred to full Palestinian control, and 22% to joint Israeli-Palestinian control.
1995	14 October	Ukraine officially changes the English name of its capital from Kiev to Kyiv.
1995	12 November	Croatia and the remaining portion of Serbian Krajina in Eastern Slavonia, Baranja and Western Syrmia reach an agreement to reincorporate the region into Croatia through a transitional United Nations protectorate.
1995	14 December	The Federation of Bosnia and Herzegovina and Republika Srpska unite to form Bosnia and Herzegovina, superseding the Republic of Bosnia and Herzegovina. Sarajevo remains the capital.
1996	15 January	The United Nations Transitional Administration for Eastern Slavonia, Baranja and Western Sirmium is established in the remaining territory of the former Serbian Krajina in order to reintegrate the region into Croatia.
1996	February	Tanzania moves its capital from Dar es Salaam to Dodoma.
1996	27 September	The Islamic Emirate of Afghanistan is established following the Taliban's conquest of Kabul, which becomes the state capital.
1996	27 September	The Islamic State of Afghanistan moves its de facto capital to Mazar-i-Sharif following the evacuation of Kabul.
1997	23 January	The Chechen Republic of Ichkeria changes the name of its capital from Grozny to Dzhokhar-Ghala.
1997	17 May	The Republic of Zaire changes its name back to the Democratic Republic of the Congo.
1997	25 May	The Islamic State of Afghanistan moves its capital from Mazar-i-Sharif to Taloqan, as Mazar-i-Sharif becomes a battlefield in the war against the Taliban.
1997	28 May	Ukraine formally agrees to lease naval facilities in Sevastopol to Russia for twenty years, until 2017.
1997	1 July	Sovereignty over Hong Kong is transferred to China from the United Kingdom. Hong Kong becomes a special administrative region.
1997	4 July	The Independent State of Western Samoa changes its name to the Independent State of Samoa.
1997	23 July	Laos and Myanmar join ASEAN as the association's eighth and ninth member states.
1997	27 July	The Sovereign Democratic Republic of Fiji changes its name to the Republic of the Fiji Islands upon the promulgation of a new constitution. Fiji returns to its membership of the Commonwealth of Nations as a result.
1997	3 August	The State of Anjouan declares independence from the Comoros. Mutsamudu becomes the capital.
1997	11 August	The Democratic Republic of Mohéli declares independence from the Comoros. Fomboni becomes the capital.
1997	10 December	Kazakhstan moves its capital from Almaty to Aqmola.
1998	15 January	The United Nations Transitional Administration for Eastern Slavonia, Baranja and Western Sirmium concludes its operations and transfers full administrative authority over the region to Croatia.
1998	6 May	Kazakhstan changes the name of its capital from Aqmola to Astana.
1998	(Unknown)	Comoros reabsorbs the de facto independent Democratic Republic of Mohéli. Fomboni yields to Moroni as the capital.
1998	4 July	China is allocated 407 km^{2} and Kazakhstan is allocated 537 km^{2} of disputed territory in a treaty delimiting the border between the two countries.
1998	1 August	The Puntland State of Somalia declares "temporary" independence from Somalia. Garowe becomes the capital.
1998	16 December	Argentina and Chile redraw part of the border in the Southern Patagonian Ice Field, and establish a pending of definition area between Mount Fitz Roy and Cerro Murallón.
1999	5 March	Self-governing Brčko District in Bosnia and Herzegovina is established.
1999	12 March	The Czech Republic, Hungary, and Poland join the North Atlantic Treaty Organization in the alliance's fourth enlargement.
1999	19 March	France elevates the Overseas Territory of New Caledonia to the sui generis collectivity of New Caledonia.
1999	2 April	Azerbaijan, Georgia, and Uzbekistan leave the Collective Security Treaty Organization. The remaining six members renew the treaty for another 5 years.
1999	30 April	Cambodia joins ASEAN as the association's tenth member state.
1999	10 June	The United Nations Interim Administration Mission in Kosovo is formed in the Autonomous Province of Kosovo and Metohija of Yugoslavia.
1999	20 June	The last forces of Yugoslavia withdraw from Kosovo.
1999	23 June	Belgium and The Netherlands make a small change to the border at the Ghent–Terneuzen Canal.
1999	25 October	Indonesia relinquishes control over the disputed region of East Timor to the United Nations Transitional Administration in East Timor.
1999	20 December	The Republic of Venezuela changes its name to the Bolivarian Republic of Venezuela.
1999	20 December	Sovereignty over Macau is transferred to China from Portugal. Macau becomes a special administrative region.
1999	30 December	China and Vietnam sign a treaty resolving their border dispute, with China acquiring 114 km^{2} and Vietnam acquiring 113 km^{2} of disputed territory.
1999	31 December	The United States transfers the operation of the Panama Canal and full sovereignty in the former Panama Canal Zone to Panama.

== See also ==
- Timeline of national independence
- Geopolitics – Study of geography's effects on politics
- List of administrative division name changes
- List of city name changes
- List of national border changes (1914–present)
- Lists of political entities by century
- Sovereign state – State having the highest authority over a territory
  - List of former sovereign states
  - List of sovereign states
  - List of sovereign states by date of formation
  - List of sovereign states and dependent territories by continent
- Political history of the world
- Timeline of the Russian invasion of Ukraine

== Bibliography ==
- Panton, Kenneth J. (2015). Historical Dictionary of the British Empire. London: Rowman & Littlefield. ISBN 978-0-8108-7524-1. Archived from the original on 8 April 2016.
