= Ojinaga Cut =

The Ojinaga Cut is a tract of land between Ojinaga, Chihuahua, and Presidio, Texas, resolving an international border dispute between the United States and Mexico when the Rio Grande (Río Bravo del Norte) changed course.

The situation was similar to the better known Chamizal dispute between El Paso, Texas, and Ciudad Juárez, Chihuahua. The Presidio–Ojinaga conflict was resolved by the Boundary Treaty of 1970. The treaty restored the Rio Grande as the international border in areas where movement of the river had caused ambiguity.

The U.S. ceded 1,606.19 acres (6.5000 km^{2}) upstream from Presidio–Ojinaga, while Mexico ceded 252 acres (1.02 km^{2}) downstream. Two channels were dug by engineers, measuring 8.3 miles (13.4 km) in length altogether, placing U.S. territory north of the Rio Grande and territory belonging to Mexico to the south. This tract became known as the Ojinaga Cut.

== See also ==
- U.S.-Mexico border
- Rio Grande border disputes
