= Rio Rico =

Rio Rico may refer to:

- Rio Rico, Arizona, a census-designated community in Santa Cruz County, Arizona, United States
- Río Rico, Tamaulipas, a town in Mexico on territory that was part of the United States prior to a border adjustment in the 1970s
