= Rio Grande border disputes =

Border dispute resulting from the shifting course of the Rio Grande

The Rio Grande (Río Bravo del Norte) has changed course several times in recorded history, leading to a number of border disputes and uncertainties, both international (involving Mexico and the United States) and between individual U.S. states:

- The Country Club Dispute was a dispute between Texas and New Mexico. The U.S. Supreme Court resolved this dispute in 1927.
- The Chamizal dispute was a border conflict over a parcel of land between El Paso, Texas, and Ciudad Juárez, Chihuahua. The dispute was resolved by Chamizal settlement in 1963.
- The Ojinaga Cut was a disputed parcel of land between Presidio, Texas, and Ojinaga, Chihuahua. The dispute was resolved by the Boundary Treaty of 1970.
- The Horcón Tract was a parcel of land surrounded by an oxbow bend of the Rio Grande, including the village of Rio Rico, Texas, that inadvertently defaulted to Mexican administration with the passage of time after an irrigation company in 1906 dug an unapproved cut across the oxbow to change the course of the river. The issue, which was not technically a dispute as both sides were in agreement about its legal status upon its discovery, was resolved by the 1970 treaty which ceded the land to Mexico, but the official handover did not take place until 1977.

Numerous border treaties are jointly administered by the International Boundary and Water Commission, which was established in 1889 to maintain the border, allocate river waters between the two nations, and provide for flood control and water sanitation. Once viewed as a model of international cooperation, in recent decades the IBWC has been heavily criticized as an institutional anachronism, by-passed by modern social, environmental and political issues. In particular, jurisdictional issues regarding water rights in the Rio Grande Valley have caused tension between farmers in the border region and sparked a "water war," according to Mexican political scientist Armand Peschard-Sverdrup.

== See also ==
- Banco Convention of 1905
- Bibliography of the Texas Revolution, Republic, and Annexation
