= Chamizal dispute =

1852–1963 U.S.–Mexico border conflict

Coordinates: 31°45′30″N 106°27′30″W

Map of the Chamizal settlement of 1963

The Chamizal dispute was an international land and boundary conflict over contested land (estimates range from 600 to 1,600 acres [240–650 ha; 2.4–6.5 km^{2}]) along the Mexico–United States border between El Paso, Texas, and Ciudad Juárez, Chihuahua. The conflict was caused by multiple meandering, southward shifts in the Rio Grande, which delineates the U.S.-Mexico boundary in this region. When the International Boundary Commission (IBC) first began investigating the dispute in 1895, it discovered that an 1852 survey of the international boundary/Río Grande (in Spanish: Río Bravo del Norte) through El Paso and Cd. Juárez was significantly different from the river's 1895 course.

After much investigation, the IBC decided that the Chamizal Dispute began in 1864. That year the Río Grande made a dramatic, southward shift after a remarkable flood in the river. This shift subsequently placed Mexican territory known at that time as Paso del Norte's "Partido Chamizal" or the "Chamizal District" north of the river/boundary—and seemingly into U.S. jurisdiction. As the river's southward meanderings continued, and as more Anglo American settlers began arriving to this region in the late 1880s and settling Partido Chamizal as part of the American town of El Paso, these processes together created the swath of contested land known as "El Chamizal" or the "Chamizal Zone." While Americans exerted control and jurisdiction over the territory, the State of Mexico never relinquished its claim to the zone. Residents of Ciudad Juárez who had owned and farmed land within Partido Chamizal also never gave up their claims.

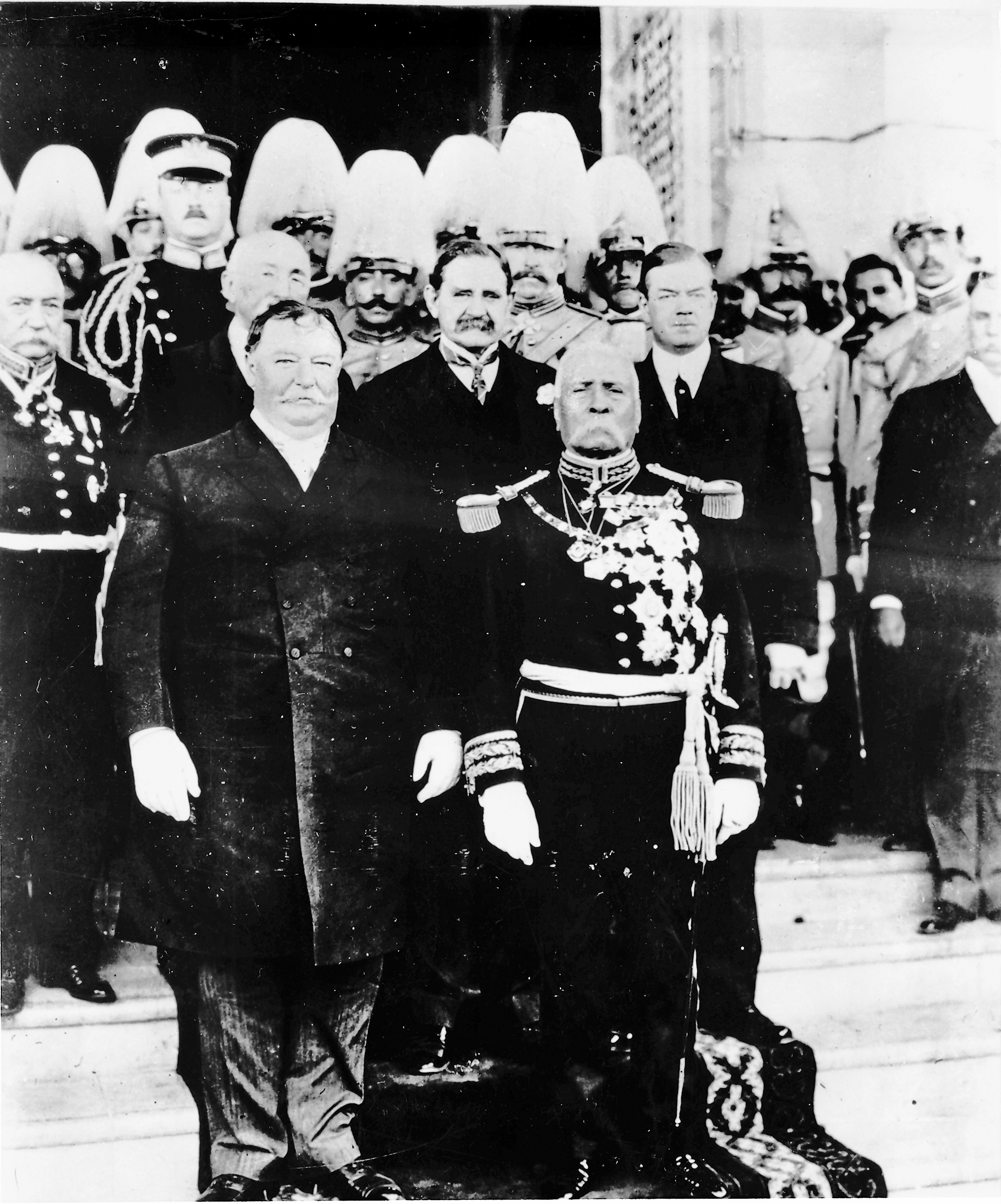
Presidents William Howard Taft and Porfirio Díaz at their historic summit in Ciudad Juárez, Mexico, a historic first meeting between a U.S. and Mexican President, and the first time a U.S. president crossed into Mexico.

Over the many decades that followed, multiple efforts on the part of both Americans and Mexicans were made to resolve this conflict. Each time, these efforts failed. Tensions over the territory during the historic Taft–Díaz summit almost resulted in the attempted assassination of both presidents on October 16, 1909.

In 1961, in the midst of the Cold War and with worries over Mexico's potential allyship with Cuba mounting, U.S. president John F. Kennedy broached the idea of perhaps finally setting this conflict. Negotiations coalesced, in 1963, with the Chamizal Treaty, which was ratified in 1964. The settlement identified 630 acres in South El Paso as El Chamizal and promised to return this acreage to Ciudad Juárez. The Chamizal Zone was officially ceded to and became incorporated into the Republic of Mexico on October 28, 1967. The Chamizal Treaty brought about the first time the United States gave inhabited land back to Mexico. Other minor land exchanges occurred under the Banco Convention of 1905 and the Boundary Treaty of 1970, including Rio Rico in 1977.

The Spanish word "Chamizal" comes from chamizo or chamiza, the common name for the four-wing saltbush (Atriplex canescens) which covered the disputed land near the present-day park. It is a rather ordinary looking shrub that thrives in diverse soil and climatic conditions. The chamiza once grew prolifically in the Chamizal Zone because of the salty soil deposited by the river and the constant movement of this soil across the river's alluvial plain. With roots reaching a depth of as much as 15 feet, the chamiza stabilized the soil and protected against eroding watersheds. With increased urbanization in both El Paso and Ciudad Juárez through the 20th century, however, the once-prolific chamiza became increasingly scarce in the area.

== Origins (1848–1899) ==
The Treaty of Guadalupe Hidalgo (which officially ended the Mexican–American War) defined the international border as the line along the middle of the deepest channel in the Rio Grande, continuously in tandem with any fluctuation in its channels or its banks. In 1884, another treaty modified this by explicitly accepting the internationally established doctrine known as "the law of accretion" that specifies that the line of a river-defined border shall follow the changing path of the boundary river only in response to gradual alluvial deposition, but that sudden avulsion shall not affect the borderline.

The river continually shifted south between 1848 and the early 1900s, with the most radical shifts in the river occurring after floods in 1862, 1864, and 1865. By 1873 the river had moved approximately 600 acres (240 ha; 2.4 km^{2}), cutting off land that was in effect made United States territory. The newly exposed land came to be known as El Chamizal, and eventually the land was settled and incorporated as part of El Paso. Both Mexico and the United States claimed the land. In 1895, Mexican citizens filed suit in the Juárez Primary Court of Claims to reclaim the land. The newly formed International Boundary Commission took up the case that same year, titling the case "Chamizal case no.4."

In 1899, both countries dug a channel across the heel of the horseshoe bend of the river at the dispute site for flood control purposes. This moved a 385-acre (156 ha; 1.56 km^{2}) tract of land to the U.S. side of the river, but as man-made alterations do not change the boundary, this tract of land remained Mexican territory. This tract of land came to be known as Cordova Island, in a sense it was an island belonging to Mexico inside U.S. territory. Thus, there was little or no control by the local authorities, which created a haven for crime and opportunities for illegal crossings.

Estimates for El Chamizal total anywhere between 590 and 1600 acres; but, in truth, its exact size and location remains highly contested and is perhaps impossible to define due to limited and cursory documentation for the river's meanderings.

== Disputes and controversy (1899–1963) ==
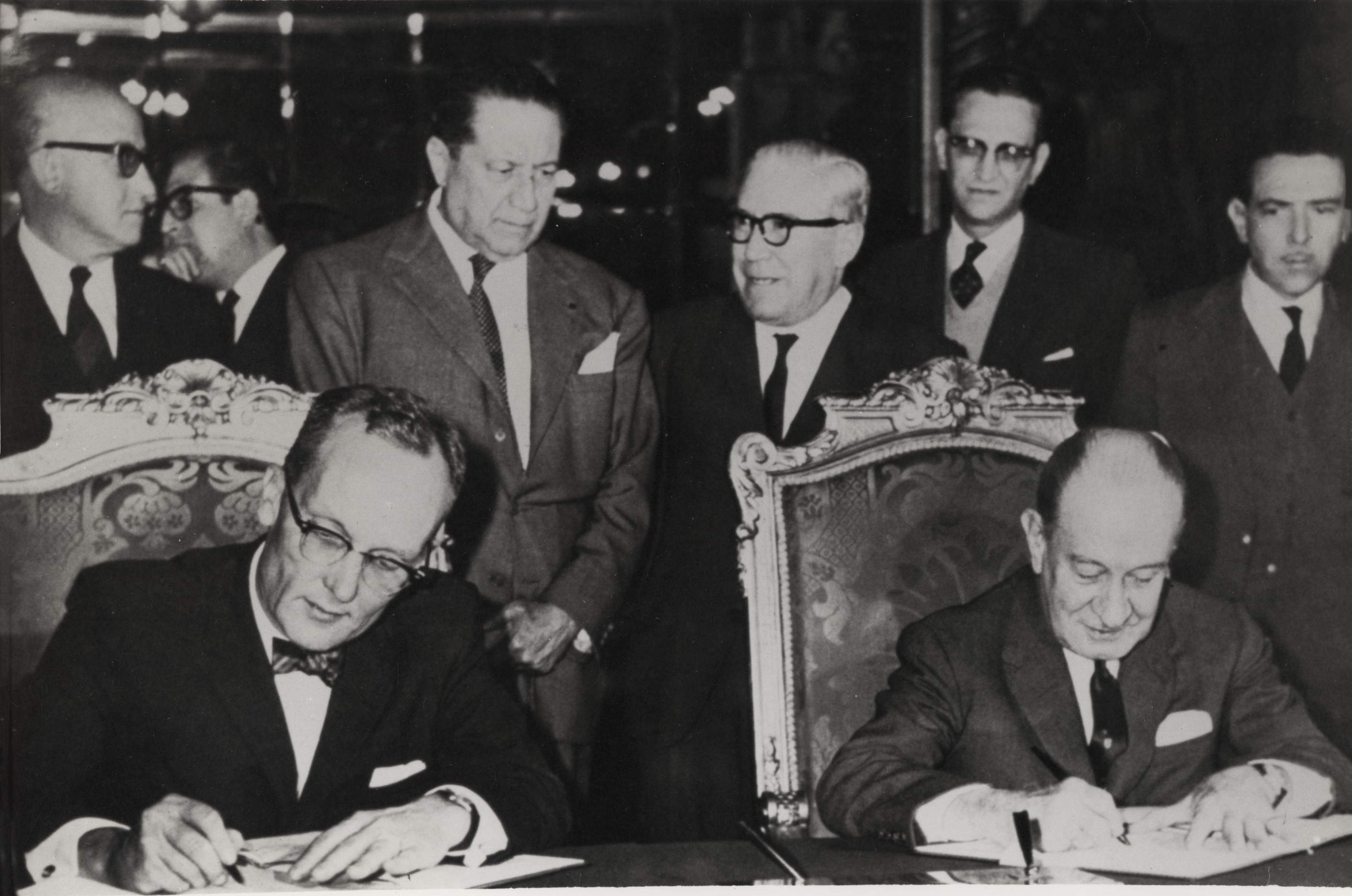
U.S. Ambassador to Mexico, Thomas C. Mann (left) and the Mexican Secretary of Foreign Affairs, Manuel Tello Baurraud (right) sign the Chamizal Convention in Mexico City on 29 August 1963.

In 1909, Porfirio Díaz and William Howard Taft planned a summit in Ciudad Juárez and El Paso, a historic first meeting between a Mexican and a U.S. president and also the first time an American president would cross the border into Mexico. But tensions rose on both sides of the border over El Chamizal, which any route from El Paso to Ciudad Juárez would cross, even though it would be considered neutral territory with no flags present during the summit. The Texas Rangers, 4,000 U.S. and Mexican troops, U.S. Secret Service agents, federal agents and U.S. marshals were all called in to provide security. Frederick Russell Burnham, the celebrated scout, was put in charge of a 250-person private security detail hired by John Hays Hammond, who in addition to owning large investments in Mexico was a close friend of Taft from Yale and a U.S. vice-presidential candidate in 1908. On October 16, the day of the summit, Burnham and Private C.R. Moore, a Texas Ranger, discovered a man holding a concealed palm pistol standing at the El Paso Chamber of Commerce building along the procession route. Burnham and Moore captured, disarmed, and arrested the assassin within only a few feet of Díaz and Taft.

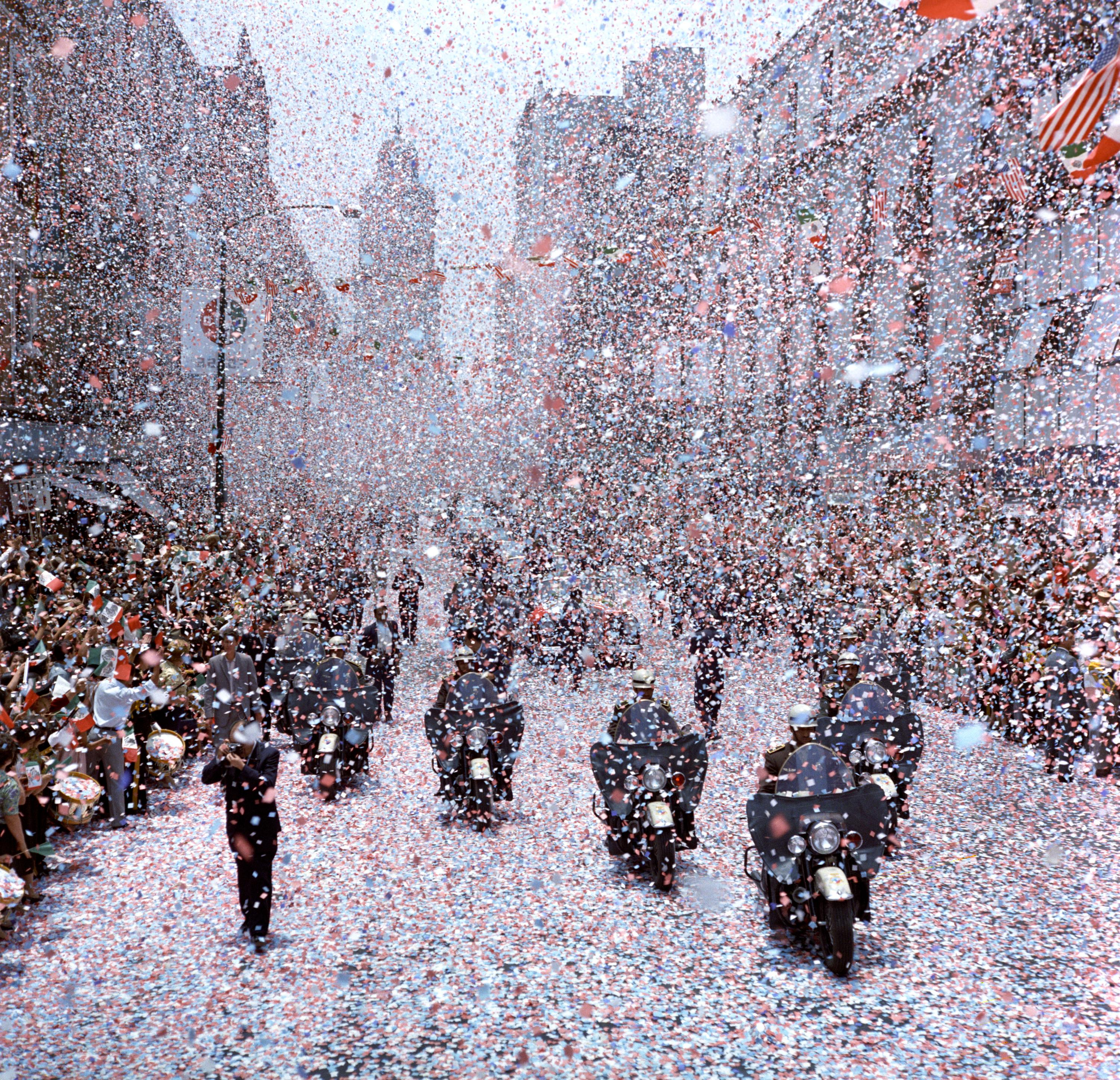
Mexicans celebrate in June 1962 as JFK visits Mexico City shortly before the end of the dispute.

In 1910 Mexico and the United States agreed to have the dispute settled by the International Boundary and Water Commission, a body that had been created in 1889 to maintain the boundary (and which was subsequently expanded pursuant to subsequent treaties, in order to allocate river waters between the two nations, and provide for flood control and water sanitation). A tribunal was established comprising a representative from each country and a Canadian jurist, Eugène Lafleur, as presiding officer to investigate and deliberate over whether the change in the river's course had been gradual, whether the boundaries set by treaties were fixed, and whether the 1848 treaty applied. Mexico claimed that the boundary had never changed and therefore that the Chamizal was technically Mexican territory, while the United States claimed that the 1848 convention applied, that the boundary was the result of sudden erosion, and that the property therefore belonged to the United States.

The tribunal recommended that year that part of the disputed tract lying between the riverbed, as surveyed in 1852, and the middle of the river in 1864 would become United States territory and the remainder of the tract become part of Mexico. The United States rejected the proposal on grounds that it did not conform to the agreements of the arbitration – instead it fuelled an ongoing dispute between the two governments and fostered ill-will.

Between 1911 and 1963 various presidents made several more attempts to resolve the issue. Amongst the suggested compromises were forgiving debt, exchange of other territory along the Rio Grande, direct purchase of the tract, and inclusion of the Chamizal in the Rio Grande Rectification Project. The dispute continued to affect Mexico–United States relations adversely until President John F. Kennedy agreed to settle it on the basis of the 1911 arbitration award. It was hoped that settlement of the dispute would strengthen the Alliance for Progress and solidify the Organization of American States.

== Resolution ==
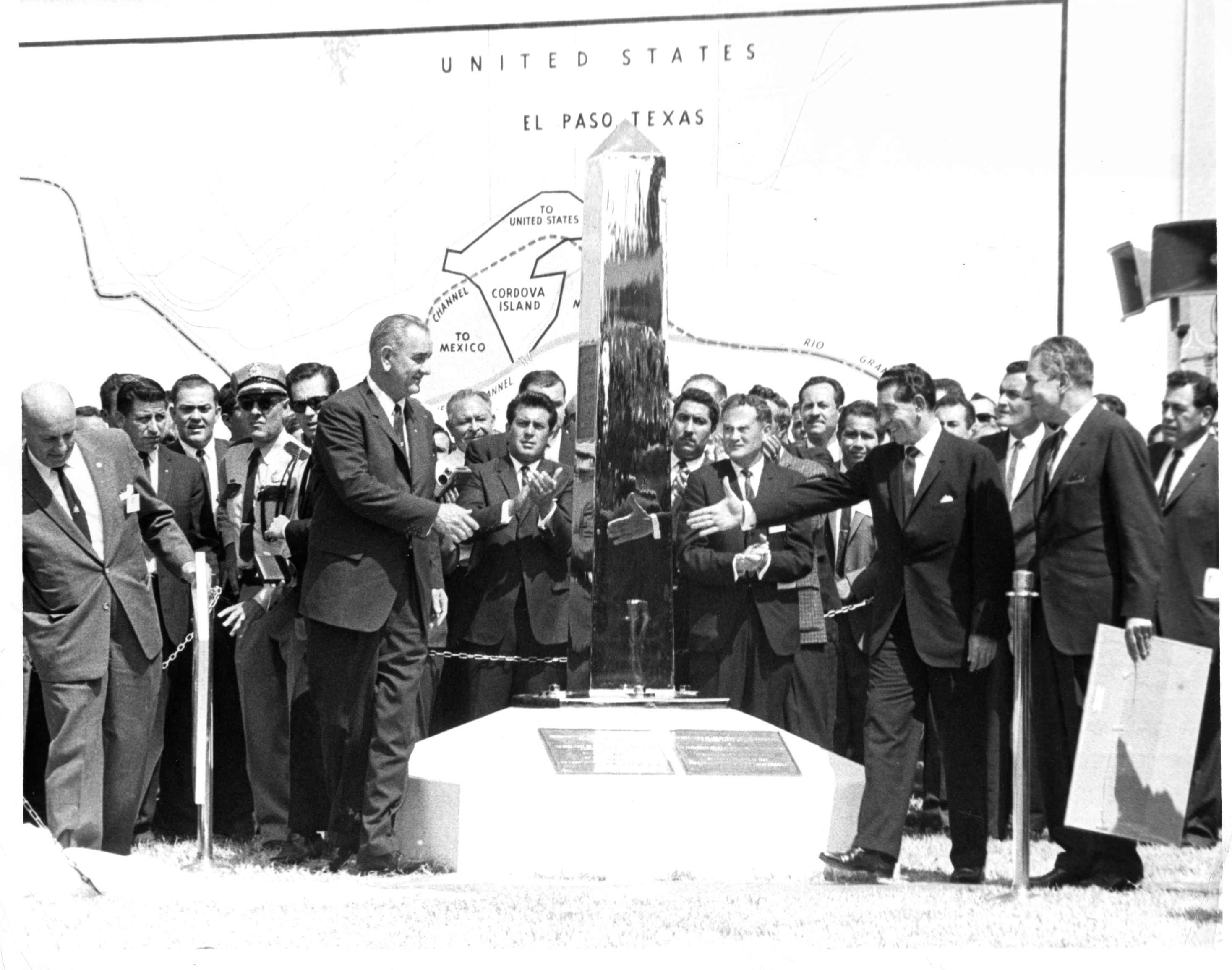
U.S. President Lyndon B. Johnson (left) and Mexican President Adolfo López Mateos (right) unveil the new boundary marker signaling the peaceful end of the Chamizal dispute on 25 September 1964.

The dispute was formally settled on January 14, 1964, when the United States and Mexico ratified a treaty that generally followed the 1911 arbitration recommendations. The agreement awarded to Mexico 366 acres (148 ha; 1.48 km^{2}) of the Chamizal area and 264 acres (107 ha; 1.07 km^{2}) east of the adjacent Cordova Island. Although no payments were made between the two governments, the United States received compensation from a private Mexican bank for 382 structures included in the transfer. The United States also received 193 acres (78 ha; 0.78 km^{2}) of Cordova Island from Mexico, and the two nations agreed to share equally in the cost of re-channeling the river. In 1964, Presidents Adolfo López Mateos and Lyndon B. Johnson met at the border to end the dispute. On September 17, 1963, the U.S. Congress introduced the American–Mexican Chamizal Convention Act of 1964, which finally settled the matter. In October 1967, President Johnson met with President Gustavo Díaz Ordaz on the border and formally proclaimed the settlement.

One of the aims of the Chamizal Convention was to build a man-made channel to prevent the Rio Grande from blurring the international boundary ever again. The channel was constructed of concrete, 167 feet (51 m) in width at the top and 15 feet (4.6 m) deep. The two governments shared the cost of the channel, along with the cost of three new bridges.

In order to complete the terms of the Chamizal Treaty, more than 5,600 El Paso residents were also displaced from their homes within the 630 acres ceded to Mexico. Many of these residents were American citizens. The IBC and the U.S. federal government worked together to evict and relocate these residents from the 630 acres, which included five residential areas of South El Paso known as: Rio Linda, Cotton Mill, Cordova Gardens, El Jardin, and the last two southern blocks of Segundo Barrio. Although many residents organized to resist their displacement, they were unsuccessful in doing so. As part of the Chamizal Relocation Project, residents who owned their homes were given fair-market value. Tenants, however, were simply evicted. Years later, many of these displaced residents called their shared experience of displacement the "Chamizal diaspora."

In 1974, the United States established a museum known as the Chamizal National Memorial to increase visitor awareness of cooperation, diplomacy and cultural values as a basic means to conflict resolution.

== See also ==
- Chamizal National Memorial
- Historic regions of the United States
- Rio Grande border disputes

== Sources ==
- Hammond, John Hays (1935). The Autobiography of John Hays Hammond. New York: Farrar & Rinehart. ISBN 0-405-05913-2.
- Hampton, Benjamin B (April 1, 1910). "The Vast Riches of Alaska". Hampton's Magazine. 24 (1).
- Harris, Charles H. III; Sadler, Louis R. (2009). The Secret War in El Paso: Mexican Revolutionary Intrigue, 1906-1920. Albuquerque, New Mexico: University of New Mexico Press. ISBN 978-0-8263-4652-0.
- Harris, Charles H. III; Sadler, Louis R. (2004). The Texas Rangers And The Mexican Revolution: The Bloodiest Decade. 1910–1920. Albuquerque, New Mexico: University of New Mexico Press. ISBN 0-8263-3483-0.
- van Wyk, Peter (2003). Burnham: King of Scouts. Victoria, BC, Canada: Trafford Publishing. ISBN 1-4120-0901-4.
- "Mr. Taft's Peril; Reported Plot to Kill Two Presidents". Daily Mail. London. October 16, 1909. ISSN 0307-7578.
