= Chamizal National Memorial =

National memorial park in El Paso, Texas, United States

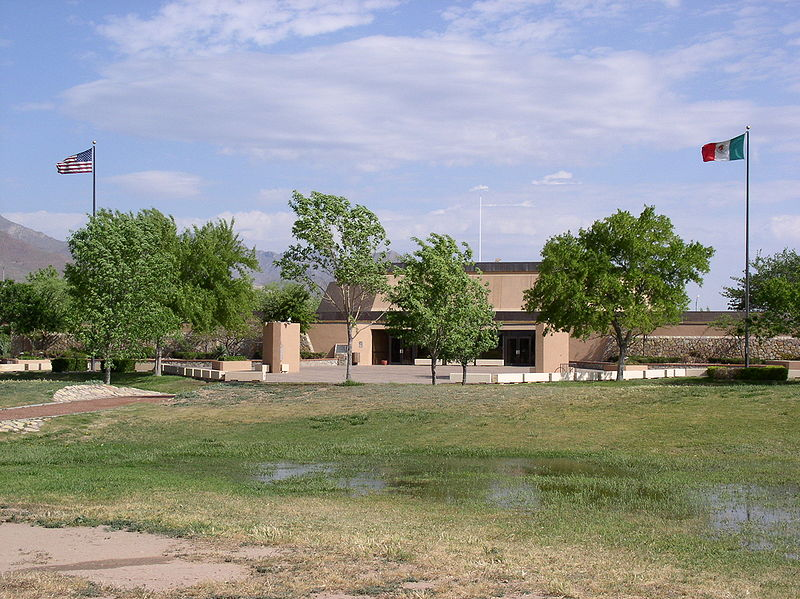
- Visitor Center at Chamizal National Memorial

- Location within Texas Location within the United States
- Location: Paisano Dr., El Paso, Texas, USA
- Coordinates: 31°46′4″N 106°27′15″W
- Area: 54.90 acres (22.22 ha)
- Established: February 4, 1974
- Visitors: 8,324 (in 2023)
- Governing body: National Park Service
- Website: Chamizal National Memorial
- Chamizal National Memorial
- U.S. National Register of Historic Places
- U.S. National Memorial
- Built: 1848
- NRHP reference No.: 74002069
- Added to NRHP: February 2, 1974

Chamizal National Memorial, located in El Paso, Texas, along the United States–Mexico international border, is a National Park Service site commemorating the peaceful settlement of the Chamizal boundary dispute.

== Facility ==
The 54.90-acre (22.22 ha) memorial park serves primarily as a cultural center and contains art galleries, a theater, and an amphitheatre. A museum, which details the history of the U.S.–Mexico border, is located inside the visitor center. The park honors the peaceful resolution of the Chamizal dispute, a more than 100-year border dispute between the United States and Mexico that resulted from the natural change of course of the Rio Grande between the cities of El Paso and Ciudad Juárez, Chihuahua. This national memorial was established on part of the disputed land that was assigned to the United States according to the Chamizal Convention of 1963; a corresponding Parque Público Federal El Chamizal was created on the now-Mexican portion of the land. The Chamizal Convention was negotiated by the International Boundary and Water Commission, which was established in 1889 to maintain the border, and pursuant to later treaties to allocate river waters between the two nations, and provide for flood control and water sanitation.

== Administrative history ==
The National Memorial was authorized on June 30, 1966. It was established as a National Park Service unit on February 4, 1974, and was administratively listed on the National Register of Historic Places the same day.

== Admission and hours ==
Fees and permits are required to use the theater. Fees are also charged for picnic facilities for groups of 50 or more.

Park grounds, 5 a.m. - 10 p.m. daily. Closed Thanksgiving, Christmas and New Year's Day.

Visitors center and galleries open 10 a.m. - 5 p.m . Administration office open 8 a.m. - 4:30 p.m.

== See also ==
- National Register of Historic Places listings in El Paso County, Texas
- List of national memorials of the United States
