= Boundary Treaty of 1970 =

1970 treaty between the United States and Mexico

Treaty to Resolve Pending Boundary Differences and Maintain the Rio Grande and Colorado River as the International Boundary
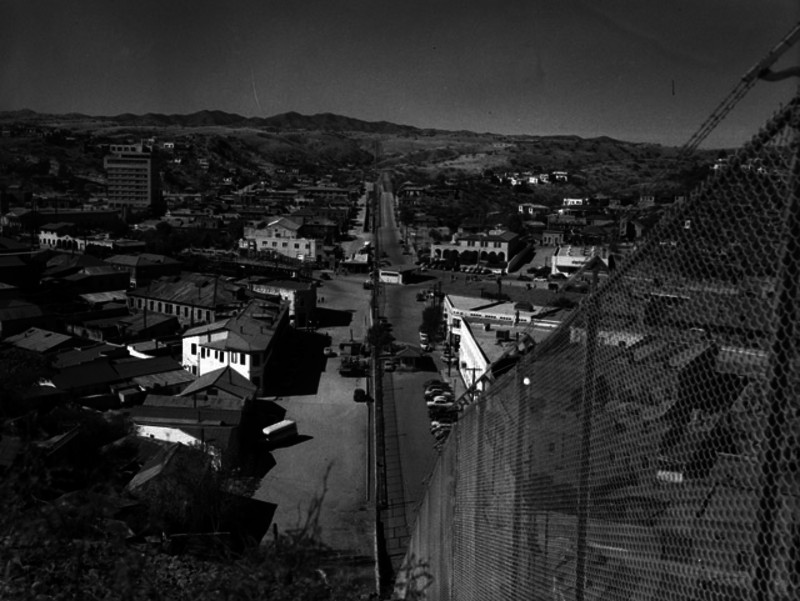
- Border of Nogales and the United States in 1950
- Signed: November 23, 1970
- Location: Mexico City
- Effective: April 18, 1972
- Signatories: Mexico; United States
- Citations: T.I.A.S. 7313
- Languages: English; Spanish

The Boundary Treaty of 1970 is a treaty between the United States and Mexico that settled all outstanding boundary disputes and uncertainties related to the Rio Grande (Río Bravo del Norte) border between them.

The most significant dispute remaining after the Chamizal Settlement in 1963 involved the location of the boundary in the area of Presidio, Texas, and Ojinaga, Chihuahua. The river channel was relocated to approximate conditions existing prior to the dispute that arose from changes in the course of the river in 1907. The International Boundary and Water Commission was charged with its implementation. The American-Mexican Treaty Act of October 25, 1972 authorized participation by the United States IBWC section. The project commenced in 1975 and completed in 1977.

== Provisions ==
The river was relocated in two reaches by the construction of a new 4.7-mile (7.6 km) channel in one reach and 3.6 miles (5.8 km) in the other. The relocated channel was aligned in the reach above Presidio-Ojinaga so as to transfer from north to the south side of the river 1,606.19 acres (650.00 ha) and in the second reach downstream from the two cities so as to transfer from the south to the north side a net area of 252 acres (102 ha). It is an earth channel with dimensions patterned after the natural channel. The United States acquired 1,969.22 acres (796.92 ha) of American agricultural land that was used for the transfer of lands to Mexico and for half of the river relocation.

Also, the channel of the Rio Grande in the Hidalgo–Reynosa area was relocated to transfer from Mexico to the United States 481.68 acres (194.93 ha) by constructing a new 1.6-mile (2.6 km) flood control channel. This transfer was made in exchange for the transfer from the United States to Mexico of other land, including five parcels near Presidio, the Horcón Tract (after 1906 located south of the Rio Grande), and Beaver Island (La Isla de Morteritos), located in the river south of Roma, Texas, comprising 481.68 acres (194.93 ha) in total. This provision transferred to Mexico the portion of the town of Río Rico, Tamaulipas, located within the Horcón Tract.

The cost of the two relocations was shared equally by the two governments, with the United States performing the greater part of the work required in the Presidio-Ojinaga area, and Mexico performing the work required in the Hidalgo-Reynosa area and a small part of the work required in the Presidio-Ojinaga area.

On November 24, 2009, the U.S. ceded six islands in the Rio Grande to Mexico. At the same time, Mexico ceded three islands and two bancos to the U.S. This transfer, which had been pending for 20 years, was the first application of Article III of the 1970 Boundary Treaty.

== See also ==
- Rio Grande border disputes
- United States territorial acquisitions
- Mexico–United States border

== Sources ==
- "US-Mexico Joint Projects". Ibwc.state.gov. Archived from the original on 2006-01-06.
