= Río Rico, Tamaulipas =

Mexican village in Tamaulipas state

Río Rico
- Village
- Interactive map of Río Rico
- Location within Tamaulipas Location within Mexico
- Coordinates: 26°03′28″N 97°53′24″W
- Country: Mexico
- State: Tamaulipas

Population (2020)
  - Total: 167
- Time zone: UTC-6 (CST)
  - Summer (DST): UTC-5 (CST)

Río Rico is a village located along the Rio Grande in the Mexican state of Tamaulipas. It includes a portion of the Horcón Tract, a narrow 461-acre (1.87 km^{2}) piece of land (including former riverbed) that was part of the United States until 1977.

The Horcón Tract was originally north of the meandering river—and thus part of the U.S. state of Texas—until an unauthorized diversion of the river to its north cut it off from the rest of the state in 1906. Río Rico was founded years later, in 1929, and developed as a de facto Mexican settlement.

In 1967, an American geography professor discovered what had happened and it was determined that parts of Río Rico were legally on U.S. territory, making those who were born there American citizens by birthright. The international border was moved under the terms of the Boundary Treaty of 1970, placing the tract and the village in Mexico, effective in 1977.

== History ==
In 1845, the Rio Grande was established as the border between Mexico and the U.S. state of Texas. The river has many meanders, which result in "fingers" of land that are nearly surrounded by territory of the other country, such as the Horcón Tract, a 413-acre (1.67 km^{2}) finger that was surrounded by the river (and Mexico) except for a narrow connection at its northeast end. (The zig-zag of the river formed a reciprocal tract in Mexico, connected at its southwest end.)

In July 1906, the American Rio Grande Land and Irrigation Company, as a measure to regulate the river's water flow for irrigation purposes, dug a cutoff to shorten the course of the river, thus bypassing the tract. The diversion was unauthorized, and the company was taken to court by the U.S. and Mexican landowners. In December, 1907, the company was fined $10,000, ordered to convey its ownership of land in the Horcón Tract to the landowners, and ordered to pay damages and costs of $7,200 The diversion of the river, being practically impossible to reverse, was allowed to stand. The land was agreed to remain American territory, in accordance with an 1884 border treaty, under the principle of international law that only natural changes in the course of a river affect borders.

However, the former riverbed dried up rather than forming an oxbow lake, and the company never put up border markers, leaving the tract barely distinguishable from the adjacent Mexican territory. Due to the prohibition of alcohol in the U.S., a resort destination grew up there during the 1920s and 1930s, with free-flowing liquor and gambling. In 1929, the Mexican village of Río Rico was founded near the tract, and as the Rio Grande changed its course after floods, the settlement progressively moved into it. The residents, being mostly of Mexican heritage, accepted the authority of the Mexican government, and all parties generally acted as if the tract were Mexican territory.

The discrepancy was brought to light decades later. The Boundary Treaty of 1970 provided for the Horcón Tract to become part of Mexico upon the completion of two new flood control projects. In 1972 the United States officially ceded the tract of land to Mexico, and it was formally annexed by the state of Tamaulipas. The formal handover took place in 1977. After one former resident filed a lawsuit to prevent the United States Immigration and Naturalization Service from deporting him, the Board of Immigration Appeals ruled that all people born in Río Rico between 1906 and 1972 could claim U.S. citizenship by birthright. As a result, a large portion of the village's population moved to the United States proper.

== See also ==
- Rio Grande border disputes
  - Chamizal dispute
- Border irregularities of the United States
- Northwest Angle
- Point Roberts, Washington
- Missouri Bootheel
