= Banco Convention of 1905 =

1905 treaty between the United States and Mexico

Convention Between the United States and Mexico for the Elimination of the Bancos in the Rio Grande from the Effects of Article II of the Treaty of November 12, 1884
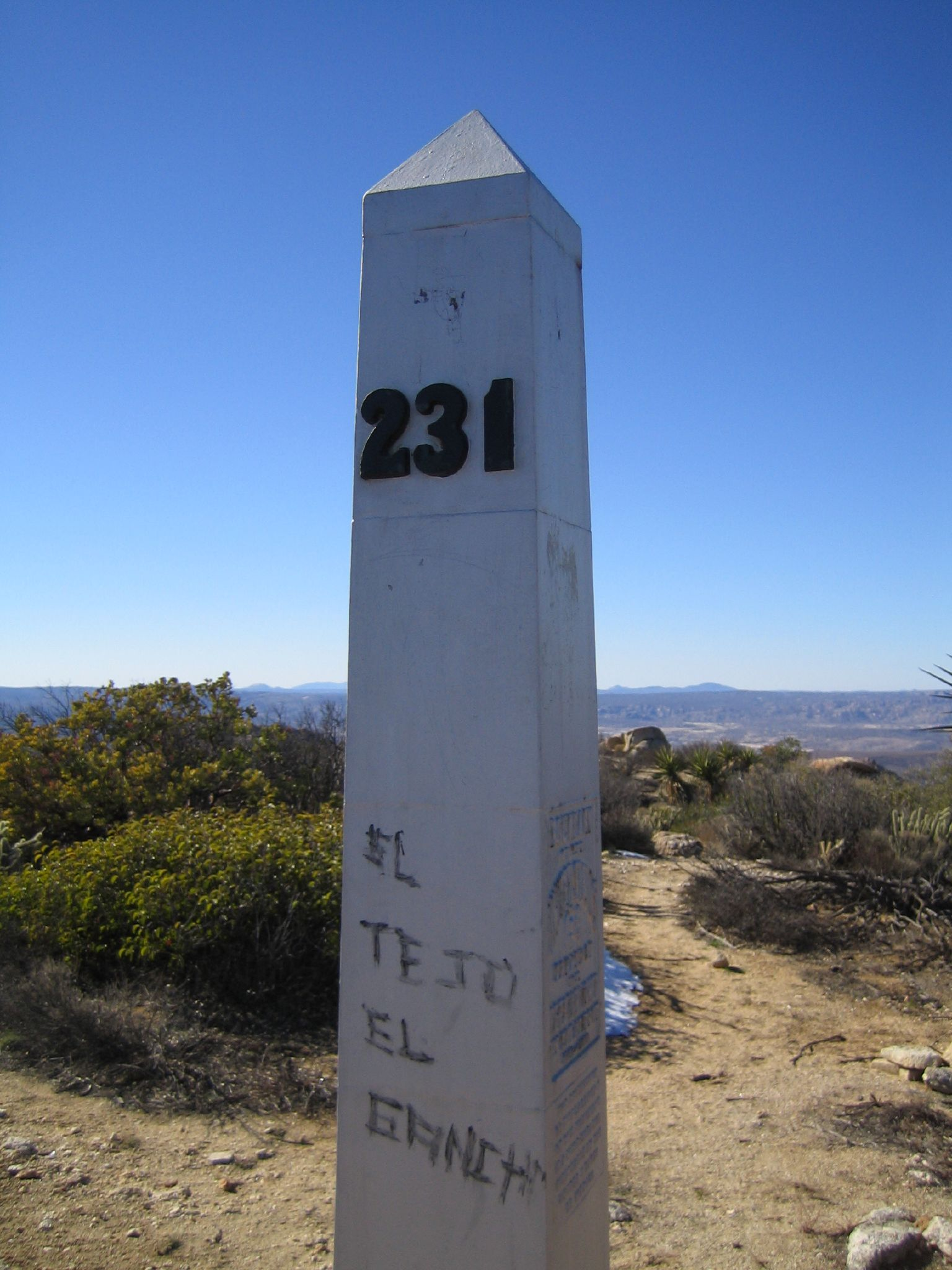
- Mexico-US border monument 231
- Signed: March 20, 1905
- Location: Washington, D.C.
- Effective: June 5, 1907
- Negotiators: Alvey A. Adee; M. de Azpiroz
- Signatories: Theodore Roosevelt; Porfirio Díaz
- Parties: Mexico; United States
- Languages: English; Spanish

The Banco Convention of 1905, between the United States and Mexico, was negotiated and signed in 1905 and ratified by both nations in 1907. It resulted in 247 exchanges of bancos (land surrounded by bends in the river that became segregated by a cutoff often by the rapid erosion of the river channel) between the two nations from 1910 to 1976. Most of them were in the Lower Rio Grande Valley, the Presidio Valley and the El Paso-Juarez Valley. In 1927, the convention was applied to the short international border on the Colorado River.

== Background ==
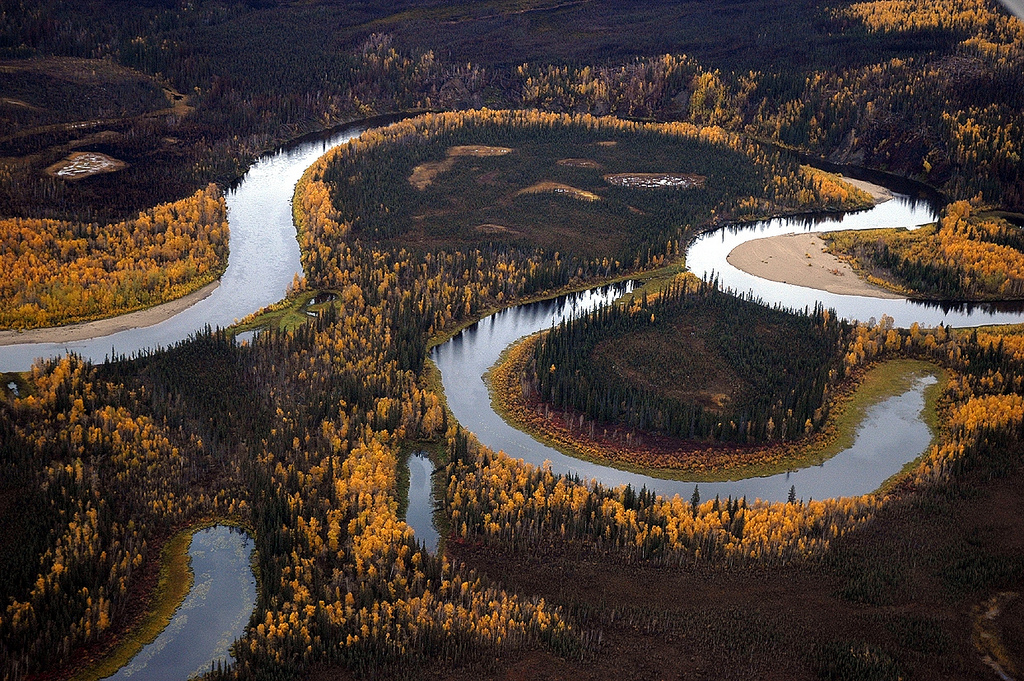
An example of a banco, created when a meander is cut off by a new, shorter channel, leaving a cut-off section of land surrounded by a U-shaped oxbow lake.

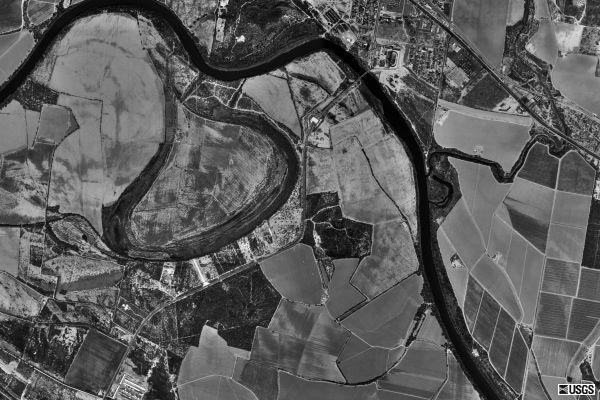
Aerial photo of Ringgold Banco, opposite Rio Grande City, Texas; exchanged from the United States to Mexico on September 26, 1949.

In 1884, a further treaty set out to clarify the 1848 Treaty of Guadalupe Hidalgo. The Convention of November 12, 1884 established the rules for determining the location of the US-Mexico boundary when the meandering rivers of the international border transferred tracts of land from one bank of the river to the other. The treaty stated that if the river changed course gradually through a process of soil erosion, then the boundary should follow the new course of the river. However, a sudden change of course, for example one caused by a flood, would not affect the boundary. Nevertheless, the clarifications established in the treaty of 1884 did not resolve the question of land ownership.

The Convention of March 1, 1889 established the International Boundary Commission (IBC) to apply the rules in the 1884 Convention. It was modified by the Banco Convention of March 20, 1905 to retain the courses of the Rio Grande and the Colorado River as international boundaries in the event of sudden changes.

Because the course of the Rio Grande was not static, to maintain the location of the river as the international boundary presented diplomatic and practical challenges. The river changed course frequently where it flowed through areas of relatively loose alluvial soil, doubling back on itself as it wound its way through the Lower Rio Grande Valley. Especially in times of flooding, tracts of land called "bancos" were created by avulsive changes that cut off entire oxbow-shaped meanders.

The result of these cut-offs was often confusion regarding sovereignty, land ownership, and law enforcement. The purpose of the 1905 convention was to eliminate these bancos from the effects of Article II of the US-Mexico Convention of 1884, to which they otherwise would have been subject, and to establish a more definitive means to settle matters. Any bancos larger than 250 hectares (620 acres) or with a population over 200 were excluded from the 1905 convention.

== Effects ==
The International Boundary and Water Commission was charged with implementing the convention. Under the treaty, the following transfers involving Texas occurred from 1910 to 1976:

Year	No. of bancos	Acres to USA	Acres to Mexico	Year	No. of bancos	Acres to USA	Acres to Mexico
1910	57	5,357.2	3,101.2	1942	1	63.3	0
1912	31	1,094.4	2,343.0	1943	4	482.9	100.5
1928	42	3,089.9	1,407.8	1944	14	253.7	166.2
1930	31	4,685.6	984.3	1945	16	240.9	333.5
1931	4	158.4	328.7	1946	1	185.8	0
1932	2	159.7	0	1949	2	190.2	281.9
1933	1	0	122.1	1956	1	508.3	0
1934	1	278.1	0	1968	1	0	154.6
1939	1	240.2	0	1970	21	449.8	1,881.8
1940	2	0	209.5	1976	6	49.2	0
1941	6	224.5	246.9	Total	245	17,712 acres (71.68 km^{2})	11,662 acres (47.19 km^{2})

In 1927 under this convention, the U.S. acquired two bancos from Mexico at the Colorado River border with Arizona. Farmers Banco, covering 583.4 acres (2.361 km^{2}), a part of the Cocopah Indian Reservation, was ceded to the U.S. with controversy. Fain Banco, of 259 acres (105 ha), also became U.S. soil.

Below is a list of the 247 bancos that were exchanged under the terms of the 1905 convention. This information is also available as a kmz file from Google Maps.

Banco Name	Banco #	Latitude (North)	Longitude (West)	Map coordinates	IBWC Minute No.	Transfer Date	Year of transfer	Acres Cut from Mexico (to USA)	Acres Cut from USA (to Mexico)	Location	Description on minute or map (source: IBWC website)
La Burrita	1	25.945833	97.267471	25.945833°N 97.267471°W	n/a	March 29, 1910	1910		23.7	Lower Rio Grande Valley	Matamoros, Tamaulipas, south of Estrella Ranch and about 12 km west of the mouth of the Rio Grande
San Juan de Arriba	2	25.83913	97.383978	25.83913°N 97.383978°W	n/a	March 29, 1910	1910		23.2	Lower Rio Grande Valley	Matamoros, Tamaulipas, south of San Rafael Ranch and about 14 km southeast of Brownsville
Longoreno	3	25.84444	97.38861	25.84444°N 97.38861°W	n/a	March 29, 1910	1910	138.1		Lower Rio Grande Valley	Cameron County, Texas, south of San Rafael Ranch and about 13 km southeast of Brownsville
La Canasta	4	25.85083	97.42194	25.85083°N 97.42194°W	n/a	March 29, 1910	1910	126.5		Lower Rio Grande Valley	Cameron County, Texas, southwest of Raab's Place and about 10 km southeast of Brownsville
Fernandez	4 1/2	25.871357	97.467529	25.871357°N 97.467529°W	n/a	March 29, 1910	1910		224.1	Lower Rio Grande Valley	Matamoros, Tamaulipas, about 2 km southwest of Santa Rosalia Ranch and about 5 km southeast of Brownsville
Trevino Canales	5	25.90111	97.51306	25.90111°N 97.51306°W	n/a	March 29, 1910	1910	249.3		Lower Rio Grande Valley	Cameron County, Texas, about 1 km southwest of Brownsville
Phillips	6	25.923336	97.525556	25.923336°N 97.525556°W	n/a	March 29, 1910	1910	111.4		Lower Rio Grande Valley	Cameron County, Texas, about 3 km northwest of Brownsville
Tahuachalito	7	25.98417	97.60639	25.98417°N 97.60639°W	n/a	March 29, 1910	1910	178.9		Lower Rio Grande Valley	Cameron County, Texas, about 1 km west of San Pedro Ranch and about 13 km northwest of Brownsville
La Isla	8	25.992358	97.62925	25.992358°N 97.62925°W	n/a	March 29, 1910	1910		157.9	Lower Rio Grande Valley	Matamoros, Tamaulipas, about 3 km southwest of Naranjo Ranch and about 16 km northwest of Brownsville
Tahuachal	9	26.01056	97.62194	26.01056°N 97.62194°W	n/a	March 29, 1910	1910	83		Lower Rio Grande Valley	Cameron County, Texas, southwest of Naranjo Ranch and about 16 km northwest of Brownsville
Benavides	10	26.02917	97.65611	26.02917°N 97.65611°W	n/a	March 29, 1910	1910	130.2		Lower Rio Grande Valley	Cameron County, Texas, west of La Union Ranch and about 20 km northwest of Brownsville
Rafael Garcia	11	26.038667	97.663061	26.038667°N 97.663061°W	n/a	March 29, 1910	1910	28.2		Lower Rio Grande Valley	Cameron County, Texas, about 1 km northwest of Refugio Ranch and about 21 km northwest of Brownsville
Fresnal	12	26.022078	97.678853	26.022078°N 97.678853°W	n/a	March 29, 1910	1910		223.1	Lower Rio Grande Valley	Matamoros, Tamaulipas, southeast of San Isidro Ranch and about 22 km northwest of Brownsville
Capote	13	26.03583	97.69278	26.03583°N 97.69278°W	n/a	March 29, 1910	1910	137.6		Lower Rio Grande Valley	Cameron County, Texas, about 1 km southeast of Las Flores Ranch and about 14 km southeast of the church in Santa Maria (Texas)
Llanito	14	26.04028	97.709167	26.04028°N 97.709167°W	n/a	March 29, 1910	1910	29.4		Lower Rio Grande Valley	Cameron County, Texas, southwest of Las Flores Ranch and about 13 km southeast of the church in Santa Maria (Texas)
Combe	15	26.02912	97.72522	26.02912°N 97.72522°W	n/a	March 29, 1910	1910		79.6	Lower Rio Grande Valley	Matamoros, Tamaulipas, about 3 km southwest of Las Flores Ranch and about 13 km southeast of the church in Santa Maria, Texas
Panola	16	26.030176	97.757436	26.030176°N 97.757436°W	n/a	March 29, 1910	1910		62.3	Lower Rio Grande Valley	Matamoros, Tamaulipas, about 2 km southeast of the San Benito Pumping Plant and about 11 km southeast of the church in Santa Maria, Texas
Mainero	17	26.032356	97.757447	26.032356°N 97.757447°W	n/a	March 29, 1910	1910		207.6	Lower Rio Grande Valley	Matamoros, Tamaulipas, about 2 km southeast of the San Benito Pumping Plant and about 10 km southeast of the church in Santa Maria, Texas
Las Sierritas	18	26.044444	97.753056	26.044444°N 97.753056°W	n/a	March 29, 1910	1910	134.4		Lower Rio Grande Valley	Cameron County, Texas, southeast of the San Benito Pumping Plant and about 9 km southeast of the church in Santa Maria (Texas)
Las Rusias	19	26.034108	97.760942	26.034108°N 97.760942°W	n/a	March 29, 1910	1910		105	Lower Rio Grande Valley	Matamoros, Tamaulipas, about 2 km south of the San Benito Pumping Plant and about 9 km southeast of the church in Santa Maria, Texas
Las Tranquitas	20	26.05056	97.75306	26.05056°N 97.75306°W	n/a	March 29, 1910	1910	129.5		Lower Rio Grande Valley	Cameron County, Texas, southeast of Las Rucias Ranch and about 8 km southeast of the church in Santa Maria (Texas)
Venado	21	26.035832	97.772848	26.035832°N 97.772848°W	n/a	March 29, 1910	1910		125.8	Lower Rio Grande Valley	Matamoros, Tamaulipas, southeast of Turner's House and about 8 km southeast of the church in Santa Maria, Texas
Turner	22	26.037521	97.797656	26.037521°N 97.797656°W	n/a	March 29, 1910	1910		32.1	Lower Rio Grande Valley	Matamoros, Tamaulipas, about 2 km southwest of Turner's House and about 6 km southeast of the church in Santa Maria, Texas
Soliseno	23	26.044167	97.784722	26.044167°N 97.784722°W	n/a	March 29, 1910	1910	221.7		Lower Rio Grande Valley	Cameron County, Texas, south of Galveston Ranch and about 5 km southeast of the church in Santa Maria (Texas)
Villitas	24	26.059167	97.821806	26.059167°N 97.821806°W	n/a	March 29, 1910	1910	76.85		Lower Rio Grande Valley	Cameron County, Texas, about 1 km southeast of Old Santa Maria Ranch and about 2 km southeast of the church in Santa Maria (Texas)
Palma	25	26.06472	97.83333	26.06472°N 97.83333°W	n/a	March 29, 1910	1910	198.2		Lower Rio Grande Valley	Cameron County, Texas, about 1 km southeast of Santa Maria Church and about 11 km east of Progreso (Toluca Ranch)
El Zurron	26	26.06583	97.85194	26.06583°N 97.85194°W	n/a	March 29, 1910	1910	238.2		Lower Rio Grande Valley	Cameron County, Texas, southwest of Nealeville and about 9 km east of Progreso (Toluca Ranch)
La Bolsa	27	26.076389	97.863889	26.076389°N 97.863889°W	n/a	March 29, 1910	1910	192.5		Lower Rio Grande Valley	Hidalgo and Cameron Counties, Texas, south of Sacatal Ranch and about 8 km east of Progreso (Toluca Ranch)
Cantu	28	26.065556	97.867778	26.065556°N 97.867778°W	n/a	March 29, 1910	1910	41.3		Lower Rio Grande Valley	Hidalgo County, Texas, about 2 km south of Sacatal Ranch and about 8 km east of Progreso (Toluca Ranch)
Villarreales	29	26.07333	97.91	26.07333°N 97.91°W	n/a	March 29, 1910	1910	153.2		Lower Rio Grande Valley	Hidalgo County, Texas, about 1 km east of Rosario Banco 31 and about 4 km east of Progreso (Toluca Ranch)
Santa Margarita	30	26.06722	97.92556	26.06722°N 97.92556°W	n/a	March 29, 1910	1910	283.2		Lower Rio Grande Valley	Hidalgo County, Texas, south of Rosario Ranch and about 2 km southeast of Progreso (Toluca Ranch)
Rosario	31	26.07333	97.92083	26.07333°N 97.92083°W	n/a	March 29, 1910	1910	272.1		Lower Rio Grande Valley	Hidalgo County, Texas, east of Rosario Ranch and about 2 km east of Progreso (Toluca Ranch); 1 km west of Banco Villareales 29
Toluca	32	26.052342	97.951335	26.052342°N 97.951335°W	n/a	March 29, 1910	1910		140.8	Lower Rio Grande Valley	Reynosa, Tamaulipas, northwest of San Lorenzo Ranch and about 2 km south of Progreso (Toluca Ranch), Texas
Arguelles	33	26.048607	97.971231	26.048607°N 97.971231°W	n/a	March 29, 1910	1910		336.8	Lower Rio Grande Valley	Reynosa, Tamaulipas, east of San Ysidro Ranch and about 4 km southwest of Progreso (Toluca Ranch), Texas
Santa Juanita	34	26.06833	97.981111	26.06833°N 97.981111°W	n/a	March 29, 1910	1910	40.5		Lower Rio Grande Valley	Hidalgo County, Texas, west of Arguelles Ranch and about 4 km west of Progreso (Toluca Ranch)
Eurestes	35	26.07361	98.0125	26.07361°N 98.0125°W	n/a	March 29, 1910	1910	93.2		Lower Rio Grande Valley	Hidalgo County, Texas, east of Ballines Ranch and about 7 km west of Progreso (Toluca Ranch)
Blanco (La Blanca)	36	26.062528	98.03021	26.062528°N 98.03021°W	n/a	March 29, 1910	1910		51.6	Lower Rio Grande Valley	Reynosa, Tamaulipas, about 2 km southeast of Blanco Ranch and about 8 km west of Progreso (Toluca Ranch), Texas
Las Bonitas	37	26.07389	98.035	26.07389°N 98.035°W	n/a	March 29, 1910	1910	381.8		Lower Rio Grande Valley	Hidalgo County, Texas, south of Blanco Ranch and about 9 km west of Progreso (Toluca Ranch)
Santa Rita	38	26.046458	98.078499	26.046458°N 98.078499°W	n/a	March 29, 1910	1910		155.7	Lower Rio Grande Valley	Reynosa, Tamaulipas, northwest of San Pedro Ranch and about 14 km west of Progreso (Toluca Ranch), Texas
Longoria	39	26.05278	98.066111	26.05278°N 98.066111°W	n/a	March 29, 1910	1910	132.7		Lower Rio Grande Valley	Hidalgo County, Texas, west of Santa Rita Ranch and about 12 km west of Progreso (Toluca Ranch)
San Juan del Rio	40	26.06889	98.1075	26.06889°N 98.1075°W	n/a	March 29, 1910	1910	31.9		Lower Rio Grande Valley	Hidalgo County, Texas, east of Young's Ranch and about 16 km west of Progreso (Toluca Ranch)
Cigarillo	41	26.058481	98.167578	26.058481°N 98.167578°W	n/a	March 29, 1910	1910		48.2	Lower Rio Grande Valley	Reynosa, Tamaulipas, north of San Joaquin Ranch and about 9 km southeast of Hidalgo, Texas
Juanita	42	26.058381	98.194124	26.058381°N 98.194124°W	n/a	March 29, 1910	1910		157.2	Lower Rio Grande Valley	Reynosa, Tamaulipas, north of Granilla Ranch and about 6 km southeast of Hidalgo, Texas
Santa Cruz	43	26.08583	98.22889	26.08583°N 98.22889°W	n/a	March 29, 1910	1910	338.5		Lower Rio Grande Valley	Hidalgo County, Texas, southeast of Capote Ranch and about 4 km southeast of Hidalgo
Grangeno	44	26.13278	98.308611	26.13278°N 98.308611°W	n/a	March 29, 1910	1910	207.3		Lower Rio Grande Valley	Hidalgo County, Texas, south of Grangeno Ranch and about 6 km northwest of Hidalgo
Anzaldua	45	26.14667	98.32917	26.14667°N 98.32917°W	n/a	March 29, 1910	1910	43		Lower Rio Grande Valley	Hidalgo County, Texas, south of Lomitas Ranch and about 9 km northwest of Hidalgo
Maria Inez (or Maria Ines)	46	26.168611	98.343889	26.168611°N 98.343889°W	n/a	March 29, 1910	1910	55.8		Lower Rio Grande Valley	Hidalgo County, Texas, northwest of Lomitas Ranch and about 11 km northwest of Hidalgo
Lomitas	47	26.153742	98.351473	26.153742°N 98.351473°W	n/a	March 29, 1910	1910		16.6	Lower Rio Grande Valley	Reynosa, Tamaulipas, northwest of Cavazos Ranch and about 11 km northwest of Hidalgo, Texas
King	48	26.18278	98.38528	26.18278°N 98.38528°W	n/a	March 29, 1910	1910	212		Lower Rio Grande Valley	Hidalgo County, Texas, west of Hedleys Ranch and about 16 km northwest of Hidalgo
Ojo de Agua	49	26.179815	98.426181	26.179815°N 98.426181°W	n/a	March 29, 1910	1910		68.2	Lower Rio Grande Valley	Reynosa, Tamaulipas, north of Barranco Ranch and about 18 km northwest of Hidalgo, Texas
Garza	51	26.21889	98.464479	26.21889°N 98.464479°W	n/a	March 29, 1910	1910		160.6	Lower Rio Grande Valley	Reynosa, Tamaulipas, about 5 km southeast of Havana Ranch and about 24 km northwest of Hidalgo, Texas
Pedro Vela	52	26.217325	98.470441	26.217325°N 98.470441°W	n/a	March 29, 1910	1910		94.9	Lower Rio Grande Valley	Reynosa, Tamaulipas, about 4 km southeast of Havana Ranch and about 25 km northwest of Hidalgo, Texas
Antonio Vela	53	26.233336	98.515278	26.233336°N 98.515278°W	n/a	March 29, 1910	1910	151.7		Lower Rio Grande Valley	Reynosa, Tamaulipas, about 1 km south of Havana Ranch and about 28 km northwest of Hidalgo, Texas
Santo Domingo	55	26.30833	98.69306	26.30833°N 98.69306°W	n/a	March 29, 1910	1910	302.7		Lower Rio Grande Valley	Starr County, Texas, south of Garcias Ranch and about 14 km southeast of Rio Grande City
Garza	56	26.364169	98.825	26.364169°N 98.825°W	n/a	March 29, 1910	1910		112.2	Lower Rio Grande Valley	Camargo, Tamaulipas, about 1 km south of Rio Grande City, Texas
Camargo	57	26.357839	98.825	26.357839°N 98.825°W	n/a	March 29, 1910	1910		494	Lower Rio Grande Valley	Camargo, Tamaulipas, about 2 km south of Rio Grande City, Texas
Yzaguirre (or Izaguirre)	58	26.37278	98.83806	26.37278°N 98.83806°W	n/a	March 29, 1910	1910	212.3		Lower Rio Grande Valley	Starr County, Texas, south of Garcia Ranch and about 2 km southwest of Rio Grande City; northeast of Banco Las Adjuntas 91
La Puerta	59	26.315197	98.750948	26.315197°N 98.750948°W	n/a	November 7, 1912	1912		320.5	Lower Rio Grande Valley	Camargo, Tamaulipas, north of Barrito Ranch and about 9 km southeast of Rio Grande City, Texas
San Francisco	60	26.29306	98.699444	26.29306°N 98.699444°W	n/a	November 7, 1912	1912	474.7		Lower Rio Grande Valley	Starr County, Texas, south of Santo Domingo Ranch and about 15 km southeast of Rio Grande City
Salado	61	26.236356	98.639472	26.236356°N 98.639472°W	n/a	November 7, 1912	1912		74.4	Lower Rio Grande Valley	Camargo, Tamaulipas, north of Villarreales Ranch and about 23 km southeast of Rio Grande City, Texas
Artesitas	62	26.236086	98.613761	26.236086°N 98.613761°W	n/a	November 7, 1912	1912		449.7	Lower Rio Grande Valley	Camargo, Tamaulipas, north of Potrero Ranch and about 11 km west of Havana
Los Ebanos	63	26.232247	98.566323	26.232247°N 98.566323°W	n/a	November 7, 1912	1912		120.1	Lower Rio Grande Valley	Camargo, Tamaulipas, 1 km south of Los Ebanos Ranch and about 6 km west of Havana
Tabasco	64	26.2	98.481389	26.2°N 98.481389°W	n/a	November 7, 1912	1912		44	Lower Rio Grande Valley	Reynosa, Tamaulipas, north of Carrizal Ranch and about 5 km southeast of Havana
Tortuga	65	26.161944	98.35222	26.161944°N 98.35222°W	n/a	November 7, 1912	1912	97.4		Lower Rio Grande Valley	Hidalgo County, Texas, 2 km west of Lomitas Ranch and about 11 km northwest of Hidalgo
Dougherty	66	26.101242	98.299836	26.101242°N 98.299836°W	n/a	November 7, 1912	1912		49.9	Lower Rio Grande Valley	Reynosa, Tamaulipas, 1 km southwest of Sabino Ranch and about 4 km west of Hidalgo
Jalisco	67	26.07806	98.16806	26.07806°N 98.16806°W	n/a	November 7, 1912	1912	51.6		Lower Rio Grande Valley	Hidalgo County, Texas, 1 km south of San Juan Hacienda and about 9 km east of Hidalgo
Zolezzi	68	26.07083	98.02778	26.07083°N 98.02778°W	n/a	November 7, 1912	1912	49.2		Lower Rio Grande Valley	Hidalgo County, Texas, east of Las Bonitas Ranch and about 8 km west of Toluca (Progreso P.O.)
Santander	69	26.059867	98.003983	26.059867°N 98.003983°W	n/a	November 7, 1912	1912		105.8	Lower Rio Grande Valley	Reynosa, Tamaulipas, northeast of San Jose Ranch and about 6 km southwest of Toluca (Progreso P.O.)
Saenz	70	26.050409	97.947	26.050409°N 97.947°W	n/a	November 7, 1912	1912		68	Lower Rio Grande Valley	Reynosa, Tamaulipas, northeast of San Lorenzo Ranch and about 2 km south of Toluca (Progreso P.O.)
Cipres	71	26.027435	97.702676	26.027435°N 97.702676°W	n/a	November 7, 1912	1912		23.7	Lower Rio Grande Valley	Matamoros, Tamaulipas, west of Capote Ranch and about 24 km northwest of Brownsville
Celaya	72	26.023776	97.68801	26.023776°N 97.68801°W	n/a	November 7, 1912	1912		117.6	Lower Rio Grande Valley	Matamoros, Tamaulipas, 1.5 km southwest of San Isidro Ranch and about 22 km northwest of Brownsville
Rosita	73	26.03139	97.68944	26.03139°N 97.68944°W	n/a	November 7, 1912	1912	46.2		Lower Rio Grande Valley	Cameron County, Texas, southwest of San Isidro Ranch and about 22 km northwest of Brownsville
Campamento	74	26.036778	97.665879	26.036778°N 97.665879°W	n/a	November 7, 1912	1912	51.9		Lower Rio Grande Valley	Cameron County, Texas, southeast of Barranco Ranch and about 21 km northwest of Brownsville
Carmen	75	25.949018	97.583989	25.949018°N 97.583989°W	n/a	November 7, 1912	1912		57.6	Lower Rio Grande Valley	Matamoros, Tamaulipas, 1.5 km south of Carmen Ranch and about 9 km northwest of Brownsville
Las Prietas	76	25.920322	97.548642	25.920322°N 97.548642°W	n/a	November 7, 1912	1912		85	Lower Rio Grande Valley	Matamoros, Tamaulipas, 0.5 km east of Las Rucias Ranch and about 4 km northwest of Brownsville
Santa Rosalia	77	25.879553	97.459422	25.879553°N 97.459422°W	n/a	November 7, 1912	1912		54.9	Lower Rio Grande Valley	Matamoros, Tamaulipas, 1 km south of Santa Rosalia Ranch and about 5 km southeast of Brownsville
Los Naranjos	78	25.901356	97.364247	25.901356°N 97.364247°W	n/a	November 7, 1912	1912		256	Lower Rio Grande Valley	Matamoros, Tamaulipas, northwest of Carrera Ranch and about 14 km east of Brownsville
San Martin	79	25.921001	97.345083	25.921001°N 97.345083°W	n/a	November 7, 1912	1912		111	Lower Rio Grande Valley	Matamoros, Tamaulipas, 1 km south of San Martin Ranch and about 16 km east of Brownsville
Caja Pinta (La Lomita)	80	25.93833	97.2975	25.93833°N 97.2975°W	n/a	November 7, 1912	1912	144.1		Lower Rio Grande Valley	Cameron County, Texas, southeast of Tulosa Ranch and about 20 km northeast of Brownsville
Solisenito	81	26.04694	97.78806	26.04694°N 97.78806°W	n/a	November 7, 1912	1912	60.3		Lower Rio Grande Valley	Cameron County, Texas, south of Galveston Ranch and about 32 km west of Brownsville
Grulla	82	26.250748	98.676157	26.250748°N 98.676157°W	n/a	November 7, 1912	1912		119.1	Lower Rio Grande Valley	Camargo, Tamaulipas, 1.5 km west of Belavares Ranch and about 20 km southeast of Rio Grande City, Texas; opposite Banco Valadeces 130
Havana	83	26.207589	98.500731	26.207589°N 98.500731°W	n/a	November 7, 1912	1912		54.4	Lower Rio Grande Valley	Reynosa, Tamaulipas, about 1 km north of Prietas Ranch and about 4 km south of Havana, Texas
Closner	84	26.183333	98.425	26.183333°N 98.425°W	n/a	November 7, 1912	1912		85.5	Lower Rio Grande Valley	Reynosa, Tamaulipas, about 1 km north of Barranco Ranch and about 10 km southeast of Havana, Texas
Coyote	85	26.12361	98.319444	26.12361°N 98.319444°W	n/a	November 7, 1912	1912	30.6		Lower Rio Grande Valley	Hidalgo County, Texas, 1.5 km southwest of Grangeno Ranch and about .6 km west of Hidalgo
Santa Anita	86	25.8339	97.467603	25.8339°N 97.467603°W	n/a	November 7, 1912	1912		49.9	Lower Rio Grande Valley	Matamoros, Tamaulipas, east of Colote Ranch and about 10 km southeast of Brownsville, Texas
San Pedro	87	25.857939	97.361801	25.857939°N 97.361801°W	n/a	November 7, 1912	1912		95.9	Lower Rio Grande Valley	Matamoros, Tamaulipas, 2 km north of Santa Rosa Ranch and about 15 km southeast of Brownsville, Texas
San Miguel	88	25.898409	97.373147	25.898409°N 97.373147°W	n/a	November 7, 1912	1912	56.3		Lower Rio Grande Valley	Cameron County, Texas, east of Sabinitas Ranch and about 12 km east of Brownsville
Monterrey	89	26.072832	98.08574	26.072832°N 98.08574°W	n/a	November 7, 1912	1912	32.1		Lower Rio Grande Valley	Hidalgo County, Texas, 1 km northwest of the Donna Pumping Plant and about 18 km east of Hidalgo
Casas	90	26.36611	98.87306	26.36611°N 98.87306°W	104	April 23, 1928	1928	138.4		Lower Rio Grande Valley	
Las Adjuntas	91	26.36694	98.84611	26.36694°N 98.84611°W	106	May 26, 1928	1928	221.7		Lower Rio Grande Valley	Starr County, Texas, 3 km above Rio Grande City, Texas, South of R.P. 1, and of "Los Garcias Ranch", southwest of Banco No. 58 Izaguirre, and at the mouth of the San Juan River
El Refugio	92	26.3225	98.74139	26.3225°N 98.74139°W	104	April 23, 1928	1928	221.7		Lower Rio Grande Valley	
El Barrito	93	26.31194	98.73278	26.31194°N 98.73278°W	104	April 23, 1928	1928	272		Lower Rio Grande Valley	
La Chicharra	94	26.2675	98.62917	26.2675°N 98.62917°W	104	April 23, 1928	1928	51.4		Lower Rio Grande Valley	
Santos	95	26.25889	98.59472	26.25889°N 98.59472°W	104	April 23, 1928	1928	66.2		Lower Rio Grande Valley	
Cuevitas	96	26.25833	98.58028	26.25833°N 98.58028°W	104	April 23, 1928	1928	93.4		Lower Rio Grande Valley	
Caballero	97	26.21444	98.43417	26.21444°N 98.43417°W	104	April 23, 1928	1928	184.1		Lower Rio Grande Valley	
Reynosa	98	26.12444	98.26556	26.12444°N 98.26556°W	104	April 23, 1928	1928	68.9		Lower Rio Grande Valley	
La Chapena	99	26.08361	98.23306	26.08361°N 98.23306°W	104	April 23, 1928	1928	146.3		Lower Rio Grande Valley	
Kelly	100	26.065342	98.237562	26.065342°N 98.237562°W	104	April 23, 1928	1928		194.2	Lower Rio Grande Valley	
Rancho Nuevo	101	26.07	98.1225	26.07°N 98.1225°W	104	April 23, 1928	1928	21		Lower Rio Grande Valley	
Young	102	26.062175	98.117418	26.062175°N 98.117418°W	104	April 23, 1928	1928		30.4	Lower Rio Grande Valley	
Rancho Viejo	103	26.056253	98.082386	26.056253°N 98.082386°W	104	April 23, 1928	1928		96.9	Lower Rio Grande Valley	
Singleterry	104	26.062218	98.078491	26.062218°N 98.078491°W	104	April 23, 1928	1928		29.4	Lower Rio Grande Valley	
Ratamal	105	26.04944	98.053333	26.04944°N 98.053333°W	104	April 23, 1928	1928	47		Lower Rio Grande Valley	
Pena Flora	106	26.049167	98.046667	26.049167°N 98.046667°W	104	April 23, 1928	1928	60		Lower Rio Grande Valley	
Tenacitas	107	26.054814	98.020513	26.054814°N 98.020513°W	104	April 23, 1928	1928		110.9	Lower Rio Grande Valley	
Puertas Verdes	108	26.067247	98.009486	26.067247°N 98.009486°W	104	April 23, 1928	1928	110.9		Lower Rio Grande Valley	
Agua Negra	109	26.069444	97.994167	26.069444°N 97.994167°W	104	April 23, 1928	1928	64.5		Lower Rio Grande Valley	
San Isidro	110	26.056408	97.989536	26.056408°N 97.989536°W	104	April 23, 1928	1928		54.6	Lower Rio Grande Valley	
Sabinito	111	26.051012	97.967134	26.051012°N 97.967134°W	104	April 23, 1928	1928		28.9	Lower Rio Grande Valley	
Llano Grande	112	26.06278	97.96111	26.06278°N 97.96111°W	104	April 23, 1928	1928	135.5		Lower Rio Grande Valley	
Las Moras	113	26.065781	97.870074	26.065781°N 97.870074°W	104	April 23, 1928	1928	71.9		Lower Rio Grande Valley	
Galvan	114	26.055953	97.811677	26.055953°N 97.811677°W	104	April 23, 1928	1928	15.8		Lower Rio Grande Valley	
La Feria	115	26.054953	97.80984	26.054953°N 97.80984°W	104	April 23, 1928	1928		362	Lower Rio Grande Valley	
Champion	116	26.045813	97.800571	26.045813°N 97.800571°W	104	April 23, 1928	1928		111.7	Lower Rio Grande Valley	
Pacheco	117	26.045	97.758333	26.045°N 97.758333°W	104	April 23, 1928	1928	71.2		Lower Rio Grande Valley	
Vaqueteria	118	26.025	97.65528	26.025°N 97.65528°W	104	April 23, 1928	1928	48.2		Lower Rio Grande Valley	
Guerra	119	25.98944	97.618889	25.98944°N 97.618889°W	104	April 23, 1928	1928	142.8		Lower Rio Grande Valley	
Soledad	120	25.966111	97.603056	25.966111°N 97.603056°W	104	April 23, 1928	1928	75.2		Lower Rio Grande Valley	
Matamoros	121	25.89333	97.51472	25.89333°N 97.51472°W	104	April 23, 1928	1928	96.9		Lower Rio Grande Valley	
Los Tomates	122	25.9	97.47167	25.9°N 97.47167°W	104	April 23, 1928	1928	83.8		Lower Rio Grande Valley	north of Banco 131 Jeronimo
Los Borregos	123	25.874444	97.445833	25.874444°N 97.445833°W	104	April 23, 1928	1928	19.3		Lower Rio Grande Valley	
San Joaquin	124	25.846834	97.362219	25.846834°N 97.362219°W	104	April 23, 1928	1928		45	Lower Rio Grande Valley	
Las Comas	125	25.90972	97.37611	25.90972°N 97.37611°W	104	April 23, 1928	1928	35.3		Lower Rio Grande Valley	
El Rincon	126	25.927778	97.355556	25.927778°N 97.355556°W	104	April 23, 1928	1928	47.9		Lower Rio Grande Valley	
El Palmito	127	25.915497	97.323186	25.915497°N 97.323186°W	104	April 23, 1928	1928		143.1	Lower Rio Grande Valley	
Stell-Lind	128	25.96028	97.18861	25.96028°N 97.18861°W	104	April 23, 1928	1928	91.4		Lower Rio Grande Valley	
Bagdad	129	25.955801	97.170437	25.955801°N 97.170437°W	104	April 23, 1928	1928		200.7	Lower Rio Grande Valley	
Valadeces	130	26.2475	98.664167	26.2475°N 98.664167°W	104	April 23, 1928	1928	296.3		Lower Rio Grande Valley	Starr County, Texas, southwest of La Grulla, Texas, southwest(?) of R.P. 9, and opposite to Banco No. 82, La Grulla
Jeronimo	131	25.89389	97.468056	25.89389°N 97.468056°W	104	April 23, 1928	1928	90.9		Lower Rio Grande Valley	Cameron County, Texas, next to and south of Banco 122, "Los Tomates", northwest of R.P. 45, and about 2 km southwest of Brownsville, Texas
La Pascualilla	132	25.9775	97.60333	25.9775°N 97.60333°W	134	May 20, 1931	1931	76.5		Lower Rio Grande Valley	Cameron County, Texas, 1 km southwest of R.P. 39 and of San Pedro Ranch, and 14 km northwest of Brownsville, Texas
Morales	133	25.91306	97.5275	25.91306°N 97.5275°W	134	May 20, 1931	1931	81.88		Lower Rio Grande Valley	Cameron County, Texas, 2 km south of R.P. 42, 3 km west of Brownsville, Texas, and at the City Water Pump.
El Morillo	134	26.16611	98.3775	26.16611°N 98.3775°W	138	February 25, 1932	1932	118.7		Lower Rio Grande Valley	Hidalgo County, Texas, 2 km south of R.P. 17 and 15 km northwest of Hidalgo, Texas
Hollinsworth	135	26.059966	98.210256	26.059966°N 98.210256°W	141	July 17, 1933	1933		122.1	Lower Rio Grande Valley	Reynosa, Tamaulipas, 3 km south of R.P. 22 and 8 km east of Reynosa, Tamaulipas
Villarreales Segundo	136	26.25389	98.64389	26.25389°N 98.64389°W	142	February 27, 1934	1934	278.1		Lower Rio Grande Valley	Starr County, Texas, 2 km southeast of R.P. 9 and La Grulla, Texas
Lozano	137	25.88972	97.48278	25.88972°N 97.48278°W	166	April 3, 1939	1939	240.2		Lower Rio Grande Valley	Cameron County, Texas, 1 km southeast of R.P. 44 and 2 km southeast of Brownsville, Texas
Progreso	138	26.05383	97.98015	26.05383°N 97.98015°W	169	June 6, 1940	1940		176.4	Lower Rio Grande Valley	Reynosa, Tamaulipas, 1.5 km west of the pumping plant at Progreso, Texas, 1.5 km north of San Isidro Ranch, Tamaulipas, and 3.5 km southwest of R.P. No. 28
Las Flores	139	26.051548	97.944698	26.051548°N 97.944698°W	169	June 6, 1940	1940		33.1	Lower Rio Grande Valley	Reynosa, Tamaulipas, 2 km south of R.P. No. 28, 1.5 km southeast of the pumping plant at Progreso, Texas, and 1 km northeast of Las Flores Ranch, Tamaulipas
Nogales	140	25.865995	97.457858	25.865995°N 97.457858°W	171	May 2, 1941	1941		208.6	Lower Rio Grande Valley	Matamoros, Tamaulipas, 3 km east of the City of Matamoros, Tamaulipas, 1 km south of the El Jardin pumping plant, and 5 km southeast of R.P. No. 44
Las Ruelas	141	26.13528	98.29333	26.13528°N 98.29333°W	171	May 2, 1941	1941	183.8		Lower Rio Grande Valley	Hidalgo County, Texas, about 2 km northwest of the town of Hidalgo, Texas, and 1 km southeast of R.P. No. 19
Las Palomas	142	26.03528	97.71528	26.03528°N 97.71528°W	173	February 27, 1942	1942	63.3		Lower Rio Grande Valley	Cameron County, Texas, about 4 km southeast of the town of Los Indios, Texas, and 1 km south of R.P. No. 35
Rock Bend	143	25.938597	97.559469	25.938597°N 97.559469°W	175	December 15, 1943	1943	84		Lower Rio Grande Valley	Cameron County, Texas, about 7 km northwesterly of the city of Brownsville, Texas, and 2 km southwest of R.P. No. 41
La Parida	144	26.180556	98.391667	26.180556°N 98.391667°W	175	December 15, 1943	1943	175		Lower Rio Grande Valley	Hidalgo County, Texas, about 8 km southwest of the town of Mission, Texas, and 1.5 km west of R.P. No. 17
Los Fresnos	145	26.28194	98.6925	26.28194°N 98.6925°W	175	December 15, 1943	1943	223.9		Lower Rio Grande Valley	Starr County, Texas, about 5 km northwesterly of the town of La Grulla, Texas, and 3.5 km south of R.P. No. 7
Orrbe	146	25.929214	97.297324	25.929214°N 97.297324°W	175	December 15, 1943	1943		100.5	Lower Rio Grande Valley	Matamoros, Tamaulipas, 21 km northeasterly of the City of Matamoros, Tamaulipas, and 1.5 km southeasterly of R.P. No. 52
Weil	147	25.863113	97.360575	25.863113°N 97.360575°W	177	December 21, 1944	1944		26.9	Lower Rio Grande Valley	Matamoros, Tamaulipas, about 15 km southeasterly of the City of Matamoros, Tamaulipas and 2.0 km northeasterly of R.P. No. 48
Las Antonias	148	25.947356	97.189544	25.947356°N 97.189544°W	177	December 21, 1944	1944		96.1	Lower Rio Grande Valley	Matamoros, Tamaulipas, about 5.2 km southwesterly of the mouth of the Rio Grande and 1.7 km southeasterly of R.P. 54
Carrera	149	25.901602	97.375232	25.901602°N 97.375232°W	179	June 29, 1945	1945	24.5		Lower Rio Grande Valley	Cameron County, Texas, about 8 miles (13 km) southeasterly from the city of Brownsville, Texas, and 1.9 km southwesterly of R.P. No. 50
Cisneros	150	25.950428	97.249614	25.950428°N 97.249614°W	179	June 29, 1945	1945	19.8		Lower Rio Grande Valley	Cameron County, Texas, about 7 miles (11 km) upstream from the mouth of the Rio Grande, and 1.0 km southeasterly of R.P. No. 53
Hudson	151	26.248848	98.598294	26.248848°N 98.598294°W	179	June 29, 1945	1945		127	Lower Rio Grande Valley	Camargo, Tamaulipas, about 2 km northwesterly of the settlement of San Miguel, and 1.5 km southeasterly of R.P. No. 10
Ratcliff	152	26.245491	98.615024	26.245491°N 98.615024°W	179	June 29, 1945	1945		47.9	Lower Rio Grande Valley	Camargo, Tamaulipas, about 4 km northwesterly of the settlement of San Miguel, and 1.8 km southwesterly of R.P. No. 10
Culebron	153	26.03694	97.75333	26.03694°N 97.75333°W	183	October 14, 1946	1946	185.8		Lower Rio Grande Valley	Cameron County, Texas, about 1.5 km southwest of the village of Los Indios, Texas, and 1.5 km southerly of R.P. No. 34
Ringgold	154	26.358054	98.81389	26.358054°N 98.81389°W	193	September 26, 1949	1949		281.9	Lower Rio Grande Valley	
Don Juan Cross	155	26.06583	98.19306	26.06583°N 98.19306°W	193	September 26, 1949	1949	190.2		Lower Rio Grande Valley	
Los Indios	156	26.025633	97.73232	26.025633°N 97.73232°W	231	May 18, 1968	1968		154.55	Lower Rio Grande Valley	
Weber	301	31.76307	106.442128	31.76307°N 106.442128°W	122	March 18, 1930	1930	168.5		El Paso-Juarez Valley	El Paso County, 1 km South of R.P. No. 1 and South of Washington Park, in the City of El Paso, Texas
San Lorenzo	302	31.763707	106.417483	31.763707°N 106.417483°W	123	March 21, 1930	1930	434.5		El Paso-Juarez Valley	El Paso County, Texas, about 7 km East of El Paso and 2 km Southwest of R.P. No. 2, in the Collingsworth and Alameda Acres Subdivisions
Bermudez	303	31.748549	106.400228	31.748549°N 106.400228°W	121	March 3, 1930	1930	228.5		El Paso-Juarez Valley	El Paso County, about 9 km southeast of El Paso, Texas, 3 km south of R.P. No. 2, in what is known as Valley Gate Addition
Azcarate	304	31.732061	106.382443	31.732061°N 106.382443°W	121	March 3, 1930	1930		96.1	El Paso-Juarez Valley	Juarez, Chihuahua, 3 km northeast of Senecu and 1/2 km southwest of R.P. No. 3
Compania Agricola	305	31.665196	106.328678	31.665196°N 106.328678°W	121	March 3, 1930	1930	120.6		El Paso-Juarez Valley	El Paso County, about 3 1/2 km south of Ysleta, Texas, 3 km southwest of R.P. No. 7
La Piedra	306	31.369792	105.958574	31.369792°N 105.958574°W	127	May 1, 1930	1930	62.7		El Paso-Juarez Valley	Hudspeth County, Texas, at R.P. 24, about 3 km Southeast of the El Paso-Hudspeth County line
Max Muller	307	31.356321	105.944812	31.356321°N 105.944812°W	127	May 1, 1930	1930	27.2		El Paso-Juarez Valley	Hudspeth County, Texas, about 6 km Southeast of the El Paso-Hudspeth County line and 2 km West of R.P. 25
La Cachanilla	308	31.333457	105.937322	31.333457°N 105.937322°W	125	April 25, 1930	1930	45.5		El Paso-Juarez Valley	Hudspeth County, Texas, 2 1/2 km west of Acala, Texas, and 3 km west of R.P. 26
Rincon de Marcelino	309	31.317804	105.928877	31.317804°N 105.928877°W	125	April 25, 1930	1930	267.7		El Paso-Juarez Valley	Hudspeth County, Texas, 2 1/2 km south of Acala, Texas, and 2 km south of R.P. 26
Arroyo del Alamo	310	31.309049	105.914896	31.309049°N 105.914896°W	121	March 3, 1930	1930		214	El Paso-Juarez Valley	Guadelupe, Chihuahua, at Miramar at the mouth of the Arroyo del Alamo, and 3 km west of R.P. 27
Newman	311	31.261626	105.857341	31.261626°N 105.857341°W	121	March 3, 1930	1930		65.9	El Paso-Juarez Valley	Guadelupe, Chihuahua, 2 km northeast of El Porvenir and 1 1/2 km southwest of T.S. 43
Gallego	312	31.2655	105.843942	31.2655°N 105.843942°W	124	April 9, 1930	1930	54.6		El Paso-Juarez Valley	Hudspeth County, Texas, 3 km southeast of Fort Hancock and at T.S. No. 43
Camp Rice	313	31.251592	105.833889	31.251592°N 105.833889°W	125	April 25, 1930	1930	646.4		El Paso-Juarez Valley	Hudspeth County, Texas, 6 km Southeast of Fort Hancock, Texas, and West of R.P. 30
Nunez	314	31.206722	105.784363	31.206722°N 105.784363°W	124	April 9, 1930	1930	174.2		El Paso-Juarez Valley	Hudspeth County, Texas, 5 km south of McNary and 1 km northwest of R.P. No. 32
Charles Davis	315	31.160891	105.73084	31.160891°N 105.73084°W	121	March 3, 1930	1930	393.5		El Paso-Juarez Valley	Hudspeth County, Texas, 4 km southeast of 90 Ranch and 1 1/2 km west of R.P. 34
Calero	316	31.117905	105.641778	31.117905°N 105.641778°W	121	March 3, 1930	1930	41.7		El Paso-Juarez Valley	Hudspeth County, Texas, 1 1/2 km southeast of Dave Gill's Gin, and at R.P. 37
Pruitt	317	31.094764	105.638063	31.094764°N 105.638063°W	121	March 3, 1930	1930		41.5	El Paso-Juarez Valley	Guadelupe, Chihuahua, 2 km southwest of R.P. 38, "Fort Quitman"
Diablo	318	31.233697	105.816046	31.233697°N 105.816046°W	121	March 3, 1930	1930	95.9		El Paso-Juarez Valley	Hudspeth County, Texas, at the mouth of the Diablo Arroyo, south of R.P. No. 30 and southwest of McNary, Texas (adjacent to Banco 320)
Guayuco	319	31.124459	105.658551	31.124459°N 105.658551°W	121	March 3, 1930	1930	337.6		El Paso-Juarez Valley	Hudspeth County, Texas, at the mouth of the Guayuco Arroyo, south of R.P. No. 36 and southwest of "Dave Gill" gin
Diablo Segundo	320	31.2341	105.817576	31.2341°N 105.817576°W	139	May 12, 1932	1932	41.02		El Paso-Juarez Valley	Hudspeth County, Texas, at the mouth of the El Diablo Arroyo and adjacent to Banco No. 318, between R.P. Nos. 30 and 31, to the southwest of McNary, Texas, and southeast of El Porvenir, Chihuahua
Cerros Colorados	321	29.113805	103.036896	30.874987°N 105.390565°W	176	June 5, 1944	1944	12.8		Quitman Canyon	Hudspeth County, Texas, about 9.0 km northwest of the village of Hot Springs, Texas
Farias	322	29.120519	103.022008	30.861185°N 105.393575°W	176	June 5, 1944	1944	13		Quitman Canyon	Hudspeth County, Texas, about 8 km northwest of the village of Hot Springs, Texas
El Bano	323	29.118331	103.009729	30.852383°N 105.397903°W	176	June 5, 1944	1944	20.2		Quitman Canyon	Hudspeth County, Texas, about 8 km northwest of the village of Hot Springs, Texas
Grande	324	31.674575	106.396646	30.75609°N 105.144277°W	176	June 5, 1944	1944	28.6		Quitman Canyon	Hudspeth County, Texas, about 7 km northwest of the village of Bosque Bonito, Chihuahua
Bosque Bonito	325	31.651593	106.342659	30.746606°N 105.127444°W	176	June 5, 1944	1944		43.2	Quitman Canyon	Guadelupe, Chihuahua, about 5 km northwest of the village of Bosque Bonito, Chihuahua
Fierro	326	31.630833	106.27	30.708829°N 105.07793°W	176	June 5, 1944	1944	46.2		Quitman Canyon	Hudspeth County, Texas, about 2 km northeast of the village of Bosque Bonito, Chihuahua
Adalberto	327	31.623194	106.243611	30.705506°N 105.070555°W	176	June 5, 1944	1944	25.4		Quitman Canyon	Hudspeth County, Texas, about 3 km southeast of the village of Bosque Bonito, Chihuahua
Martinez	328	31.595019	106.220863	30.688637°N 105.05879°W	176	June 5, 1944	1944	6.7		Quitman Canyon	Hudspeth County, Texas, about 4 km southeast of the village of Bosque Bonito, Chihuahua
Bonifacio	329	31.598363	106.213903	30.68798°N 105.054151°W	176	June 5, 1944	1944	41		Quitman Canyon	Hudspeth County, Texas, about 5 km southeast of the village of Bosque Bonito, Chihuahua
Pilares	330	30.422367	104.854766	30.422367°N 104.854766°W	176	June 5, 1944	1944	49.9		Quitman Canyon	Presidio County, Texas, opposite and to the east of the Mexican settlement of Pilares, Chihuahua
Pilarito	331	30.411897	104.850896	30.411897°N 104.850896°W	176	June 5, 1944	1944	5.5		Quitman Canyon	Presidio County, Texas, about 2 km southeast of the Mexican settlement of Pilares, Chihuahua
Cajoncitos	332	30.961192	105.494747	30.961192°N 105.494747°W	176	June 5, 1944	1944	4.4		Quitman Canyon	Hudspeth County, Texas, about 4 km downstream from the lower end of the Rio Grande Rectification Project
El Comedor	333	30.260636	104.748986	30.260636°N 104.748986°W	178	March 16, 1945	1945		12.1	Quitman Canyon	Ojinaga, Chihuahua about 19 km upstream from the village of San Antonio, Chihuahua
Carranza	334	30.51364	104.87292	30.51364°N 104.87292°W	250	January 21, 1976	1976	3.7		Quitman Canyon	situated in the Ejido Emilio Carranza, Chih. and 2.5 km north of Snyder Ranch, Texas (between Fort Quitman and the mouth of the Rio Conchos)
Macum	335	30.306051	104.764903	30.306051°N 104.764903°W	250	January 21, 1976	1976	3.4		Quitman Canyon	situated 1.4 km east of the town of Buena Vista, Chih. And opposite the mouth of Macum Arroyo, 20 km northwest of Candelaria, Texas (between Fort Quitman and the mouth of the Rio Conchos)
La Rana	401	30.125785	104.693834	30.125785°N 104.693834°W	119	February 4, 1930	1930	108.2		Presidio Valley	Presidio County, Texas, 1 1/2 km southwest of Candelaria and R.P. No. 5 in the Candelaria Valley
El Pilon	402	30.107616	104.683928	30.107616°N 104.683928°W	119	February 4, 1930	1930	41.7		Presidio Valley	Presidio County, Texas, 3 1/2 km south of Candelaria and 1 km southwest of R.P. No. 6, Candelaria Valley
Galindo	403	29.626057	104.489103	29.626057°N 104.489103°W	119	February 4, 1930	1930		168.5	Presidio Valley	Ojinaga, Chih. 2 km west of R.P. No. 24 and 3 km west of Haciendita in the Presidio Valley
Haciendita	404	29.615314	104.474793	29.615314°N 104.474793°W	119	February 4, 1930	1930		313.3	Presidio Valley	Ojinaga, Chih. 2 1/2 km west of R.P. No. 25 and 2 km west of Haciendita in Presidio Valley
Ojinaga	405	29.600267	104.46708	29.600267°N 104.46708°W	119	February 4, 1930	1930	69.2		Presidio Valley	Presidio County, Texas, 1 km southwest of R.P. No. 25 and 1 km south of Haciendita in the Presidio Valley
Aguilar	407	29.546562	104.365257	29.546562°N 104.365257°W	120	February 19, 1930	1930	367		Presidio Valley	Presidio County, Texas, at R.P. No. 29, 3 1/2 km below Presidio
Tabalopa	408	29.532585	104.349446	29.532585°N 104.349446°W	120	February 19, 1930	1930	312.1		Presidio Valley	Presidio County, Texas, 2 km below R.P. No. 29 and 5 1/2 km below Presidio
Quibira	409	29.53325	104.339314	29.53325°N 104.339314°W	120	February 19, 1930	1930	104.3		Presidio Valley	Presidio County, Texas, at R.P. No. 30, El Fortin, 6 1/2 km below Presidio
Los Puliques	410	29.533822	104.315467	29.533822°N 104.315467°W	120	February 19, 1930	1930	249.6		Presidio Valley	Presidio County, Texas, at R.P. No. 31, Casa Blanca, 8 km below Presidio
San Rafael	411	29.416992	104.184642	29.416992°N 104.184642°W	119	February 4, 1930	1930		85	Presidio Valley	Ojinaga, Chih. 1 km above R.P. No. 38 and 3 km below El Polvo, Texas, in the Mulato Valley
El Mulato	412	29.399875	104.167152	29.399875°N 104.167152°W	119	February 4, 1930	1930	49.2		Presidio Valley	Presidio County, Texas, at R.P. No. 39, 6 km below El Polvo, Texas, in the Mulato Valley
Ochoa	413	29.650178	104.533815	29.650334°N 104.523462°W	136	May 22, 1931	1931		321.3	Presidio Valley	Ojinaga, Chih. 14 1/2 km northwest of Ojinaga and 2 1/2 km southwest of R.P. No. 22, Ochoa Ranch, Texas; northwest of and adjacent to Banco No. 414, "El Jazmin"
El Jazmin	414	29.649821	104.533965	29.648437°N 104.517177°W	136	May 22, 1931	1931		7.4	Presidio Valley	Ojinaga, Chih. 14 1/2 km northwest of Ojinaga and 2 1/2 km southwest of R.P. No. 22, Ochoa Ranch, Texas, and southeast and adjacent to Banco No. 413, "Ochoa"
San Antonio	415	30.156332	104.685326	30.156332°N 104.685326°W	170	February 18, 1941	1941	21.7		Presidio Valley	Presidio County, Texas, 2.2 km north of R.P. 5 which is situated in the town of Candelaria, Texas
Angostura	416	29.646366	104.510685	29.646366°N 104.510685°W	170	February 18, 1941	1941	19		Presidio Valley	Presidio County, Texas, 1.3 km southwest of R.P. 22 and 17 km upstream from Presidio
Casner	417	29.84125	104.630809	29.84125°N 104.630809°W	170	February 18, 1941	1941		26.9	Presidio Valley	Ojinaga, Chihuahua, 37 km northwest of Ojinaga and 1.0 km west of R.P. 16
Ruidosa	418	29.982666	104.70065	29.982666°N 104.70065°W	170	February 18, 1941	1941		11.4	Presidio Valley	Ojinaga, Chihuahua, 54 km northwest of Ojinaga, 1.5 km downstream from Barrancos de Guadelupe (Banco 434), Chihuahua, and 1.5 km southwest of R.P. 11
Kilpatrick	419	30.1475	104.692778	30.1475°N 104.692778°W	178	March 16, 1945	1945		109.7	Presidio Valley	Near the town of San Antonio, Chihuahua, in the municipality of Ojinaga, Chihuahua, about 1.5 km northwesterly of R.P. No. 5
Candelaria	420	30.14236	104.684373	30.14236°N 104.684373°W	178	March 16, 1945	1945	23.5		Presidio Valley	Presidio County, Texas, near the village of Candelaria and about 0.6 km northeasterly of R.P. No. 5
Candela	421	30.135752	104.691052	30.135752°N 104.691052°W	178	March 16, 1945	1945	34.6		Presidio Valley	Presidio County, Texas, near the village of Candelaria and about 0.9 km southwesterly of R.P. No. 5
Palo Blanco	422	30.130529	104.697072	30.130529°N 104.697072°W	178	March 16, 1945	1945		26.2	Presidio Valley	Near the village of San Antonio, in the municipality of Ojinaga, Chihuahua, about 1.5 km southwesterly of R.P. No. 5
Guadelupe	423	29.988721	104.696021	29.988721°N 104.696021°W	178	March 16, 1945	1945		6.4	Presidio Valley	Ojinaga, Chihuahua, opposite the town of Ruidosa, Texas, and about 1.1 km southwesterly of R.P. No. 11
Tascate	424	29.982583	104.686897	29.982583°N 104.686897°W	178	March 16, 1945	1945	36.6		Presidio Valley	Presidio County, Texas, near the town of Ruidosa, Texas, and about 1.7 km southerly of R.P. No. 11
Chinati	425	29.810596	104.592887	29.810596°N 104.592887°W	178	March 16, 1945	1945	1.5		Presidio Valley	Presidio County, Texas, about 0.5 km westerly of R.P. No. 17-A
Mimbres	426	29.654734	104.515389	29.654734°N 104.515389°W	178	March 16, 1945	1945	63		Presidio Valley	Presidio County, Texas, near the village of Ochoa, and about 1.8 km westerly of R.P. No. 22-A
La Quemada	427	29.648005	104.514722	29.648005°N 104.514722°W	178	March 16, 1945	1945	11.9		Presidio Valley	Presidio County, Texas, near the village of Ochoa, and about 2.2 km southwesterly of R.P. No. 22-A
Buenavista	428	29.638502	104.494761	29.638502°N 104.494761°W	178	March 16, 1945	1945	25.5		Presidio Valley	Presidio County, Texas, about 1.1 km southwesterly of R.P. No. 23
Gleim	429	29.638362	104.497344	29.638362°N 104.497344°W	178	March 16, 1945	1945		4.2	Presidio Valley	Ojinaga, Chihuahua, opposite the Molinares Ranch in the United States, and about 1.4 km southwesterly of R.P. No. 23
El Muerto	430	30.097025	104.694594	30.097025°N 104.694594°W	237	July 27, 1970	1970		91.85	Presidio Valley	
de Holland	431	30.009689	104.696127	30.009689°N 104.696127°W	237	July 27, 1970	1970		131.61	Presidio Valley	
Los Galleros	432	30.002101	104.695291	30.002101°N 104.695291°W	237	July 27, 1970	1970		19.18	Presidio Valley	
La Ruidosa	433	29.988594	104.689515	29.988594°N 104.689515°W	237	July 27, 1970	1970		36.57	Presidio Valley	
Barrancos de Guadelupe	434	29.978923	104.684897	29.978923°N 104.684897°W	237	July 27, 1970	1970	237.12		Presidio Valley	1.5 km upstream of Banco 418
Davis	435	29.96359	104.680746	29.96359°N 104.680746°W	237	July 27, 1970	1970	41.34		Presidio Valley	
La Salineta	436	29.940952	104.676067	29.940952°N 104.676067°W	237	July 27, 1970	1970	75.14		Presidio Valley	
Loma del Pinto	437	29.907951	104.67032	29.907951°N 104.67032°W	237	July 27, 1970	1970		185.08	Presidio Valley	
de Rodriguez	438	29.894328	104.663055	29.894328°N 104.663055°W	237	July 27, 1970	1970		180.04	Presidio Valley	
de Julian	439	29.888788	104.656082	29.888788°N 104.656082°W	237	July 27, 1970	1970		83.37	Presidio Valley	
Loma Alta	440	29.82571	104.6115	29.82571°N 104.6115°W	237	July 27, 1970	1970		38.94	Presidio Valley	
El Redondo	441	29.815612	104.606198	29.815612°N 104.606198°W	237	July 27, 1970	1970		30.44	Presidio Valley	
Las Auras	442	29.796166	104.592416	29.796166°N 104.592416°W	237	July 27, 1970	1970		236.41	Presidio Valley	
Los Pelillos	443	29.789698	104.586518	29.789698°N 104.586518°W	237	July 27, 1970	1970		242.44	Presidio Valley	
Ramirez	444	29.760963	104.562035	29.760963°N 104.562035°W	237	July 27, 1970	1970	96.25		Presidio Valley	
Molinares	445	29.664058	104.529715	29.664058°N 104.529715°W	237	July 27, 1970	1970		137.27	Presidio Valley	
La Quemada	446	29.645893	104.518161	29.645893°N 104.518161°W	237	July 27, 1970	1970		75.34	Presidio Valley	
de Terrazas	447	29.625182	104.495152	29.625182°N 104.495152°W	237	July 27, 1970	1970		93.65	Presidio Valley	
El Atascadero	448	29.619261	104.485307	29.619261°N 104.485307°W	237	July 27, 1970	1970		121.77	Presidio Valley	
Panales	449	30.08141	104.692041	30.08141°N 104.692041°W	239	October 29, 1970	1970		85.69	Presidio Valley	approximately 6 km south of Candelaria, Texas and San Antonio del Bravo, Chihuahua
Loma del Pinto Segundo	450	29.902427	104.669556	29.902427°N 104.669556°W	239	October 29, 1970	1970		92.12	Presidio Valley	opposite Ejido Las Conchas, Chihuahua, approximately 3 km northwest of Vado de Piedra Diversion Dam
La Oficina	451	30.113027	104.691528	30.113027°N 104.691528°W	250	January 21, 1976	1976	1.1		Presidio Valley	situated between the towns of San Antonio del Bravo and La Oficina, Chih. and 3 km south of Candelaria, Texas
Vado de Piedra	452	29.864472	104.630395	29.864472°N 104.630395°W	250	January 21, 1976	1976	2.3		Presidio Valley	situated 2.5 km north of the town of Vado de Piedra, Chih. near the Vado de Piedra Diversion Dam and opposite the mouth of the Gold Hill Arroyo
Las Viboras	453	29.839921	104.608835	29.839921°N 104.608835°W	250	January 21, 1976	1976	12.3		Presidio Valley	situated 1.6 km east of the town of Las Viboras, Chih. and 1.8 km north of Chinati Ranch, Texas
Rancho Texas	454	29.828808	104.61079	29.828808°N 104.61079°W	250	January 21, 1976	1976	26.4		Presidio Valley	situated 1.5 km north of Rancho Chanate, Chih. and 0.8 km northwest of the Chinati Ranch, Texas
Farmers	501	32.620833	114.775	32.620833°N 114.775°W	99	October 26, 1927	1927	583.4		Colorado River	
Fain	502	32.5516	114.764517	32.5516°N 114.764517°W	99	October 26, 1927	1927	259		Colorado River	
El Carino	601	28.867194	100.573671	28.867194°N 100.573671°W	126	April 28, 1930	1930	285.2		Hill Section	Maverick County, Texas, 20 km Northwest of Eagle Pass, Texas, and Southwest of Little's Ranch
San Felipe	602	29.323868	100.907437	29.323868°N 100.907437°W	204	January 14, 1956	1956	508.26		Hill Section	

Note: For all 247 bancos, aerial images, including orthographic images, provide visible evidence of each location at the stated coordinates. The latitude and longitude coordinates are within the perimeter of each banco and were exactly located, as shown on the maps that were published with the corresponding minutes of the International Boundary and Water Commission, which officially transferred jurisdiction over each banco.

== See also ==
- International Boundary and Water Commission
- Mexico–United States border
- List of United States treaties
- Treaty of Guadalupe Hidalgo
- Resaca (channel)
